= Raghabpur =

- Census Town
- Location in West Bengal, India Raghabpur (India)
- Coordinates: 23.3586°N 86.3612°E
- Country: India
- State: West Bengal
- District: Purulia

Area
  - Total: 6.1715 km^{2} (2.3828 sq mi)

Population (2011)
  - Total: 5,748
  - Density: 931.4/km^{2} (2,412/sq mi)

Languages
  - Official: Bengali, English
- Time zone: UTC+5:30 (IST)
- PIN: 723101
- Telephone/STD code: 03254
- Lok Sabha constituency: Purulia
- Vidhan Sabha constituency: Purulia
- Website: purulia.gov.in

Raghabpur is a census town and a gram panchayat in the Purulia II CD block in the Purulia Sadar subdivision of the Purulia district in the state of West Bengal, India.

== Geography ==
Places in Purulia Sadar subdivision in Purulia district
M: municipality, CT: census town, R: rural/ urban centre, H: historical/ religious centre, F: facility
Owing to space constraints in the small map, the actual locations in a larger map may vary slightly

=== Location Ramchondropur ===
Ramchondropur is located at 23.3586°N 86.3612°E.

=== Area overview ===
Purulia district forms the lowest step of the Chota Nagpur Plateau. The general scenario is undulating land with scattered hills. Purulia Sadar subdivision covers the central portion of the district. 83.80% of the population of the subdivision lives in rural areas. The map alongside shows some urbanization around Purulia city. 18.58% of the population, the highest among the subdivisions of the district, lives in urban areas. There are 4 census towns in the subdivision. The Kangsabati (locally called Kansai) flows through the subdivision. The subdivision has old temples, some of them belonging to the 11th century or earlier. The focus is on education - the university, the sainik school, the Ramakrishna Mission Vidyapith at Bongabari, the upcoming medical college at Hatuara, et al.

Note: The map alongside presents some of the notable locations in the subdivision. All places marked in the map are linked in the larger full screen map.

== Demographics ==
According to the 2011 Census of India, Raghabpur had a total population of 5,748, of which 3,003 (52%) were males and 2,745 (48%) were females. There were 726 persons in the age range of 0–6 years. The total number of literate persons in Raghabpur was 3,224 (64.20% of the population over 6 years).

== Infrastructure ==
According to the District Census Handbook 2011, Puruliya. Raghabpur covered an area of 6.1715 km^{2}. There is a railway station at Purulia nearby. Among the civic amenities, it has 3 km roads, the protected water supply involved tube well/ bore-well. It had 900 domestic electric connections and 50 road lighting points. Among the medical facilities it had 1 hospital with 10 beds, 1 dispensary/ health centre, 1 maternity and child welfare centre and 5 medicine shops. Among the educational facilities it had were 2 primary schools, 1 middle school, the nearest secondary school, senior secondary school, 1 general degree college at Purulia 0.5 km away. It had a polytechnic at Bongabari 3 km away. It had 3 non-formal education centres (Sarbya Siksha Abhiyan centres). It had the branch of 1 nationalised bank.

== Culture ==
In raghapur the adi brahmin community(Adhikary community) worships lord Ram(Raghubar jeu) . the oldest person in the village Sri Ganesh Chandra Adhikary(died in 2024) is the last record of oldest person available.

== other results ==
There is a small rekha deul built of stone in Chharra, located nearby. The tower is extensively carved. The ornamentation of the sikhara suggests that it belongs to an age earlier than the Telkupi temples, i.e., earlier than 11th century. There was another temple which has fallen. It was a plain pancha ratna temple. http://www.censusindia.gov.in/2011census/DCHB/DCHB_A/19/1914_PART_A_DCHB_PURULIYA.pdf | title = District Census Handbook, Puruliya, Series 20, Part XII A| work= Charra - Page 103: Brief Description of Places of Religious, Historical or Archaeological Importance and Places of Tourist Importance of the District |publisher = Directorate of Census Operations, West Bengal |accessdate = 21 January 2020}}</ref>

== Mukhya Mantra ==
jai jai go ram jai jai jai go krishna jai
