= Hutmura =

- Census Town
- Location in West Bengal, India Hutmura (India)
- Coordinates: 23.3546°N 86.4856°E
- Country: India
- State: West Bengal
- District: Purulia

Area
  - Total: 2.4888 km^{2} (0.9609 sq mi)

Population (2011)
  - Total: 5,878
  - Density: 2,362/km^{2} (6,117/sq mi)

Languages
  - Official: Bengali, English
- Time zone: UTC+5:30 (IST)
- PIN: 723148
- Telephone/STD code: 03254
- Lok Sabha constituency: Purulia
- Vidhan Sabha constituency: Purulia
- Website: purulia.gov.in

Hutmura is a census town and a gram panchayat in the Purulia II CD block in the Purulia Sadar subdivision of the Purulia district in the state of West Bengal, India.

== Geography ==
Places in Purulia Sadar subdivision in Purulia district
M: municipality, CT: census town, R: rural/ urban centre, H: historical/ religious centre, F: facility
Owing to space constraints in the small map, the actual locations in a larger map may vary slightly

=== Location ===
Hutmura is located at 23.3546°N 86.4856°E.

=== Area overview ===
Purulia district forms the lowest step of the Chota Nagpur Plateau. The general scenario is undulating land with scattered hills. Purulia Sadar subdivision covers the central portion of the district. 83.80% of the population of the subdivision lives in rural areas. The map alongside shows some urbanization around Purulia city. 18.58% of the population, the highest among the subdivisions of the district, lives in urban areas. There are 4 census towns in the subdivision. The Kangsabati (locally called Kansai) flows through the subdivision. The subdivision has old temples, some of them belonging to the 11th century or earlier. The focus is on education - the university, the sainik school, the Ramakrishna Mission Vidyapith at Bongabari, the upcoming medical college at Hatuara, et al.

Note: The map alongside presents some of the notable locations in the subdivision. All places marked in the map are linked in the larger full screen map.

== Demographics ==
According to the 2011 Census of India, Hutmura had a total population of 5,878, of which 2,967 (50%) were males and 2,911 (50%) were females. There were 993 persons in the age range of 0–6 years. The total number of literate persons in Hutmura was 2,844 (58.22% of the population over 6 years).

== Infrastructure ==
According to the District Census Handbook 2011, Puruliya, Hutmura covered an area of 2.4888 km^{2}. There is a railway station at Purulia. Among the civic amenities, the protected water supply involved tap water from treated source. It had 440 domestic electric connections. Among the medical facilities it had 2 medicine shops. Among the educational facilities it had were 15 primary schools, 2 middle schools, 2 secondary schools, 2 senior secondary schools, the nearest general degree college at Purulia 14 km away. It had 1 non-formal education centre (Sarbya Siksha Abhiyan centre). The nearest special school for the disabled was at Bongabari, 14 km away. Among the social, recreational and cultural facilities, it had 1 public library and 1 reading room. It had the branch of 1 nationalised bank and 1 agricultural credit society.

== Education ==
Hutmura High School is a Bengali-medium boys only institution established in 1911. It has facilities for teaching from class V to class XII.

Hutmura Harimari Girls High School is a Bengali-medium girls only institution. It has facilities for teaching from class V to class XII.

== Culture ==
The Digambar Jain temple at Anaijambad, located nearby, was established in 1973. It houses six statues of four tirthankaras. "The statues are housed within the simple looking temple and are fixed upon an elevated platform". These were collected from different villages. The Kharkhari Sarak community of neighbouring Dhanbad took the initiative to build the temple.

== Healthcare ==
There is a primary health centre, with 10 beds, at Hutmura.
