= Chharra, Purulia =

Chharra
- Village
- Location in West Bengal, India Chharra (India)
- Coordinates: 23.3820°N 86.4170°E
- Country: India
- State: West Bengal
- District: Purulia

Population (2011)
  - Total: 6,131

Languages
  - Official: Bengali, English
- Time zone: UTC+5:30 (IST)
- PIN: 723163
- Telephone/STD code: 03254
- Lok Sabha constituency: Purulia
- Vidhan Sabha constituency: Purulia
- Website: purulia.gov.in

Chharra is a village in the Purulia II CD block in the Purulia Sadar subdivision of the Purulia district in the state of West Bengal, India.

== Geography ==
Places in Purulia Sadar subdivision in Purulia district
M: municipality, CT: census town, R: rural/ urban centre, H: historical/ religious centre, F: facility
Owing to space constraints in the small map, the actual locations in a larger map may vary slightly

=== Location ===
Chharra is located at 23.3820°N 86.4170°E.

Charra Airfield was used during the World War II and abandoned thereafter.

=== Area overview ===
Purulia district forms the lowest step of the Chota Nagpur Plateau. The general scenario is undulating land with scattered hills. Purulia Sadar subdivision covers the central portion of the district. 83.80% of the population of the subdivision lives in rural areas. The map alongside shows some urbanization around Purulia city. 18.58% of the population, the highest among the subdivisions of the district, lives in urban areas. There are 4 census towns in the subdivision. The Kangsabati (locally called Kansai) flows through the subdivision. The subdivision has old temples, some of them belonging to the 11th century or earlier. The focus is on education - the university, the sainik school, the Ramakrishna Mission Vidyapith at Bongabari, the upcoming medical college at Hatuara, et al.

Note: The map alongside presents some of the notable locations in the subdivision. All places marked in the map are linked in the larger full screen map.

== Demographics ==
According to the 2011 Census of India, Chharra had a total population of 6,131, of which 3,163 (52%) were males and 2,968 (48%) were females. There were 818 persons in the age range of 0–6 years. The total number of literate persons in Chharra was 3,312 (62.34% of the population over 6 years).

== Transport ==
There is a station at Chharra on the Adra-Purulia sector of the Asansol-Tatanagar-Kharagpur line of the South Eastern Railway.

== Education ==
Chhara High School is a Bengali-medium coeducational institution established in 1959. It has facilities for teaching from class V to class XII.

== Culture ==
There is a small rekha deul built of stone in the village. The tower is extensively carved. The ornamentation of the sikhara suggests that it belongs to an age earlier than the Telkupi temples, i.e., earlier than 11th century. There was another temple which has fallen. It was a plain pancha ratna temple. With loose Jain sculptures strewn around the village, it is possible that both were Jain temples.

David J. McCutchion says that in the remote areas of old Manbhum district the Jains went on building temples till the 13th century, and many of them are still standing at Bahulara, Harmasra, Deulbhirya, Ambikanagar, Chharra, Pakbirra, Suisa or Deoli, in Bankura and Purulia districts.

== Chharra picture gallery ==
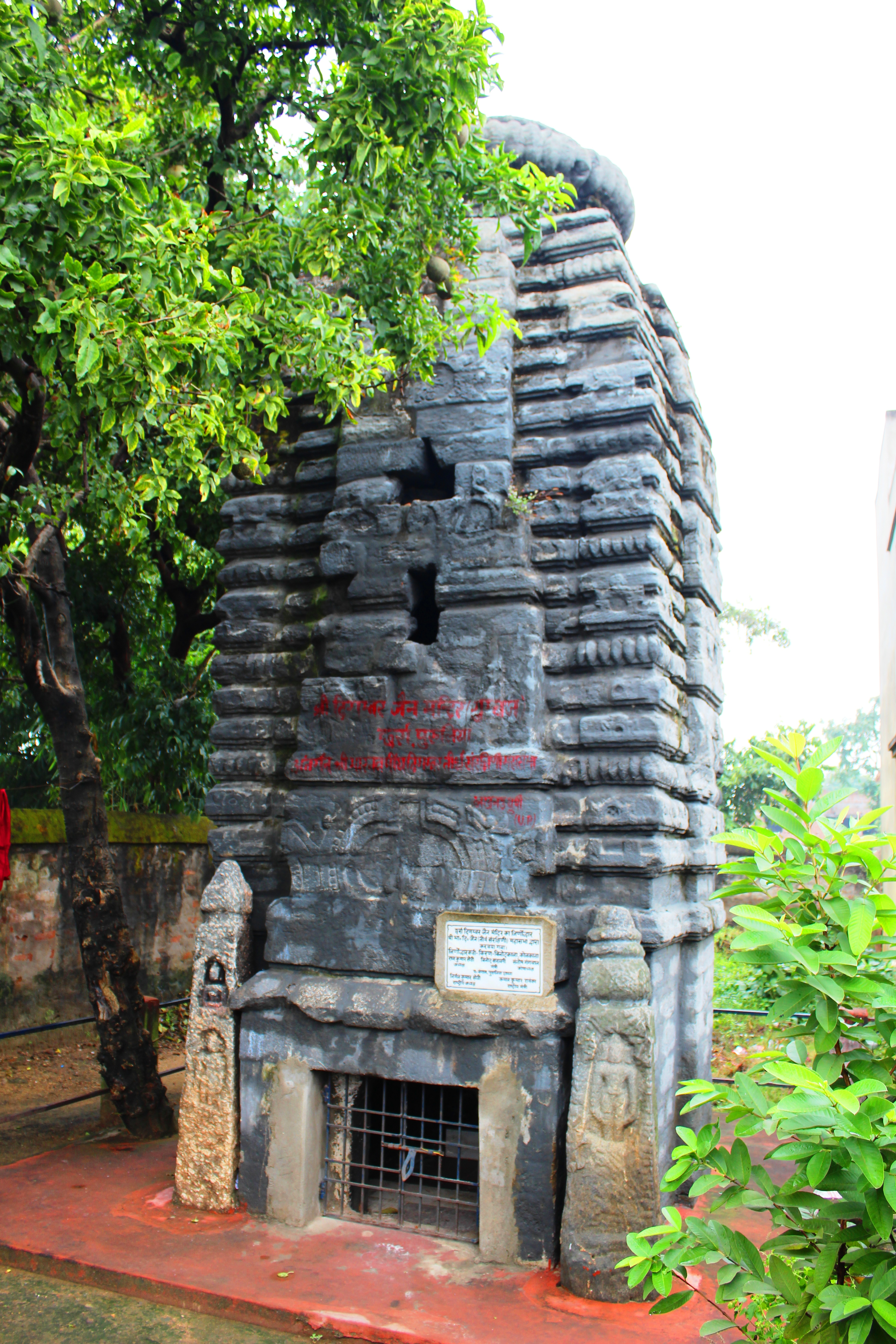
The renovated deul

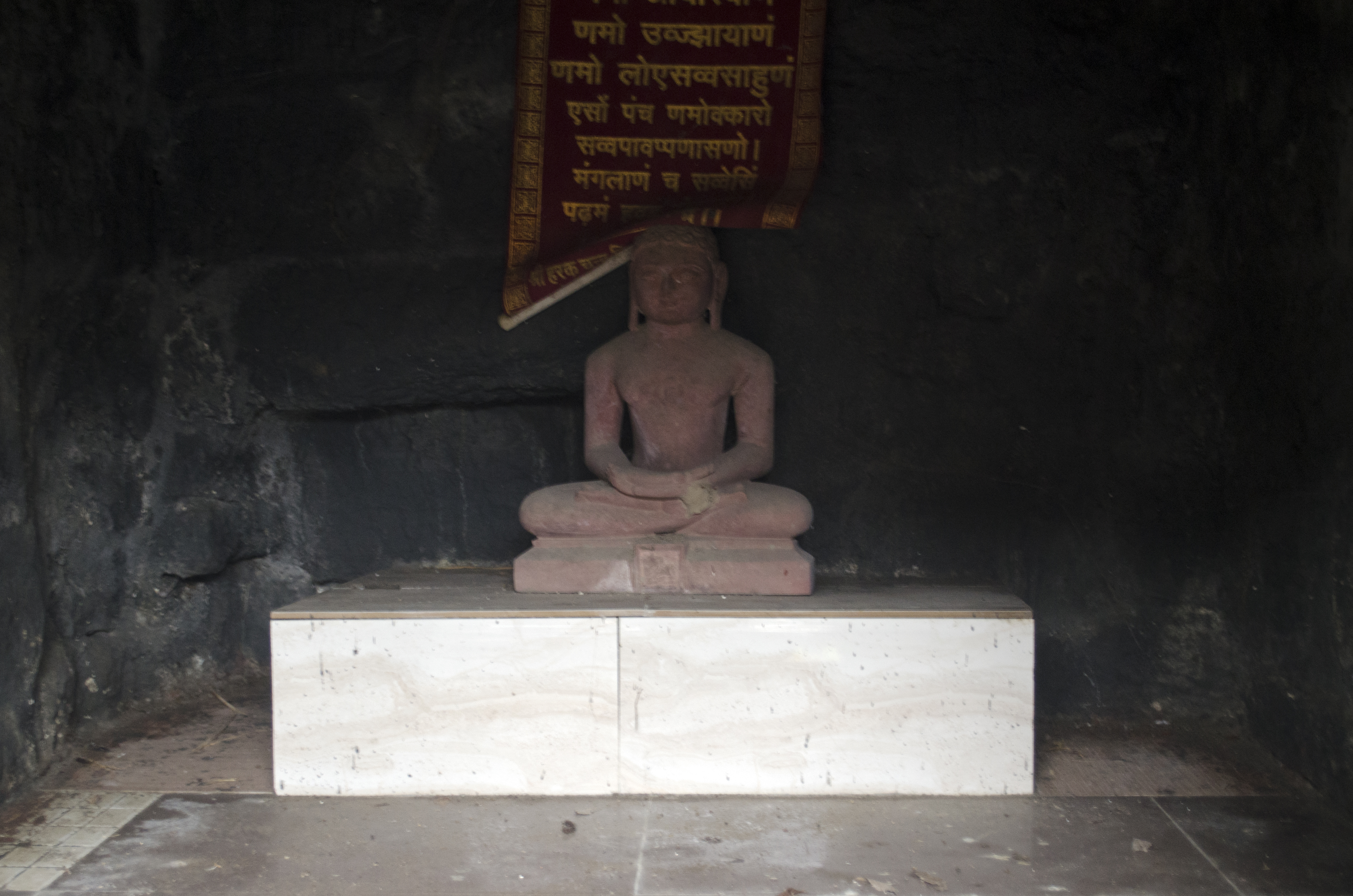
Tirthankar statue

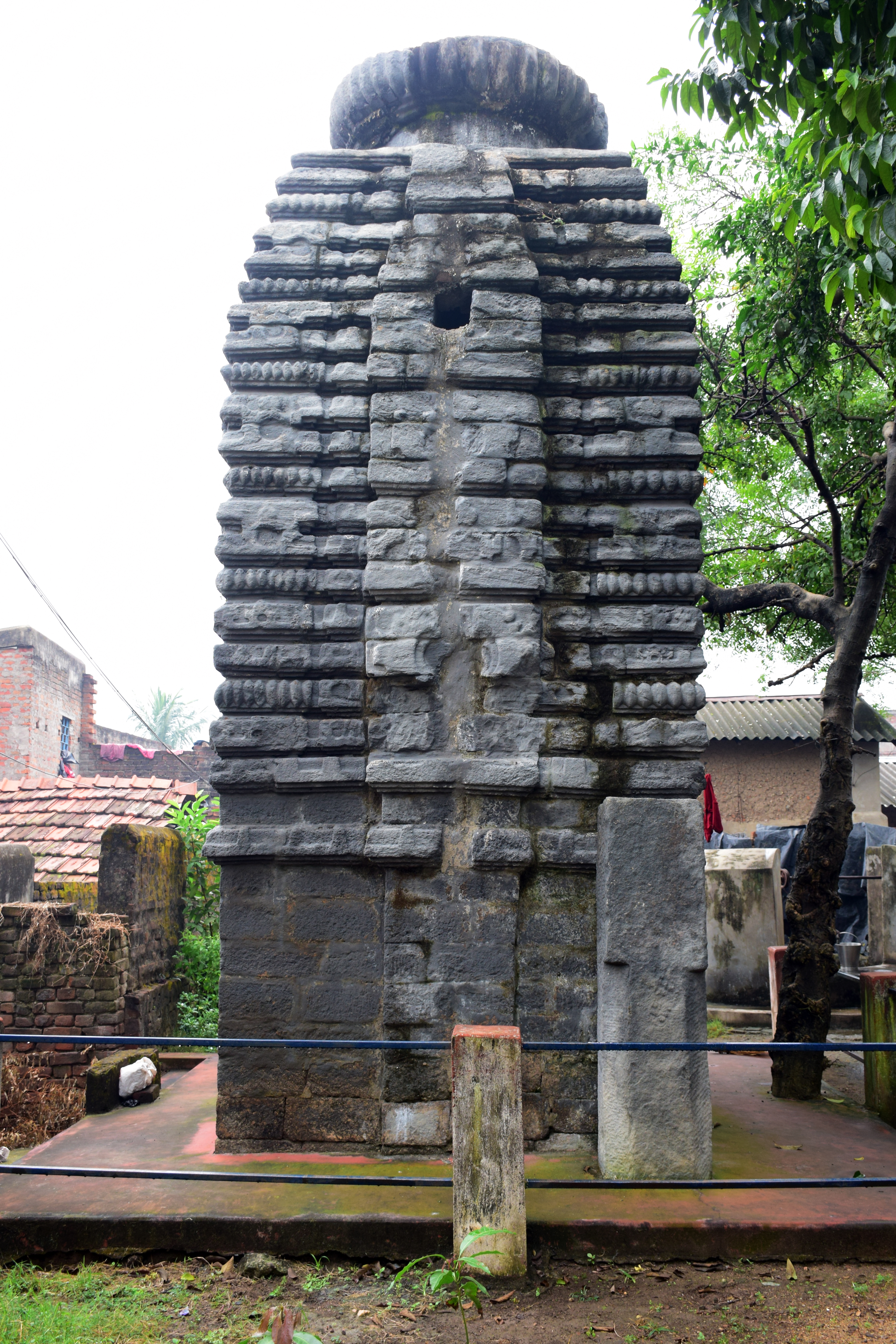
Back side of stone deul

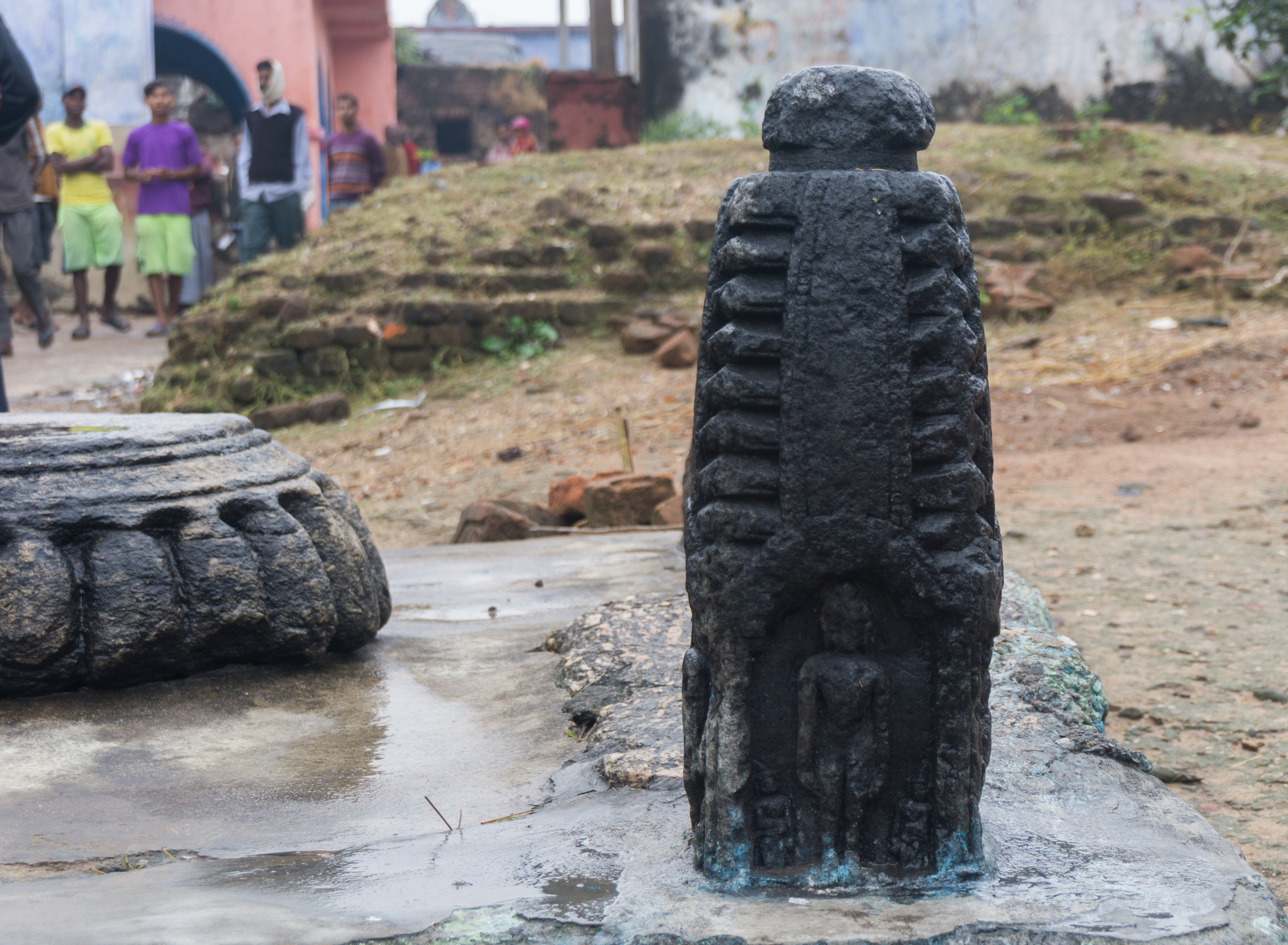
Votive temple

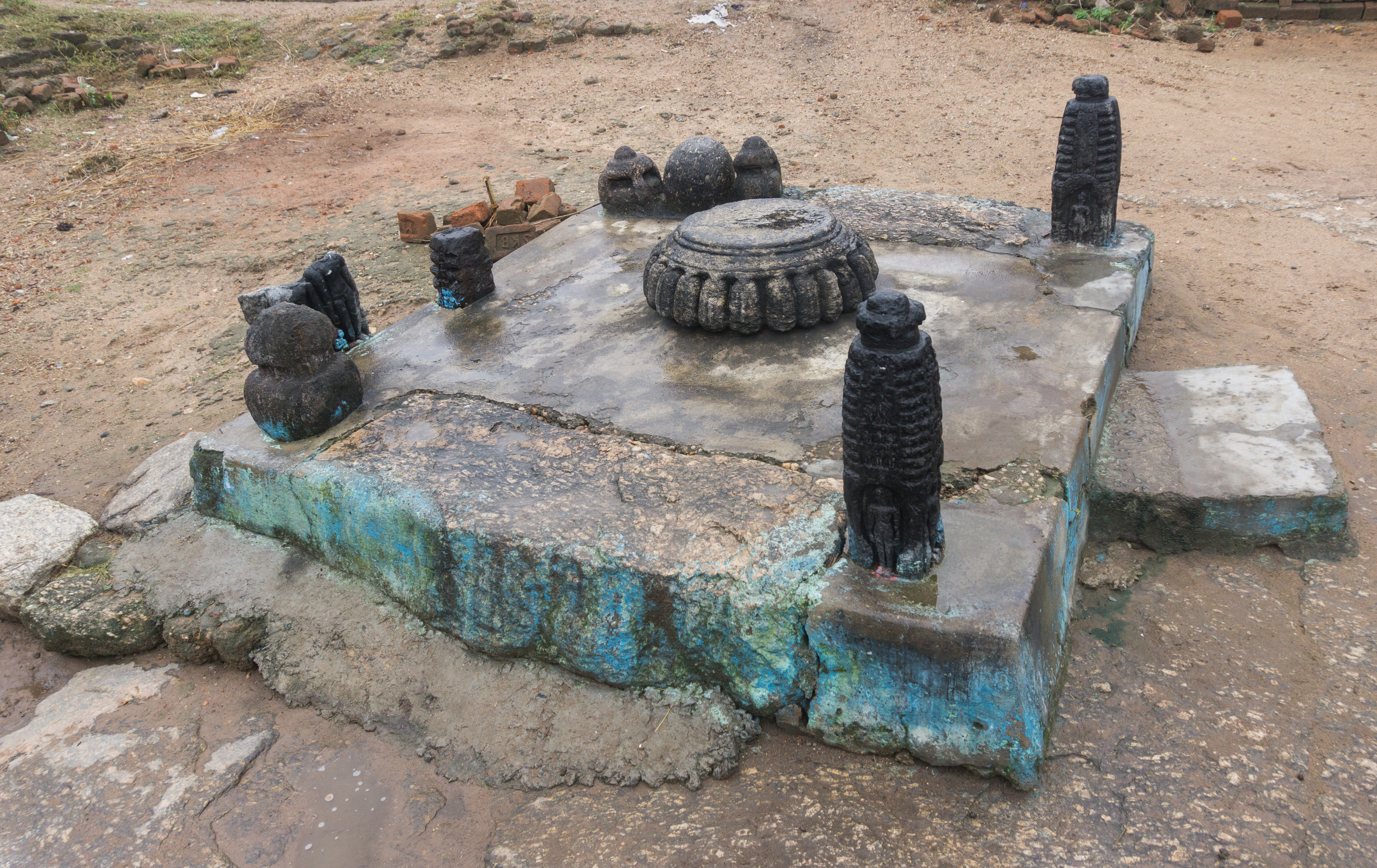
Remains of a Jain temple

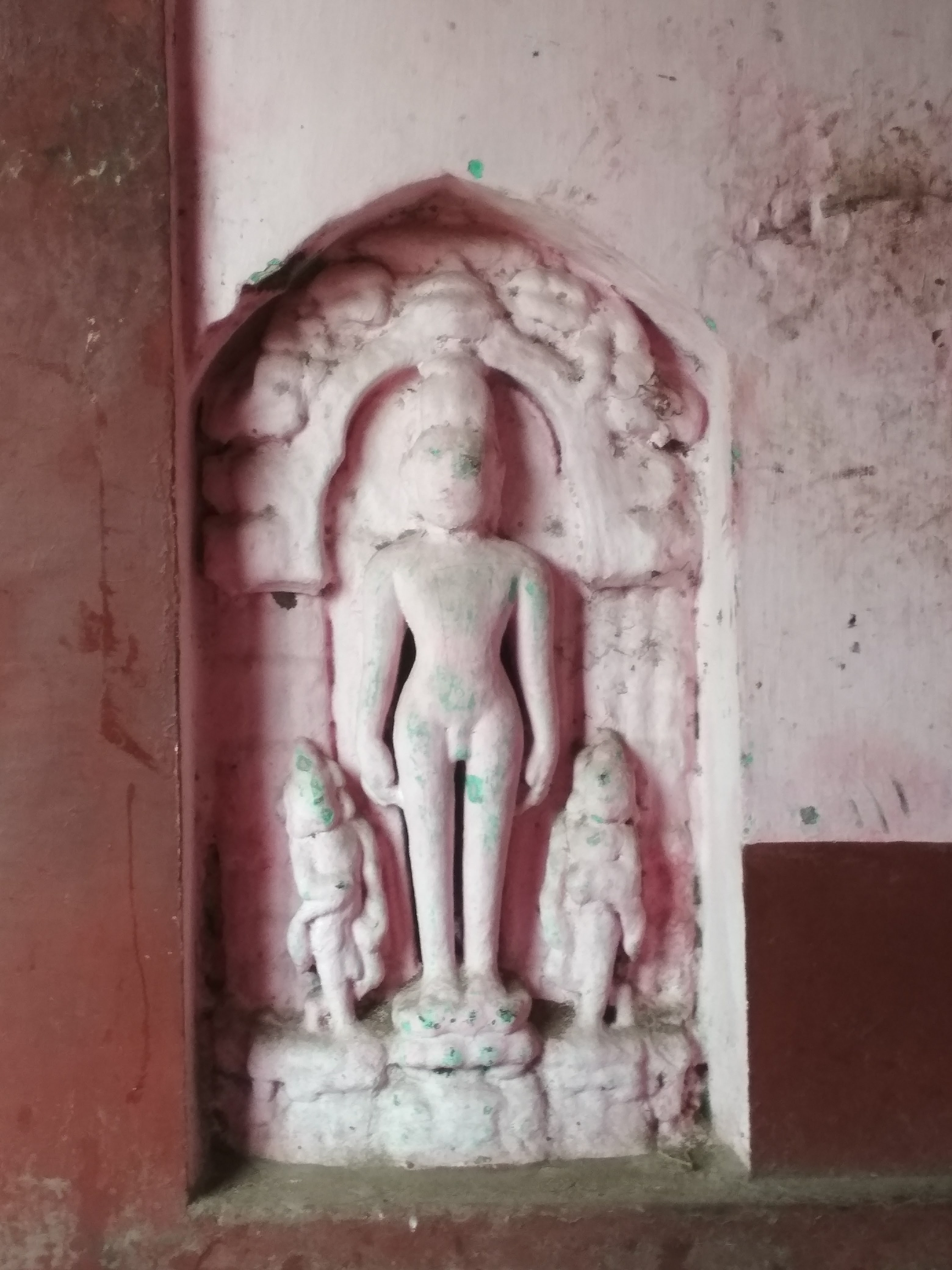
A Jain deity in a Dharmathakur temple

== Healthcare ==
Kushtor Rural Hospital, with 30 beds, is the major government medical facility in the Purulia II CD block.
