= Baghadih =

- Village
- Location in West Bengal, India Baghadih (India)
- Coordinates: 23°05′30.8″N 86°14′02.4″E
- Country: India
- State: West Bengal
- District: Purulia
- Elevation: 229 m (751 ft)

Population (2011)
  - Total: 1,208

Languages
  - Official: Bengali, English
- Time zone: UTC+5:30 (IST)
- Telephone/STD code: 03254
- Lok Sabha constituency: Purulia
- Vidhan Sabha constituency: Baghmundi
- Website: purulia.gov.in

Baghadih is a village in the Balarampur CD block in the Purulia Sadar subdivision of the Purulia district in the state of West Bengal, India. It is close to Balarampur.

== Geography ==
Places in Purulia Sadar subdivision in Purulia district
M: municipality, CT: census town, R: rural/ urban centre, H: historical/ religious centre, F: facility
Owing to space constraints in the small map, the actual locations in a larger map may vary slightly

=== Location ===
The Balarampur area is surrounded by Ajodhya Hills to the west. Dalma Wildlife Sanctuary and Dalma Hills, in Jharkhand, is situated a little away on the south.

The Bagmundi–Bandwan Upland is an area descending from the Ranchi Plateau. At some places the high lands are very steep and rise to heights ranging from 475 to 700 m. The Ajodhya Hills are spread across the Baghmundi and Balarampur areas.

=== Area overview ===
Purulia district forms the lowest step of the Chota Nagpur Plateau. The general scenario is undulating land with scattered hills. Purulia Sadar subdivision covers the central portion of the district. 83.80% of the population of the subdivision lives in rural areas. The map alongside shows some urbanization around Purulia city. 18.58% of the population, the highest among the subdivisions of the district, lives in urban areas. There are 4 census towns in the subdivision. The Kangsabati (locally called Kansai) flows through the subdivision. The subdivision has old temples, some of them belonging to the 11th century or earlier. The focus is on education - the university, the sainik school, the Ramakrishna Mission Vidyapith at Bongabari, the upcoming medical college at Hatuara, et al.

Note: The map alongside presents some of the notable locations in the subdivision. All places marked in the map are linked in the larger full screen map.

== Demographics ==
As per 2011 Census of India Baghadih had a total population of 1,208 of which 645 (53%) were males and 563 (47%) were females. Population below 6 years was 182. The total number of literates in Baghadih was 682 (66.47% of the population over 6 years).

== Civic administration ==
=== CD block HQ ===
The headquarters of the Balarampur CD block are located at Baghadih.

== Transport ==
SH 4 running from Jhalda (in Purulia district) to Junput (in Purba Medinipur district) passes through Baghadih.

The Adra-Chandil section of the Asansol-Tatanagar-Kharagpur line of South Eastern Railway passes through this CD Block and the nearest station is Barabhum railway station.
