= Anaijambad =

- Village
- Location in West Bengal, India Anaijambad (India)
- Coordinates: 23.2787°N 86.4424°E
- Country: India
- State: West Bengal
- District: Purulia

Languages
  - Official: Bengali, English
- Time zone: UTC+5:30 (IST)
- PIN: 723148
- ISO 3166 code: IN-WB

Anaijambad (also referred to as Anai, Mahadeb Berya) is a village, situated near Purulia town, in the Purulia II CD block in the Purulia Sadar subdivision of the Purulia district in the Indian state of West Bengal.

== History ==
Purulia had the largest concentration of Jain temples in the western part of Bengal, during 10th-13th century. While many of them crumbled with time, a few survived the ravages of nature - as for example, the temples at Pakbirra, Deulghata, Deulia and Banda

== Geography ==
Places in Purulia Sadar subdivision in Purulia district
M: municipality, CT: census town, R: rural/ urban centre, H: historical/ religious centre, F: facility
Owing to space constraints in the small map, the actual locations in a larger map may vary slightly

=== Location ===
Anaijambad is located at 23.2787°N 86.4424°E.

=== Area overview ===
Purulia district forms the lowest step of the Chota Nagpur Plateau. The general scenario is undulating land with scattered hills. Purulia Sadar subdivision covers the central portion of the district. 83.80% of the population of the subdivision lives in rural areas. The map alongside shows some urbanization around Purulia city. 18.58% of the population, the highest among the subdivisions of the district, lives in urban areas. There are 4 census towns in the subdivision. The Kangsabati (locally called Kansai) flows through the subdivision. The subdivision has old temples, some of them belonging to the 11th century or earlier. The focus is on education - the university, the sainik school, the Ramakrishna Mission Vidyapith at Bongabari, the upcoming medical college at Hatuara, et al.

Note: The map alongside presents some of the notable locations in the subdivision. All places marked in the map are linked in the larger full screen map.

== Demographics ==
According to the 2011 Census of India, Anai had a total population of 1,032, of which 542 (53%) were males and 490 (47%) were females. There were 121 persons in the age range of 0-6 years. The total number of literate persons in Anai was 601 (65.97% of the population over 6 years).

== Education ==
Anai Jambad PSDJ Junior High School is a Bengali-medium coeducational institution established in 1973. It has arrangements for teaching from class V to class X.

== Culture ==
The Digambar Jain temple at Anaijambad was established in 1973. It houses six statues of four tirthankaras. “The statues are housed within the simple looking temple and are fixed upon an elevated platform”. These were collected from different villages. The Kharkhari Sarak community of neighbouring Dhanbad took the initiative to build the temple.

The statues in the picture below are as follows from left to right:
1. Rishabhanatha (1st Tirthankara)
2. Chandraprabha (8th Tirthankara)
3. Parshavanatha (23 rd Tirthankara)
4. Parshavanatha (23 rd Tirthankara)
5. Kunthunatha (17th Tirthankars)
6. Chandraprabha (8th Tirthankara)

== Anaijambad picture gallery ==
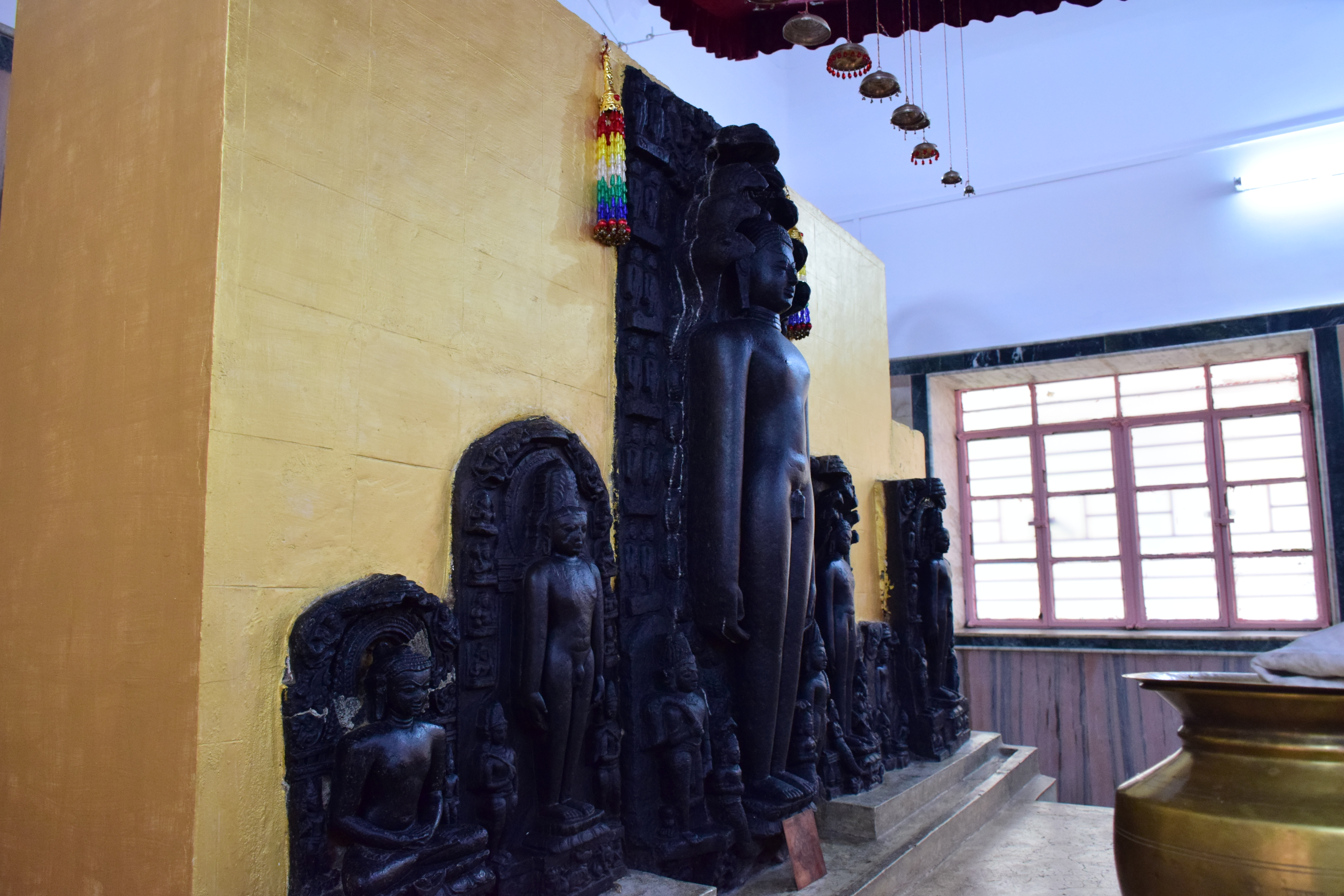
Statues of Tirthankars

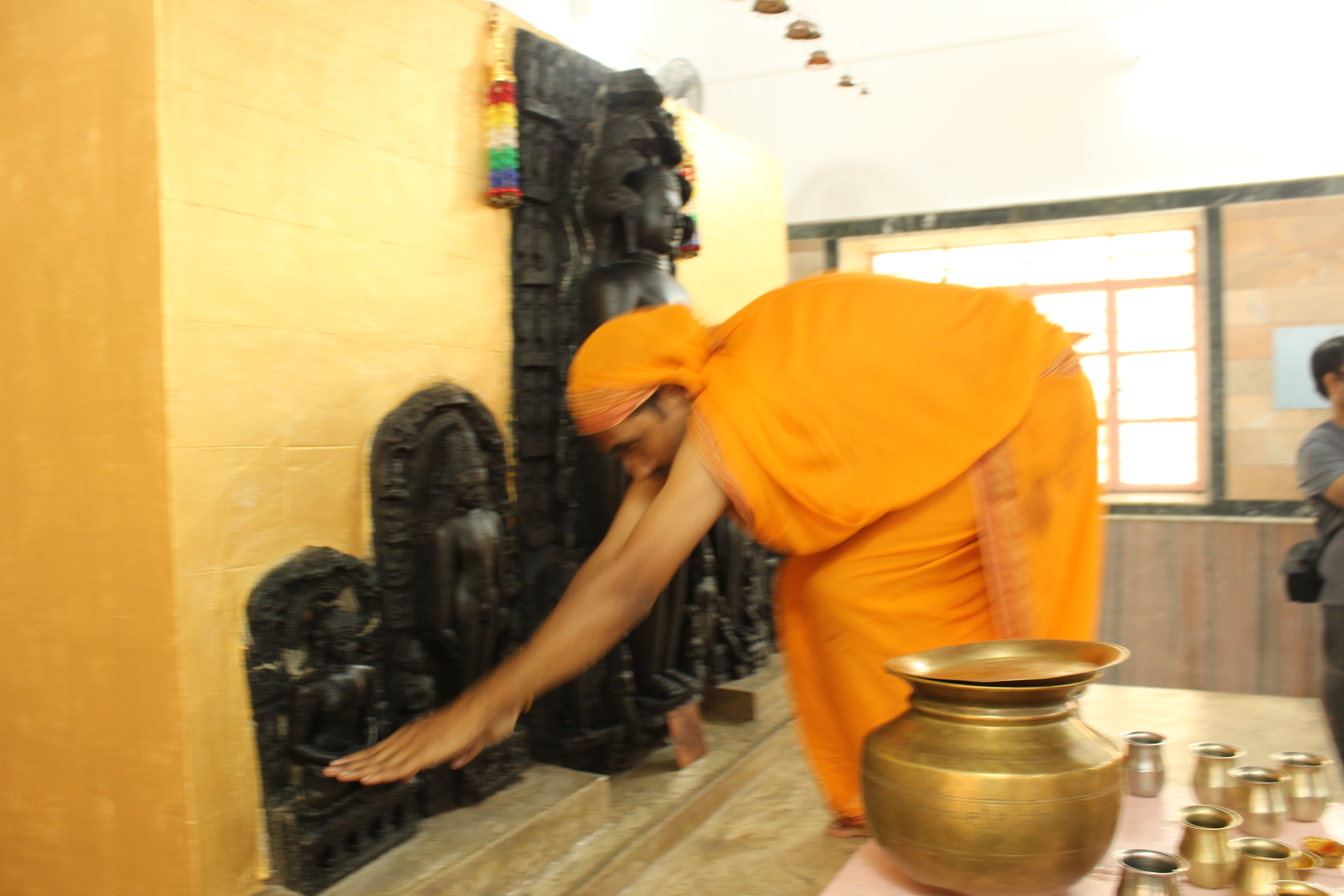
Jain rituals

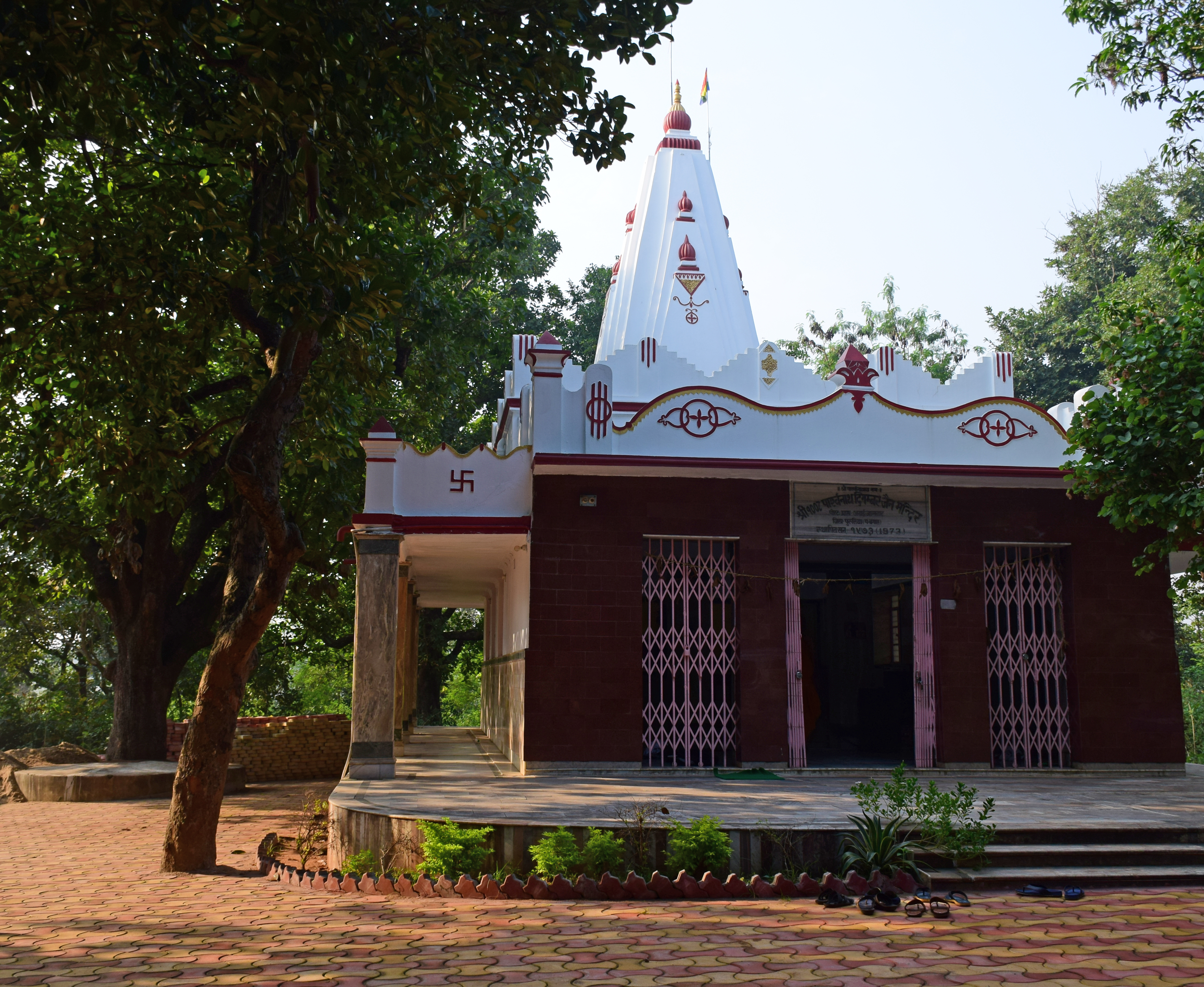
The Digambar Jain temple
