= Chakda, Purulia =

Chakda
- Village
- Location in West Bengal, India Chakda (India)
- Coordinates: 23°18′55.7″N 86°20′10.4″E
- Country: India
- State: West Bengal
- District: Purulia

Population (2011)
  - Total: 3,275

Languages
  - Official: Bengali, English
- Time zone: UTC+5:30 (IST)
- PIN: 723102 (Kotloi)
- Telephone/STD code: 03251
- Lok Sabha constituency: Purulia
- Vidhan Sabha constituency: Balarampur
- Website: purulia.gov.in

Chakda is a village in the Purulia I CD block in the Purulia Sadar subdivision of the Purulia district in the state of West Bengal, India.

== Geography ==
Places in Purulia Sadar subdivision in Purulia district
M: municipality, CT: census town, R: rural/ urban centre, H: historical/ religious centre, F: facility
Owing to space constraints in the small map, the actual locations in a larger map may vary slightly

=== Location ===
Chakda is located at 23°18′55.7″N 86°20′10.4″E.

=== Area overview ===
Purulia district forms the lowest step of the Chota Nagpur Plateau. The general scenario is undulating land with scattered hills. Purulia Sadar subdivision covers the central portion of the district. 83.80% of the population of the subdivision lives in rural areas. The map alongside shows some urbanization around Purulia city. 18.58% of the population, the highest among the subdivisions of the district, lives in urban areas. There are 4 census towns in the subdivision. The Kangsabati (locally called Kansai) flows through the subdivision. The subdivision has old temples, some of them belonging to the 11th century or earlier. The focus is on education - the university, the sainik school, the Ramakrishna Mission Vidyapith at Bongabari, the upcoming medical college at Hatuara, et al.

Note: The map alongside presents some of the notable locations in the subdivision. All places marked in the map are linked in the larger full screen map.

== Demographics ==
As per 2011 Census of India Chakda had a total population of 3,275 of which 1,694 (52%) were males and 1,581 (48%) were females. Population below 6 years was 385. The total number of literates in Chakda was 2,124 (73.49% of the population over 6 years).

== CD Block HQ ==
The headquarters of Purulia I CD Block are located at Chakda.

== Transport ==
National Highway 18 (India) running from Gobindpur (in Jharkhand) to Balasore (in Odisha) passes through Chakda.
