= Arsha, Purulia =

Arsha
- Village
- Location in West Bengal, India Arsha (India)
- Coordinates: 23°19′52.0″N 86°10′20.3″E
- Country: India
- State: West Bengal
- District: Purulia

Population (2011)
  - Total: 5,958

Languages
  - Official: Bengali, English
- Time zone: UTC+5:30 (IST)
- PIN: 723216 (Arsha)
- Telephone code: 03254
- Lok Sabha constituency: Purulia
- Vidhan Sabha constituency: Joypur
- Website: purulia.gov.in

Arsha is a village, with a police station, in the Arsha CD block in the Purulia Sadar subdivision of the Purulia district in the state of West Bengal, India.

== Geography ==
Places in Purulia Sadar subdivision in Purulia district
M: municipality, CT: census town, R: rural/ urban centre, H: historical/ religious centre, F: facility
Owing to space constraints in the small map, the actual locations in a larger map may vary slightly

=== Location ===
Arsha is located at 23°19′52.0″N 86°10′20.3″E.

=== Area overview ===
Purulia district forms the lowest step of the Chota Nagpur Plateau. The general scenario is undulating land with scattered hills. Purulia Sadar subdivision covers the central portion of the district. 83.80% of the population of the subdivision lives in rural areas. The map alongside shows some urbanization around Purulia city. 18.58% of the population, the highest among the subdivisions of the district, lives in urban areas. There are 4 census towns in the subdivision. The Kangsabati (locally called Kansai) flows through the subdivision. The subdivision has old temples, some of them belonging to the 11th century or earlier. The focus is on education - the university, the sainik school, the Ramakrishna Mission Vidyapith at Bongabari, the upcoming medical college at Hatuara, et al.

Note: The map alongside presents some of the notable locations in the subdivision. All places marked in the map are linked in the larger full screen map.

== Demographics ==
According to the 2011 Census of India, Arsha had a total population of 5,958 of which 3,057 (51%) were males and 2,901 (49%) were females. There were 1,047 persons in the age range of 0–6 years. The total number of literate persons in Arsha was 2,725 (55.49% of the population over 6 years).

== Civic administration ==
=== Police station ===
Arsha police station has jurisdiction over the Arsha CD block and parts of the Purulia I CD block. The area covered is 187.5 km^{2} and the population covered is 154,542.

== Education ==
Arsha College was established in 2009. Affiliated with the Sidho Kanho Birsha University, it offers honours courses in Bengali, Santali, English, history, education, geography, mathematics, and general courses in arts and science.

== Healthcare ==
There is a primary health centre with 10 beds at Arsha.
