= Sirkabad =

- Village
- Location in West Bengal, India Sirkabad (India)
- Coordinates: 23°16′10.0″N 86°11′34.3″E
- Country: India
- State: West Bengal
- District: Purulia

Population (2011)
  - Total: 6,288

Languages
  - Official: Bengali, English
- Time zone: UTC+5:30 (IST)
- PIN: 723154 (Sirkabad)
- Telephone/STD code: 03254
- Lok Sabha constituency: Purulia
- Vidhan Sabha constituency: Baghmundi
- Website: purulia.gov.in

Sirkabad is a village in the Arsha CD block in the Purulia Sadar subdivision of the Purulia district in the state of West Bengal, India.

== Geography ==
Places in Purulia Sadar subdivision in Purulia district
M: municipality, CT: census town, R: rural/ urban centre, H: historical/ religious centre, F: facility
Owing to space constraints in the small map, the actual locations in a larger map may vary slightly

=== Location ===
Sirkabad is located at 23°16′10.0″N 86°11′34.3″E.

Sirkabad lies in the vicinity of the Ajodhya Hills and the Reserve Forest Area.

=== Area overview ===
Purulia district forms the lowest step of the Chota Nagpur Plateau. The general scenario is undulating land with scattered hills. Purulia Sadar subdivision covers the central portion of the district. 83.80% of the population of the subdivision lives in rural areas. The map alongside shows some urbanization around Purulia city. 18.58% of the population, the highest among the subdivisions of the district, lives in urban areas. There are 4 census towns in the subdivision. The Kangsabati (locally called Kansai) flows through the subdivision. The subdivision has old temples, some of them belonging to the 11th century or earlier. The focus is on education - the university, the sainik school, the Ramakrishna Mission Vidyapith at Bongabari, the upcoming medical college at Hatuara, et al.

Note: The map alongside presents some of the notable locations in the subdivision. All places marked in the map are linked in the larger full screen map.

== Demographics ==
According to the 2011 Census of India, Sirkabad had a total population of 6,288 of which 3,284 (52%) were males and 3,004 (48%) were females. There were 924 persons in the age range of 0-6 years. The total number of literate persons in Sirkabad was 3,339 (62.25% of the population over 6 years).

== Civic administration ==
=== CD block HQ ===
The headquarters of the Arsha CD Block are located at Sirkabad.

== Transport ==
There is a road from Sirkabad to Baghmundi over the Ajodhya Hills.

== Education ==
Sirkabad High School is a Bengali medium, co-educational higher secondary school (classes VI to XII). It was established in 1956 by the Department of Education.

== Healthcare ==
Sirkabad Rural Hospital, with 30 beds at Sirkabad, is the major government medical facility in the Arsha CD block.
