= Balarampur, Purulia =

Balarampur
- Census Town
- Location in West Bengal, India Balarampur (India)
- Coordinates: 23.12°N 86.22°E
- Country: India
- State: West Bengal
- District: Purulia
- Elevation: 300 m (980 ft)

Population (2011)
  - Total: 24,431

Languages
  - Official: Bengali, Hindi
- Time zone: UTC+5:30 (IST)
- PIN: 723143
- Telephone code: 03252
- Vehicle registration: WB
- Lok Sabha constituency: Purulia
- Vidhan Sabha constituency: Balarampur
- Website: purulia.gov.in

Balarampur is a census town in the Balarampur CD block in Purulia Sadar subdivision of the Purulia district in the state of West Bengal, India. Before Indian independence in 1947, it was the capital of an expensive zamindari of Barabhum in British India.

== Geography ==
Places in Purulia Sadar subdivision in Purulia district
M: municipality, CT: census town, R: rural/ urban centre, H: historical/ religious centre, F: facility
Owing to space constraints in the small map, the actual locations in a larger map may vary slightly

=== Location ===
Balarampur is located at 23.12°N 86.22°E. It has an average elevation of 300 m (984 ft).

=== Area overview ===
Purulia district forms the lowest step of the Chota Nagpur Plateau. The general scenario is undulating land with scattered hills. Purulia Sadar subdivision covers the central portion of the district. 83.80% of the population of the subdivision lives in rural areas. The map alongside shows some urbanization around Purulia city. 18.58% of the population, the highest among the subdivisions of the district, lives in urban areas. There are 4 census towns in the subdivision. The Kangsabati (locally called Kansai) flows through the subdivision. The subdivision has old temples, some of them belonging to the 11th century or earlier. The focus is on education - the university, the sainik school, the Ramakrishna Mission Vidyapith at Bongabari, the upcoming medical college at Hatuara, et al.

Note: The map alongside presents some of the notable locations in the subdivision. All places marked in the map are linked in the larger full screen map.

== Civic administration ==
=== Police station ===
Balarampur police station has jurisdiction over the Balarampur CD block. The area covered is 299.5 km^{2} and the population covered is 139,744. It has 12.39 km inter-state border with Nimdih PS in the Seraikela Kharsawan district of Jharkhand.

== Demographics ==
According to the 2011 Census of India Balarampur had a total population of 24,431 of which 12,681 (52%) were males and 11,750 (48%) were females. There were 3,160 persons in the age range of 0–6 years. The total number of literate persons in Balarampur was 15,948 (74.98% of the population over 6 years).

As of 2001 India census, Balarampur had a population of 21,824. Males constitute 52% of the population and females 48%. Balarampur has an average literacy rate of 58%, lower than the national average of 59.5%; with 63% of the males and 37% of females literate. 14% of the population is under 6 years of age.

== Infrastructure ==
According to the District Census Handbook 2011, Puruliya, Balarampur covered an area of 9.51 km^{2}. Among the civic amenities, the protected water supply involved overhead tank, service reservoir, tap water from treated sources, covered wells. It had 1,855 domestic electric connections. Among the medical facilities it had 1 dispensary/ health centre, 1 maternity and child welfare clinic, 1 veterinary hospital, 12 medicine shops. Among the educational facilities it had were 2 primary schools, 1 secondary school, 1 senior secondary school. Three important commodities it produced were paddy, rice and vegetables.

== Economics ==
Balarmpur is a centre of shellac industry, business and vegetable market.

== Transport ==
Two important roads the National Highway 32 and the State Highway 4 cross at this town and this junction is called Balarampur Chawk. Barabhum railway station serves this town.

== Education ==
Balarampur College was established in 1985. Affiliated with the Sidho Kanho Birsha University, it offers honours courses in Bengali, English, history, political science, geography, philosophy, financial accounting, mathematics, and general courses in arts, science and commerce.

== Healthcare ==
Bansgarh Rural Hospital, with 30 beds at Rangadih, is the major government facility in the Balarampur CD block. Gandhi Memorial Hospital at Bansgarh, with 15 beds, is run by a NGO.
