= Deulbhira =

- Village
- Location in West Bengal, India Deulbhira (India)
- Coordinates: 22.9547°N 87.1637°E
- Country: India
- State: West Bengal
- District: Bankura

Population (2011)
  - Total: 669

Languages
  - Official: Bengali, Santali, English
- Time zone: UTC+5:30 (IST)
- PIN: 722152
- Telephone/STD code: 03244
- Lok Sabha constituency: Bankura
- Vidhan Sabha constituency: Taldangra
- Website: bankura.gov.in

Deulbhira (also called Deulbhirya) is a village in the Taldangra CD block in the Khatra subdivision of the Bankura district in the state of West Bengal, India.

== Geography ==
Places in Khatra subdivision in Bankura district
CT: census town, R: rural/ urban centre, C: craft centre, T: ancient/ temple centre
Owing to space constraints in the small map, the actual locations in a larger map may vary slightly

=== Location ===
Deulbhira is located at 22.9547°N 87.1637°E.

Note: The map alongside presents some of the notable locations in the subdivision. All places marked in the map are linked in the larger full screen map.

== Demographics ==
According to the 2011 Census of India, Deulbhira had a total population of 669, of which 333 (50%) were males and 336 (50%) were females. There were 78 persons in the age range of 0–6 years. The total number of literate persons in Deulbhira was 519 (87.82% of the population over 6 years).

== Culture ==
David J. McCutchion says that in the remote areas of old Manbhum district the Jains went on building temples till the 13th century, and many of them are still standing at Bahulara, Harmasra, Deulbhirya, Ambikanagar, Charra, Pakbirra, Tuisama or Dcoli, in Bankura and Purulia districts.

According to the Archaeological Survey of India information board at the temple, it was built around the 13th century. The statue of Parshvanatha, originally in the temple, is now in the Indian Museum at Kolkata. See Wikimedia Commons media for close up pictures of the ASI information boards.

See also - Bengal temple architecture

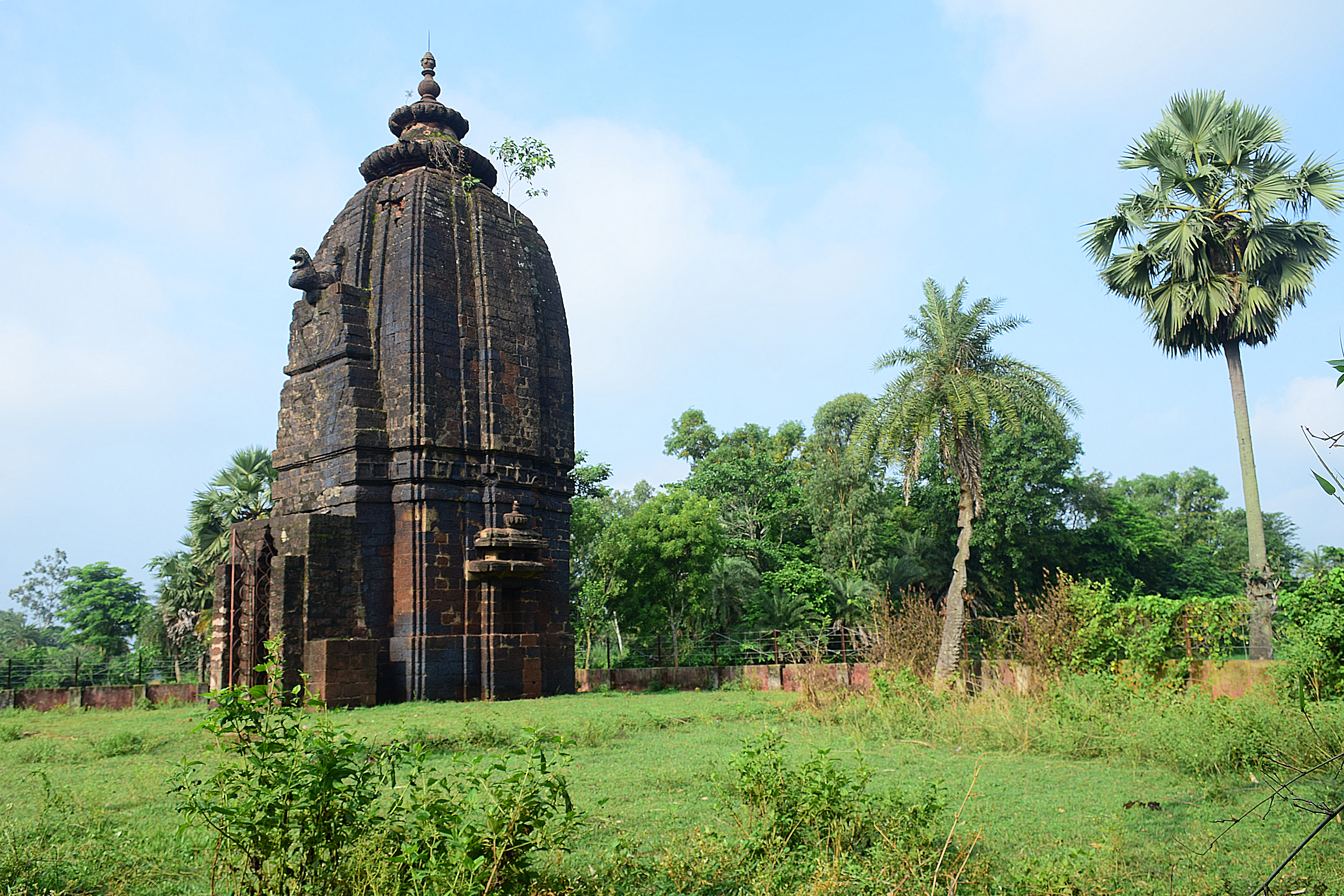
Parshvanatha temple

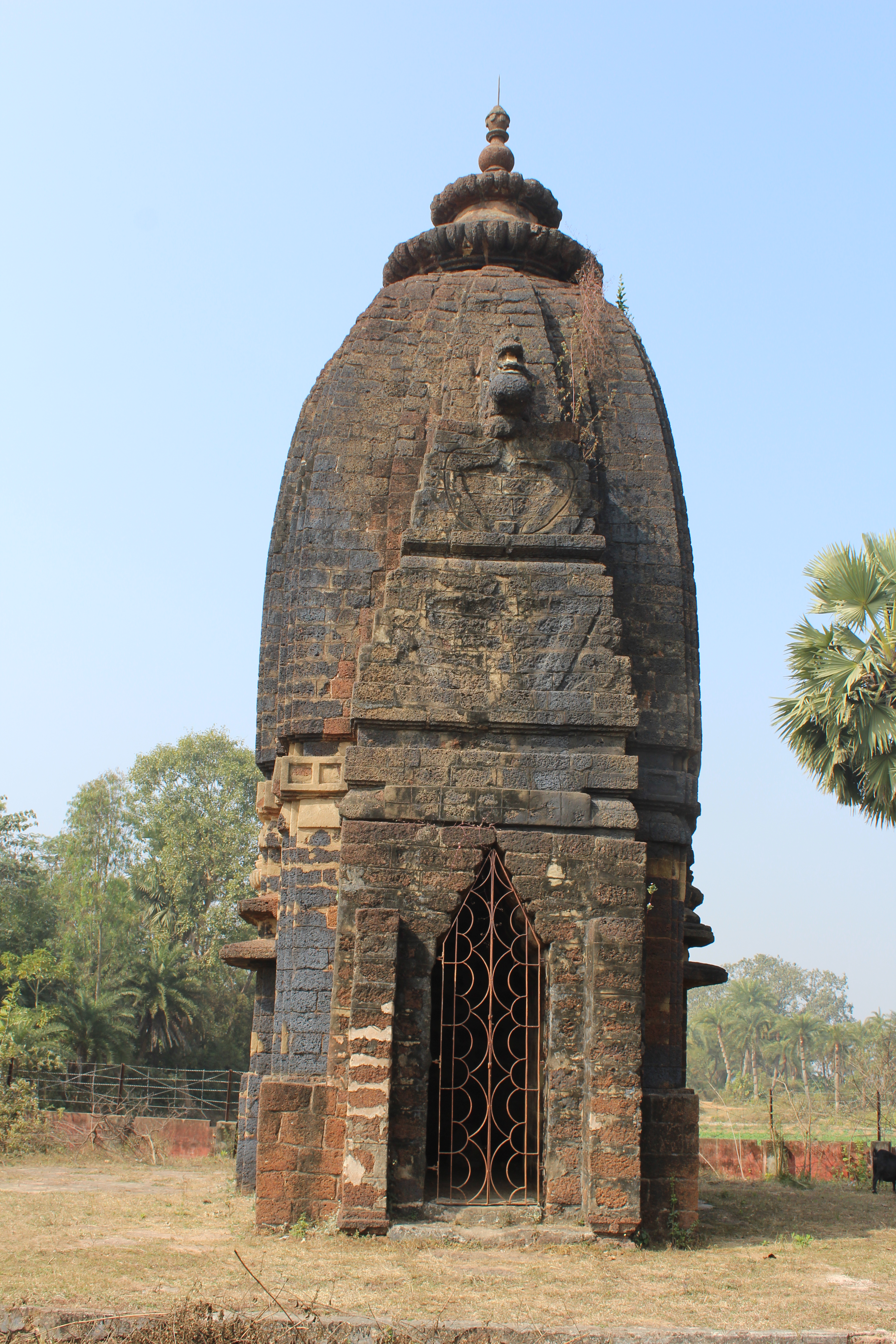
Parshvanatha temple

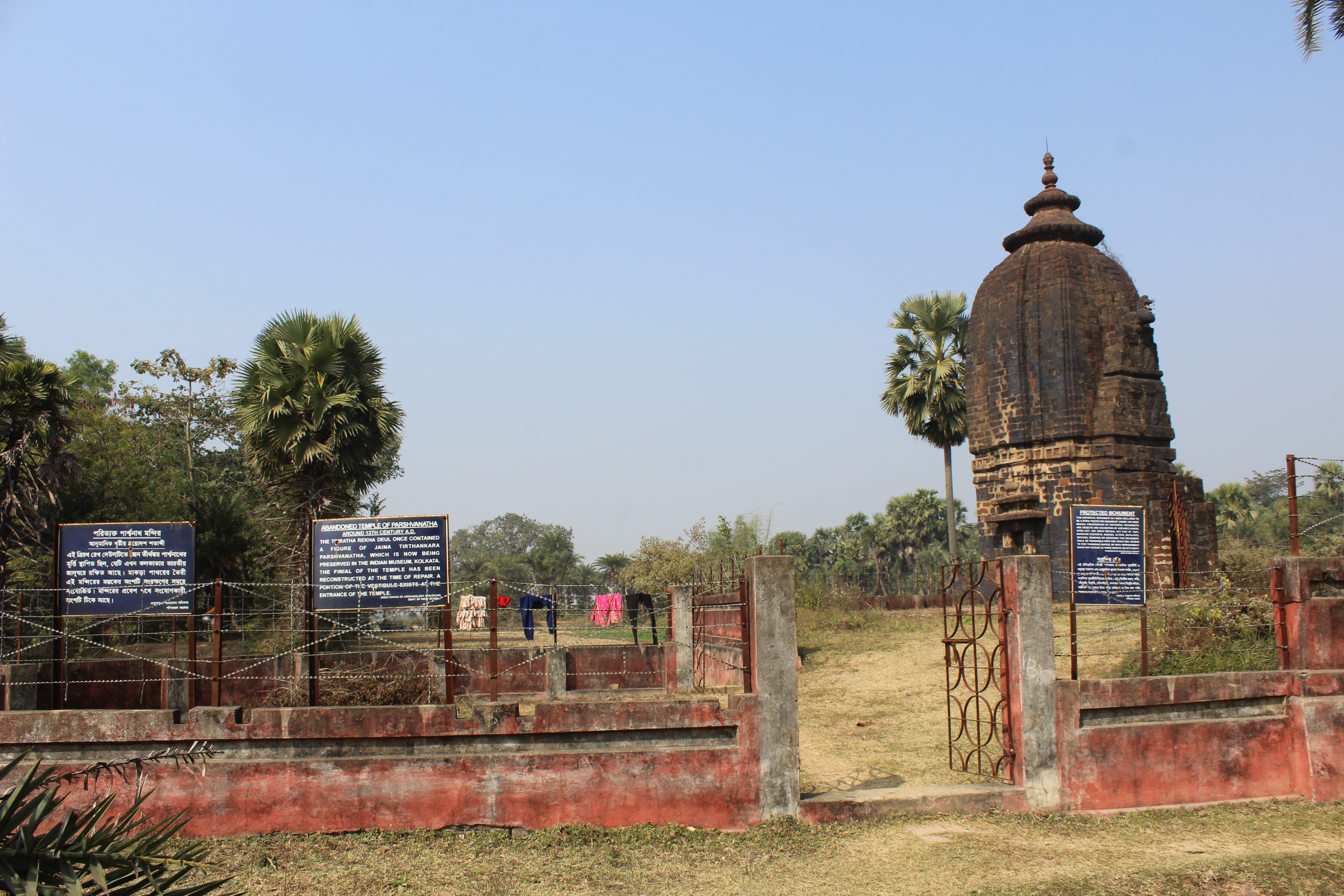
Parshvanatha temple

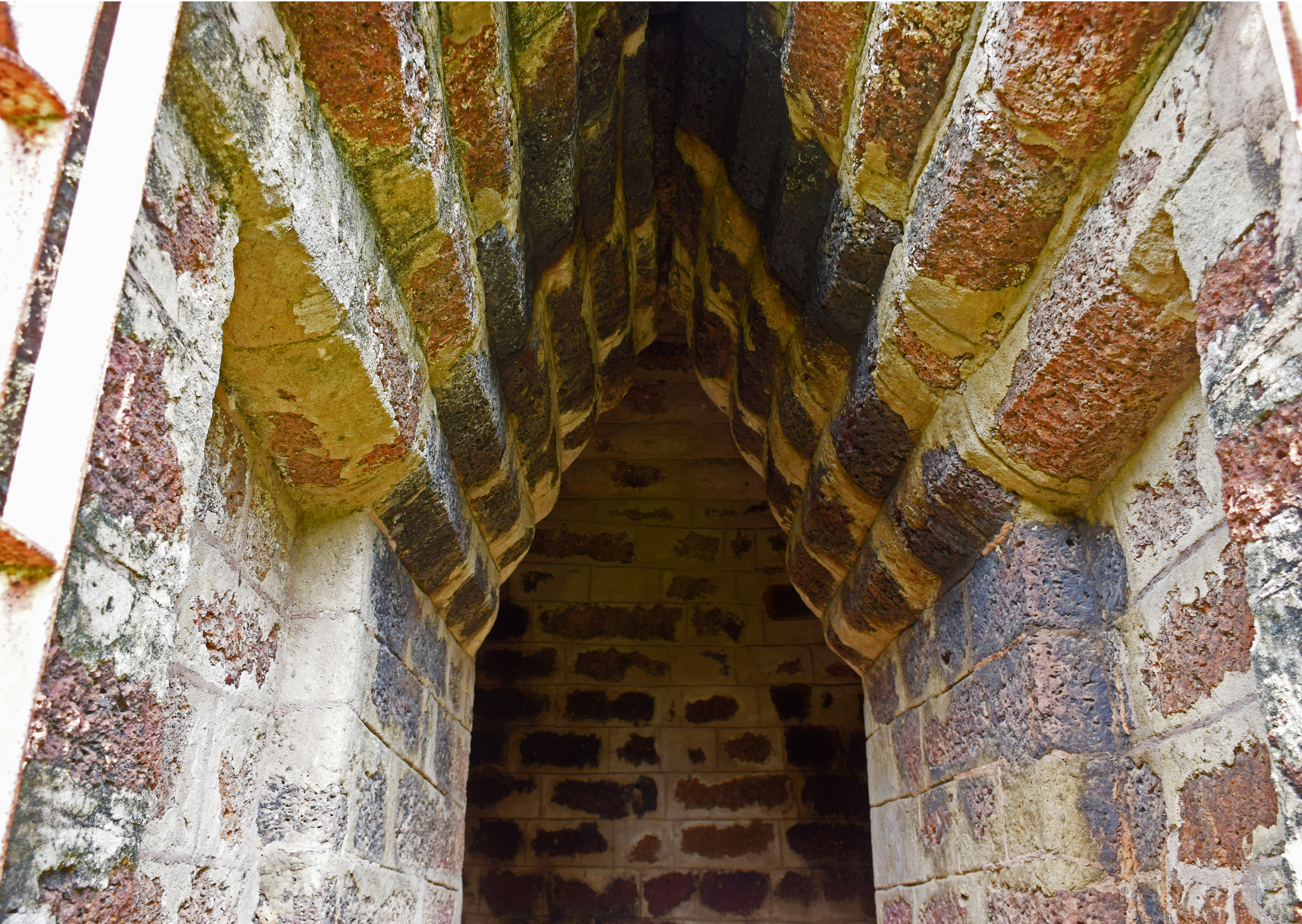
Close-up of entrance
