= Arsha (community development block) =

- Community development block
- Coordinates: 23°19′52.0″N 86°10′20.3″E
- Country: India
- State: West Bengal
- District: Purulia
- Parliamentary constituency: Purulia
- Assembly constituency: Balarampur, Baghmundi, Joypur

Area
  - Total: 375.04 km^{2} (144.80 sq mi)

Population (2011)
  - Total: 154,736
  - Density: 412.59/km^{2} (1,068.6/sq mi)

Languages
  - Official: Bengali, Santali, English
- Time zone: UTC+5.30 (IST)
- PIN: 723216 (Arsha); 723154 (Sirkabad)
- Telephone/STD code: 03254
- Vehicle registration: WB-55, WB-56
- Literacy Rate: 54.78%
- Website: http://purulia.gov.in/

Arsha is a community development block (CD block) that forms an administrative division in the Purulia Sadar subdivision of the Purulia district in the Indian state of West Bengal.

== History ==
=== Background ===
The Jaina Bhagavati-Sutra of the 5th century AD mentions that Purulia was one of the sixteen mahajanapadas and was a part of the kingdom known as Vajra-bhumi in ancient times. In 1833, the Manbhum district was carved out of the Jungle Mahals district, with headquarters at Manbazar. In 1838, the headquarters was transferred to Purulia. After independence, when Manbhum district was a part of Bihar, efforts were made to impose Hindi on the Bengali-speaking majority of the district and it led to the Bengali Language Movement (Manbhum). In 1956, the Manbhum district was partitioned between Bihar and West Bengal under the States Reorganization Act and the Bihar and West Bengal (Transfer of Territories) Act 1956.

=== Red corridor ===
106 districts spanning 10 states across India, described as being part of the left wing extremism activities, constitutes the Red corridor. In West Bengal, the districts of Paschim Medinipur, Bankura, Purulia and Birbhum are part of the Red corridor. However, as of July 2016, there had been no reported incidents of Maoist related activities from these districts for the previous 4 years.

The CPI (Maoist) extremism affected the CD blocks in the Purulia district were: Jhalda I, Jhalda II, Arsha, Baghmundi, Balarampur, Barabazar, Manbazar II and Bandwan. Certain reports also included Manbazar I and Joypur CD blocks and some times indicted the whole of Purulia district.

The Lalgarh movement, which started attracting attention after the failed assassination attempt on Buddhadeb Bhattacharjee, then chief minister of West Bengal, in the Salboni area of the Paschim Medinipur district, on 2 November 2008 and the police action that followed, had also spread over to these areas. The movement was not just a political struggle but an armed struggle that concurrently took the look of a social struggle. A large number of CPI (M) activists were killed. Although the epi-centre of the movement was Lalgarh, it was spread across 19 police stations in three adjoining districts – Paschim Medinipur, Bankura and Purulia, all thickly forested and near the border with Jharkhand. The deployment of the CRPF and other forces started on 11 June 2009. The movement came to an end after the 2011 state assembly elections and change of government in West Bengal. The death of Kishenji, the Maoist commander, on 24 November 2011, was the last major landmark.

== Geography ==
CD blocks in Purulia district

Arsha is located at 23°19′52.0″N 86°10′20.3″E.

The Arsha CD block is bounded by the Joypur CD block on a part of the north, the Purulia I CD block on a part of the north and on the east, the Barabazar, Balarampur and Baghmundi CD blocks on the south, and the Jhalda II CD block on the west.

The Arsha CD block is located in the central part of the district. The Kangsabati River forms the boundary between the Arsha and Joypur and Purulia I CD blocks. The upper Kangsabati basin has undulating land and the elevation rises from 200 to 300 m and the general slope is from west to east and south-east.

The Arsha CD block has an area of 375.04 km^{2}. It has 1 panchayat samity, 8 gram panchayats, 101 gram sansads (village councils), 96 mouzas and 95 inhabited villages. Arsha police station serves this block. Headquarters of this CD block are at Sirkabad.

Gram panchayats in the Arsha block/panchayat samiti are: Arsha, Beldih, Chatuhansa, Hensla, Hetgugui, Mankiari, Puara and Sirkabad.

== Demographics ==
=== Population ===
According to the 2011 Census of India Arsha CD block had a total population of 154,736, all of which were rural. There were 78,398 (51%) males and 76,338 (49%) females. There were 26,208 persons in the age range of 0 to 6 years. The Scheduled Castes numbered 18,294 (11.82%) and the Scheduled Tribes numbered 33,568 (21.69%).

According to the 2001 census, the Arsha block had a total population of 129,108, out of which 65,996 were males and 63,112 were females. The Arsha block registered a population growth of 15.36 per cent during the 1991-2001 decade. Decadal growth for the Purulia district was 13.96 per cent. Decadal growth in West Bengal was 17.84 per cent.

Large villages (with 4,000+ population) in the Arsha CD block are (2011 census figures in brackets): Arsha (5,958), Palpal (5,511), Rangamati (4,365), Sirkabad (6,288), Chatuhansa (4,388), Hesla (4,574) and Satra (5,857).

Other villages in the Arsha CD block are (2011 census figures in brackets): Puara (3,900), Beldi (3,337), Mankiari (1,784) and Hetgugui (3,029).

=== Literacy ===
According to the 2011 census the total number of literate persons in the Arsha CD block was 70,413 (54.78% of the population over 6 years) out of which males numbered 45,876 (70.36% of the male population over 6 years) and females numbered 24,537 (38.75%) of the female population over 6 years). The gender disparity (the difference between female and male literacy rates) was 31.61%.

Literacy in CD blocks of
Purulia district
Purulia Sadar subdivision
Arsha – 57.48%
Balarampur – 60.40%
Hura – 68.79%
Purulia I – 78.37%
Purulia II – 63.39%
Manbazar subdivision
Barabazar – 63.27
Bandwan – 61.38%
Manbazar I – 63.78%
Manbazar II – 60.27%
Puncha – 68.14%
Jhalda subdivision
Baghmundi – 57.17%
Jhalda I – 66.18%
Jhalda II – 54.76%
Joypur – 57.94%
Raghunathpur subdivision
Para – 65.62%
Raghunathpur I – 67.36%
Raghunathpur II – 67.29%
Neturia – 65.14%
Santuri – 64.15%
Kashipur – 71.06%
2011 Census: CD Block Wise

Primary Census Abstract Data

See also – List of West Bengal districts ranked by literacy rate

=== Language and religion ===
Religion in Arsha CD block (2011)
Hinduism	77.27%
Other (tribal religion)	15.55%
Islam	6.68%
Other or not stated	0.38%

In the 2011 census Hindus numbered 119,561 and formed 77.27% of the population in the Arsha CD block. Muslims numbered 10,344 and formed 6.68% of the population. Others numbered 24,861 and formed 16.05% of the population. Others include Christian, Addi Bassi, Marang Boro, Santal, Saranath, Sari Dharma, Sarna, Alchchi, Bidin, Sant, Saevdharm, Seran, Saran, Sarin, Kheria, and other religious communities. In 2001, Hindus were 84.89%, Muslims 6.81% and tribal religions 7.92% of the population respectively.

Languages of Arsha CD block (2011)
1. Bengali (80.2%)
2. Santali (13.8%)
3. Kurmali (5.17%)
4. Others (0.86%)

At the time of the 2011 census, 80.17% of the population spoke Bengali, 13.80% Santali and 5.17% Kurmali as their first language.

== Rural Poverty ==
According to the Rural Household Survey in 2005, 32.85% of total number of families were BPL families in Purulia district. According to a World Bank report, as of 2012, 31-38% of the population in Purulia, Murshidabad and Uttar Dinajpur districts were below poverty level, the highest among the districts of West Bengal, which had an average 20% of the population below poverty line.

== Economy ==
=== Livelihood ===
Livelihood
in Arsha CD block
1. Cultivators (27.1%)
2. Agricultural labourers (41.3%)
3. Household industries (12.6%)
4. Other Workers (19.0%)

In the Arsha CD block in 2011, among the class of total workers, cultivators numbered 19,904 and formed 27.08%, agricultural labourers numbered 30,374 and formed 41.33%, household industry workers numbered 9,266 and formed 12.61% and other workers numbered 13,953 and formed 18.98%. Total workers numbered 73,497 and formed 47.50% of the total population, and non-workers numbered 81,239 and formed 52.50% of the population.

Note: In the census records a person is considered a cultivator, if the person is engaged in cultivation/ supervision of land owned by self/government/institution. When a person who works on another person's land for wages in cash or kind or share, is regarded as an agricultural labourer. Household industry is defined as an industry conducted by one or more members of the family within the household or village, and one that does not qualify for registration as a factory under the Factories Act. Other workers are persons engaged in some economic activity other than cultivators, agricultural labourers and household workers. It includes factory, mining, plantation, transport and office workers, those engaged in business and commerce, teachers, entertainment artistes and so on.

=== Infrastructure ===
There are 95 inhabited villages in the Arsha CD block, as per the District Census Handbook, Puruliya, 2011. 92 villages (96.84%) have power supply. 94 villages (98.95%) have drinking water supply. 18 villages (18.95%) have post offices. 91 villages (95.79%) have telephones (including landlines, public call offices and mobile phones). 19 villages (20.00%) have pucca (paved) approach roads and 28 villages (29.47%) have transport communication (includes bus service, rail facility and navigable waterways). 5 villages (5.26%) have banks.

=== Agriculture ===
In 2013-14, persons engaged in agriculture in the Arsha CD block could be classified as follows: bargadars 0.77%, patta (document) holders 11.59%, small farmers (possessing land between 1 and 2 hectares) 6.81%, marginal farmers (possessing land up to 1 hectare) 21.04% and agricultural labourers 59.79%.

In 2013-14, the total area irrigated in the Arsha CD block was 15,549.98 hectares, out of which 10,984.20 hectares was by canal irrigation, 3,763.71 hectares by tank water, 10.57 hectares by river lift irrigation, 192.20 hectares by open dug wells and 599.30 hectares by other means.

In 2013-14, the Arsha CD block produced 104,423 tonnes of Aman paddy, the main winter crop, from 39,094 hectares, 45 tonnes of Boro paddy from 17 hectares, 270 tonnes of wheat from 140 hectares, 226 tonnes of maize from 122 hectares, 3,175 tonnes of potatoes from 107 hectares and 7,467 tonnes of sugar cane from 150 hectares. It also produced maskalai, gram and mustard.

=== Banking ===
In 2013-14, the Arsha CD block had offices of 5 commercial bank and 1 gramin bank.

=== Backward Regions Grant Fund ===
The Purulia district is listed as a backward region and receives financial support from the Backward Regions Grant Fund. The fund, created by the Government of India, is designed to redress regional imbalances in development. As of 2012, 272 districts across the country were listed under this scheme. The list includes 11 districts of West Bengal.

== Transport ==
In 2013-14, the Arsha CD block had 6 originating/ terminating bus routes. The nearest railway station was 20 km from CD Block headquarters.

== Education ==
In 2013-14, Arsha CD Block had 134 primary schools with 16,636 students, 19 middle schools with 2,058 students, 1 high school with 653 students and 9 higher secondary schools with 13,238 students. Arsha CD Block had 1 general college with 1,056 students, 1 professional/ technical institute with 12 students and 226 institutions with 8,614 students for special and non-formal education.

See also – Education in India

According to the 2011 census, in Arsha CD block, amongst the 96 inhabited villages, 6 villages did not have a school, 44 villages had two or more primary schools, 30 villages had at least 1 primary and 1 middle school and 11 villages had at least 1 middle and 1 secondary school.

Arsha College was established at Arsha in 2009.

== Culture ==
Deulghata once had 15 temples and some small shrines, built around the 9th-10th century. The Archaeological Survey of India has taken over the place that includes three tall surviving temples.

== Healthcare ==
In 2014, the Arsha CD block had 1 block primary health centre and 2 primary health centres, with total 44 beds and 4 doctors. 4,001 patients were treated indoor and 208,674 patients were treated outdoor in the health centres and subcentres of the CD Block.

Sirkabad Rural Hospital, with 30 beds at Sirkabad, is the major government medical facility in the Arsha CD block. There are primary health centres at Kantadih (with 4 beds) and Arsha (with 10 beds).

== See also ==
- Arsha (Vidhan Sabha constituency)
