= Purulia I =

- Community development block
- Interactive map of Purulia I
- Coordinates: 23.3238140°N 86.3456726°E
- Country: India
- State: West Bengal
- District: Purulia

Government
  - Type: Community development block

Area
  - Total: 281.50 km^{2} (108.69 sq mi)
- Elevation: 240 m (790 ft)

Population (2011)
  - Total: 151,188
  - Density: 537.08/km^{2} (1,391.0/sq mi)

Languages
  - Official: Bengali, English
- Time zone: UTC+5:30 (IST)
- PIN: 723102 (Kotloi)
- Telephone/STD code: 03251
- ISO 3166 code: IN-WB
- Vehicle registration: WB-55, WB-56
- Literacy: 64.77%
- Lok Sabha constituency: Purulia
- Vidhan Sabha constituency: Purulia, Balarampur
- Website: purulia.gov.in

Purulia I is a community development block (CD block) that forms an administrative division in the Purulia Sadar subdivision of the Purulia district in the Indian state of West Bengal.

== History ==
=== Background ===
The Jaina Bhagavati-Sutra of the 5th century AD mentions that Purulia was one of the sixteen mahajanapadas and was a part of the kingdom known as Vajra-bhumi in ancient times. In 1833, Manbhum district was carved out of Jungle Mahals district, with headquarters at Manbazar. In 1838, the headquarters was transferred to Purulia. After independence, when Manbhum district was a part of Bihar, efforts were made to impose Hindi on the Bengali-speaking majority of the district and it led to the Bengali Language Movement (Manbhum). In 1956, Manbhum district was partitioned between Bihar and West Bengal under the States Reorganization Act and the Bihar and West Bengal (Transfer of Territories) Act 1956.

== Geography ==
CD blocks in Purulia district

Bhatbandh is located at 23°19′26″N 86°20′44″E.

The Purulia I CD block is located in the central part of the district. The Kangsabati River forms the boundary between the Purulia I and Arsha and Purulia II CD blocks. The upper Kangsabati basin has undulating land and the elevation rises from 200 to 300 m and the general slope is from west to east and south-east.

The Purulia I CD block is bounded by the Chandankiyari CD block, in the Bokaro district of Jharkhand, and Purulia II and Hura CD blocks on the north, the Puncha and Manbazar I CD blocks on the east, the Barabazar CD block on the south, and the Arsha and Joypur CD blocks on the west.

The Purulia I CD block has an area of 281.50 km^{2}. It has 1 panchayat samity, 8 gram panchayats, 101 gram sansads (village councils), 115 mouzas, 105 inhabited villages and 1 census town. Kenda (partly), Purulia (Town) (partly), Arsha (partly) and Purulia (Muffasil) (partly) police stations serve this block. Headquarters of this CD Block is at Chakda, PO Kotlui.

Gram panchayats of the Purulia I block/ panchayat samiti are: Bhandarpuara-Chipida, Chakaltor, Dimdiha, Durku, Garafusra, Lagda, Manara and Sonajuri.

== Demographics ==
=== Population ===
According to the 2011 Census of India the Purulia I CD block had a total population of 151,188, of which 145,494 were rural and 5,694 were urban. There were 77,858 (51%) males and 73,330 (49%) females. There were 21,984 persons in the age range of 0 to 6 years. The Scheduled Castes numbered 25,936 (17.15%) and the Scheduled Tribes numbered 12,655 (8.37%).

According to the 2001 census, Purulia I block had a total population of 125,261, out of which 64,980 were males and 60,281 were females. The Purulia I block registered a population growth of 14.34 per cent during the 1991-2001 decade. Decadal growth for the Purulia district was 13.96 per cent. Decadal growth in West Bengal was 17.84 per cent.

Census towns in the Purulia I CD block are (2011 census figures in brackets): Lagda (5,694).

Large villages (with 4,000+ population) in the Purulia I CD block are (2011 census figures in brackets): Garaphushara (4,244), Dimdiha (4,266) and Chakaltor (4,461).

Other villages in the Purulia I CD block are (2011 census figures in brackets): Kotloi (3,151), Chakda (3,275), Durku (2,315) and Bhandarpuara (2,490).

=== Literacy ===
According to the 2011 census the total number of literate persons in Purulia I CD block was 83,688 (64.77% of the population over 6 years) out of which males numbered 52,095 (78.37% of the male population over 6 years) and females numbered 31,593 (50.37%) of the female population over 6 years). The gender disparity (the difference between female and male literacy rates) was 28.00%.

See also – List of West Bengal districts ranked by literacy rate

Literacy in CD blocks of
Purulia district
Purulia Sadar subdivision
Arsha – 57.48%
Balarampur – 60.40%
Hura – 68.79%
Purulia I – 78.37%
Purulia II – 63.39%
Manbazar subdivision
Barabazar – 63.27
Bandwan – 61.38%
Manbazar I – 63.78%
Manbazar II – 60.27%
Puncha – 68.14%
Jhalda subdivision
Baghmundi – 57.17%
Jhalda I – 66.18%
Jhalda II – 54.76%
Joypur – 57.94%
Raghunathpur subdivision
Para – 65.62%
Raghunathpur I – 67.36%
Raghunathpur II – 67.29%
Neturia – 65.14%
Santuri – 64.15%
Kashipur – 71.06%
2011 Census: CD Block Wise

Primary Census Abstract Data

=== Language and religion ===
Religion in Purulia I CD block (2011)
Hinduism	83.87%
Other (tribal religion)	7.81%
Islam	7.11%
Christianity	0.80%
Other or not stated	0.41%

In the 2011 census Hindus numbered 126,796 and formed 83.87% of the population in the Purulia I CD block. Muslims numbered 10,745 and formed 7.11% of the population. Christians numbered 1,206 and formed 0.80% of the population. Others numbered 12,441 and formed 8.23% of the population. Others include Addi Bassi, Marang Boro, Santal, Saranath, Sari Dharma, Sarna, Alchchi, Bidin, Sant, Saevdharm, Seran, Saran, Sarin, Kheria, and other religious communities. In 2001, Hindus were 91.04%, Muslims 6.69%, Christians 0.68% and tribal religions 1.40% of the population respectively.

Languages of Purulia I CD block (2011)
1. Bengali (88.2%)
2. Kurmali (7.55%)
3. Santali (2.86%)
4. Others (1.38%)

At the time of the 2011 census, 88.21% of the population spoke Bengali, 7.55% Kurmali and 2.86% Santali as their first language.

== Rural Poverty ==
According to the Rural Household Survey in 2005, 32.85% of total number of families were BPL families in Purulia district. According to a World Bank report, as of 2012, 31-38% of the population in Purulia, Murshidabad and Uttar Dinajpur districts were below poverty level, the highest among the districts of West Bengal, which had an average 20% of the population below poverty line.

== Economy ==
=== Livelihood ===
Livelihood
in Purulia I CD block
1. Cultivators (21.0%)
2. Agricultural labourers (39.3%)
3. Household industries (3.61%)
4. Other Workers (36.0%)

In the Purulia I CD block in 2011, among the class of total workers, cultivators numbered 12,935 and formed 21.04%, agricultural labourers numbered 24,156 and formed 39.30%, household industry workers numbered 2,216 and formed 3.61% and other workers numbered 22,163 and formed 36.05%. Total workers numbered 61,470 and formed 40.66% of the total population, and non-workers numbered 89,718 and formed 59.34% of the population.

Note: In the census records a person is considered a cultivator, if the person is engaged in cultivation/ supervision of land owned by self/government/institution. When a person who works on another person's land for wages in cash or kind or share, is regarded as an agricultural labourer. Household industry is defined as an industry conducted by one or more members of the family within the household or village, and one that does not qualify for registration as a factory under the Factories Act. Other workers are persons engaged in some economic activity other than cultivators, agricultural labourers and household workers. It includes factory, mining, plantation, transport and office workers, those engaged in business and commerce, teachers, entertainment artistes and so on.

=== Infrastructure ===
There are 105 inhabited villages in the Purulia I CD block, as per the District Census Handbook, Puruliya, 2011. 100% villages have power supply. 105 villages (100%) have drinking water supply. 30 villages (28.57%) have post offices. 88 villages (83.81%) have telephones (including landlines, public call offices and mobile phones). 20 villages (19.05%) have pucca (paved) approach roads and 35 villages (33.33%) have transport communication (includes bus service, rail facility and navigable waterways). 5 villages (4.76%) have agricultural credit societies and 6 villages (5.71%) have banks.

=== Agriculture ===
In 2013-14, persons engaged in agriculture in the Purulia I CD block could be classified as follows: bargadars 1.54%, patta (document) holders 8.83%, small farmers (possessing land between 1 and 2 hectares) 2,55%, marginal farmers (possessing land up to 1 hectare) 27.67% and agricultural labourers 59.40%.

In 2013-14, the total area irrigated in the Purulia I CD block was 5,557.38 hectares, out of which 170.00 hectares by canal water, 4,606.47 hectares by tank water, 27.91 hectares by river lift irrigation, 179.00 hectares by open dug wells and 574 hectares by other means.

In 2013-14, the Purulia I CD block produced 90,165 tonnes of Aman paddy, the main winter crop, from 34,693 hectares, 20 tonnes of wheat from 9 hectares, 331 tonnes of maize from 240 hectares and 6,813 tonnes of potatoes from 298 hectares. It also produced maskalai, khesari, gram, mustard and sugar cane.

=== Banking ===
In 2013-14, the Purulia I CD block had offices of 1 commercial bank and 5 gramin banks.

=== Backward Regions Grant Fund ===
The Purulia district is listed as a backward region and receives financial support from the Backward Regions Grant Fund. The fund, created by the Government of India, is designed to redress regional imbalances in development. As of 2012, 272 districts across the country were listed under this scheme. The list includes 11 districts of West Bengal.

== Transport ==
In 2013-14, the Purulia I CD Block had 4 originating/ terminating bus routes.

SH 4A running from Tulin (in the Purulia district) terminates at its junction with the NH 18 at Chas Morh.

The Purulia-Kotshila branch line of the South Eastern Railway passes through this CD block and there are stations at Gourinathdham and Chas Road.

== Education ==
In 2013-14, the Purulia I CD Block had 142 primary schools with 14,913 students, 20 middle schools with 776 students, 8 high schools with 3,010 students and 14 higher secondary schools with 16,111 students. The Purulia I CD block had 1 professional/ technical institutes with 95 students and 225 institutions with 10,461 students for special and non-formal education. Purulia city (outside the CD block) had a university, 2 general colleges and 5 professional/ technical institutions.

See also – Education in India

According to the 2011 census, in Purulia I CD block, amongst the 106 inhabited villages, 3 villages did not have a school, 31 villages had two or more primary schools, 32 villages had at least 1 primary and 1 middle school and 21 villages had at least 1 middle and 1 secondary school.

== Healthcare ==
In 2014, the Purulia I CD block had 1 block primary health centre, 1 primary health centre and 1 private nursing home, with total 198 beds and 6 doctors. 7,795 patients were treated indoor and 271,956 patients were treated outdoor in the hospitals, health centres and subcentres of the CD block.

Chakaltor Rural Hospital, with 30 beds at Chakaltor, is the major government medical facility in the Purulia I CD block. There are primary health centres at Pichasi (with 10 beds), Belkuri (with 2 beds ) and Lagda (with 6 beds).
