= Sudip Kumar Mukherjee =

Indian politician

Member of the West Bengal Legislative Assembly
- In office 2016–Incumbent
- Preceded by: Sudip Kumar Mukherjee (representing INC)
- Constituency: Purulia

Personal details
- Party: Bharatiya Janata Party

Sudip Kumar Mukherjee is an Indian politician from Bharatiya Janata Party. In May 2021, he was elected as a member of the West Bengal Legislative Assembly from Purulia (constituency). He defeated Sujoy Banerjee of All India Trinamool Congress by 6,585 votes in 2021 West Bengal Assembly election. Mukherjee's father's name is Late Shyama Prasad Mukherjee.
