= Balarampur, Purulia (community development block) =

Balarampur
- Community development block
- Coordinates: 23°05′48″N 86°13′05″E
- Country: India
- State: West Bengal
- District: Purulia
- Parliamentary constituency: Purulia
- Assembly constituency: Baghmundi

Area
  - Total: 300.88 km^{2} (116.17 sq mi)

Population (2011)
  - Total: 137,950
  - Density: 407/km^{2} (1,050/sq mi)

Languages
  - Official: Bengali, Santali, English
- Time zone: UTC+5.30 (IST)
- Telephone/STD code: 03254
- Vehicle registration: WB-55, WB-56
- Literacy Rate: 60.40%
- Website: http://purulia.gov.in/

Balarampur is a community development block (CD block) that forms an administrative division in the Purulia Sadar subdivision of the Purulia district in the Indian state of West Bengal.

== History ==
=== Background ===
The Jaina Bhagavati-Sutra of the 5th century AD mentions that Purulia was one of the sixteen mahajanapadas and was a part of the kingdom known as Vajra-bhumi in ancient times. In 1833, the Manbhum district was carved out of the Jungle Mahals district, with headquarters at Manbazar. In 1838, the headquarters was transferred to Purulia. After independence, when Manbhum district was a part of Bihar, efforts were made to impose Hindi on the Bengali-speaking majority of the district and it led to the Bengali Language Movement (Manbhum). In 1956, the Manbhum district was partitioned between Bihar and West Bengal under the States Reorganization Act and the Bihar and West Bengal (Transfer of Territories) Act 1956.

=== Red corridor ===
106 districts spanning 10 states across India, described as being part of the left wing extremism activities, constitutes the Red corridor. In West Bengal the districts of the Paschim Medinipur, Bankura, Purulia and Birbhum are part of the Red corridor. However, as of July 2016, there had been no reported incidents of Maoist related activities from these districts for the previous 4 years.

The CPI (Maoist) extremism affected CD blocks in the Purulia district were: Jhalda I, Jhalda II, Arsha, Baghmundi, Balarampur, Barabazar, Manbazar II and Bandwan. Certain reports also included Manbazar I and Joypur CD Blocks and some times indicted the whole of Purulia district.

The Lalgarh movement, which started attracting attention after the failed assassination attempt on Buddhadeb Bhattacharjee, then chief minister of West Bengal, in the Salboni area of the Paschim Medinipur district, on 2 November 2008 and the police action that followed, had also spread over to these areas. The movement was not just a political struggle but an armed struggle that concurrently took the look of a social struggle. A large number of CPI (M) activists were killed. Although the epi-centre of the movement was Lalgarh, it was spread across 19 police stations in three adjoining districts – Paschim Medinipur, Bankura and Purulia, all thickly forested and near the border with Jharkhand. The deployment of CRPF and other forces started on 11 June 2009. The movement came to an end after the 2011 state assembly elections and change of government in West Bengal. The death of Kishenji, the Maoist commander, on 24 November 2011 was the last major landmark.

== Geography ==
CD blocks in Purulia district

Tentlo, a constituent panchayat of Balarampur block, is located at 23°05′48″N 86°13′05″E.

The Balarampur CD block is located in the southern part of the district. The Bagmundi-Bandwan uplands is an area that has descended from the Ranchi Plateau. In the Baghmundi and Balarampur areas, the Ajodhya Hills form the main highlands, forming the drainage divide between the basins of the Subrnarekha and the Kangsabati. The elevation ranges from 475 to 700 m.

The Balarampur CD block is bounded by the Arsha CD block on the north, the Barabazar CD block on the east and on the south, the Nimdih CD block, in the Seraikela Kharsawan district of Jharkhand and the Baghmundi CD block on the west.

The Balarampur CD block has an area of 300.88 km^{2}. It has 1 panchayat samity, 7 gram panchayats, 92 gram sansads (village councils), 90 mouzas, 89 inhabited villages and 1 census town. Balarampur police station serves this block. Headquarters of this CD block is at Baghadih.

Gram panchayats of the Balarampur block/panchayat samiti are: Balarampur, Bara-Urma, Bela, Darda, Genrua, Ghatbera-Kerowa and Tentlo.

== Demographics ==
=== Population ===
According to the 2011 Census of India the Balarampur CD block had a total population of 137,950, of which 113,519 were rural and 24,431 were urban. There were 70,995 (51%) males and 66,955 (49%) females. There were 20,118 persons in the age range of 0 to 6 years. The Scheduled Castes numbered 16,427 (11.91%) and the Scheduled Tribes numbered 43,738 (31.71%).

According to the 2001 census, the Balarampur CD block had a total population of 118,071, out of which 60,424 were males and 57,647 were females. The Balarampur CD block registered a population growth of 14.27 per cent during the 1991-2001 decade. Decadal growth for the Purulia district was 13.96 per cent. Decadal growth in West Bengal was 17.84 per cent.

Census Towns in the Balarampur CD block are (2011 census figures in brackets): Balarampur (24,431).

Large villages (with 4,000+ population) in the Balarampur CD block are (2011 census figures in brackets): Genrua (6,454).

Other villages in the Balarampur CD block are (2011 census figures in brackets): Bela (3,436), Darda (2,619), Tentlo (2,924), Ghatbera (1,858) and Keraya (2,140).

=== Literacy ===
According to the 2011 census the total number of literate persons in the Balarampur CD block was 71,176 (60.40% of the population over 6 years) out of which males numbered 44,950 (74.18% of the male population over 6 years) and females numbered 26,226 (45.82%) of the female population over 6 years). The gender disparity (the difference between female and male literacy rates) was 28.35%.

Literacy in CD blocks of
Purulia district
Purulia Sadar subdivision
Arsha – 57.48%
Balarampur – 60.40%
Hura – 68.79%
Purulia I – 78.37%
Purulia II – 63.39%
Manbazar subdivision
Barabazar – 63.27
Bandwan – 61.38%
Manbazar I – 63.78%
Manbazar II – 60.27%
Puncha – 68.14%
Jhalda subdivision
Baghmundi – 57.17%
Jhalda I – 66.18%
Jhalda II – 54.76%
Joypur – 57.94%
Raghunathpur subdivision
Para – 65.62%
Raghunathpur I – 67.36%
Raghunathpur II – 67.29%
Neturia – 65.14%
Santuri – 64.15%
Kashipur – 71.06%
2011 Census: CD Block Wise

Primary Census Abstract Data

See also – List of West Bengal districts ranked by literacy rate

=== Language and religion ===
Religion in Balrampur CD block (2011)
Hinduism	78.89%
Other (tribal religion)	14.72%
Islam	5.77%
Christianity	0.47%
Other or not stated	0.15%

In the 2011 census Hindus numbered 108,829 and formed 78.89% of the population in the Balarampur CD block. Muslims numbered 7,966 and formed 5.77% of the population. Christians numbered 648 and formed 0.47% of the population. Others numbered 20,507 and formed 14.87% of the population. Others include Addi Bassi, Marang Boro, Santal, Saranath, Sari Dharma, Sarna, Alchchi, Bidin, Sant, Saevdharm, Seran, Saran, Sarin, Kheria, and other religious communities. In 2001, Hindus were 81.85%, Muslims 5.44% and tribal religions 12.14% of the population respectively.

Languages of Balrampur CD block (2011)
1. Bengali (77.0%)
2. Santali (18.9%)
3. Hindi (3.58%)
4. Others (0.50%)

At the time of the 2011 census, 77.03% of the population spoke Bengali, 18.89% Santali and 3.58% Hindi as their first language.

== Rural Poverty ==
According to the Rural Household Survey in 2005, 32.85% of total number of families were BPL families in Purulia district. According to a World Bank report, as of 2012, 31-38% of the population in Purulia, Murshidabad and Uttar Dinajpur districts were below poverty level, the highest among the districts of West Bengal, which had an average 20% of the population below poverty line.

== Economy ==
=== Livelihood ===
Livelihood
in Balarampur CD block
1. Cultivators (21.8%)
2. Agricultural labourers (31.7%)
3. Household industries (2.68%)
4. Other Workers (37.8%)

In the Balarampur CD block in 2011, among the class of total workers, cultivators numbered 12,333 and formed 21.76%, agricultural labourers numbered 21,384 and formed 31.73%, household industry workers numbered 1,517 and formed 2.68% and other workers numbered 21,441 and formed 37.83%. Total workers numbered 56,675 and formed 41.08% of the total population, and non-workers numbered 81,275 and formed 58.92% of the population.

Note: In the census records a person is considered a cultivator, if the person is engaged in cultivation/ supervision of land owned by self/government/institution. When a person who works on another person's land for wages in cash or kind or share, is regarded as an agricultural labourer. Household industry is defined as an industry conducted by one or more members of the family within the household or village, and one that does not qualify for registration as a factory under the Factories Act. Other workers are persons engaged in some economic activity other than cultivators, agricultural labourers and household workers. It includes factory, mining, plantation, transport and office workers, those engaged in business and commerce, teachers, entertainment artistes and so on.

=== Infrastructure ===
There are 89 inhabited villages in the Balarampur CD block, as per the District Census Handbook, Puruliya, 2011. 87 villages (97.95%) have power supply. 89 villages (100%) have drinking water supply. 14 villages (15.73%) have post offices. 78 villages (87.64%) have telephones (including landlines, public call offices and mobile phones). 22 villages (24.72%) have pucca (paved) approach roads and 24 villages (26.97%) have transport communication (includes bus service, rail facility and navigable waterways). 6 villages (6.74%) have agricultural credit societies and 4 villages (4.49%) have banks.

=== Agriculture ===
In 2013–14, persons engaged in agriculture in the Balarampur CD block could be classified as follows: bargadars 0.71%, patta (document) holders 17.62%, small farmers (possessing land between 1 and 2 hectares) 6.65%, marginal farmers (possessing land up to 1 hectare) 24.10% and agricultural labourers 50.92%.

In 2013–14, the total area irrigated in the Balarampur CD block was 7,591.73 hectares, out of which 3,393.61 hectares was by canal irrigation, 3,736.67 hectares by tank water, 61.57 hectares by river lift irrigation, 99.80 hectares by open dug wells and 300.00 hectares by other means.

In 2013–14, the Balarampur CD block produced 74,401 tonnes of Aman paddy, the main winter crop, from 30,034 hectares, 334 tonnes of Boro paddy, the spring crop, from 113 hectares, 299 tonnes of wheat from 125 hectares, 373 tonnes of maize from 133 hectares and 1,475 tonnes of potato from 75 hectares. It also produced maskalai, mustard and til.

=== Banking ===
In 2013–14, the Balarampur CD block had offices of 6 commercial banks and 1 gramin bank.

=== Backward Regions Grant Fund ===
The Purulia district is listed as a backward region and receives financial support from the Backward Regions Grant Fund. The fund, created by the Government of India, is designed to redress regional imbalances in development. As of 2012, 272 districts across the country were listed under this scheme. The list includes 11 districts of West Bengal.

== Transport ==
In 2013–14, the Balarampur CD block had 4 originating/ terminating bus routes.

The National Highway 18 running from its crossing with the NH 19 at Govindpur, Dhanbad district, Jharkhand to Balshwar, Odisha, crosses the State Highway 4 running from Jhalda (in the Purulia district) to Junput (in the Purba Medinipur district) at Balarampur.

The Adra-Chandil section of the Asansol-Tatanagar-Kharagpur line of the South Eastern Railway passes through this CD block and there are stations at Barabhum and Biramdih.

== Education ==
In 2013–14, the Balarampur CD block had 126 primary schools with 13,537 students, 20 middle schools with 934 students and 10 higher secondary schools with 13,938 students. The Balarampur CD block had 1 general college with 1,862 students and 377 institutions with 7,860 students for special and non-formal education.

See also – Education in India

According to the 2011 census, in Balarampur CD block, amongst the 89 inhabited villages, 5 villages did not have a school, 36 villages had two or more primary schools, 35 villages had at least 1 primary and 1 middle school and 8 villages had at least 1 middle and 1 secondary school.

Balarampur College was established at Rangadih in 1985.

== Healthcare ==
In 2014, the Balarampur CD block had 1 rural hospital, 3 primary health centres and 1 private nursing home, with total 67 beds and 8 doctors. 10,255 patients were treated indoor and 250,414 patients were treated outdoor in the hospitals, health centres and subcentres of the CD Block.

Bansgarh Rural Hospital, with 30 beds at Rangadih, is the major government facility in the Balarampur CD block. There are primary health centres at Kerwa (with 10 beds), Nekray (with 6 beds) and Malti (with 6 beds). Gandhi Memorial Hospital at Bansgarh, with 15 beds, is run by a NGO.
