= Purulia II =

- Community development block
- Interactive map of Purulia II
- Coordinates: 23.4300165°N 86.3770866°E
- Country: India
- State: West Bengal
- District: Purulia

Government
  - Type: Community development block

Area
  - Total: 310.10 km^{2} (119.73 sq mi)
- Elevation: 240 m (790 ft)

Population (2011)
  - Total: 169,488
  - Density: 546.56/km^{2} (1,415.6/sq mi)

Languages
  - Official: Bengali, English
- Time zone: UTC+5:30 (IST)
- PIN: 723147 (Vivekananda Nagar); 723148 (Hutmura); 723163 (Chharra)
- Telephone/STD code: 03254
- ISO 3166 code: IN-WB
- Vehicle registration: WB-55, WB-56
- Literacy: 63.39%
- Lok Sabha constituency: Purulia
- Vidhan Sabha constituency: Purulia
- Website: purulia.gov.in

Purulia II is a community development block (CD block) that forms an administrative division in the Purulia Sadar subdivision of the Purulia district in the Indian state of West Bengal.

== History ==
=== Background ===
The Jaina Bhagavati-Sutra of the 5th century AD mentions that Purulia was one of the sixteen mahajanapadas and was a part of the kingdom known as Vajra-bhumi in ancient times. In 1833, the Manbhum district was carved out of the Jungle Mahals district, with the headquarters at Manbazar. In 1838, the headquarters was transferred to Purulia. After independence, when Manbhum district was a part of Bihar, efforts were made to impose Hindi on the Bengali-speaking majority of the district and it led to the Bengali Language Movement (Manbhum). In 1956, the Manbhum district was partitioned between Bihar and West Bengal under the States Reorganization Act and the Bihar and West Bengal (Transfer of Territories) Act 1956.

== Geography ==
CD blocks in Purulia district

Golamara, a constituent panchayat of Purulia II block, is located at 23°25′48″N 86°22′38″E.

The Purulia II CD block is located in the central part of the district. The Kangsabati River forms the boundary between the Purulia II and Purulia I CD blocks. The upper Kangsabati basin has undulating land and the elevation rises from 200 to 300 m and the general slope is from west to east and south-east.

The Purulia II CD block is bounded by the Para CD block, on the north, the Hura CD block, on the east, the Purulia I CD block on the south and a part of the west and the Chandankiyari CD block, in the Bokaro district of Jharkhand, on the west.

The Purulia II CD block has an area of 310.10 km^{2}. It has 1 panchayat samity, 9 gram panchayats, 114 gram sansads (village councils), 116 mouzas, 101 inhabited villages and 2 census towns. Purulia (Muffasil) (partly) and Purulia (Town) (partly) police stations serve this block. Headquarters of this CD Block is at Village – Bongabari, PO – Vivekanandanagar.

Gram panchayats of the Purulia II block/panchayat samiti are: Agoya-Narra, Belma, Bhangra, Chhara-Dumdumi, Ghonga, Golamara, Hutmura, Pindra and Raghabpur.

== Demographics ==
=== Population ===
According to the 2011 Census of India, the Purulia II CD block had a total population of 169,488, of which 157,862 were rural and 11,626 were urban. There were 86,462 (51%) males and 83,026 (49%) females. There were 25,437 persons in the age range of 0 to 6 years. The Scheduled Castes numbered 46,039 (27.16%) and the Scheduled Tribes numbered 8,213 (4.85%).

According to the 2001 census, the Purulia II block had a total population of 142,700, out of which 73,407 were males and 69,293 were females. The Purulia II block registered a population growth of 16.50 per cent during the 1991-2001 decade. Decadal growth for the Purulia district was 13.96 per cent. Decadal growth in West Bengal was 17.84 per cent.

Census Towns in the Purulia II CD block are (2011 census figures in brackets): Raghabpur (5,748) and Hutmura (5,878).

Large villages (with 4,000+ population) in the Purulia II CD block are (2011 census figures in brackets): Bongabari (4,215), Sihuli (4,551) and Chharra (6,131).

Other villages in the Purulia II CD block are (2011 census figures in brackets): Pindra (2,512), Bhangra (2,824), Belma (2,773), Dumdumi (3,768), Ghongha (3,803), Golamara (2,954), Hatuara (2,343) and Agoa (471).

=== Literacy ===
According to the 2011 census the total number of literate persons in the Purulia II CD block was 91,314 (63.39% of the population over 6 years) out of which males numbered 56,377 (76.72% of the male population over 6 years) and females numbered 34,937 (49.51%) of the female population over 6 years). The gender disparity (the difference between female and male literacy rates) was 27.21%.

See also – List of West Bengal districts ranked by literacy rate

Literacy in CD blocks of
Purulia district
Purulia Sadar subdivision
Arsha – 57.48%
Balarampur – 60.40%
Hura – 68.79%
Purulia I – 78.37%
Purulia II – 63.39%
Manbazar subdivision
Barabazar – 63.27
Bandwan – 61.38%
Manbazar I – 63.78%
Manbazar II – 60.27%
Puncha – 68.14%
Jhalda subdivision
Baghmundi – 57.17%
Jhalda I – 66.18%
Jhalda II – 54.76%
Joypur – 57.94%
Raghunathpur subdivision
Para – 65.62%
Raghunathpur I – 67.36%
Raghunathpur II – 67.29%
Neturia – 65.14%
Santuri – 64.15%
Kashipur – 71.06%
2011 Census: CD Block Wise

Primary Census Abstract Data

=== Language and religion ===
Religion in Purulia II CD block (2011)
| Hinduism | 83.58% |
| Islam | 15.95% |
| Other or not stated | 0.47% |

In the 2011 census Hindus numbered 141,656 and formed 83.58% of the population in the Purulia II CD block. Muslims numbered 27,027 and formed 15.95% of the population. Others numbered 805 and formed 0.47% of the population. Others include Addi Bassi, Marang Boro, Santal, Saranath, Sari Dharma, Sarna, Alchchi, Bidin, Sant, Saevdharm, Seran, Saran, Sarin, Kheria, and other religious communities. In 2001, Hindus were 84.74%, Muslims 14.09% and tribal religions 1.00% of the population respectively.

Bengali is the predominant language, spoken by 98.89% of the population respectively.

== Rural Poverty ==
According to the Rural Household Survey in 2005, 32.85% of total number of families were BPL families in Purulia district. According to a World Bank report, as of 2012, 31-38% of the population in Purulia, Murshidabad and Uttar Dinajpur districts were below poverty level, the highest among the districts of West Bengal, which had an average 20% of the population below poverty line.

== Economy ==
=== Livelihood ===
Livelihood
in Purulia II CD block
1. Cultivators (17.6%)
2. Agricultural labourers (37.4%)
3. Household industries (5.89%)
4. Other Workers (39.1%)

In the Purulia II CD block in 2011, among the class of total workers, cultivators numbered 12,935 and formed 17.58%, agricultural labourers numbered 26,245 and formed 37.38%, household industry workers numbered 4,137 and formed 5.89% and other workers numbered 27,487 and formed 39.15%. Total workers numbered 70,212 and formed 41.43% of the total population, and non-workers numbered 99,276 and formed 58.56% of the population.

Note: In the census records a person is considered a cultivator, if the person is engaged in cultivation/ supervision of land owned by self/government/institution. When a person who works on another person's land for wages in cash or kind or share, is regarded as an agricultural labourer. Household industry is defined as an industry conducted by one or more members of the family within the household or village, and one that does not qualify for registration as a factory under the Factories Act. Other workers are persons engaged in some economic activity other than cultivators, agricultural labourers and household workers. It includes factory, mining, plantation, transport and office workers, those engaged in business and commerce, teachers, entertainment artistes and so on.

=== Infrastructure ===
There are 101 inhabited villages in the Purulia II CD block, as per the District Census Handbook, Puruliya, 2011. 100% villages have power supply. 95 villages (94.06%) have drinking water supply. 25 villages (24.75%) have post offices. 85 villages (84.16%) have telephones (including landlines, public call offices and mobile phones). 31 villages (30.69%) have pucca (paved) approach roads and 46 villages (45.54%) have transport communication (includes bus service, rail facility and navigable waterways). 4 villages (3.96%) have agricultural credit societies and 8 villages (7.92%) have banks.

=== Agriculture ===
In 2013-14, persons engaged in agriculture in the Purulia II CD block could be classified as follows: bargadars 2.24%, patta (document) holders 7.22%, small farmers (possessing land between 1 and 2 hectares) 3.61%, marginal farmers (possessing land up to 1 hectare) 19.00% and agricultural labourers 67.92%.

In 2013-14, the total area irrigated in the Purulia II CD block was 7,221.37 hectares, out of which 2,378 hectares were by canals, 4,141.91 hectares by tank water, 49.66 hectares by river lift irrigation, 186.80 hectares by open dug wells and 465.00 hectares by other means.

In 2013-14, the Purulia II CD block produced 2,668 tonnes of Aman paddy, the main winter crop from 1,795 hectares. It also produced wheat, maskalai, mustard and potatoes.

=== Banking ===
In 2013-14, the Purulia II CD block had offices of 8 commercial banks and 1 gramin bank.

=== Backward Regions Grant Fund ===
The Purulia district is listed as a backward region and receives financial support from the Backward Regions Grant Fund. The fund, created by the Government of India, is designed to redress regional imbalances in development. As of 2012, 272 districts across the country were listed under this scheme. The list includes 11 districts of West Bengal.

== Transport ==
In 2013-14, the Purulia II CD block had 6 originating/ terminating bus routes.

The State Highway 5 running from Rupnarayanpur (in the Paschim Bardhaman district) to Junput (in the Purba Medinipur district) passes through this CD block.

The Adra-Chandil section of the Asansol-Tatanagar-Kharagpur line of the South Eastern Railway passes through this CD block and there is a station at Charra.

== Education ==
In 2013-14, the Purulia II CD block had 149 primary schools with 18,147 students, 23 middle schools with 1,588 students, 7 high schools with 3,534 students and 17 higher secondary schools with 18,024 students. The Purulia II CD block had 2 professional/ technical institutions with 977 students and 225 institutions with 10,461 students for special and non-formal education. Purulia city (outside the CD block) had a university, 2 general colleges and 5 professional/ technical institutions.

See also – Education in India

According to the 2011 census, in Purulia II CD block, amongst the 101 inhabited villages, 2 villages did not have a school, 47 villages had two or more primary schools, 23 villages had at least 1 primary and 1 middle school and 15 villages had at least 1 middle and 1 secondary school.

== Healthcare ==
In 2014, the Purulia II CD block had 1 block primary health centre, 3 primary health centres and 1 private nursing home with total 40 beds and 4 doctors. 3,791 patients were treated indoor and 203,229 patients were treated outdoor in the health centres and subcentres of the CD Block.

Kushtor Rural Hospital, with 30 beds at Kustor, is the major government medical facility in the Purulia II CD block. There are primary health centres at Hutmura (with 10 beds) and Chayanpur (with 6 beds).
