= Purulia Sadar subdivision =

- Subdivision
- Interactive map of Purulia Sadar subdivision
- Coordinates: 23.19°N 86.22°E
- Country: India
- State: West Bengal
- District: Purulia
- Headquarters: Purulia

Area
  - Total: 1,474.81 km^{2} (569.43 sq mi)

Population (2011)
  - Total: 878,373
  - Density: 595.584/km^{2} (1,542.56/sq mi)

Languages
  - Official: Bengali, English
- Time zone: UTC+5:30 (IST)
- ISO 3166 code: IN-WB
- Vehicle registration: WB
- Website: http://purulia.gov.in/

Purulia Sadar subdivision is a subdivision of the Purulia district in the state of West Bengal, India.

== History ==
Purulia district was divided into four subdivisions, viz., Purulia Sadar, Manbazar, Jhalda and Raghunathpur, with effect from 6 April 2017, as per Order No. 100-AR/P/2R-2/1999 dated 30 March 2017 issued by the Government of West Bengal, in the Kolkata Gazette dated 30 March 2017.

== Subdivisions ==
Purulia district is divided into the following administrative subdivisions:

Subdivision	Headquarter	Area km^{2}	Population (2011)	Rural Population % (2011)	Urban Population % (2011)
Purulia Sadar	Purulia	1,474.81	878,373	81.42	18.58
Manbazar	Manbazar	1,766.55	640,588	96.32	3.68
Jhalda	Jhalda	1,233.97	573,771	91.02	8.98
Raghunathpur	Raghunathpur	1,733.01	838,128	83.80	16.20
Purulia district	Purulia	6208.34	2,930,860	87.24	12.76

Note: The 2011 census data has been recast as per reorganisation of the subdivisions. There may be minor variations.

Places in Purulia Sadar subdivision in Purulia district
M: municipality, CT: census town, R: rural/ urban centre, H: historical/ religious centre, F: facility
Owing to space constraints in the small map, the actual locations in a larger map may vary slightly

== Police stations ==
Police stations in the Purulia Sadar subdivision have the following features and jurisdiction:

Police Station	Area covered km^{2}	Inter-state border km	Municipal Town	CD block
Arsha	187.5	-	-	Arsha
Hura	382.21	-	-	Hura
Purulia (Town)	13.9	-	Purulia	Purulia I, Purulia II
Purulia (Muffasil)	534.47	-	-	Purulia I, Purulia II
Purulia Sadar Women	-	-	Purulia, Jhalda	Purulia (Muffasil), Kotshila, Arsha, Jhalda, Jaypur police stations area
Balarampur	299.5	12.39	-	Balarampur

== Blocks ==
Community development blocks in Purulia Sadar subdivision are:

CD block	Headquarters	Area km^{2}	Population (2011)	SC %	ST %	Literacy rate %	Census Towns
Arsha	Sirkabad	375.04	154,736	11.82	21.69	54.78	
Balarampur	Baghadih	300.88	137.950	11.91	31.71	60.40	1
Hura	Hura	382.21	143,575	19.56	25.46	68.79	
Purulia I	Chakda, PO Kotlui	281.50	151,188	17.15	8.37	78.37	1
Purulia II	Bongabari, PO Vivekanandanagar	310.10	169,488	27.16	4.85	63.39	2

== Gram panchayats ==
Gram panchayats in Purulia Sadar subdivision are :

- Arsha: Arsha, Chatuhansa, Hensla, Puara, Beldih, Hetgugui, Mankiary and Sirkabad.
- Balarampur block: Balarampur, Bela, Genrua, Tentlow, Baraurma, Darda and Ghatbera–Kerowa.
- Hura block: Chatumadar, Jabarrah, Ladhurka, Rakhera–Bispuria, Daldali, Kalabani, Lakhanpur, Hura, Keshergarh and Maguria–Lalpur.
- Purulia–I block: Bhandarpuara–Chipida, Dimdiha, Lagda, Durku, Manara, Chakaltore, Garafusra and Sonaijuri.
- Purulia–II block: Agoya–Narra, Chharradumdumi, Hutmura, Belma, Ghonga, Pindra, Bhangra, Golamara and Raghabpur.

== Education ==
Given in the table below is a comprehensive picture of the education scenario in Purulia district, after reorganisation of the district in 2017, with data for the year 2013-14. (There may be minor variations because of data recasting).:

Subdivision	Primary School		Middle School		High School		Higher Secondary School		General College, Univ		Technical / Professional Instt		Non-formal Education	
Subdivision	Institution	Student	Institution	Student	Institution	Student	Institution	Student	Institution	Student	Institution	Student	Institution	Student
Purulia Sadar	818	87,425	114	7,292	26	11,345	83	80,138	6	12,463	11	1,806	1,461	49,234
Manbazar	832	59,105	121	4,141	21	7,615	64	63,466	5	5,441	3	256	1,371	41,267
Jhalda	533	53,629	67	3,453	2	1,415	47	55,492	6	2,332	2	98	836	34,779
Raghunathpur	818	72,073	126	8,925	31	16,055	67	68,188	4	7,007	5	649	1,761	45,472
Purulia district	3,001	272,232	428	23,811	80	36,430	261	267,284	21	27,243	21	3.009	5,429	170,752

Note: Primary schools include junior basic schools; middle schools, high schools and higher secondary schools include madrasahs; technical schools include junior technical schools, junior government polytechnics, industrial technical institutes, industrial training centres, nursing training institutes etc.; technical and professional colleges include engineering colleges, medical colleges, para-medical institutes, management colleges, teachers training and nursing training colleges, law colleges, art colleges, music colleges etc. Special and non-formal education centres include sishu siksha kendras, madhyamik siksha kendras, centres of Rabindra mukta vidyalaya, recognised Sanskrit tols, institutions for the blind and other handicapped persons, Anganwadi centres, reformatory schools etc.

=== Educational institutions ===
The following institutions are located in Purulia Sadar subdivision:

- Sidho Kanho Birsha University was established in 2010 at Purulia.
- Purulia Government Medical College & Hospital is located at Hatuara, Purulia.
- Jagannath Kishore College was established at Purulia in 1948.
- Nistarini Women's College was established in 1957 at Purulia.
- Arsha College was established at Arsha in 2009.
- Balarampur College was established at Rangadih, Balarampur in 1985.
- Mahatma Gandhi College was established at Daldali, Lalpur in 1981.

== Healthcare ==
The table below (all data in numbers) presents an overview of the medical facilities available and patients treated in the hospitals, health centres and sub-centres in 2014 in Purulia district, after reorganisation of the district in 2017, with data for the year 2013-14. (There may be minor variations because of data recasting).:

Subdivision	Health & Family Welfare Deptt, WB				Other State Govt Deptts	Local bodies	Central Govt Deptts / PSUs	NGO / Private Nursing Homes	Total	Total Number of Beds	Total Number of Doctors*	Indoor Patients	Outdoor Patients
Subdivision	Hospitals	Rural Hospitals	Block Primary Health Centres	Primary Health Centres	Other State Govt Deptts	Local bodies	Central Govt Deptts / PSUs	NGO / Private Nursing Homes	Total	Total Number of Beds	Total Number of Doctors*	Indoor Patients	Outdoor Patients
Purulia Sadar	2	2	3	13	2	-	-	9	31	1,203	96	209,390	1,626,712
Manbazar	-	1	4	14	-	-	-	-	19	254	40	35,184	990,561
Jhalda	-	1	3	10	-	-	-	-	15	196	23	28,522	820,961
Raghunathpur	1	1	4	13	-	-	1	2	22	835	77	55,866	1,071,786
Purulia district	3	5	14	50	2	-	1	12	87	2,488	236	328,962	4,510,020

.* Excluding nursing homes.

=== Medical facilities ===
Medical facilities in Purulia Sadar subdivision are as follows:

Hospitals: (Name, location, beds)

- Deben Mahato Hospital (District Hospital), Purulia M, 506 beds
- Purulia Jail Hospital, Purulia M, 33 beds
- Purulia Police Hospital, Purulia M, 20 beds
- Purulia Mental Hospital, Purulia M, 200 beds

Rural Hospitals: (Name, CD block, location, beds)

- Chakaltore Rural Hospital, Purulia I CD block, Chakaltor, 30 beds
- Kushtor Rural Hospital, Purulia II CD block, Kustor, 30 beds
- Hura Rural Hospital, Hura CD block, Hura, 30 beds
- Bansgarh Rural Hospital, Balarampur CD block, Rangadih, 30 beds
- Sirkabad Rural Hospital, Arsha CD block, Sirkabad, 30 beds

Primary Health Centres : (CD block-wise)(CD block, PHC location, beds)

- Purulia I CD block: Pichasi (10), Belkuri (2), Lagda (6)
- Purulia II CD block: Hutmura (10), Chayanpur (6)
- Arsha CD block: Kantadih (4), Arsha (10)
- Balarampur CD block: Kerwa (10), Nekray (6), Malti (6)
- Hura CD block: Chatumadar (4), Khairipihira (4), Ladurkha (10)

== Electoral constituencies ==
Lok Sabha (parliamentary) and Vidhan Sabha (state assembly) constituencies in Purulia district were as follows:

Lok Sabha constituency	Vidhan Sabha constituency	Reservation	CD Block and/or Gram panchayat
Purulia	Balarampur	None	Balarampur CD Block; Chakaltore, Dimdiha, Durku, Garafusra, Lagda and Sonaijuri gram panchayats of Purulia I CD Block; and Chatu Hansa, Hensla and Puara gram panchayats of Arsha CD Block.
	Baghmundi	None	Jhalda municipality; Jhalda I and Baghmundi CD Blocks; Hetgugui and Sirkabad gram panchayats of Arsha CD Block.
	Joypur	None	Joypur and Jhalda II CD Blocks; Arsha, Beldih and Manikary gram panchayats of Arsha CD Block.
	Purulia	None	Purulia municipality; Purulia II CD Block; Bhandar Purachipida and Manara gram panchayats of Purulia I CD Block.
	Manbazar	ST	Manbazar I and Puncha CD Blocks; Chatumadar, Daldali and Manguria Lalpur gram panchayats of Hura CD Block.
	Kashipur	None	Kashipur CD Block; Hura, Jabarrah, Kalabani, Keshargarh, Ladhurka, Lakhanpur and Rakhera Bishpuri gram panchayats of Hura CD Block.
	Para	SC	Para and Raghunathpur II CD Blocks.
Bankura	Raghunathpur	SC	Raghunathpur municipality; Raghunathpur I, Neturia and Santuri CD Blocks.
	Other assembly segments in Bankura district		
Jhargram (ST)	Bandwan	ST	Bandwan, Barabazar and Manbazar II CD Blocks.
	Other assembly segments in Paschim Medinipur district		
