= Telkupi =

Submerged location in West Bengal, India

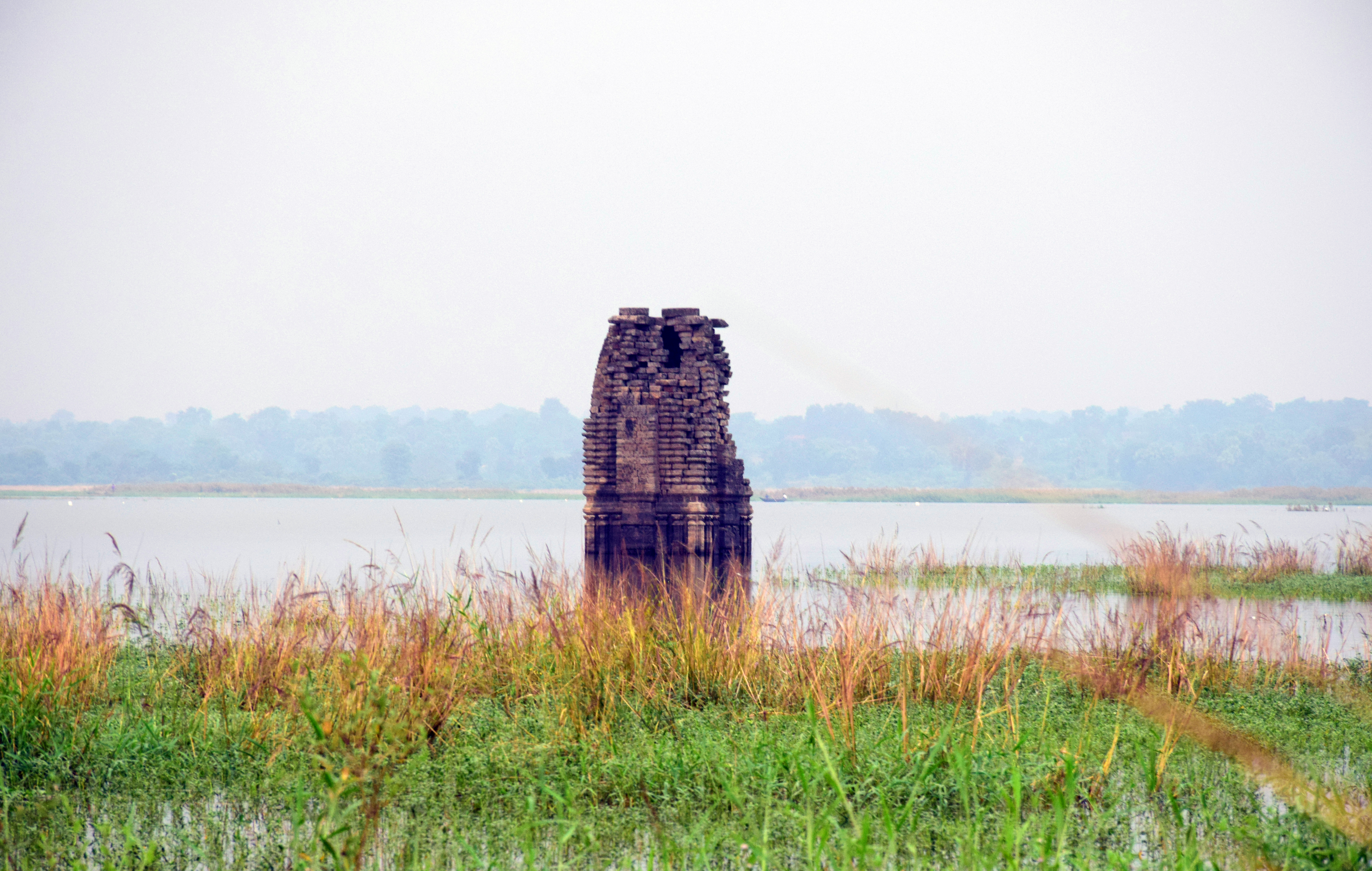
- A submerged deul at Telkupi

- Location within West Bengal Location within India
- 23.666362°N 86.606561°E
- Type: Ancient settlement
- Location: Raghunathpur subdivision, Purulia district
- Region: West Bengal, India

History
- Built: 11th century
- Built by: Rudrasikhara

Telkupi (or Tailakampi) is a submerged location of archaeological interest in Purulia district of West Bengal, India. The area, along with most of the temples situated there, was submerged in 1959 as a consequence to the construction of a dam across Damodar river at Panchet in Dhanbad district, then in Bihar.

== Geography ==
Places in Raghunathpur subdivision in Purulia district
M: municipal town, CT: census town, R: rural/ urban centre, H: historical/ religious centre, T: tourist centre
Owing to space constraints in the small map, the actual locations in a larger map may vary slightly

=== Location ===
Telkupi is located at 23.666362°N 86.606561°E

Note: The map alongside presents some of the notable locations in the subdivision. All places marked in the map are linked in the larger full screen map.

== History ==
Formerly known as Tailakampi, Telkupi is the capital of Rudrasikhara, a local ruler of the area in 11th century, who helped Pala king, Ramapala, to recover Varendra from Bhima. The royal chronicle of Panchkot Raj of Shikhar dynasty mentions that Rudrashikhara rose to power in 1098 AD. India historian Niharranjan Ray assumes that he ruled from 1070 to 1120. Sandhyakar Nandi in his poem Ramacharitam comments that like a wildfire, Rudrasikhara, was an expert in warfare, crushed the pride of the rulers of rivers and mountains.

Tailakampi was a commercial hub in 10th to 13th century. It is believed that most of the temples were funded by the 'Banik' or business people.

== Temples ==
=== Description by Beglar ===
In 1878, an Armenian-Indian archeologist Joseph David Beglar, gave the first ever description about the temples of Telkupi in his report to the Archaeological Survey of India. According to his report, the place was full of temples and the number was higher than any other place in the Chota Nagpur Plateau region. The temples were divided into three clusters, the largest group among them was situated to the north of Telkupi village near the Damodar river, the second group to the west of the village and the third group to the south-eastern part of the village.

==== First group of temples ====
- No. 1: This south-facing temple, made of stone, was situated in the northernmost part of the first cluster, consisting of a single cell, with a lingam as the deity of worship inside, situated 2 feet (0.61 m) below the still of entrance. The temple was not much ornamented. Beglar noticed that the upper part of the temple was almost intact at the time of his report.
- No. 2: This south-facing stone-made temple had a sculpture of Gajalakshmi over the entrance, with a lingam inside. Beglar found the upper portion of the temple broken and accumulated sand in the cell rose 6 inches (150 mm) of the still of entrance.
- No. 3: This west-facing temple, with a lingam inside, was similar to No. 2 temple but Beglar found the upper portion missing and the sill of the entrance buried 4 feet (1.2 m) below accumulated rubbish.
- No. 4: This east-facing almost-ruined temple had a sculpture of lotus over the entrance and a well-preserved four-armed statue of Vishnu was inside the temple as the deity of worship.
- No. 5: This east-facing temple, had a sculpture of Ganesha over the entrance. Beglar found the upper portion of the temple missing.

== Telkupi picture gallery ==
Unknown temple at Telkupi - photographed by JD Beglar in 1898. Collection: Leiden University Library, Royal Netherlands Institute of South East Asian and Caribbean Studies

Unknown temple at Telkupi - photographed by unknown person in 1897. Collection same as first photograph

Unknown temple at Telkupi - photographed by unknown person in 1897. Collection same as first photograph
