= Bongabari =

- Village
- Location in West Bengal, India Bongabari (India)
- Coordinates: 23°21′28.1″N 86°23′14.5″E
- Country: India
- State: West Bengal
- District: Purulia

Population (2011)
  - Total: 4,215

Languages
  - Official: Bengali, English
- Time zone: UTC+5:30 (IST)
- PIN: 723147 (Vivekanandanagar)
- Telephone/STD code: 03254
- Lok Sabha constituency: Purulia
- Vidhan Sabha constituency: Purulia
- Website: purulia.gov.in

Bongabari is a village in the Purulia II CD block in the Purulia Sadar subdivision of the Purulia district in the state of West Bengal, India.

== Geography ==
Places in Purulia Sadar subdivision in Purulia district
M: municipality, CT: census town, R: rural/ urban centre, H: historical/ religious centre, F: facility
Owing to space constraints in the small map, the actual locations in a larger map may vary slightly

=== Location ===
Bongabari is located at 23°21′28.1″N 86°23′14.5″E.

=== Area overview ===
Purulia district forms the lowest step of the Chota Nagpur Plateau. The general scenario is undulating land with scattered hills. Purulia Sadar subdivision covers the central portion of the district. 83.80% of the population of the subdivision lives in rural areas. The map alongside shows some urbanization around Purulia city. 18.58% of the population, the highest among the subdivisions of the district, lives in urban areas. There are 4 census towns in the subdivision. The Kangsabati (locally called Kansai) flows through the subdivision. The subdivision has old temples, some of them belonging to the 11th century or earlier. The focus is on education - the university, the sainik school, the Ramakrishna Mission Vidyapith at Bongabari, the upcoming medical college at Hatuara, et al.

Note: The map alongside presents some of the notable locations in the subdivision. All places marked in the map are linked in the larger full screen map.

== Demographics ==
According to the 2011 Census of India Bongabari had a total population of 4,215 of which 2,082 (49%) were males and 2,133 (51%) were females. There were 500 persons in the age range of 0–6 years. The total number of literate persons in Bongabari was 2,559 (68.88% of the population over 6 years).

== Civic administration ==
=== CD block HQ ===
The headquarters of the Purulia II CD block are located at Bongabari.

== Transport ==
State Highway 5 (West Bengal) running from Rupnarayanpur (in the Bardhaman district) to Junput (in the Purba Medinipur district) (locally popular as Barakar Road) passes through Bongabari.

== Education ==
Ramakrishna Mission Vidyapith, Purulia, is a residential boys only higher secondary school with both Bengali and English as medium of instruction. It was established in 1967. It bagged the best school award from the school education department of West Bengal government.

Bongabari Girls High School is a Bengali-medium girls only institution established in 1987. It has facilities for teaching from class V to class XII. Kasturba Gandhi Balika Vidyalaya hostel facilities, located in the existing school, provides free boarding, financial support etc. for students from disadvantaged sections of society.

Manbhum Drishti Pratibandhi Sikshayatan is a middle school for the visually impaired. It is a Bengali-medium coeducational institution established in 1997. It has facilities for teaching from class I to class VIII.

== Culture ==
There is a small rekha deul built of stone in Chharra, located nearby. The tower is extensively carved. The ornamentation of the sikhara suggests that it belongs to an age earlier than the Telkupi temples, i.e., earlier than 11th century. There was another temple which has fallen. It was a plain pancha ratna temple. With loose Jain sculptures strewn around the village, it is possible that both were Jain temples.
