= Purulia Assembly constituency =

Purulia
- Constituency No. 242 for the West Bengal Legislative Assembly
- Interactive Map Outlining Purulia Assembly Constituency

Constituency details
- Country: India
- Region: East India
- State: West Bengal
- District: Purulia
- Lok Sabha constituency: Purulia
- Established: 1957
- Total electors: 192,269
- Reservation: None

Member of Legislative Assembly
- 18th West Bengal Legislative Assembly
- Incumbent Sudip Kumar Mukherjee
- Party: BJP
- Alliance: NDA
- Elected year: 2026

Purulia Assembly constituency is an assembly constituency in Purulia district in the Indian state of West Bengal.

== Overview ==
As per orders of the Delimitation Commission, No. 242 Purulia Assembly constituency is composed of the following: Purulia municipality; Purulia II community development blocks; Bhandar Purachipida and Manara gram panchayats of Purulia I community development block.

Purulia Assembly constituency is part of No. 35 Purulia (Lok Sabha constituency).

== Members of the Legislative Assembly ==
Year	Name	Party
1952	Dimo Charmahar	Lok Sewak Sangh
1952	Samarendra Nath Ojha	Lok Sewak Sangh
1957	Labanya Prabha Ghosh	Lok Sewak Sangh
1957	Nakul Chandra Sahis	Lok Sewak Sangh
1962	Tara Pada Roy	Indian National Congress
1967	Bibhuti Bhusan Dasgupta	Lok Sewak Sangh
1969	Bibhuti Bhusan Dasgupta	Lok Sewak Sangh
1971	Sanat Kumar Mukherjee	Indian National Congress
1972	Sanat Kumar Mukherjee	Indian National Congress
1977	Mahadeb Mukherjee	Communist Party of India
1982	Sukumar Roy	Indian Congress
1987	Mamata Mukherjee	Communist Party of India
1991	Mamata Mukherjee	Communist Party of India
1996	Mamata Mukherjee	Communist Party of India
2001	Nikhil Mukherjee	Communist Party of India
2006	Nikhil Mukherjee	Communist Party of India
2011	K.P. Singh Deo	All India Trinamool Congress
2016	Sudip Kumar Mukherjee	Indian National Congress
2021	Sudip Kumar Mukherjee	Bharatiya Janata Party
2026	Sudip Kumar Mukherjee	Bharatiya Janata Party

== Election results ==
=== 2026 ===
2026 West Bengal Legislative Assembly election: Purulia
Party	Candidate	Votes	%	±%
BJP	Sudip Kumar Mukherjee	128,454	55.69	+12.31
AITC	Sujoy Banerjee	79,201	34.34	−5.64
CPI(M)	Sayantan Ghosh	10,675	4.63	
INC	Sayantan Ghosh	4,367	1.89	−10.19
NOTA	None of the above	1,728	0.75	−0.5
Majority		49,253	21.35	+17.95
Turnout		230,653	91.42	+11.53
BJP hold		Swing		

=== 2021 ===
West Bengal Legislative Assembly Election, 2021: Purulia
Party	Candidate	Votes	%	±%
BJP	Sudip Kumar Mukherjee	89,733	43.38	+603.4
AITC	Sujoy Banerjee	82,715	39.98	
INC	Partha Pratim Banerjee	24,996	12.08	−69.28
Independent	Birendranath Mahato	1,918	0.93	
NOTA	None of the above	2,588	1.25	
Majority		7,018	3.4	
Turnout		206,868	79.89	
BJP gain from INC		Swing		

=== 2016 ===
In the 2016 elections, Sudip Kumar Mukherjee of Indian National Congress defeated his nearest rival Jyotiprasad Singh Deo of All India Trinamool Congress.

2016 West Bengal Legislative Assembly election: Purulia
Party	Candidate	Votes	%	±%
INC	Sudip Kumar Mukherjee	81,365	44.58	
AITC	Dibyajyoti Prasad Singh Deo	76,454	41.89	
BJP	Nagendra Kumar Ojha	12,757	6.99	
Independent	Swapan Kumar Mahato	2,162	1.82	
BSP	Thuru Mahato	1,511	0.83	
Independent	Dhiren Rajak	1,199	0.66	
Mulnibasi Party of India	Upendranath Mahato	1,104	0.55	
AJSU	Dhirendra Nath Rajak	696	0.35	
Independent	Binay Mahato	651	0.36	
SUCI(C)	Subrata Mukherjee	642	0.35	
Independent	Alok Pancharia	625	0.34	
Independent	Anita Mahato	488	0.27	
NOTA	None of the above	2,974	1.63	
Majority				
Turnout		182,528	80.16	
INC gain from AITC		Swing		

=== 2011 ===
In the 2011 elections, Kamakshya Prasad Singh Deo of Trinamool Congress defeated his nearest rival Koushik Majumder of CPI(M).

West Bengal assembly elections, 2011: Purulia
Party	Candidate	Votes	%	±%
AITC	Kamakshya Prasad Singh Deo	83,396	53.95	+8.49#
CPI(M)	Koushik Majumdar	56,909	36.81	−13.49
BJP	Panchkari Mukherjee	3,630	2.35	
PDS	Sanat Sao	2,705		
JMM	Sohan Rajowar	2,386		
Independent	Dhiren Rajak	2,241		
AJSU	Naran Sahis	1,915		
BSP	Thuru Mahato	140		
Turnout		154,589	80.4	
AITC gain from CPI(M)		Swing	22.38#	

.# Swing calculated on Congress+Trinamool Congress vote percentages taken together in 2006.

=== 2006 ===
In the 2006 and 2001 state assembly elections, Nikhil Mukherjee of CPI(M) won the Purulia assembly seat defeating his nearest rivals Dr. Sukumar Roy of Congress and Kamakshya Prasad Singh Deo of Trinamool Congress respectively. Contests in most years were multi cornered but only winners and runners are being mentioned. Mamata Mukherjee of CPI(M) defeated Sukumar Roy of Congress in 1996, 1991 and 1987. Sukumar Roy of ICS defeated Mahadeb Mukherjee of CPI(M) in 1982. Mahadeb Mukherjee of CPI(M) defeated Sanat Kumar Mukherjee, Independent, in 1977.

=== 1972 ===
Sanat Kumar Mukherjee of Congress won in 1972 and 1971. Bibhuti Bhusan Dasgupta of Lok Sewak Sangh/ Independent won in 1969 and 1967. Tara Pada Roy of Congress won in 1962. In 1957 Purulia was a joint seat with one seat reserved for SC. Nakul Chandra Sahis, Independent, and Labanya Prabha Ghosh, Independent, won in 1957.
