= Boro, Purulia =

Boro
- Village
- Location in West Bengal, India Boro (India)
- Coordinates: 22°55′38.6″N 86°35′31.2″E
- Country: India
- State: West Bengal
- District: Purulia

Population (2011)
  - Total: 1,565

Languages
  - Official: Bengali, English
- Time zone: UTC+5:30 (IST)
- PIN: 723131 (Boro)
- Telephone/STD code: 03253
- Lok Sabha constituency: Jhargram
- Vidhan Sabha constituency: Bandwan
- Website: purulia.gov.in

Boro is a village, with a police station, in the Manbazar II CD block in the Manbazar subdivision of Purulia district in the state of West Bengal, India.

== Geography ==
Places in Manbazar subdivision in Purulia district
CT: census town, R: rural/ urban centre, H: historical/ religious centre
Owing to space constraints in the small map, the actual locations in a larger map may vary slightly

=== Location ===
Boro is located at 22°55′38.6″N 86°35′31.2″E.

=== Area overview ===
Purulia district forms the lowest step of the Chota Nagpur Plateau. The general scenario is undulating land with scattered hills. Manbazar subdivision, shown in the map alongside, is located in the eastern part of the district. It is an overwhelmingly rural subdivision with 96.32% of the population living in the rural areas and 3.68% living in the urban areas. There are 3 census towns in the subdivision. The map shows the Kangsabati Project Reservoir. The Mukutmanipur Dam is in Bankura district but the upper portion of the reservoir is in Manbazar subdivision. The remnants of old temples and deities are found in the subdivision also, as in other parts of the district. The subdivision has a very high proportion of Scheduled Castes and Scheduled Tribes. Bandwan CD block has 51.86% ST population, Manbazar II CD block has 48.97% ST population. Manbazar I CD block has 22.03% ST and 22.44% SC. Puncha CD block has 24.74% ST and 14.54 SC. Writing in 1911, H. Coupland, ICS, speaks of the aboriginal races largely predominating in the old Manbhum district. He particularly mentions the Kurmis, Santhals, Bhumij and Bauri.

Note: The map alongside presents some of the notable locations in the subdivision. All places marked in the map are linked in the larger full screen map.

== Demographics ==
According to the 2011 Census of India, Boro had a total population of 1,565 of which 785 (50%) were males and 780 (50%) were females. There were 182 persons in the age range of 0–6 years. The total number of literate persons in Boro was 937 (67.75% of the population over 6 years).

== Civic administration ==
=== Police station ===
Boro police station has jurisdiction over the Manbazar II CD block. The area covered is 295.28 km^{2} and the population covered is 97,154.

=== CD block HQ ===
The headquarters of the Manbazar II CD block are located at Boro. The District Census Handbook shows, in its map, Bargorya as headquarters of Manbazar II CD Block, but the website of Manabazar II Block Development Officer mentions Boro as headquarters of the block. We are taking the latter information.

== Transport ==
SH 5 running from Rupnarayanpur (in Bardhaman district) to Junput (in Purba Medinipur district) passes through Boro.
