= Manbazar subdivision =

- Subdivision
- Interactive map of Manbazar subdivision
- Coordinates: 23.0615°N 86.6641°E
- Country: India
- State: West Bengal
- District: Purulia
- Headquarters: Manbazar

Area
  - Total: 1,766.55 km^{2} (682.07 sq mi)

Population (2011)
  - Total: 640,588
  - Density: 362.621/km^{2} (939.184/sq mi)

Languages
  - Official: Bengali, English, Hindi
- Time zone: UTC+5:30 (IST)
- Postal code: 723131
- ISO 3166 code: IN-WB
- Vehicle registration: WB 80
- Website: http://purulia.gov.in/

Manbazar subdivision is a subdivision of the Purulia district in the state of West Bengal, India.

== History ==
Purulia district was divided into four subdivisions, viz., Purulia Sadar, Manbazar, Jhalda and Raghunathpur, with effect from 6 April 2017, as per Order No. 100-AR/P/2R-2/1999 dated 30 March 2017 issued by the Government of West Bengal, in the Kolkata Gazette dated 30 March 2017.

== Subdivisions ==
Purulia district is divided into the following administrative subdivisions:

Subdivision	Headquarter	Area km^{2}	Population (2011)	Rural Population % (2011)	Urban Population % (2011)
Purulia Sadar	Purulia	1,474.81	878,373	81.42	18.58
Manbazar	Manbazar	1,766.55	640,588	96.32	3.68
Jhalda	Jhalda	1,233.97	573,771	91.02	8.98
Raghunathpur	Raghunathpur	1,733.01	838,128	83.80	16.20
Purulia district	Purulia	6208.34	2,930,860	87.24	12.76

Note: The 2011 census data has been recast as per reorganisation of the subdivisions. There may be minor variations.

Places in Manbazar subdivision in Purulia district
CT: census town, R: rural/ urban centre, H: historical/ religious centre
Owing to space constraints in the small map, the actual locations in a larger map may vary slightly

== Police stations ==
Police stations in the Manbazar subdivision have the following features and jurisdiction:

Police Station	Area covered km^{2}	Inter-state border km	Municipal Town	CD block
Bandwan	367.08	52.44	-	Bandwan
Manbazar	411.11	-	-	Manbazar I
Kenda	352.81	-	-	Manbazar I, Puncha, Purulia I
Puncha	330.11	-	-	Puncha, Manbazar I
Boro	295.28	-	-	Manbazar II
Barabazar	414	44.39	-	Barabazar

== Blocks ==
Community development blocks in Manbazar subdivision are:

CD block	Headquarters	Area km^{2}	Population (2011)	SC %	ST %	Literacy rate %	Census Towns
Barabazar	Barabazar	418.06	170,569	7.39	19.40	63.27	1
Bandwan	Bandwan	351.25	94,929	5.93	51.86	61.38	1
Manbazar I	Manbazar	381.32	154,071	22.44	22.03	63.78	1
Manbazar II	Boro	285.81	97,164	6.51	48.97	60.27	
Puncha	Puncha	330.11	123,855	14.54	24.74	68.14	

== Gram panchayats ==
Gram panchayats in Manbazar subdivision are :

- Barabazar block: Banjora, Berada, Latpada, Tumrasole, Bansbera, Bhagabandh, Sindri, Barabazar and Dhelatbamu Sukurhutu.
- Bandwan block: Bandwan, Dhadka, Kuchia, Kumra, Chirudih, Gurur, Kuilapal and Supudih.
- Manbazar–I block: Bamni Majhihira, Chandra–Pairachali, Gopalnagar, Manbazar, Bhalubasa, Jitujuri, Baramasya–Ramnagar, Bisri, Dhanarah and Kamta Jangidiri.
- Manbazar–II block: Ankro Barakadam, Bari–Jagda, Buribandh, Kumari, Bargoria–Jamtoria, Boro Jaragara and Dighi.
- Puncha block: Bagda, Chirudih, Lakhra, Pirrah, Chandra, Jambad, Napara, Puncha, Kenda and Panipathar.

== Education ==
The table below offers a comprehensive picture of the education scenario in Purulia district, after reorganisation of the district in 2017, with data for the year 2013–14. (There may be minor variations because of data recasting).:

Subdivision	Primary School		Middle School		High School		Higher Secondary School		General College, Univ		Technical / Professional Instt		Non-formal Education	
Subdivision	Institution	Student	Institution	Student	Institution	Student	Institution	Student	Institution	Student	Institution	Student	Institution	Student
Purulia Sadar	818	87,425	114	7,292	26	11,345	83	80,138	6	12,463	11	1,806	1,461	49,234
Manbazar	832	59,105	121	4,141	21	7,615	64	63,466	5	5,441	3	256	1,371	41,267
Jhalda	533	53,629	67	3,453	2	1,415	47	55,492	6	2,332	2	98	836	34,779
Raghunathpur	818	72,073	126	8,925	31	16,055	67	68,188	4	7,007	5	649	1,761	45,472
Purulia district	3,001	272,232	428	23,811	80	36,430	261	267,284	21	27,243	21	3.009	5,429	170,752

Note: Primary schools include junior basic schools; middle schools, high schools and higher secondary schools include madrasahs; technical schools include junior technical schools, junior government polytechnics, industrial technical institutes, industrial training centres, nursing training institutes etc.; technical and professional colleges include engineering colleges, medical colleges, para-medical institutes, management colleges, teachers training and nursing training colleges, law colleges, art colleges, music colleges etc. Special and non-formal education centres include sishu siksha kendras, madhyamik siksha kendras, centres of Rabindra mukta vidyalaya, recognised Sanskrit tols, institutions for the blind and other handicapped persons, Anganwadi centres, reformatory schools etc.

=== Educational institutions ===
The following institutions are located in Manbazar subdivision:

- Manbhum Mahavidyalaya was established in 1986 at Manbazar.
- Government General Degree College, Manbazar II at Susunia, PO Kumari, was established in 2015.
- Sitaram Mahato Memorial College was established in 2015 at Kuruktopa.
- Bandwan Mahavidyalaya was established in 2010 at Bandwan.
- Barabazar Bikram Tudu Memorial College was established in 2006 at Barabazar.
- Ramananda Centenary College was established in 1971 at Laulara.

== Healthcare ==
The table below (all data in numbers) presents an overview of the medical facilities available and patients treated in the hospitals, health centres and sub-centres in 2014 in Purulia district, after reorganisation of the district in 2017, with data for the year 2013–14. (There may be minor variations because of data recasting).:

Subdivision	Health & Family Welfare Deptt, WB				Other State Govt Deptts	Local bodies	Central Govt Deptts / PSUs	NGO / Private Nursing Homes	Total	Total Number of Beds	Total Number of Doctors*	Indoor Patients	Outdoor Patients
Subdivision	Hospitals	Rural Hospitals	Block Primary Health Centres	Primary Health Centres	Other State Govt Deptts	Local bodies	Central Govt Deptts / PSUs	NGO / Private Nursing Homes	Total	Total Number of Beds	Total Number of Doctors*	Indoor Patients	Outdoor Patients
Purulia Sadar	2	2	3	13	2	-	-	9	31	1,203	96	209,390	1,626,712
Manbazar	-	1	4	14	-	-	-	-	19	254	40	35,184	990,561
Jhalda	-	1	3	10	-	-	-	-	15	196	23	28,522	820,961
Raghunathpur	1	1	4	13	-	-	1	2	22	835	77	55,866	1,071,786
Purulia district	3	5	14	50	2	-	1	12	87	2,488	236	328,962	4,510,020

.* Excluding nursing homes.

=== Medical facilities ===
Medical facilities in Manbazar subdivision are as follows:

Rural Hospitals: (Name, CD block, location, beds)

- Manbazar Rural Hospital, Manbazar I CD block, Manbazar, 40 beds
- Puncha Rural Hospital, Puncha CD block, Puncha, 30 beds
- Bandwan Rural Hospital, Bandwan CD block, Bandwan, 30 beds
- Barabazar Rural Hospital, Barabazar CD block, Barabazar, 30 beds

Block Primary Health Centres: (Name, CD block, location, beds)

- Bari Block Primary Health Centre, Manbazar II CD block, Bari, 15 beds

Primary Health Centres : (CD block-wise)(CD block, PHC location, beds)

- Puncha CD block: Bagda (10), Nowagarh (PO Raj Nowagarh) (6), Anandadwip (Kuruktopa )(2)
- Manbazar I CD block: Kuda (PO Mohara) (4), Pairachali (10)
- Manbazar II CD block: Ankro (4), Dighi (4), Jamtoria (2), Basantapur (10)
- Bandwan CD block: Chirudih (10), Latapara (2), Gurpur (6)
- Barabazar CD block: Sindhri (10), Bamundiha (4)

== Electoral constituencies ==
Lok Sabha (parliamentary) and Vidhan Sabha (state assembly) constituencies in Purulia district were as follows:

Lok Sabha constituency	Vidhan Sabha constituency	Reservation	CD Block and/or Gram panchayat
Purulia	Balarampur	None	Balarampur CD Block; Chakaltore, Dimdiha, Durku, Garafusra, Lagda and Sonaijuri gram panchayats of Purulia I CD Block; and Chatu Hansa, Hensla and Puara gram panchayats of Arsha CD Block.
	Baghmundi	None	Jhalda municipality; Jhalda I and Baghmundi CD Blocks; Hetgugui and Sirkabad gram panchayats of Arsha CD Block.
	Joypur	None	Joypur and Jhalda II CD Blocks; Arsha, Beldih and Manikary gram panchayats of Arsha CD Block.
	Purulia	None	Purulia municipality; Purulia II CD Block; Bhandar Purachipida and Manara gram panchayats of Purulia I CD Block.
	Manbazar	ST	Manbazar I and Puncha CD Blocks; Chatumadar, Daldali and Manguria Lalpur gram panchayats of Hura CD Block.
	Kashipur	None	Kashipur CD Block; Hura, Jabarrah, Kalabani, Keshargarh, Ladhurka, Lakhanpur and Rakhera Bishpuri gram panchayats of Hura CD Block.
	Para	SC	Para and Raghunathpur II CD Blocks.
Bankura	Raghunathpur	SC	Raghunathpur municipality; Raghunathpur I, Neturia and Santuri CD Blocks.
	Other assembly segments in Bankura district		
Jhargram (ST)	Bandwan	ST	Bandwan, Barabazar and Manbazar II CD Blocks.
	Other assembly segments in Paschim Medinipur district		
