= Bandwan =

- Census Town
- Location in West Bengal, India Bandwan (India)
- Coordinates: 22°52′33.6″N 86°30′25.2″E
- Country: India
- State: West Bengal
- District: Purulia

Population (2011)
  - Total: 5,993

Languages
  - Official: Bengali, English
- Time zone: UTC+5:30 (IST)
- PIN: 723129
- Telephone code: 03253
- Vehicle registration: WB56;WB80
- Lok Sabha constituency: Jhargram
- Vidhan Sabha constituency: Bandwan
- Website: purulia.gov.in

Bandwan is a census town in the Bandwan CD block in the Manbazar subdivision of the Purulia district in the state of West Bengal, India.

== Geography ==
Places in Manbazar subdivision in Purulia district
CT: census town, R: rural/ urban centre, H: historical/ religious centre
Owing to space constraints in the small map, the actual locations in a larger map may vary slightly

=== Location ===
Bandwan is located at 22°52′33.6″N 86°30′25.2″E.

=== Area overview ===
Purulia district forms the lowest step of the Chota Nagpur Plateau. The general scenario is undulating land with scattered hills. Manbazar subdivision, shown in the map alongside, is located in the eastern part of the district. It is an overwhelmingly rural subdivision with 96.32% of the population living in the rural areas and 3.68% living in the urban areas. There are 3 census towns in the subdivision. The map shows the Kangsabati Project Reservoir. The Mukutmanipur Dam is in Bankura district but the upper portion of the reservoir is in Manbazar subdivision. The remnants of old temples and deities are found in the subdivision also, as in other parts of the district. The subdivision has a very high proportion of Scheduled Castes and Scheduled Tribes. Bandwan CD block has 51.86% ST population, Manbazar II CD block has 48.97% ST population. Manbazar I CD block has 22.03% ST and 22.44% SC. Puncha CD block has 24.74% ST and 14.54 SC. Writing in 1911, H. Coupland, ICS, speaks of the aboriginal races largely predominating in the old Manbhum district. He particularly mentions the Kurmis, Santhals, Bhumij and Bauri.

Note: The map alongside presents some of the notable locations in the subdivision. All places marked in the map are linked in the larger full screen map.

== Demographics ==
As per 2011 Census of India Bandwan had a total population of 5,993 of which 3,112 (52%) were males and 2,881 (48%) were females. Population below 6 years was 692. The total number of literates in Bandwan was 4,131 (77.93% of the population over 6 years).

== Civic administration ==
=== Police station ===
Bandwan police station has jurisdiction over the Bandwan CD block. The area covered is 367.08 km^{2} and the population covered is 95,002. It has 52.44 km of inter-state border with Galudih, Patamda and Kamalpur police stations in East Singhbhum district of Jharkhand.

=== CD block HQ ===
The headquarters of the Bandwan CD block are located at Bandwan.

== Infrastructure ==
According to the District Census Handbook 2011, Puruliya, Bandwan covered an area of 3.6145 km^{2}. Among the civic amenities, it had 5 km roads with both open and covered drains, the protected water supply involved overhead tank, tap water from treated sources, tank/pond/lake. It had 1,235 domestic electric connections, 218 road light points. Among the educational facilities it had were 9 primary schools, 3 senior secondary schools. Among the social, recreational and cultural facilities, it had 1 stadium, 1 auditorium/ community hall, 1 public library, 1 reding room. Three important commodities it produced were bakery products, puffed rice, pot making. It had branches of 1 nationalised bank, 1 non-agricultural credit society.

== Transport ==
SH 5 running from Rupnarayanpur (in Bardhaman district) to Junput (in Purba Medinipur district) passes through Bandwan. The road from Bandwan to Mahulia, on NH 18, in East Singhbhum district of Jharkhand, and the Barabazar-Bandwan Road meets SH 5 at Bandwan.

Bandwan Birsa Munda Bus stand is one of the important Bus stand in Jangalmahal for its location near Jharkhand border. Major routes are -

Bandwan - Jamshedpur - Ranchi mail

Bandwan - Kolkata

Bandwan - Purulia

Bandwan - Khatra - Bankura - Durgapur

Bandwan - Jhargram - Midnapore - Kharagpur

Bandwan - Manbazar - Bankura - Burdwan

Bandwan - Siliguri Daily Service etc

SBSTC has a Bus Depot at Bandwan.

== Education ==
Bandwan Mahavidyalaya at Bandwan is a government aided private college at village: Chilla, PO Jitan. It is affiliated to Sidho Kanho Birsha University. It offers courses in B.A. honours in Bengali, English, Sanskrit, Santhali, Political Science, history, Education and B.A. pass.

Bandwan Dr. A.N. Jha High School, Bandwan R.N.C Vidyapith, Bandwan Girl's High School, Bandwan Government Model School is present in Bandwan Town.

Bandwan Government Polytechnic College is one of the major institute in the District

There are also 4 government primary school and 8 private school upto class 4/5 like Gopiram Memorial Public School, JEF Public School, Sacred Heart Public School, Bandwan Board Primary School etc

== Healthcare ==
Bandwan Rural Hospital, with 30 beds, is a major government medical facility in Bandwan CD block.
