= Barabazar =

Barabazar Barabazar Barabhum
- Census Town
- Location in West Bengal, India Barabazar (India)
- Coordinates: 23°01′55.2″N 86°21′57.6″E
- Country: India
- State: West Bengal
- District: Purulia

Population (2011)
  - Total: 8,056

Languages
  - Official: Bengali, English
- Time zone: UTC+5:30 (IST)
- ISO 3166 code: IN-WB
- Vehicle registration: WB
- Lok Sabha constituency: Jhargram
- Vidhan Sabha constituency: Bandwan
- Website: purulia.gov.in

Barabazar is a census town in the Barabazar CD block in the Manbazar subdivision of the Purulia district in the state of West Bengal, India. Before Indian independence in 1947, it was the capital of an expensive zamindari of Barabhum in British India.

== Geography ==
Places in Manbazar subdivision in Purulia district
CT: census town, R: rural/ urban centre, H: historical/ religious centre
Owing to space constraints in the small map, the actual locations in a larger map may vary slightly

=== Area overview ===
Purulia district forms the lowest step of the Chota Nagpur Plateau. The general scenario is undulating land with scattered hills. Manbazar subdivision, shown in the map alongside, is located in the eastern part of the district. It is an overwhelmingly rural subdivision with 96.32% of the population living in the rural areas and 3.68% living in the urban areas. There are 3 census towns in the subdivision. The map shows the Kangsabati Project Reservoir. The Mukutmanipur Dam is in Bankura district but the upper portion of the reservoir is in Manbazar subdivision. The remnants of old temples and deities are found in the subdivision also, as in other parts of the district. The subdivision has a very high proportion of Scheduled Castes and Scheduled Tribes. Bandwan CD block has 51.86% ST population, Manbazar II CD block has 48.97% ST population. Manbazar I CD block has 22.03% ST and 22.44% SC. Puncha CD block has 24.74% ST and 14.54 SC. Writing in 1911, H. Coupland, ICS, speaks of the aboriginal races largely predominating in the old Manbhum district. He particularly mentions the Kurmis, Santhals, Bhumij and Bauri.

Note: The map alongside presents some of the notable locations in the subdivision. All places marked in the map are linked in the larger full screen map.

== Civic administration ==
=== Police station ===
Barabazar police station has jurisdiction over the Barabazar CD block. The area covered is 414 km^{2} and the population covered is 170,876. It has 44.39 km of inter-state border with Kamalpur and Boram police stations in the East Singhbhum district and Nimdih PS in the Seraikela Kharsawan district of Jharkhand.

== Demographics ==
According to the 2011 Census of India, Barabazar had a total population of 8,056 of which 4,195 (52%) were males and 3,861 (48%) were females. There were 881 persons in the age range of 0–6 years. The total number of literate persons in Barabazar was 5,751 (80.15% of the population over 6 years).

As of 2001 India census, Barabazar had a population of 7572. Males constitute 53% of the population and females 47%. Barabazar has an average literacy rate of 67%, higher than the national average of 59.5%; with 59% of the literates being male and 41% being female. 13% of the population is under 6 years of age.

== Infrastructure ==
According to the District Census Handbook 2011, Puruliya, Barabazar covered an area of 3.35 km^{2}. Among the civic amenities, the protected water supply involved overhead tank, service reservoir, tap water from treated sources, covered wells. It had 643 domestic electric connections. Among the medical facilities it had 16 medicine shops. Among the educational facilities it had were 4 primary schools, 2 middle schools, 2 secondary schools, 2 senior secondary schools, 1 general degree college. Three important commodities it produced were paddy, rice and vegetables.

== Education ==
Barabazar Bikram Tudu Memorial College was established in 2006.

Barabazar High School is a Bengali-medium coeducational institution established in 1885. It has facilities for teaching from class V to class XII. It has 10 computers and a library with 3,000 books.

Barabhum High School is a Bengali-medium coeducational institution established in 1956. It has facilities for teaching from class VI to class XII. It has a library with over 10,200 books.

Barabazar Girls’ High School is a Bengali-medium girls only institution established in 1979. It has facilities for teaching from class V to class XII. It has 10 computers and a library with 2,092 books.

== Transport ==
State Highway 4 passes through this town.

Barabhum railway station is on the Adra-Chandil section of the Asansol-Tatanagar-Kharagpur line of the South Eastern Railway.

== Healthcare ==
Barabazar Rural Hospital, with 30 beds, is a major government medical facility in Barabazar CD block.
