= Bandwan (community development block) =

- Community development block
- Coordinates: 22.876°N 86.507°E
- Country: India
- State: West Bengal
- District: Purulia

Government
  - Type: Community development block

Area
  - Total: 351.25 km^{2} (135.62 sq mi)
- Elevation: 263 m (863 ft)

Population (2011)
  - Total: 94,929
  - Density: 270.26/km^{2} (699.97/sq mi)

Languages
  - Official: Bengali, Santali, English
- Time zone: UTC+5:30 (IST)
- PIN: 723129 (Bandwan)
- Telephone/STD code: 03253
- ISO 3166 code: IN-WB
- Vehicle registration: WB-55, WB-56
- Literacy: 61.38%
- Lok Sabha constituency: Jhargram
- Vidhan Sabha constituency: Bandwan
- Website: purulia.gov.in

Bandwan is a community development block (CD block) that forms an administrative division in the Manbazar subdivision of the Purulia district in the Indian state of West Bengal.

== History ==
=== Background ===
The Jaina Bhagavati-Sutra of the 5th century AD mentions that Purulia was one of the sixteen mahajanapadas and was a part of the kingdom known as Vajra-bhumi in ancient times. In 1833, the Manbhum district was carved out of the Jungle Mahals district, with headquarters at Manbazar. In 1838, the headquarters was transferred to Purulia. After independence, when Manbhum district was a part of Bihar, efforts were made to impose Hindi on the Bengali-speaking majority of the district and it led to the Bengali Language Movement (Manbhum). In 1956, the Manbhum district was partitioned between Bihar and West Bengal under the States Reorganization Act and the Bihar and West Bengal (Transfer of Territories) Act of 1956.

=== Maoist activities ===
Banduan, along with certain other areas such as Manbazar, Jhalda, and Jaipur, was part of the area affected by the violent activities of Indian Maoists, also referred to as Naxalites.

=== Red corridor ===
106 districts spanning 10 states across India, described as being part of the left wing extremism activities, constitutes the Red corridor. In West Bengal the districts of Paschim Medinipur, Bankura, Purulia and Birbhum are part of the Red corridor. However, as of July 2016, there had been no reported incidents of Maoist related activities from these districts for the previous 4 years.

The CPI (Maoist) extremism affected CD blocks in the Purulia district were: Jhalda I, Jhalda II, Arsha, Baghmundi, Balarampur, Barabazar, Manbazar II and Bandwan. Certain reports also included Manbazar I and Joypur CD Blocks and some times indicted the whole of Purulia district.

The Lalgarh movement, which started attracting attention after the failed assassination attempt on Buddhadeb Bhattacharjee, then chief minister of West Bengal, in the Salboni area of the Paschim Medinipur district, on 2 November 2008 and the police action that followed, had also spread over to these areas. The movement was not just a political struggle but an armed struggle that concurrently took the look of a social struggle. A large number of CPI (M) activists were killed. Although the epi-centre of the movement was Lalgarh, it was spread across 19 police stations in three adjoining districts – Paschim Medinipur, Bankura and Purulia, all thickly forested and near the border with Jharkhand. The deployment of CRPF and other forces started on 11 June 2009. The movement came to an end after the 2011 state assembly elections and change of government in West Bengal. The death of Kishenji, the Maoist commander, on 24 November 2011 was the last major landmark.

== Geography ==
CD blocks in Purulia district

Bandwan is located at 22°52′34″N 86°30′25″E.

The Bandwan CD block is located in the south-eastern part of the district. The Bagmundi-Bandwan uplands is an area that has descended from the Ranchi Plateau.

The Bandwan CD block is bounded by the Manbazar II CD block on the north, the Ranibandh CD block, in the Bankura district, and the Binpur II CD block, in the Paschim Medinipur district, on the east, the Golmuri-cum-Jugsalai and Ghatshila CD blocks, in the East Singhbhum district of Jharkhand, on the south and the Patamda CD block, in the East Singhbhum district of Jharkhand, on the west.

The Bandwan CD block has an area of 351.25 km^{2}. It has 1 panchayat samity, 8 gram panchayats, 69 gram sansads (village councils), 135 mouzas and 131 inhabited villages. Bandwan police station serves this block. Headquarters of this CD block are at Bandwan.

Gram panchayats of the Bandwan block/ panchayat samiti are Bandwan, Chirudih, Dhadka, Gurur, Kuilapal, Kumra, Kunchia and Supudih.

== Demographics ==
=== Population ===
According to the 2011 Census of India the Bandwan CD block had a total population of 94,929, of which 88,936 were rural and 5,993 were urban. There were 47,798 (50%) males and 47,131 (50%) females. There were 12,150 persons in the age range of 0 to 6 years. The Scheduled Castes numbered 5,630 (5.93%) and the Scheduled Tribes numbered 49,232 (51.86%).

According to the 2001 census, the Bandwan block had a total population of 83,678, out of which 42,246 inhabitants were males and 41,427 were females. The Bandwan block registered a population growth of 14.55 per cent during the 1991-2001 decade. Decadal growth for the Purulia district was 13.96 per cent. Decadal growth in West Bengal was 17.84 per cent.

Census towns in the Bandwan CD block are (2011 census figures in brackets): Bandoan (5,993).

Villages in the Bandwan CD block are (2011 census figures in brackets): Dhadka (1,896), Kunchia (2,279), Kumra (631), Chirudih (1,415), Supudih (2,567), Gurur (1,500) and Kuilapal (985).

=== Literacy ===
According to the 2011 census the total number of literates in the Bandwan CD block was 50,810 (61.38% of the population over 6 years) out of which males numbered 31,016 (74.61% of the male population over 6 years) and females numbered 19,794 (48.03%) of the female population over 6 years). The gender disparity (the difference between female and male literacy rate was 26.58%.

See also – List of West Bengal districts ranked by literacy rate

Literacy in CD blocks of
Purulia district
Purulia Sadar subdivision
Arsha – 57.48%
Balarampur – 60.40%
Hura – 68.79%
Purulia I – 78.37%
Purulia II – 63.39%
Manbazar subdivision
Barabazar – 63.27
Bandwan – 61.38%
Manbazar I – 63.78%
Manbazar II – 60.27%
Puncha – 68.14%
Jhalda subdivision
Baghmundi – 57.17%
Jhalda I – 66.18%
Jhalda II – 54.76%
Joypur – 57.94%
Raghunathpur subdivision
Para – 65.62%
Raghunathpur I – 67.36%
Raghunathpur II – 67.29%
Neturia – 65.14%
Santuri – 64.15%
Kashipur – 71.06%
2011 Census: CD Block Wise

Primary Census Abstract Data

=== Language and religion ===
Religion in Bundwan CD block (2011)
Hinduism	55.78%
Other (tribal religion)	43.35%
Islam	0.59%
Other or not stated	0.28%

In the 2011 census Hindus numbered 52,950 and formed 55.78% of the population in Bandwan CD Block. Muslims numbered 558 and formed 0.59% of the population. Others numbered 41,431 and formed 43.64% of the population. Others include Addi Bassi, Marang Boro, Santal, Saranath, Sari Dharma, Sarna, Alchchi, Bidin, Sant, Saevdharm, Seran, Saran, Sarin, Kheria, and other religious communities. In 2001, Hindus were 60.64%, Muslims 0.75% and tribal religions 38.25% of the population respectively.

Languages of Bundwan CD block (2011)
1. Bengali (57.2%)
2. Santali (29.6%)
3. Kurmali (10.3%)
4. Mundari (1.13%)
5. Others (1.76%)

At the time of the 2011 census, 57.22% of the population spoke Bengali, 29.55% Santali, 10.34% Kurmali and 1.13% Mundari as their first language.

== Rural poverty ==
According to the Rural Household Survey in 2005, 32.85% of total number of families were BPL families in Purulia district. According to a World Bank report, as of 2012, 31-38% of the population in Purulia, Murshidabad and Uttar Dinajpur districts were below poverty level, the highest among the districts of West Bengal, which had an average 20% of the population below poverty line.

== Economy ==
=== Livelihood ===
Livelihood
in Bandwan CD block
1. Cultivators (18.5%)
2. Agricultural labourers (52.4%)
3. Household industries (10.1%)
4. Other Workers (19.1%)

In the Bandwan CD block in 2011, among the class of total workers, cultivators numbered 8,752 and formed 18.47%, agricultural labourers numbered 24,834 and formed 52.40%, household industry workers numbered 4,776 and formed 10.08% and other workers numbered 9,034 and formed 19.06%. Total workers numbered 47,396 and formed 49.93% of the total population, and non-workers numbered 47,533 and formed 50.07% of the population.

Note: In the census records a person is considered a cultivator, if the person is engaged in cultivation/ supervision of land owned by self/government/institution. When a person who works on another person's land for wages in cash or kind or share, is regarded as an agricultural labourer. Household industry is defined as an industry conducted by one or more members of the family within the household or village, and one that does not qualify for registration as a factory under the Factories Act. Other workers are persons engaged in some economic activity other than cultivators, agricultural labourers and household workers. It includes factory, mining, plantation, transport and office workers, those engaged in business and commerce, teachers, entertainment artistes and so on.

=== Infrastructure ===
There are 131 inhabited villages in the Bandwan CD block, as per the District Census Handbook, Puruliya, 2011. 100% villages have power supply. 100% villages have drinking water supply. 20 villages (15.27%) have post offices. 75 villages (57.25%) have telephones (including landlines, public call offices and mobile phones). 42 villages (32.06%) have pucca (paved) approach roads and 28 villages (21.37%) have transport communication (includes bus service, rail facility and navigable waterways). 4 villages (3.05%) have agricultural credit societies and 7 villages (5.34%) have banks.

=== Agriculture ===
In 2013-14, persons engaged in agriculture in the Bandwan CD block could be classified as follows: bargadars 0.56%, patta (document) holders 10.40%, small farmers (possessing land between 1 and 2 hectares) 6.00%, marginal farmers (possessing land up to 1 hectare) 40.37% and agricultural labourers 42.67%.

In 2013-14, the total area irrigated in the Bandwan CD block was 7,334.14 hectares, out of which 1,694.00 hectares were by canal irrigation, 4,833.90 hectares by tank water, 58.84 hectares by river lift irrigation, 122.80 hectares by open dug wells and 624.60 hectares by other means.

In 2013-14, the Bandwan CD block produced 3,533 tonnes of Aman paddy, the main winter crop, from 1,739 hectares, 29 tonnes of Boro paddy, the summer crop, from 16 hectares, 18 tonnes of wheat from 9 hectares, 2,286 tonnes of maize from 1,636 hectares and 10,574 tonnes of potato from 372 hectares. It also produced khesari, and mustard.

=== Banking ===
In 2013-14, the Bandwan CD block had offices of 3 commercial banks and 2 gramin banks.

=== Backward Regions Grant Fund ===
The Purulia district is listed as a backward region and receives financial support from the Backward Regions Grant Fund. The fund, created by the Government of India, is designed to redress regional imbalances in development. As of 2012, 272 districts across the country were listed under this scheme. The list includes 11 districts of West Bengal.

== Transport ==
In 2013-14, the Bandwan CD block had 4 originating/ terminating bus routes. The nearest railway station was 29 km from the CD Block headquarters.

State Highway 5 running from Rupnarayanpur (in the Bardhaman district) to Junput (in the Purba Medinipur district) passes through this block.

== Education ==
In 2013-14, the Bandwan CD block had 133 primary schools with 8,505 students, 19 middle schools with 442 students, 2 high schools with 868 students and 11 higher secondary schools with 9,109 students. Bandwan CD Block had 1 general college with 500 students, 1 professional/ technical institution with 62 students and 314 institutions with 6,967 students for special and non-formal education.

See also – Education in India

According to the 2011 census, in Bandwan CD block, amongst the 131 inhabited villages, 5 villages did not have a school, 35 villages had two or more primary schools, 28 villages had at least 1 primary and 1 middle school and 12 villages had at least 1 middle and 1 secondary school.

Bandwan Mahavidyalaya was established in 2010 at Bandwan.

== Healthcare ==
In 2014, the Bandwan CD block had 1 block primary health centre and 3 primary health centres, with total 48 beds and 6 doctors. 10,609 patients were treated indoor and 177,339 patients were treated outdoor in the health centres and subcentres of the CD Block.

Bandwan Rural Hospital, with 30 beds at Bandwan, is the major government medical facility in the Bandwan CD block. There are primary health centres at Chirudih (with 10 beds), Latapara (with 2 beds) and Gurpur (with 6 beds).
