= Susunia (disambiguation) =

Susunia refers a hill in West Bengal, India

Susunia may also refer to:

- Susunia, Purulia, a village in West Bengal, India
- Susina, Bankura, a village in West Bengal India

== See also ==
- Susana
