= Manbazar II =

- Community development block
- Coordinates: 22.8994227°N 86.6330338°E
- Country: India
- State: West Bengal
- District: Purulia

Government
  - Type: Community development block

Area
  - Total: 285.81 km^{2} (110.35 sq mi)
- Elevation: 266 m (873 ft)

Population (2011)
  - Total: 97,164
  - Density: 339.96/km^{2} (880.49/sq mi)

Languages
  - Official: Bengali, Santali, English
- Time zone: UTC+5:30 (IST)
- Telephone/STD code: 03253
- Vehicle registration: WB-55, WB-56
- Literacy: 60.27%
- Lok Sabha constituency: Jhargram
- Vidhan Sabha constituency: Bandwan
- Website: www.bdomanbazar2.org

Manbazar II is a community development block that forms an administrative division in the Manbazar subdivision of the Purulia district in the Indian state of West Bengal.

== History ==
=== Background ===
The Jaina Bhagavati-Sutra of the 5th century AD mentions that Purulia was one of the sixteen mahajanapadas and was a part of the kingdom known as Vajra-bhumi in ancient times. In 1833, the Manbhum district was carved out of the Jungle Mahals district, with headquarters at Manbazar. In 1838, the headquarters was transferred to Purulia. After independence, when Manbhum district was a part of Bihar, efforts were made to impose Hindi on the Bengali-speaking majority of the district and it led to the Bengali Language Movement (Manbhum). In 1956, the Manbhum district was partitioned between Bihar and West Bengal under the States Reorganization Act and the Bihar and West Bengal (Transfer of Territories) Act 1956.

=== Red corridor ===
106 districts spanning 10 states across India, described as being part of the left wing extremism activities, constitutes the Red corridor. In West Bengal, the districts of Paschim Medinipur, Bankura, Purulia and Birbhum are part of the Red corridor. However, as of July 2016, there had been no reported incidents of Maoist related activities from these districts for the previous 4 years.

The CPI (Maoist) extremism affected CD blocks in Purulia district were: Jhalda I, Jhalda II, Arsha, Baghmundi, Balarampur, Barabazar, Manbazar II and Bandwan. Certain reports also included the Manbazar I and Joypur CD blocks and some times indicted the whole of the Purulia district.

The Lalgarh movement, which started attracting attention after the failed assassination attempt on Buddhadeb Bhattacharjee, then chief minister of West Bengal, in the Salboni area of the Paschim Medinipur district, on 2 November 2008 and the police action that followed, had also spread over to these areas. The movement was not just a political struggle but an armed struggle that concurrently took the look of a social struggle. A large number of CPI (M) activists were killed. Although the epi-centre of the movement was Lalgarh, it was spread across 19 police stations in three adjoining districts – Paschim Medinipur, Bankura and Purulia, all thickly forested and near the border with Jharkhand. The deployment of the CRPF and other forces started on 11 June 2009. The movement came to an end after the 2011 state assembly elections and the change of government in West Bengal. The death of Kishenji, the Maoist commander, on 24 November 2011, was the last major landmark.

== Geography ==
CD blocks in Purulia district

Jamtoria is located at 22°53′58″N 86°37′59″E.

The Manbazar II CD block is bounded by the Manbazar I CD block on the north, the Ranibandh CD block, in the Bankura district, on the east, the Bandwan CD block on the south and the Patamda CD block, in the East Singhbhum district of Jharkhand, and the Barabazar CD block on the west.

The Manbazar II CD block has an area of 285.81 km^{2}. It has 1 panchayat samity, 7 gram panchayats, 75 gram sansads (village councils), 136 mouzas and 124 inhabited villages. Boro police station serves this block. Headquarters of this CD Block is at Boro. The District Census Handbook shows, in its map, Bargorya as headquarters of the Manbazar II CD block, but the website of the Manabazar II Block Development Officer mentions Boro as headquarters of the block. We are taking the latter information.

The Kangsabati Project has submerged large areas of Purulia District in the Manbazar area.

Gram panchayats of the Manbazar II block/ panchayat samiti are: Ankro-Borokadam, Bargoria-Jamtoria, Barijagda, Boro-Jaragora, Buribandh, Dighi and Kumari.

== Demographics ==
=== Population ===
According to the 2011 Census of India the Manbazar II CD block had a total population of 97,164, all of which were rural. There were 48,943 (50%) males and 48,221 (50%) females. There were 11,839 persons in the age range of 0 to 6 years. The Scheduled Castes numbered 6,321 (6.51%) and the Scheduled Tribes numbered 47,580 (48.97%).

According to the 2001 census, the Manbazar II block had a total population of 85,160, out of which 43,295 were males and 41,865 were females. The Manbazar II block registered a population growth of 7.86 per cent during the 1991-2001 decade. Decadal growth for the Purulia district was 13.96 per cent. Decadal growth in West Bengal was 17.84 per cent.

Large villages (with 4,000+ population) in the Manbazar II CD block are (2011 census figures in brackets): Ankro (4,581).

Other villages in the Manbazar II CD block are (2011 census figures in brackets): Jamteria (1,813), Dighi (2,110), Boro (1,565), Barkadam (1,059), Kumari (1,288), Bargorya (1,096), Buribandh (1,058), Jaragora (860), Bari (1,731) and Jagda (1,066).

=== Literacy ===
According to the 2011 census the total number of literate persons in the Manbazar II CD block was 51,425 (60.27% of the population over 6 years) out of which males numbered 31,997 (74.64% of the male population over 6 years) and females numbered 19,428 (45.76% of the female population over 6 years). The gender disparity (the difference between female and male literacy rates) was 28.88%.

See also – List of West Bengal districts ranked by literacy rate

Literacy in CD blocks of
Purulia district
Purulia Sadar subdivision
Arsha – 57.48%
Balarampur – 60.40%
Hura – 68.79%
Purulia I – 78.37%
Purulia II – 63.39%
Manbazar subdivision
Barabazar – 63.27
Bandwan – 61.38%
Manbazar I – 63.78%
Manbazar II – 60.27%
Puncha – 68.14%
Jhalda subdivision
Baghmundi – 57.17%
Jhalda I – 66.18%
Jhalda II – 54.76%
Joypur – 57.94%
Raghunathpur subdivision
Para – 65.62%
Raghunathpur I – 67.36%
Raghunathpur II – 67.29%
Neturia – 65.14%
Santuri – 64.15%
Kashipur – 71.06%
2011 Census: CD Block Wise

Primary Census Abstract Data

=== Language and religion ===
Religion in Manbazar II CD block (2011)
Hinduism	55.27%
Other (tribal religion)	43.00%
Islam	1.36%
Other or not stated	0.37%

In the 2011 census Hindus numbered 53,699 and formed 55.27% of the population in the Manbazar II CD Block. Muslims numbered 1,323 and formed 1.36% of the population. Others numbered 42,142 and formed 43.37% of the population. Others include Addi Bassi, Marang Boro, Santal, Saranath, Sari Dharma, Sarna, Alchchi, Bidin, Sant, Saevdharm, Seran, Saran, Sarin, Kheria, and other religious communities. In 2001, Hindus were 50.15%, Muslims 1.33% and tribal religions 48.04% of the population respectively.

Languages of Manbazar II CD block (2011)
1. Bengali (55.8%)
2. Santali (35.6%)
3. Kurmali (7.19%)
4. Others (1.35%)

At the time of the 2011 census, 55.84% of the population spoke Bengali, 35.62% Santali and 7.19% Kurmali as their first language.

== Rural Poverty ==
According to the Rural Household Survey in 2005, 32.85% of total number of families were BPL families in Purulia district. According to a World Bank report, as of 2012, 31-38% of the population in Purulia, Murshidabad and Uttar Dinajpur districts were below poverty level, the highest among the districts of West Bengal, which had an average 20% of the population below poverty line.

== Economy ==
=== Livelihood ===
Livelihood
in Manbazar II CD block
1. Cultivators (26.9%)
2. Agricultural labourers (62.3%)
3. Household industries (1.82%)
4. Other Workers (8.97%)

In the Manbazar II CD block in 2011, among the class of total workers, cultivators numbered 13,866 and formed 26.93%, agricultural labourers numbered 32,070 and formed 62.28%, household industry workers numbered 935 and formed 1.82% and other workers numbered 4,621 and formed 8.97%. Total workers numbered 51,492 and formed 52.99% of the total population, and non-workers numbered 45,672 and formed 47.01% of the population.

Note: In the census records a person is considered a cultivator, if the person is engaged in cultivation/ supervision of land owned by self/government/institution. When a person who works on another person's land for wages in cash or kind or share, is regarded as an agricultural labourer. Household industry is defined as an industry conducted by one or more members of the family within the household or village, and one that does not qualify for registration as a factory under the Factories Act. Other workers are persons engaged in some economic activity other than cultivators, agricultural labourers and household workers. It includes factory, mining, plantation, transport and office workers, those engaged in business and commerce, teachers, entertainment artistes and so on.

=== Infrastructure ===
There are 124 inhabited villages in the Manbazar II CD block, as per the District Census Handbook, Puruliya, 2011. 123 villages (99.19%) have power supply. 123 villages (99.19%) have drinking water supply. 23 villages (18.55%) have post offices. 104 villages (83.87%) have telephones (including landlines, public call offices and mobile phones). 41 villages (33.06%) have pucca (paved) approach roads and 42 villages (33.87%) have transport communication (includes bus service, rail facility and navigable waterways). 8 villages (6.45%) have agricultural credit societies and 3 villages (2.42%) have banks.

=== Agriculture ===
In 2013-14, persons engaged in agriculture in the Manbazar II CD Block could be classified as follows: bargadars 0.22%, patta (document) holders 4.60%, small farmers (possessing land between 1 and 2 hectares) 3.44%, marginal farmers (possessing land up to 1 hectare) 28.93% and agricultural labourers 62.80%.

In 2013-14, the total area irrigated in Manbazar II CD block was 4,205.60 hectares, out of which 1,909.00 hectares were by canal irrigation, 1,322.82 hectares by tank water, 67.38 hectares by river lift irrigation, 119.80 hectares by open dug wells and 787.30 hectares by other means.

In 2013-14, the Manbazar II CD block produced 34,381 tonnes of Aman paddy, the main winter crop, from 14,351 hectares, 448 tonnes of wheat from 170 hectares, 3,101 tonnes of maize from 1,656 hectares and 2,911 tonnes of potato from 220 hectares. It also produced maskalai, khesari, gram and mustard.

=== Banking ===
In 2013-14, the Manbazar II CD block had offices of 4 commercial banks and 4 gramin banks.

=== Backward Regions Grant Fund ===
The Purulia district is listed as a backward region and receives financial support from the Backward Regions Grant Fund. The fund, created by the Government of India, is designed to redress regional imbalances in development. As of 2012, 272 districts across the country were listed under this scheme. The list includes 11 districts of West Bengal.

== Transport ==
In 2013-14, the Manbazar II CD block had 6 originating/ terminating bus routes. The nearest railway station was 80 km from the CD Block headquarters.

The State Highway 5 running from Rupnarayanpur (in the Bardhaman district) to Junput (in the Purba Medinipur district) passes through this block.

== Education ==
In 2013-14, the Manbazar II CD block had 137 primary schools with 7,679 students, 21 middle schools with 926 students, 4 high schools with 969 students and 11 higher secondary schools with 8,527 students. Manbazar II CD Block had 1 professional/ technical institution with 100 students and 235 institutions with 6,137 students for special and non-formal education.

See also – Education in India

According to the 2011 census, in Manbazar II CD block, amongst the 124 inhabited villages, 8 villages did not have a school, 43 villages had two or more primary schools, 26 villages had at least 1 primary and 1 middle school and 14 villages had at least 1 middle and 1 secondary school.

Government General Degree College, Manbazar II at Susunia, PO Kumari, was established in 2015.

== Healthcare ==
In 2014, the Manbazar II CD block had 1 block primary health centre and 4 primary health centres, with total 50 beds and 10 doctors. 4,364 patients were treated indoor and 170,573 patients were treated outdoor in the health centres and subcentres of the CD Block.

Bari Block Primary Health Centre, with 15 beds at Bari, is the major government medical facility in the Manbazar II CD block. There are primary health centres at Ankro (with 4 beds), Dighi (with 4 beds), Jamtoria (with 2 beds) and Basantapur (with 10 beds).
