= Manbazar I =

- Community development block
- Interactive map of Manbazar I
- Coordinates: 23.0615°N 86.6642°E
- Country: India
- State: West Bengal
- District: Purulia

Government
  - Type: Community development block

Area
  - Total: 381.32 km^{2} (147.23 sq mi)
- Elevation: 236 m (774 ft)

Population (2011)
  - Total: 154,071
  - Density: 404.05/km^{2} (1,046.5/sq mi)

Languages
  - Official: Bengali, Santali, English
- Time zone: UTC+5:30 (IST)
- PIN: 723131 (Manbazar)
- Telephone/STD code: 03253
- ISO 3166 code: IN-WB
- Vehicle registration: WB-80, WB-56
- Literacy: 63.78%
- Lok Sabha constituency: Purulia
- Vidhan Sabha constituency: Manbazar
- Website: purulia.gov.in

Manbazar I is a community development block (CD block) that forms an administrative division in the Manbazar subdivision of the Purulia district in the Indian state of West Bengal.

== History ==
=== Background ===
The Jaina Bhagavati-Sutra of the 5th century AD mentions that Purulia was one of the sixteen mahajanapadas and was a part of the kingdom known as Vajra-bhumi in ancient times. In 1833, Manbhum district was carved out of the Jungle Mahals district, with headquarters at Manbazar. In 1838, the headquarters was transferred to Purulia. After independence, when Manbhum district was a part of Bihar, efforts were made to impose Hindi on the Bengali-speaking majority of the district and it led to the Bengali Language Movement (Manbhum). In 1956, the Manbhum district was partitioned between Bihar and West Bengal under the States Reorganization Act and the Bihar and West Bengal (Transfer of Territories) Act 1956.

=== Maoist activities ===
Manbazar, along with certain other areas such as Banduan, Jhalda, and Jaipur were part of the area of violent activities by the Maoists, also referred to as Naxalites.

=== Red corridor ===
106 districts spanning 10 states across India, described as being part of the left wing extremism activities, constitutes the Red corridor. In West Bengal the districts of Paschim Medinipur, Bankura, Purulia and Birbhum are part of the Red corridor. However, as of July 2016, there had been no reported incidents of Maoist related activities from these districts for the previous 4 years.

The CPI (Maoist) extremism affected CD blocks in the Purulia district were: Jhalda I, Jhalda II, Arsha, Baghmundi, Balarampur, Barabazar, Manbazar II and Bandwan. Certain reports also included the Manbazar I and Joypur CD blocks and some times indicted the whole of Purulia district.

The Lalgarh movement, which started attracting attention after the failed assassination attempt on Buddhadeb Bhattacharjee, then chief minister of West Bengal, in the Salboni area of the Paschim Medinipur district, on 2 November 2008 and the police action that followed, had also spread over to these areas. The movement was not just a political struggle but an armed struggle that concurrently took the look of a social struggle. A large number of CPI (M) activists were killed. Although the epi-centre of the movement was Lalgarh, it was spread across 19 police stations in three adjoining districts – Paschim Medinipur, Bankura and Purulia, all thickly forested and near the border with Jharkhand. The deployment of CRPF and other forces started on 11 June 2009. The movement came to an end after the 2011 state assembly elections and change of government in West Bengal. The death of Kishenji, the Maoist commander, on 24 November 2011, was the last major landmark.

== Geography ==
CD blocks in Purulia district

Manbazar is located at 23°03′41″N 86°39′51″E.

The Manbazar I CD block is located in the eastern part of the district. The Kangsabati River flows through the CD block in to the Kangsabati Reservoir. The lower Kangsabati basin has degraded lowlands.

The Manbazar I CD block is bounded by the Puncha CD block on the north, the Hirbandh CD block, in the Bankura district, on the east, the Manbazar II CD block on the south and the Barabazar CD block on the west.

The Manbazar I CD block has an area of 381.32 km^{2}. It has 1 panchayat samity, 10 gram panchayats, 114 gram sansads, 244 mouzas, 219 inhabited villages and one census town. Manbazar, Kenda (partly) and Puncha (partly) police stations serve this CD block. Headquarters of this CD block are at Manbazar.

The Kangsabati Project has submerged large areas of the Purulia district in the Manbazar area.

Gram panchayats of the Manbazar I CD block/ panchayat samiti are: Baramasya-Ramnagar, Bamni-Majhihira, Bhalubasa, Bisri, Chandra-Pairachali, Dhanara, Gopalnagar, Jitujuri, Kamta-Jangidiri and Manbazar.

== Demographics ==
=== Population ===
According to the 2011 Census of India the Manbazar I CD block had a total population of 154,071, of which 144,550 were rural and 9,521 were urban. There were 78,039 (51%) males and 76,032 (49%) females. There were 19,777 persons in the age range of 0 to 6 years. The Scheduled Castes numbered 34,575 (22.44%) and the Scheduled Tribes numbered 33,942 (22.03%).

According to the 2001 census, the Manbazar I CD block had a total population of 127,609, out of which 64,310 were males and 63,299 were females. The Manbazar I CD block registered a population growth of 8.56 per cent during the 1991-2001 decade. Decadal growth for the Purulia district was 13.96 per cent. Decadal growth in West Bengal was 17.84 per cent.

Census Towns in the Manbazar I CD block are (2011 census figures in brackets): Manbazar (9,521).

Large villages (with 4,000+ population) in the Manbazar I CD block are (2011 census figures in brackets): Jitujori (4,339).

Other villages in the Manbazar I CD block are (2011 census figures in brackets): Kenda (3,803), Bhalubasa (2,789), Bamni (2,481), Majhihira (2,104), Jangidiri (1,151), Kamta (1,783), Chandra (1,172), Payrachali (1,668), Barmesya (1,169) and Ramnagar (1,103).

=== Literacy ===
According to the 2011 census the total number of literate persons in the Manbazar I CD block was 85,654 (63.78% of the population over 6 years) out of which males numbered 52,481 (77.35% of the male population over 6 years) and females numbered 32,813 (49.38%) of the female population over 6 years). The gender disparity (the difference between female and male literacy rates) was 27.97%.

See also – List of West Bengal districts ranked by literacy rate

Literacy in CD blocks of
Purulia district
Purulia Sadar subdivision
Arsha – 57.48%
Balarampur – 60.40%
Hura – 68.79%
Purulia I – 78.37%
Purulia II – 63.39%
Manbazar subdivision
Barabazar – 63.27
Bandwan – 61.38%
Manbazar I – 63.78%
Manbazar II – 60.27%
Puncha – 68.14%
Jhalda subdivision
Baghmundi – 57.17%
Jhalda I – 66.18%
Jhalda II – 54.76%
Joypur – 57.94%
Raghunathpur subdivision
Para – 65.62%
Raghunathpur I – 67.36%
Raghunathpur II – 67.29%
Neturia – 65.14%
Santuri – 64.15%
Kashipur – 71.06%
2011 Census: CD Block Wise

Primary Census Abstract Data

=== Language and religion ===
Religion in Manbazar I CD block (2011)
Hinduism	85.62%
Other (tribal religion)	10.99%
Islam	3.06%
Other or not stated	0.33%

In the 2011 census Hindus numbered 131,921 and formed 85.62% of the population in the Manbazar I CD block. Muslims numbered 4,719 and formed 3.06% of the population. Others numbered 17,431 and formed 11.31% of the population. Others include Addi Bassi, Marang Boro, Santal, Saranath, Sari Dharma, Sarna, Alchchi, Bidin, Sant, Saevdharm, Seran, Saran, Sarin, Kheria, and other religious communities. In 2001, Hindus were 86.08%, Muslims 2.89% and tribal religions 10.95% of the population respectively.

Languages of Manbazar I CD block (2011)
1. Bengali (87.5%)
2. Santali (12.3%)
3. Others (0.27%)

At the time of the 2011 census, 87.47% of the population spoke Bengali and 12.26% Santali as their first language.

== Rural Poverty ==
According to the Rural Household Survey in 2005, 32.85% of total number of families were BPL families in Purulia district. According to a World Bank report, as of 2012, 31-38% of the population in Purulia, Murshidabad and Uttar Dinajpur districts were below poverty level, the highest among the districts of West Bengal, which had an average 20% of the population below poverty line.

== Economy ==
=== Livelihood ===
Livelihood
in Manbazar I CD block
1. Cultivators (18.8%)
2. Agricultural labourers (59.1%)
3. Household industries (2.88%)
4. Other Workers (19.2%)

In the Manbazar I CD block in 2011, among the class of total workers, cultivators numbered 13,914 and formed 18.83%, agricultural labourers numbered 43,646 and formed 59.08%, household industry workers numbered 2,125 and formed 2.88% and other workers numbered 14,191 and formed 19.21%. Total workers numbered 73,876 and formed 47.95% of the total population, and non-workers numbered 80,195 and formed 52.05% of the population.

Note: In the census records a person is considered a cultivator, if the person is engaged in cultivation/ supervision of land owned by self/government/institution. When a person who works on another person's land for wages in cash or kind or share, is regarded as an agricultural labourer. Household industry is defined as an industry conducted by one or more members of the family within the household or village, and one that does not qualify for registration as a factory under the Factories Act. Other workers are persons engaged in some economic activity other than cultivators, agricultural labourers and household workers. It includes factory, mining, plantation, transport and office workers, those engaged in business and commerce, teachers, entertainment artistes and so on.

=== Infrastructure ===
There are 219 inhabited villages in the Manbazar I CD block, as per the District Census Handbook, Puruliya, 2011. 100% villages have power supply. 218 villages (99.54%) have drinking water supply. 27 villages (12.33%) have post offices. 175 villages (79.91%) have telephones (including landlines, public call offices and mobile phones). 60 villages (27.54%) have pucca (paved) approach roads and 55 villages (25.11%) have transport communication (includes bus service, rail facility and navigable waterways). 4 villages (1.83%) have agricultural credit societies and 9 villages (4.11%) have banks.

=== Agriculture ===
In 2013–14, persons engaged in agriculture in the Manbazar I CD block could be classified as follows: bargadars 0.25%, patta (document) holders 3.78%, small farmers (possessing land between 1 and 2 hectares) 6.16%, marginal farmers (possessing land up to 1 hectare) 30.46% and agricultural labourers 59.35%.

In 2013–14, the total area irrigated in the Manbazar I CD block was 7,475.94 hectares, out of which 6,570.72 hectares were by tank water, 40.92 hectares by river lift irrigation, 213.60 hectares by open dug wells and 651.00 hectares by other means.

In 2013–14, the Manbazar I CD block produced 3,542 tonnes of Aman paddy, the main winter crop, from 1,740 hectares, 268 tonnes of wheat from 137 hectares, 346 tonnes of maize from 194 hectares and 6,111 tonnes of potato from 217 hectares. It also produced mustard and til.

=== Banking ===
In 2018–19, the Manbazar I CD block had offices of 3 commercial banks and 4 gramin banks.

=== Backward Regions Grant Fund ===
The Purulia district is listed as a backward region and receives financial support from the Backward Regions Grant Fund. The fund, created by the Government of India, is designed to redress regional imbalances in development. As of 2012, 272 districts across the country were listed under this scheme. The list includes 11 districts of West Bengal.

== Transport ==
In 2013–14, the Manbazar I CD block had 1 ferry service, 6 originating/ terminating bus routes. The nearest railway station was 55 km from the CD block headquarters.

The State Highway 4 running from Jhalda (in the Purulia district) to Digha (in the Purba Medinipur district) and the State Highway 5 running from Rupnarayanpur (in the Bardhaman district) to Junput (in the Purba Medinipur district) pass through this block.

== Education ==
In 2013–14, the Manbazar I CD block had 197 primary schools with 14,017 students, 22 middle schools with 978 students, 3 high schools with 1,289 students and 14 higher secondary schools with 15,248 students. Manbazar I CD Block had 1 general college with 1,855 students, 1 professional/ technical institution with 94 students and 273 institutions with 8,925 students for special and non-formal education.

See also – Education in India

According to the 2011 census, in Manbazar I CD block, amongst the 219 inhabited villages, 48 villages did not have a school, 40 villages had two or more primary schools, 31 villages had at least 1 primary and 1 middle school and 16 villages had at least 1 middle and 1 secondary school.

Manbhum Mahavidyalaya was established in 1986 at Manbazar.

== Culture ==
The ruins of a 12th/13th century Buudheswara Shiva and other temples lie at Budhpur, under Manbazar police station, 6 km (3.7 mi) north of Manbazar town on the road to Hura, on the north bank of the Kangsabati River (locally known as Kasai).

== Healthcare ==
In 2014, the Manbazar I CD block had 1 rural hospital and 2 primary health centres, with total 54 beds and 9 doctors. 8,695 patients were treated indoor and 243,730 patients were treated outdoor in the health centres and subcentres of the CD block.

Manbazar Rural Hospital, with 40 beds at Manbazar, is the major Government medical facility in the Manbazar I CD block. There are primary health centres at Kuda (PO Mohara) (with 4 beds) and Pairachali (with 10 beds).
