= Manbazar =

- Census Town
- Location in West Bengal, India Manbazar (India)
- Coordinates: 23°03′41.4″N 86°39′51.1″E
- Country: India
- State: West Bengal
- District: Purulia

Population (2011)
  - Total: 9,521

Languages
  - Official: Bengali, Santali, English,Hindi
- Time zone: UTC+5:30 (IST)
- PIN: 723131
- Telephone code: 03253
- Vehicle registration: WB 56,WB 80
- Lok Sabha constituency: Purulia
- Vidhan Sabha constituency: Manbazar
- Website: purulia.gov.in

Manbazar is a city in Manbazar I block of Manbazar subdivision of Purulia district in the state of West Bengal, India. The headquarters of Manbazar subdivision are located in Manbazar.

== Geography ==
Places in Manbazar subdivision in Purulia district
CT: census town, R: rural/ urban centre, H: historical/ religious centre
Owing to space constraints in the small map, the actual locations in a larger map may vary slightly

=== Location ===
Manbazar is located at 23°03′41.4″N 86°39′51.1″E.

=== Area overview ===
Purulia district forms the lowest step of the Chota Nagpur Plateau. The general scenario is undulating land with scattered hills. Manbazar subdivision, shown in the map alongside, is located in the eastern part of the district. It is an overwhelmingly rural subdivision with 96.32% of the population living in the rural areas and 3.68% living in the urban areas. There are 3 census towns in the subdivision. The map shows the Kangsabati Project Reservoir. The Mukutmanipur Dam is in Bankura district but the upper portion of the reservoir is in Manbazar subdivision. The remnants of old temples and deities are found in the subdivision also, as in other parts of the district. The subdivision has a very high proportion of Scheduled Castes and Scheduled Tribes. Bandwan CD block has 51.86% ST population, Manbazar II CD block has 48.97% ST population. Manbazar I CD block has 22.03% ST and 22.44% SC. Puncha CD block has 24.74% ST and 14.54 SC. Writing in 1911, H. Coupland, ICS, speaks of the aboriginal races largely predominating in the old Manbhum district. He particularly mentions the Kurmis, Santhals, Bhumij and Bauri.

Note: The map alongside presents some of the notable locations in the subdivision. All places marked in the map are linked in the larger full screen map.

== Demographics ==
Historical population
Year	Pop.	±% p.a.
1869	2,261	—
1872	2,429	+2.42%
2011	9,521	+0.99%

As per 2011 Census of India Manbazar town had a total population of 9,521 of which 4,867 (51%) were males and 4,654 (49%) were females. Population below 6 years was 1,007. The total number of literates in Manbazar was 6,948 (81.61% of the population over 6 years).

== Civic administration ==
=== Sub Division ===
Manbazar subdivision is one of the four subdivisions from Purulia district.SDO and SDPO offices are present in the Manbazar city.

=== Police station ===
Manbazar police station has jurisdiction over a part of the Manbazar I CD block. The area covered is 411.11 km^{2} and the population covered is 153,985.

=== CD block HQ ===
The headquarters of the Manbazar I CD block are located at Manbazar.

== Transport ==
SH 4 running from Jhalda (in Purulia district) to Digha (in Purba Medinipur district) and SH 5 running from Rupnarayanpur (in Bardhaman district) to Junput (in Purba Medinipur district) cross at Manbazar. SBSTC has a bus depot at Manbazar.

== Education ==
Manbhum Mahavidyalaya at Manbazar is affiliated to Sidho Kanho Birsha University. It offers courses in B.Sc. (Hons) in Economics and Computer Science, B.Sc. (General), B.Com (Hons), B.Com (General), B.A. (Hons) in Bengali, English, Santali, History, Geography and Economics, B.A. (General), B.B.A. (Hons).

Manbazar R.M. Institution, Manbazar Girls' High school, Swapan Subrata High School, PDGM High School is present in the Manbazar town.

== Healthcare ==
Manbazar Rural Hospital, with 40 beds, is a major government medical facility in Manbazar I CD block.
