= Puncha (community development block) =

- Community development block
- Coordinates: 23.123°N 86.653°E
- Country: India
- State: West Bengal
- District: Purulia

Government
  - Type: Community development block

Area
  - Total: 330.11 km^{2} (127.46 sq mi)
- Elevation: 236 m (774 ft)

Population (2011)
  - Total: 123,855
  - Density: 375.19/km^{2} (971.75/sq mi)

Languages
  - Official: Bengali, Santali, English
- Time zone: UTC+5:30 (IST)
- PIN: 723151 (Puncha)
- Telephone/STD code: 03253
- ISO 3166 code: IN-WB
- Vehicle registration: WB-55, WB-56
- Literacy: 68.14%
- Lok Sabha constituency: Purulia
- Vidhan Sabha constituency: Manbazar
- Website: purulia.gov.in

Puncha is a community development block (CD block) that forms an administrative division in the Manbazar subdivision of the Purulia district in the Indian state of West Bengal.

== History ==
=== Background ===
The Jaina Bhagavati-Sutra of the 5th century AD mentions that Purulia was one of the 16 mahajanapadas and part of the Vajrabhumi kingdom. In 1833, the Manbhum district was carved out of the Jungle Mahals district, with headquarters at Manbazar. In 1838, the headquarters was transferred to Purulia. After independence, when Manbhum district was a part of Bihar, efforts were made to impose Hindi on the Bengali-speaking majority of the district and it led to the Bengali Language Movement (Manbhum). In 1956, the Manbhum district was partitioned between Bihar and West Bengal under the States Reorganization Act and the Bihar and West Bengal (Transfer of Territories) Act 1956.

== Geography ==
CD blocks in Purulia district

Puncha is located at 23°07′23″N 86°39′11″E.

The Puncha CD block is located in the eastern part of the district. The Kangsabati River forms the boundary between the Puncha and Hura CD blocks. The lower Kangsabati basin has degraded lowlands.

The Puncha CD block is bounded by the Hura CD block on the north, the Hirbandh CD block, in the Bankura district, on the east, the Manbazar I CD block on the south, and the Purulia I CD block on the west.

The Puncha CD block has an area of 330.11 km^{2}. It has 1 panchayat samity, 10 gram panchayats, 97 gram sansads (village councils), 109 mouzas and 99 inhabited villages. Puncha (partly) and Kenda (partly) police stations serve this block. Headquarters of this CD block is at Puncha.

Gram panchayats of the Puncha block/panchayat samiti are: Bagda, Chandra, Chhirudih, Jambad, Kenda, Lakhra, Na-para, Panipathar, Pirrah and Puncha.

== Demographics ==
=== Population ===
According to the 2011 Census of India, the Puncha CD block had a total population of 123,855, all of which were rural. There were 62,676 (51%) males and 61,179 (49%) females. Therewere 16,012 persons in the age range of 0 to 6 years. The Scheduled Castes numbered 18,006 (14.54%) and the Scheduled Tribes numbered 30,641 (24.74%).

According to the 2001 census, the Puncha CD block had a total population of 108,045, out of which 54,636 were males and 53,409 were females. The Puncha CD block registered a population growth of 12.09 per cent during the 1991–2001 decade. Decadal growth for the Purulia district was 13.96 per cent. Decadal growth in West Bengal was 17.84 per cent.

Large villages (with 4,000+ population) in the Puncha CD block are (2011 census figures in brackets): Puncha (5,404) and Pirra (4,049).

Other villages in the Puncha CD block are (2011 census figures in brackets): Laulara (2,473), Jambad (3,776), Chandra (3,884), Chhirudi (2,243), Bagda (2,370), Lakhra (685), Kenda (3,803) and Panipathar (2,118).

=== Literacy ===
According to the 2011 census the total number of literate persons in the Puncha CD block was 73,486 (68.14% of the population over 6 years) out of which males numbered 44,267 (78.37% of the male population over 6 years) and females numbered 29,219 (54.82%) of the female population over 6 years). The gender disparity (the difference between female and male literacy rates) was 26.34%.

See also – List of West Bengal districts ranked by literacy rate

Literacy in CD blocks of
Purulia district
Purulia Sadar subdivision
Arsha – 57.48%
Balarampur – 60.40%
Hura – 68.79%
Purulia I – 78.37%
Purulia II – 63.39%
Manbazar subdivision
Barabazar – 63.27
Bandwan – 61.38%
Manbazar I – 63.78%
Manbazar II – 60.27%
Puncha – 68.14%
Jhalda subdivision
Baghmundi – 57.17%
Jhalda I – 66.18%
Jhalda II – 54.76%
Joypur – 57.94%
Raghunathpur subdivision
Para – 65.62%
Raghunathpur I – 67.36%
Raghunathpur II – 67.29%
Neturia – 65.14%
Santuri – 64.15%
Kashipur – 71.06%
2011 Census: CD Block Wise

Primary Census Abstract Data

=== Language and religion ===
Religion in Puncha CD block (2011)
Hinduism	82.09%
Other (tribal religion)	14.08%
Islam	3.55%
Other or not stated	0.28%

In the 2011 census, Hindus numbered 101,672 and formed 82.09% of the population in the Puncha CD block. Muslims numbered 4,402 and formed 3.55% of the population. Others numbered 17,781 and formed 14.36% of the population. Others include Addi Bassi, Marang Boro, Santal, Saranath, Sari Dharma, Sarna, Alchchi, Bidin, Sant, Saevdharm, Seran, Saran, Sarin, Kheria, and other religious communities. In 2001, Hindus were 82.42%, Muslims 3.50% and tribal religions 13.87% of the population respectively.

Languages of Puncha CD block (2011)
1. Bengali (83.4%)
2. Santali (12.5%)
3. Kurmali (2.74%)
4. Others (1.40%)

At the time of the 2011 census, 83.37% of the population spoke Bengali, 12.49% Santali and 2.74% Kurmali as their first language.

== Rural Poverty ==
According to the Rural Household Survey in 2005, 32.85% of total number of families were BPL families in Purulia district. According to a World Bank report, as of 2012, 31-38% of the population in Purulia, Murshidabad and Uttar Dinajpur districts were below poverty level, the highest among the districts of West Bengal, which had an average 20% of the population below poverty line.

== Economy ==
=== Livelihood ===
Livelihood
in Puncha CD block
1. Cultivators (33.0%)
2. Agricultural labourers (47.6%)
3. Household industries (2.43%)
4. Other Workers (17.0%)

In the Puncha CD block in 2011, among the class of total workers, cultivators numbered 21,480 and formed 33.03%, agricultural labourers numbered 30,933 and formed 47.57%, household industry workers numbered 1,581 and formed 2.43% and other workers numbered 11,037 and formed 16.97%. Total workers numbered 65,031 and formed 52.51% of the total population, and non-workers numbered 58,824 and formed 47.49% of the population.

Note: In the census records a person is considered a cultivator, if the person is engaged in cultivation/ supervision of land owned by self/government/institution. When a person who works on another person's land for wages in cash or kind or share, is regarded as an agricultural labourer. Household industry is defined as an industry conducted by one or more members of the family within the household or village, and one that does not qualify for registration as a factory under the Factories Act. Other workers are persons engaged in some economic activity other than cultivators, agricultural labourers and household workers. It includes factory, mining, plantation, transport and office workers, those engaged in business and commerce, teachers, entertainment artistes and so on.

=== Infrastructure ===
There are 99 inhabited villages in the Puncha CD block, as per the District Census Handbook, Puruliya, 2011. 100% villages have power supply. 100% villages have drinking water supply. 20 villages (20.20%) have post offices. 91 villages (91.92%) have telephones (including landlines, public call offices and mobile phones). 35 villages (35.35%) have pucca (paved) approach roads and 39 villages (39.39%) have transport communication (includes bus service, rail facility and navigable waterways). 9 villages (9.09%) have agricultural credit societies and 6 villages (6.06%) have banks.

=== Agriculture ===
In 2013–14, persons engaged in agriculture in the Puncha CD Block could be classified as follows: bargadars 0.35%, patta (document) holders 6.21%, small farmers (possessing land between 1 and 2 hectares) 6.34%, marginal farmers (possessing land up to 1 hectare) 22.88% and agricultural labourers 64.21%.

In 2013–14, the total area irrigated in the Puncha CD block was 7,192.15 hectares, out of which 6,342.35 hectares by tank water, 70.60 hectares by river lift irrigation, 214.20 hectares by open dug wells and 565.00 hectares by other means.

In 2013–14, the Puncha CD block produced 20 tonnes of Aus paddy, the summer crop, from 14 hectares, 3,103 tonnes of Aman paddy, the main winter crop, from 1,490 hectares, 44 tonnes of wheat from 20 hectares, 443 tonnes of maize from 241 hectares, 215 tonnes of jute from 11 hectares and 3,551 tonnes of potatoes from 119 hectares. It also produced maskalai, khesari, gram, mustard, til and sugarcane. It was the only CD Block in Purulia district to record some production of jute.

=== Banking ===
In 2013–14, the Puncha CD block had offices of 2 commercial bank and 3 gramin banks.

=== Backward Regions Grant Fund ===
The Purulia district is listed as a backward region and receives financial support from the Backward Regions Grant Fund. The fund, created by the Government of India, is designed to redress regional imbalances in development. As of 2012, 272 districts across the country were listed under this scheme. The list includes 11 districts of West Bengal.

== Transport ==
In 2013–14, the Puncha CD block had 7 originating/ terminating bus routes. The nearest railway station was 43 km from CD block headquarters.

== Education ==
In 2013–14, the Puncha CD block had 162 primary schools with 11,064 students, 25 middle schools with 591 students, 9 high schools with 3,417 students and 12 higher secondary schools with 13,225 students. The Puncha CD block had 2 general colleges with 2,224 students and 284 institutions with 8,561 students for special and non-formal education.

See also – Education in India

According to the 2011 census, in Puncha CD block, amongst the 99 inhabited villages, 5 villages did not have a school, 44 villages had two or more primary schools, 35 villages had at least 1 primary and 1 middle school and 24 villages had at least 1 middle and 1 secondary school.

Ramananda Centenary College was established in 1971 at Laulara.

Sitaram Mahato Memorial College was established in 2015 at Kuruktopa.

Ganesh Mahato Memorial Teachers Training Institute (D.Ed) is proposed at Pirra, Kenda, Purulia.

== Culture ==
There are remains of old Jain temples at Pakbirra.

There are remains of another old Shiva temple at Kanara (কানড়া).

== Healthcare ==
In 2014, the Puncha CD Block had one block primary health centre and three primary health centres, with a total of 52 beds and 8 doctors. 5,018 patients were treated indoor and 214,312 patients were treated outdoor in the hospitals, health centres and subcentres of the CD block.

Puncha Rural Hospital, with 30 beds at Puncha, is the major government medical facility in the Puncha CD block. There are primary health centres at Bagda (with 10 beds), Nowagarh (PO Raj Nowagarh) (with 6 beds) and Anandadwip (Kuruktopa) (with 2 beds)
