= Barabazar (community development block) =

- Community development block
- Coordinates: 23°01′54.5″N 86°21′31.5″E
- Country: India
- State: West Bengal
- District: Purulia
- Parliamentary constituency: Jhargram
- Assembly constituency: Bandwan

Area
  - Total: 161.41 sq mi (418.06 km^{2})
- Elevation: 751 ft (229 m)

Population (2011)
  - Total: 170,569
  - Density: 1,056.7/sq mi (408.00/km^{2})

Languages
  - Official: Bengali, Santali, English
- Time zone: UTC+5.30 (IST)
- PIN: 723127 (Barabhum)
- Telephone/STD code: 03253
- Vehicle registration: WB-55, WB-56
- Literacy Rate: 63.27%
- Website: purulia.gov.in

Barabazar is a community development block (CD block) that forms an administrative division in the Manbazar subdivision of the Purulia district in the Indian state of West Bengal.

== History ==
=== Background ===
The Jaina Bhagavati-Sutra of the 5th century AD mentions that Purulia was one of the sixteen mahajanapadas and was a part of the kingdom known as Vajra-bhumi in ancient times. In 1833, the Manbhum district was carved out of the Jungle Mahals district, with headquarters at Manbazar. In 1838, the headquarters was transferred to Purulia. After independence, when Manbhum district was a part of Bihar, efforts were made to impose Hindi on the Bengali-speaking majority of the district and it led to the Bengali Language Movement (Manbhum). In 1956, the Manbhum district was partitioned between Bihar and West Bengal under the States Reorganization Act and the Bihar and West Bengal (Transfer of Territories) Act 1956.

=== Red corridor ===
106 districts spanning 10 states across India, described as being part of the left wing extremism activities, constitutes the Red corridor. In West Bengal the districts of Paschim Medinipur, Bankura, Purulia and Birbhum are part of the Red corridor. However, as of July 2016, there had been no reported incidents of Maoist related activities from these districts for the previous 4 years.

The CPI (Maoist) extremism affected CD blocks in Purulia district were: Jhalda I, Jhalda II, Arsha, Baghmundi, Balarampur, Barabazar, Manbazar II and Bandwan. Certain reports also included Manbazar I and Joypur CD Blocks and some times indicted the whole of Purulia district.

The Lalgarh movement, which started attracting attention after the failed assassination attempt on Buddhadeb Bhattacharjee, then chief minister of West Bengal, in the Salboni area of the Paschim Medinipur district, on 2 November 2008 and the police action that followed, had also spread over to these areas. The movement was not just a political struggle but an armed struggle that concurrently took the look of a social struggle. A large number of CPI (M) activists were killed. Although the epi-centre of the movement was Lalgarh, it was spread across 19 police stations in three adjoining districts – Paschim Medinipur, Bankura and Purulia, all thickly forested and near the border with Jharkhand. The deployment of CRPF and other forces started on 11 June 2009. The movement came to an end after the 2011 state assembly elections and change of government in West Bengal. The death of Kishenji, the Maoist commander, on 24 November 2011 was the last major landmark.

== Geography ==
CD blocks in Purulia district

Barabazar is located at 23°01′54.5″N 86°21′31.3″E.

The Barabazar CD block is located in the southern part of the district. The Bagmundi-Bandwan uplands is an area that has descended from the Ranchi Plateau.

The Barabazar CD block is bounded by the Arsha and Purulia I CD blocks on the north, the Manbazar I and Manbazar II CD blocks on the east, the Boram and Patamda CD blocks, in the East Singhbhum district of Jharkhand, on the south and the Balarampur CD block on the west.

The Barabazar CD block has an area of 418.06 km^{2}. It has 1 panchayat samity, 10 gram panchayats, 122 gram sansads (village councils), 215 mouzas, 202 inhabited villages and 1 census town. Barabazar police station serves this block. Headquarters of this CD block is at Barabazar.

Gram panchayats of the Barabazar block/panchayat samiti are: Baghbandh, Banjora, Bansbera, Barabazar, Berada, Dhelat-Bamu, Latpada, Sindri, Sukurhutu and Tumrasole.

== Demographics ==
=== Population ===
According to the 2011 Census of India, the Barabazar CD block had a total population of 170,569, of which 162,508 were rural and 8,056 were urban. There were 86,353 (51%) males and 64,211 (49%) females. There were 23,844 persons in the age range of 0 to 6 years. The Scheduled Castes numbered 12,599 (7.39%) and the Scheduled Tribes numbered 33,096 (19.40%).

According to the 2001 census, the Barabazar block had a total population of 146,917, out of which 74,234 were males and 72,683 were females. The Barabazar block registered a population growth of 13.60 per cent during the 1991-2001 decade. Decadal growth for the Purulia district was 13.96 per cent. Decadal growth in West Bengal was 17.84 per cent.

Census towns in the Barabazar CD block are (2011 census figures in brackets): Barabazar (8,056).

Villages in the Barabazar CD block are (2011 census figures in brackets): Sindri (3,972), Banjora (1,903), Sukurhutu (1,760), Berada (2,706), Latpada (2,016), Dhelatbamu (451) and Tumrashou (1,399).

=== Literacy ===
According to the 2011 census the total number of literates in Barabazar CD block was 92,837 (63.27% of the population over 6 years) out of which males numbered 57,752 (77.84% of the male population over 6 years) and females numbered 35,085 (48.37%) of the female population over 6 years). The gender disparity (the difference between female and male literacy rates) was 29.47%.

See also – List of West Bengal districts ranked by literacy rate

Literacy in CD blocks of
Purulia district
Purulia Sadar subdivision
Arsha – 57.48%
Balarampur – 60.40%
Hura – 68.79%
Purulia I – 78.37%
Purulia II – 63.39%
Manbazar subdivision
Barabazar – 63.27
Bandwan – 61.38%
Manbazar I – 63.78%
Manbazar II – 60.27%
Puncha – 68.14%
Jhalda subdivision
Baghmundi – 57.17%
Jhalda I – 66.18%
Jhalda II – 54.76%
Joypur – 57.94%
Raghunathpur subdivision
Para – 65.62%
Raghunathpur I – 67.36%
Raghunathpur II – 67.29%
Neturia – 65.14%
Santuri – 64.15%
Kashipur – 71.06%
2011 Census: CD Block Wise

Primary Census Abstract Data

=== Language and religion ===
Religion in Barabazar CD block (2011)
Hinduism	87.21%
Other (tribal religion)	8.02%
Islam	4.51%
Other or not stated	0.26%

In the 2011 census Hindus numbered 148,757 and formed 87.21% of the population in the Barabazar CD block. Muslims numbered 7,689 and formed 4.51% of the population. Others numbered 14,118 and formed 8.28% of the population. Others include Addi Bassi, Marang Boro, Santal, Saranath, Sari Dharma, Sarna, Alchchi, Bidin, Sant, Saevdharm, Seran, Saran, Sarin, Kheria, and other religious communities. In 2001, Hindus were 88.90%, Muslims 4.40% and tribal religions 6.53% of the population respectively.

Languages of Barabazar CD block (2011)
1. Bengali (89.7%)
2. Santali (9.04%)
3. Others (1.24%)

At the time of the 2011 census, 89.72% of the population spoke Bengali and 9.04% Santali as their first language.

== Rural Poverty ==
According to the Rural Household Survey in 2005, 32.85% of total number of families were BPL families in Purulia district. According to a World Bank report, as of 2012, 31-38% of the population in Purulia, Murshidabad and Uttar Dinajpur districts were below poverty level, the highest among the districts of West Bengal, which had an average 20% of the population below poverty line.

== Economy ==
=== Livelihood ===
Livelihood
in Barabazar CD block
1. Cultivators (28.6%)
2. Agricultural labourers (50.0%)
3. Household industries (2.89%)
4. Other Workers (18.5%)

In the Barabazar CD block in 2011, among the class of total workers, cultivators numbered 24,110 and formed 28.60%, agricultural labourers numbered 42,185 and formed 50.04%, household industry workers numbered 2,436 and formed 2.89% and other workers numbered 15,573 and formed 18.47%. Total workers numbered 84,304 and formed 49.43% of the total population, and non-workers numbered 86,260 and formed 50.57% of the population.

Note: In the census records a person is considered a cultivator, if the person is engaged in cultivation/ supervision of land owned by self/government/institution. When a person who works on another person's land for wages in cash or kind or share, is regarded as an agricultural labourer. Household industry is defined as an industry conducted by one or more members of the family within the household or village, and one that does not qualify for registration as a factory under the Factories Act. Other workers are persons engaged in some economic activity other than cultivators, agricultural labourers and household workers. It includes factory, mining, plantation, transport and office workers, those engaged in business and commerce, teachers, entertainment artistes and so on.

=== Infrastructure ===
There are 202 inhabited villages in the Barabazar CD block, as per the District Census Handbook, Puruliya, 2011. 100% villages have power supply. 195 villages (96.53%) have drinking water supply. 19 villages (19.41%) have post offices. 176 villages (87.16%) have telephones (including landlines, public call offices and mobile phones). 53 villages (26.24%) have pucca (paved) approach roads and 73 villages (36.14%) have transport communication (includes bus service, rail facility and navigable waterways). 10 villages (4.95%) have agricultural credit societies and 8 villages (3.96%) have banks.

=== Agriculture ===
In 2013–14, persons engaged in agriculture in the Barabazar CD block could be classified as follows: bargadars 0.33%, patta (document) holders 12.94%, small farmers (possessing land between 1 and 2 hectares) 7.24%, marginal farmers (possessing land up to 1 hectare) 23.52% and agricultural labourers 55.98%.

In 2013–14, the total area irrigated in the Barabazar CD block was 8,911.82 hectares, out of which 6,297.81 hectares was by canal irrigation, 1,419.05 hectares by tank water, 112.86 hectares by river lift irrigation, 149.20 hectares by open dug wells and 302.90 hectares by other means.

In 2013–14, the Barabazar CD block produced 109 tonnes of Aus paddy, the summer crop, from 78 hectares, 64,087 tonnes of Aman paddy, the main winter crop, from 27,788 hectares, 204 tonnes of Boro paddy, the spring crop, from 71 hectares, 45 tonnes of wheat from 25 hectares, 2,105 tonnes of maize from 1,347 hectares and 1,155 tonnes of potato from 59 hectares. It also produced maskalai and mustard.

=== Banking ===
In 2013–14, the Barabazar CD block had offices of 6 commercial banks and 2 gramin banks.

=== Backward Regions Grant Fund ===
The Purulia district is listed as a backward region and receives financial support from the Backward Regions Grant Fund. The fund, created by the Government of India, is designed to redress regional imbalances in development. As of 2012, 272 districts across the country were listed under this scheme. The list includes 11 districts of West Bengal.

== Transport ==
In 2013–14, the Barabazar CD block had 8 originating/ terminating bus routes. The nearest railway station was 19 km from the CD block headquarters.

The State Highway 4 running from Jhalda (in the Purulia district) to Junput (in the Purba Medinipur district) pass through this block.

== Education ==
In 2013–14, the Barabazar CD block had 203 primary schools with 17,840 students, 34 middle schools with 1,204 students, 3 high schools with 1,072 students and 16 higher secondary schools with 17,357 students. Barabazar CD block had 1 general college with 862 students and 265 institutions with 10,677 students for special and non-formal education.

See also – Education in India

According to the 2011 census, in Barabazar CD block, amongst the 202 inhabited villages, 15 villages did not have a school, 43 villages had two or more primary schools, 59 villages had at least 1 primary and 1 middle school and 20 villages had at least 1 middle and 1 secondary school.

Barabazar Bikram Tudu Memorial College was established in 2006 at Barabazar.

*New Integrated Govt. School* is a newly constructed co-educational school with hostel facility under BRGF Scheme that has been planned to be run from Class- I to Class- XII, i.e., from Primary to Higher Secondary grades. The school is located at the rural area of Baramukru village under Barabazar Development Block in Purulia district, West Bengal. The official year of establishment of the school is 2019. At present, the classes that are running include Class- I Class- II, Class- V and Class- VI and the medium of instruction is English.

== Healthcare ==
In 2014, the Barabazar CD block had 1 block primary health centre and 2 primary health centres, with total 50 beds and 7 doctors. 6,498 patients were treated indoor and 184,677 patients were treated outdoor in the health centres and subcentres of the CD Block.

Barabazar Rural Hospital, with 30 beds at Barabazar, is the major government medical facility in the Barabazar CD block. There are primary health centres at Sindhri (with 10 beds) and Bamundiha (with 4 beds).
