= Junput =

- Village
- Location in West Bengal, India Junput (India)
- Coordinates: 21.724767°N 87.811981°E
- Country: India
- State: West Bengal
- District: Purba Medinipur

Languages
  - Official: Bengali, English
- Time zone: UTC+5:30 (IST)
- PIN: 721450 (Junput Sub Post Office)
- Lok Sabha constituency: Kanthi
- Vidhan Sabha constituency: Kanthi Uttar
- Website: purbamedinipur.gov.in

Junput is a village in Deshapran CD Block in Contai subdivision of Purba Medinipur district in the state of West Bengal, India.

== Geography ==
Cities and towns in Contai subdivision of Purba Medinipur district
M: municipal city/ town, CT: census town, R: rural/ urban centre, H: historical/ religious centre, S: port, sea-beach
Owing to space constraints in the small map, the actual locations in a larger map may vary slightly

== Demographics ==
In the District Census Handbook for Purba Medinipur, the terminus of State Highway 5, which is elsewhere mentioned as Junput, is shown in village no. 383 Dakshin Kadua. Junput is part of Dakshin Kadua in census records.

As per the 2011 Census of India, Dakshin Kadua had a total population of 1,131 of which 611 (54%) were males and 520 (46%) were females. Population below 6 years was 984. The total number of literates in Dakshin Kadua was 905 (91.97% of the population over 6 years).

== Tourism ==
Junput is a tourist centre. A dry fish centre.

== Transport ==
State Highway 5 starting from Rupnarayanpur (in Paschim Bardhaman district) terminates at Junput.
