= State Highway 4 (West Bengal) =

Road in West Bengal, India

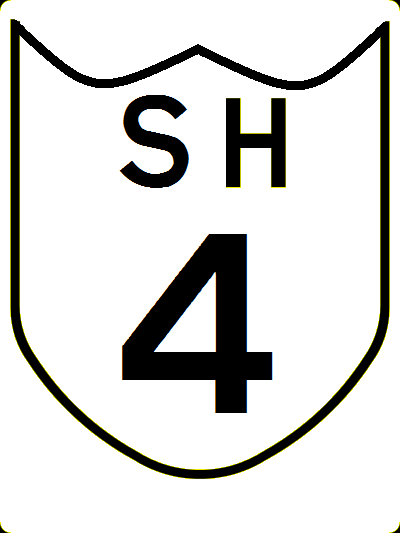
State Highway 4

Route information
- Length: 466 km (290 mi)

Major junctions
- From: SH 4A at Jhalda
- NH 18 at Balarampur; SH 5 at Manbazar; SH 2 from Hatirampur to Khatra; SH 9 from Raipur Bazar to Pirolgari more; NH 14 at Chandrakona Road; SH 7 from Chandrakona to Khirpai; NH 16 at Panskura; NH 116 at Tamluk (Radhamoni); Mecheda-Tamluk-Haldia Road at Tamluk; NH 116B at Nandakumar; Chandipur-Nandigram Road at Math Chandipur; Egra-Bhagabanpur-Bajkul Road at Bajkul; Lalat-Janka Road at Henria; SH 5 at Contai; Egra-Ramnagar Road at Ramnagar
- To: SH 57 (Odisha) at Digha

Location
- Country: India
- State: West Bengal
- Districts: Purulia, Bankura, Paschim Medinipur, Purba Medinipur

Highway system
- Roads in India; Expressways; National; State; Asian; State Highways in West Bengal

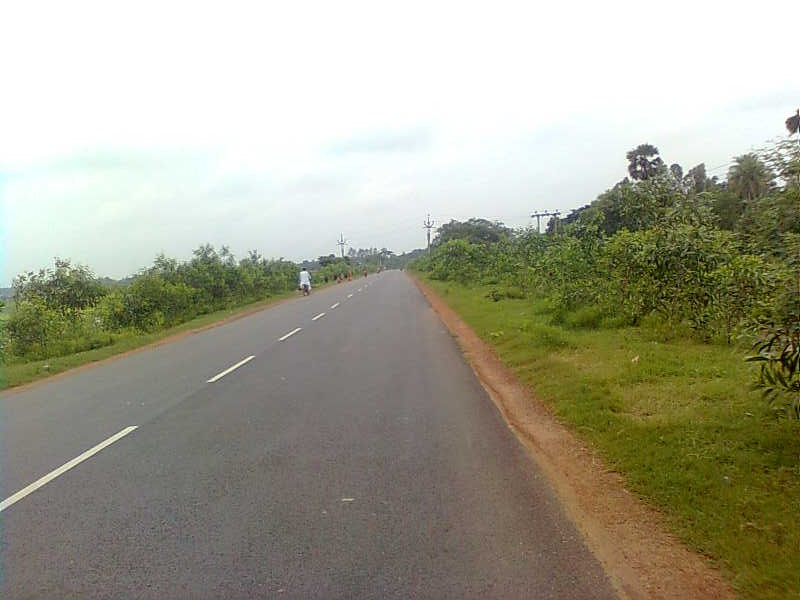
Contai Mecheda Road, part of SH 4

State Highway 4 (SH 4) is a state highway in West Bengal, India.

== Route ==
SH 4 originates from Jhalda at the junction with SH 4A and passes through Baghmundi, Balarampur, Barabazar, Barabhum, Sindri, Manbazar, Khatra, Raipur Bazar, Sarenga, Pingboni, Goaltore, Nayabasat, Chandrakona Road, Chandrakona, Khirpai, Ghatal, Daspur, Panskura, Tamluk, Nandakumar, Math Chandipur, Kismat Bajkul, Brajalalchak, Khejuri, Marishda, Daisai, Contai, Bara Bankuya, Ramnagar and terminates at Digha at the crossing with SH 57 (Odisha) near Old Digha Sea Beach.It is the longest State Highway in West Bengal.

The total length of SH 4 is 466 kilometres (290 mi).

Districts traversed by SH 4 are:
Purulia district (0 - 115 km)
Bankura district (115 - 195 km)
Paschim Medinipur (195 - 303 km)
Purba Medinipur (303 - 466 km)

Rivers crossed by SH 4 are: Kangsabati, Haldi, Silabati

== Road sections ==
It is divided into different sections as follows:

Road section	District	CD Block	Length (km)
Jhalda-Baghmundi-Balarampur	Purulia	Jhalda I, Baghmundi, Balarampur	62
Balarampur-Barabhum-Sidn-Manbazar-Bansa	Purulia	Barabazar, Manbazar I	53
Bansa-Khatra	Bankura	Hirbandh, Khatra	18
Khatra-Kanchendaghat	Bankura		21
Kachendaghat-Raipur	Bankura	Raipur	25
Raipur-Simlighat-Sarenga	Bankura	Sarenga	16
Sarenga-Goaltore-Chandrakona	Paschim Medinipur	Garhbeta II, Garhbeta III, Chandrakona II	29
Chandrakona-Ghatal	Paschim Medinipur	Chandrakona I, Ghatal	45
Ghatal-Panskura	Paschim Medinipur	Daspur I	34
Panskura-Tamluk	Purba Medinipur	Panskura I, Tamluk	69
Tamluk-Contai-Digha	Purba Medinipur	Nandakumar, Chandipur, Bhagabanpur II, Khejuri I, Contai III, Contai I, Ramnagar II, Ramnagar I	84
Contai Bypass	Purba Medinipur		3
Digha Foreshore	Purba Medinipur		7

== See also ==
- List of state highways in West Bengal
