= Jhalda I =

- Community development block
- Coordinates: 23°15′20″N 85°53′11″E
- Country: India
- State: West Bengal
- District: Purulia
- Parliamentary constituency: Purulia
- Assembly constituency: Baghmundi

Area
  - Total: 315.09 km^{2} (121.66 sq mi)
- Elevation: 249 m (817 ft)

Population (2011)
  - Total: 137,143
  - Density: 435.25/km^{2} (1,127.3/sq mi)
- Time zone: UTC+5.30 (IST)
- PIN: 723202 (Jhalda)
- Telephone/STD code: 03254
- Vehicle registration: WB-55, WB-56
- Literacy Rate: 66.18 per cent
- Website: http://purulia.gov.in/

Jhalda I is a community development block (CD block) that forms an administrative division in the Jhalda subdivision of the Purulia district in the Indian state of West Bengal.

== History ==
=== Background ===
The Jaina Bhagavati-Sutra of the 5th century AD mentions that Purulia was one of the sixteen mahajanapadas and was a part of the kingdom known as Vajra-bhumi in ancient times. In 1833, the Manbhum district was carved out of Jungle Mahals district, with headquarters at Manbazar. In 1838, the headquarters was transferred to Purulia. After independence, when Manbhum district was a part of Bihar, efforts were made to impose Hindi on the Bengali-speaking majority of the district and it led to the Bengali Language Movement (Manbhum). In 1956, the Manbhum district was partitioned between Bihar and West Bengal under the States Reorganization Act and the Bihar and West Bengal (Transfer of Territories) Act 1956.

=== Red corridor ===
106 districts spanning 10 states across India, described as being part of the left wing extremism activities, constitutes the Red corridor. In West Bengal the districts of Paschim Medinipur, Bankura, Purulia and Birbhum are part of the Red corridor. However, as of July 2016, there had been no reported incidents of Maoist related activities from these districts for the previous 4 years.

The CPI (Maoist) extremism affected CD Blocks in Purulia district were: Jhalda I, Jhalda II, Arsha, Baghmundi, Balarampur, Barabazar, Manbazar II and Bandwan. Certain reports also included Manbazar I and Joypur CD Blocks and some times indicted the whole of Purulia district.

The Lalgarh movement, which started attracting attention after the failed assassination attempt on Buddhadeb Bhattacharjee, then chief minister of West Bengal, in the Salboni area of the Paschim Medinipur district, on 2 November 2008 and the police action that followed, had also spread over to these areas. The movement was not just a political struggle but an armed struggle that concurrently took the look of a social struggle. A large number of CPI (M) activists were killed. Although the epi-centre of the movement was Lalgarh, it was spread across 19 police stations in three adjoining districts – Paschim Medinipur, Bankura and Purulia, all thickly forested and near the border with Jharkhand. The deployment of CRPF and other forces started on 11 June 2009. The movement came to an end after the 2011 state assembly elections and change of government in West Bengal. The death of Kishenji, the Maoist commander, on 24 November 2011 was the last major landmark.

== Geography ==
CD blocks in Purulia district

Pusti, a constituent panchayat of Jhalda I block, is located at 23°15′20″N 85°53′11″E.

The Jhalda I CD block is located in the south-western part of the district. The Subarnarekha forms the inter-state boundary between West Bengal and Jharkhand in the Jhalda I CD block and a small portion of the Bahgmundi CD block.

The Jhalda I CD block is bounded by the Kasmar and Jaridih CD blocks, in the Bokaro district of Jharkhand, on the north, the Jhalda II CD block on the east, the Baghmundi CD block and Kukru CD block, in Seraikela Kharsawan district of Jharkhand on the south, and the Sonahatu and Silli CD blocks, in the Ranchi district of Jharkhand, and the Gola CD block, in the Ramgarh district of Jharkhand, on the west.

The Jhalda I CD block has an area of 315.09 km^{2}. It has 1 panchayat samity, 10 gram panchayats, 97 gram sansads (village councils), 143 mouzas, 131 inhabited villages and 1 census town. Jhalda police station serves this block. Headquarters of this CD Block is at Masina.

Gram panchayats of the Jhalda I block/panchayat samiti are: Hensahatu, Ichag, Iloo-Jargo, Jhalda-Darda, Kalma, Maru-Mosina, Mathari-Khamar, Nayadih, Pusti and Tulin.

== Demographics ==
=== Population ===
According to the 2011 Census of India, the Jhalda I CD block had a total population of 137,143, of which 127,759 were rural and 9,384 were urban. There were 70,095 (51%) males and 67,048 (49%) females. There were 20,832 persons in the age range of 0 to 6 years. The Scheduled Castes numbered 16,988 (12.39%) and the Scheduled Tribes numbered 15,608 (11.38%).

As per the 2001 census, the Jhalda I CD block had a total population of 115,493, out of which 58,611 were males and 56,882 were females. The Jhalda I CD block registered a population growth of 16.75 per cent during the 1991-2001 decade. Decadal growth for the Purulia district was 13.96 per cent. Decadal growth in West Bengal was 17.84 per cent.

Large villages (with 4,000+ population) in the Jhalda I CD block are (2011 census figures in brackets): Tulin (9,844), Ichag (4,951) and Jargo (4,083).

Other villages in the Jhalda I CD block are (2011 census figures in brackets): Pusti (2,374), Kalma (2,536), Ilu (3,131), Khamar (1,799), Masina (2,724), Danrda (1,675), Uhatu (660) and Nayadi (1,246).

Jhalda, a municipal town, is included as a census town in the 2011 census figures. It is not included here as a census town.

=== Literacy ===
According to the 2011 census, the total number of literates in the Jhalda I CD block was 76,973 (66.18% of the population over 6 years) out of which males numbered 47,591 (80.15% of the male population over 6 years) and females numbered 29,382 (51.61%) of the female population over 6 years). The gender disparity (the difference between female and male literacy rates) was 28.54%.

See also – List of West Bengal districts ranked by literacy rate

Literacy in CD blocks of
Purulia district
Purulia Sadar subdivision
Arsha – 57.48%
Balarampur – 60.40%
Hura – 68.79%
Purulia I – 78.37%
Purulia II – 63.39%
Manbazar subdivision
Barabazar – 63.27
Bandwan – 61.38%
Manbazar I – 63.78%
Manbazar II – 60.27%
Puncha – 68.14%
Jhalda subdivision
Baghmundi – 57.17%
Jhalda I – 66.18%
Jhalda II – 54.76%
Joypur – 57.94%
Raghunathpur subdivision
Para – 65.62%
Raghunathpur I – 67.36%
Raghunathpur II – 67.29%
Neturia – 65.14%
Santuri – 64.15%
Kashipur – 71.06%
2011 Census: CD Block Wise

Primary Census Abstract Data

=== Language and religion ===
Religion in Jhalda I CD block (2011)
Hinduism	83.59%
Islam	8.48%
Other (tribal religion)	7.83%
Other or not stated	0.42%

In the 2011 census, the Hindus numbered 114,769 and formed 83.69% of the population in the Jhalda I CD block. Muslims numbered 11,627 and formed 8.48% of the population. Others numbered 10,747 and formed 7.83% of the population. Others include Addi Bassi, Marang Boro, Santal, Saranath, Sari Dharma, Sarna, Alchchi, Bidin, Sant, Saevdharm, Seran, Saran, Sarin, Kheria, and other religious communities. In 2001, Hindus were 86.28%, Muslims 7.68% and tribal religions 5.60% of the population respectively.

Languages of Jhalda I CD block (2011)
1. Bengali (59.6%)
2. Kurmali (35.5%)
3. Urdu (2.21%)
4. Hindi (1.25%)
5. Santali (1.02%)
6. Others (0.42%)

At the time of the 2011 census, 59.56% of the population spoke Bengali, 35.54% Kurmali, 2.21% Urdu, 1.25% Hindi and 1.02% Santali as their first language.

== Rural Poverty ==
According to the Rural Household Survey in 2005, 32.85% of total number of families were BPL families in Purulia district. According to a World Bank report, as of 2012, 31-38% of the population in Purulia, Murshidabad and Uttar Dinajpur districts were below poverty level, the highest among the districts of West Bengal, which had an average 20% of the population below poverty line.

== Economy ==
=== Livelihood ===
Livelihood
in Jhalda I CD block
1. Cultivators (30.4%)
2. Agricultural labourers (35.2%)
3. Household industries (9.91%)
4. Other Workers (24.5%)

In the Jhalda I CD block in 2011, among the class of total workers, cultivators numbered 17,082 and formed 30.38%, agricultural labourers numbered 19,776 and formed 35.18%, household industry workers numbered 5,572 and formed 9.91% and other workers numbered 13,789 and formed 24.53%. Total workers numbered 56,219 and formed 40.99% of the total population, and non-workers numbered 80,924 and formed 59.01% of the population.

Note: In the census records a person is considered a cultivator, if the person is engaged in cultivation/ supervision of land owned by self/government/institution. When a person who works on another person's land for wages in cash or kind or share, is regarded as an agricultural labourer. Household industry is defined as an industry conducted by one or more members of the family within the household or village, and one that does not qualify for registration as a factory under the Factories Act. Other workers are persons engaged in some economic activity other than cultivators, agricultural labourers and household workers. It includes factory, mining, plantation, transport and office workers, those engaged in business and commerce, teachers, entertainment artistes and so on.

=== Infrastructure ===
There are 131 inhabited villages in the Jhalda I CD block, as per the District Census Handbook, Puruliya, 2011. 100% villages have power supply. 130 villages (99.24%) have drinking water supply. 20 villages (15.27%) have post offices. 99 villages (75.57%) have telephones (including landlines, public call offices and mobile phones). 25 villages (19.08%) have pucca (paved) approach roads and 40 villages (30.53%) have transport communication (includes bus service, rail facility and navigable waterways). 6 villages (4.58%) have agricultural credit societies and 7 villages (5.34%) have banks.

=== Agriculture ===
In 2013–14, persons engaged in agriculture in the Jhalda I CD block could be classified as follows: bargadars 0.78%, patta (document) holders 17.98%, small farmers (possessing land between 1 and 2 hectares) 8.82%, marginal farmers (possessing land up to 1 hectare) 29.94% and agricultural labourers 42.48%.

In 2013–14, the total area irrigated in the Jhalda I CD block was 11,232.60 hectares, out of which 2,585.00 hectares was by canal irrigation, 7,491.95 hectares by tank water, 59.55 hectares by river lift irrigation, 126.00 hectares by open dug wells and 970.00 hectares by other means.

In 2013–14, the Jhalda I CD block produced 42,521 tonnes of Aman paddy, the main winter crop, from 19,041 hectares and 5,555 tonnes of Boro paddy, the spring crop, from 256 hectares. It also produced khesari, gram and mustard.

=== Banking ===
In 2013–14, the Jhalda I CD block had offices of 7 commercial bank and 2 gramin banks.

=== Backward Regions Grant Fund ===
The Purulia district is listed as a backward region and receives financial support from the Backward Regions Grant Fund. The fund, created by the Government of India, is designed to redress regional imbalances in development. As of 2012, 272 districts across the country were listed under this scheme. The list includes 11 districts of West Bengal.

== Transport ==
In 2013–14, the Jhalda I CD block had 5 originating/ terminating bus routes.

Both State Highway 4 running from Jhalda (in the Purulia district) to Junput (in the Purba Medinipur district) and State Highway 4A running from Tulin to Chas Morh (both in the Purulia district) originate in this block.

The NSC Bose Gomoh-Hatia line of the South Eastern Railway passes through this CD block and there is a station at Tulin.

== Education ==
In 2013–14, the Jhalda I CD block had 144 primary schools with 10,514 students, 10 middle schools with 694 students and 13 higher secondary schools with 14,746 students. The Jhalda I CD block had 2 general colleges with 1,549 students, 1 professional/ technical institute with 48 students and 249 institutions with 8,841 students for special and non-formal education.

See also – Education in India

According to the 2011 census, in Jhalda I CD block, amongst the 131 inhabited villages, 8 villages did not have a school, 28 villages had two or more primary schools, 28 villages had at least 1 primary and 1 middle school and 17 villages had at least 1 middle and 1 secondary school.

Chitta Mahato Memorial College was established 2010 at Jargo.

== Healthcare ==
In 2014, the Jhalda I CD block had 1 block primary health centre and 2 primary health centres, with total 46 beds and 6 doctors. 8,572 patients were treated indoor and 198,949 patients were treated outdoor in the health centres and subcentres of the CD Block.

Jhalda Rural Hospital, with 30 beds at Jhalda, is the major government medical facility in the Jhalda I CD block. There are primary health centres at Ilu (with 10 beds) and Mahatomara (with 6 beds).
