= State Highway 5 (West Bengal) =

Road in West Bengal, India

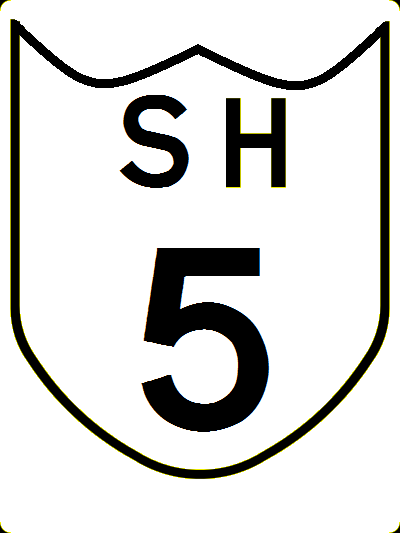
State Highway 5

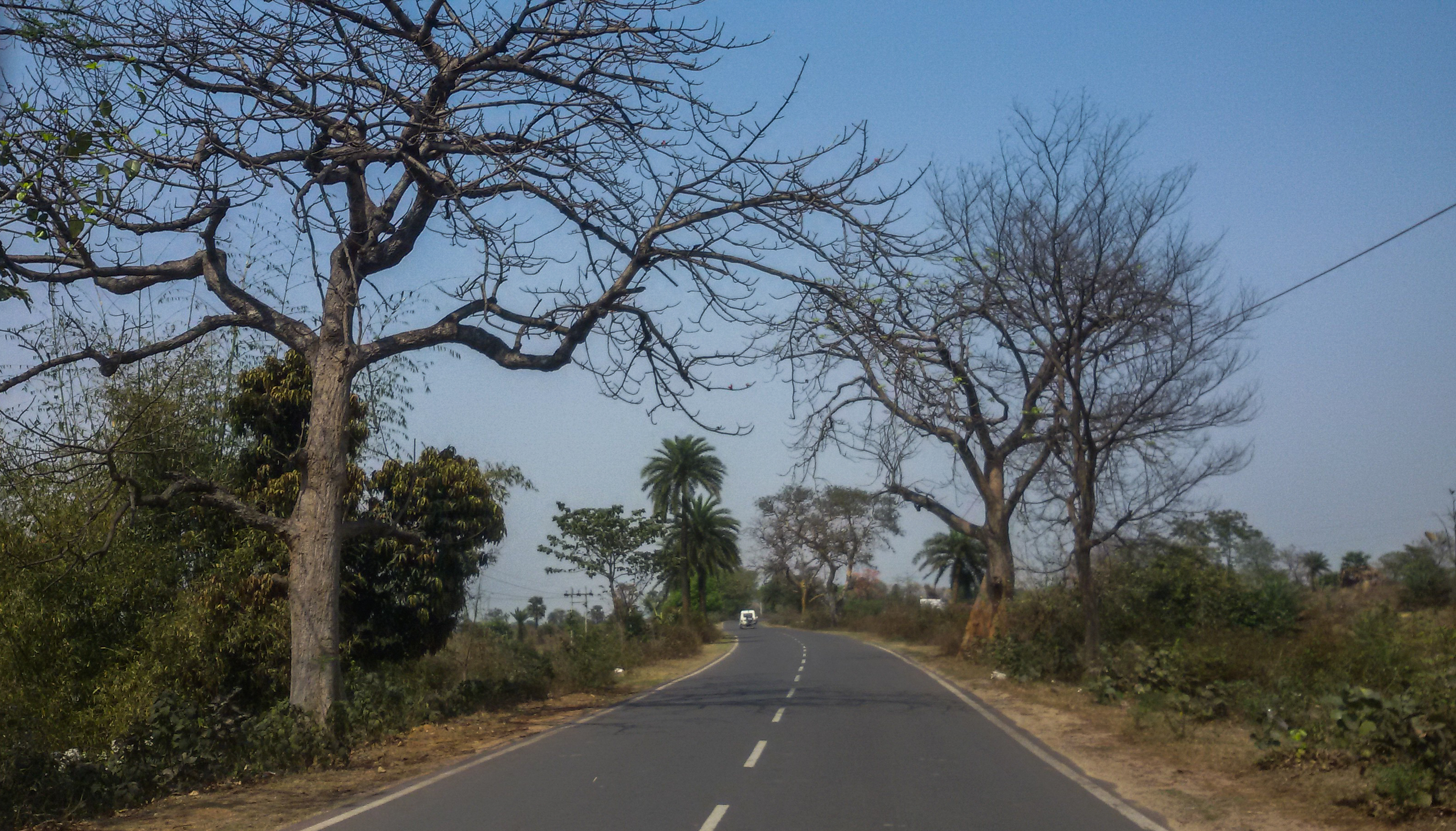

Route information
- Length: 376 km (234 mi)

Major junctions
- From: Rupnarayanpur
- NH 419 from terminus to Damda (in Purulia district); NH 19 just after Rupnarayanpur; Grand Trunk Road at Neamatpur; Dishergarh-Maithon Road at Dishergarh; SH 8 at Raghunathpur; NH 314 at Goshala Morh, Purulia; NH 18 (Will Cox Road) at Simulia-Dulmi; SH 4 at Manbazar; Bandwan-Mahulia Road at Bandwan; SH 9 at Silda; NH 49 from Lodhasuli to Kharagpur; NH 16 at Belda; SH 4 at Contai.
- To: Junput

Location
- Country: India
- State: West Bengal
- Districts: Paschim Bardhaman, Purulia, Bankura, Jhargram, Paschim Medinipur, Purba Medinipur

Highway system
- Roads in India; Expressways; National; State; Asian; State Highways in West Bengal

State Highway 5 (West Bengal) is a state highway in West Bengal, India.

== Route ==
SH 5 route in red colour

SH 5 originates from Rupnarayanpur and passes through Salanpur, Neamatpur, Dishergarh, Par Beliya, Raghunathpur, Bongabari, Purulia, Kenda, Manbazar, Bandwan, Jhilimili, Belpahari, Silda, Binpur, Dahijuri, Jhargram, Lodhasuli, Kharagpur, Salua, Keshiary, Belda, Dhaneswarpur, Egra, Contai and terminates at Junput.

National Highway Authority of India or NHAI has proposed a new highway that will connect Jhargram with Dankuni via Jhilimili, Mukutmanipur, Simlapal, Taldangra, Bishnupur, Jaypur, Kotulpur, Arambag, Champadanga & Chanditala. The new proposed National Highway will merge SH 2, SH 5 & SH 15 into a single route covering distance of 296 kilometres (184 mi).

The total length of SH 5 is 376 km.

Districts traversed by SH 5 are:
Paschim Bardhaman district (0 - 22 km)
Purulia district (22 – 183 km)
Bankura district (183 – 186 km)
Paschim Medinipur district (186 – 333 km)
Purba Medinipur district (333 – 376 km)

== Road sections ==
It is divided into different sections as follows:

Road Section	District	CD Block	Length (km)
Rupnayanpur-Neamatpur-Dishergarh	Paschim Bardhaman	Salanpur	22
Dishergarh-Purulia	Paschim Bardhaman, Purulia	Neturia, Raghunathpur I, Para, Purulia II, Purulia I	68
Purulia-Manbazar	Purulia	Manbazar I	48
Manbazar-Bandwan-Kuilapal-Jhilimili	Purulia, Bankura	Manbazar II, Bandwan	45
Jhilimili-Banspahari- Belpahari	Bankura, Jhargram	Ranibandh	28
Belpahari-Narayanpur-Silda	Jhargram	Binpur II	11
Silda-Binpur-Dahijuri	Jhargram	Binpur I	24
Dahijuri-Lodhashuli-Kharagpur	Jhargram, Paschim Medinipur	Jhargram, Kharagpur I	25
Kharagpur-Keshiary	Paschim Medinipur	Keshiari	27
Keshiary-Belda	Paschim Medinipur	Narayangarh	13
Belda-Contai-Junput	Purba Medinipur	Egra I, Egra II, Contai I, Contai II	65

== See also ==
- List of state highways in West Bengal
