= Bandwan Assembly constituency =

West Bengal Legislative Assembly constituency

Bandwan
- Constituency No. 238 for the West Bengal Legislative Assembly
- Interactive Map Outlining Bandwan Assembly Constituency

Constituency details
- Country: India
- Region: East India
- State: West Bengal
- District: Purulia
- Lok Sabha constituency: Jhargram
- Established: 1962
- Total electors: 223,641
- Reservation: ST

Member of Legislative Assembly
- 18th West Bengal Legislative Assembly
- Incumbent Labsen Baskey
- Party: BJP
- Alliance: NDA
- Elected year: 2026

Bandwan is an assembly constituency in Purulia district in the Indian state of West Bengal. It is reserved for scheduled tribes.

== Overview ==
As per orders of the Delimitation Commission, No. 238 Bandwan Assembly constituency (ST) is composed of the following: Bandwan, Barabazar and Manbazar II community development blocks.

Bandwan Assembly constituency (ST) is part of No. 33 Jhargram (Lok Sabha constituency) (ST).

== Members of the Legislative Assembly ==
Year	Name	Party
1962	Kandru Majhi	Lok Sewak Sangh
1967	Kandru Majhi	Lok Sewak Sangh
1969	Budheswar Majhi	Indian National Congress
1971	Sital Chandra Hembram	Indian National Congress
1972	Sital Chandra Hembram	Indian National Congress
1977	Sudhangsu Sekhar Majhi	Communist Party of India
1982	Sudhangsu Sekhar Majhi	Communist Party of India
1987	Lakshi Ram Kisku	Communist Party of India
1991	Lakshi Ram Kisku	Communist Party of India
1996	Lakshi Ram Kisku	Communist Party of India
2001	Upendra Nath Hansda	Communist Party of India
2006	Upendra Nath Hansda	Communist Party of India
2011	Susanta Besra	Communist Party of India
2016	Rajib Lochan Saren	All India Trinamool Congress
2021	Rajib Lochan Saren	All India Trinamool Congress
2026	Labsen Baskey	Bharatiya Janata Party

== Election results ==
=== 2026 ===
2026 West Bengal Legislative Assembly election: Bandwan
Party	Candidate	Votes	%	±%
BJP	Labsen Baskey	134,080	50.37	+11.16
AITC	Rajib Lochan Saren	104,503	39.26	−7.76
CPI(M)	Rathu Singh	15,474	5.81	−3.4
INC	Siten Mandi	2,833	1.06	
NOTA	None of the above	2,780	1.04	−0.19
Majority		29,577	11.11	+3.3
Turnout		266,178	93.01	+8.38
BJP gain from AITC		Swing		

=== 2021 ===
Rajib Lochan Saren of AITC won the election in 2021 defeating the runner up candidate Parcy Murmu of BJP.

West Bengal assembly elections, 2021: Bandwan (ST) constituency
Party	Candidate	Votes	%	±%
AITC	Rajib Lochan Saren	113,337	47.02	
BJP	Parcy Murmu	94,506	39.21	
CPI(M)	Susanta Kumar Besra	22,204	9.21	
Independent	Sib Sankar Singh	5,067	2.1	
BSP	Tikaram Hembram	2,987	1.24	
NOTA	None of the above	2,954	1.23	
Majority		18,831	7.81	
Turnout		241,055	84.63	
AITC hold		Swing		

=== 2016 ===
Rajib Lochan Saren (AITC) won the election in 2016 defeating the runner up candidate Susanta Besra(CPM ).

West Bengal assembly elections, 2016: Bandwan (ST) constituency
Party	Candidate	Votes	%	±%
AITC	Rajib Lochan Saren	104,323	47.85	
CPI(M)	Susanta Kumar Besra	84,016	38.53	−9.75
BJP	Labsen Baskey	14,371	6.59	+2.75
JMM	Kamalakanta Baskey	5,201	2.39	−3.59
NOTA	None of the above	3,906	1.79	
Independent	Bharat Singh	1,749	0.80	
AMB	Manohar Tudu	1,092	0.50	
AJSU	Jalim Chandra Saren	970	0.44	
Independent	Prakash Mandi	854	0.39	
SUCI(C)	Sukumar Tudu	785	0.36	
AKBJHP	Sadhuram Saren	769	0.35	
Turnout		218,036	85.17	+4.60
AITC gain from CPI(M)		Swing		

=== 2011 ===
In the 2011 elections, Susanta Besra of CPI(M) defeated his nearest rival Sital Chandra Hembram of Congress.

West Bengal assembly elections, 2011: Bandwan
Party	Candidate	Votes	%	±%
CPI(M)	Susanta Kumar Besra	87,183	48.38	−6.72
INC	Sital Chandra Hembram	65,163	36.16	
JMM	Chunaram Hembram	10,769	5.98	
BJP	Manika Murmu	6,912	3.84	
Independent	Jagran Murmu	4,217		
JDP	Biswanath Baskey	2,338		
AJSU	Fatik Kumar Hembram	2,051		
JVM(P)	Jalim Chandra Soren	1,559		
Turnout		180,192	80.57	
CPI(M) hold		Swing	#	

.# Congress did not contest this seat in 2006.

=== 2006 ===
In the 2006 and 2001 state assembly elections, Upendra Nath Hansda of CPI(M) won the Bandwan (ST) assembly seat, defeating his nearest rivals Kamala Kanta Mandi of BJP and Birsing Murmu of JMM respectively. Contests in most years were multi cornered but only winners and runners are being mentioned. Lakhiram Kisku of CPI(M) defeated Sital Chandra Hembram of Congress in 1996, Birsing Murmu of JMM in 1991 and Ramprasad Hansda of Congress in 1987. Sudhansu Sekhar Majhi of CPI(M) defeated Panchanan Soren, Independent, in 1982, and Budheswar Majhi of Congress in 1977.

=== 1972 ===
Sital Chandra Hembram of Congress won in 1972 and 1971. Budheswar Majhi of Congress won in 1969. Kandru Majhi, Independent/ Lok Sewak Sangh, won in 1967 and 1962. Prior to that the Bandwan seat was not there.
