= Mukutmanipur Dam =

- Location within West Bengal
- Location: Bankura District, West Bengal, India
- Coordinates: 22.963949°N 86.788800°E

Dam and spillways
- Impounds: Kangsabati River
- Length: 11,270 metres (36,980 ft)
- Width (base): 38 metres (125 ft)
- Website mukutmanipur.in

The Mukutmanipur Dam is a dam in Khatra subdivision of Bankura district in the state of West Bengal, India.

The Kangsabati River, also known as the Kasai and Kumari, originates from the Chota Nagpur Plateau in West Bengal. It flows through the districts of Purulia, Bankura, and Paschim Medinipur before draining into the Bay of Bengal. The Mukutmanipur Dam, built along this river, is the second longest earthen dam in India, measuring 11.27 km, surpassed only by the Sri Ram Sagar Project (SRSP) in Telangana. The dam has a gross storage capacity of 1.04 cubic kilometers (36.73 tmcft) and is the only dam in West Bengal designated as 'Dam of National Importance' by the Central Water Commission of the Government of India. The dam is essential for irrigation, supporting a total cultivable area of 340,752 hectares during the Kharif season and 60,704 hectares during the Rabi season. Mukutmanipur serves as a significant tourism hub in West Bengal, attracting visitors with its scenic landscapes, recreational activities on the reservoir, and natural beauty.

The road over the dam is 11 kilometres (6.8 mi) long. At the midpoint is a small hill, Pareshnath Hill, where several Jain and Hindu deity statues are displayed in the open air. These artifacts were uncovered during the excavation for the dam. Another Jain statue lies at the base of Pareshnath Hill.

== Ecology ==
Mukutmanipur is a recognized birding hotspot, particularly known for its diverse populations of waterbirds and grassland birds, with over 160 species reported in the region. The area includes a fenced conservation reserve, designated by the government, where over 100 chital deer are housed.

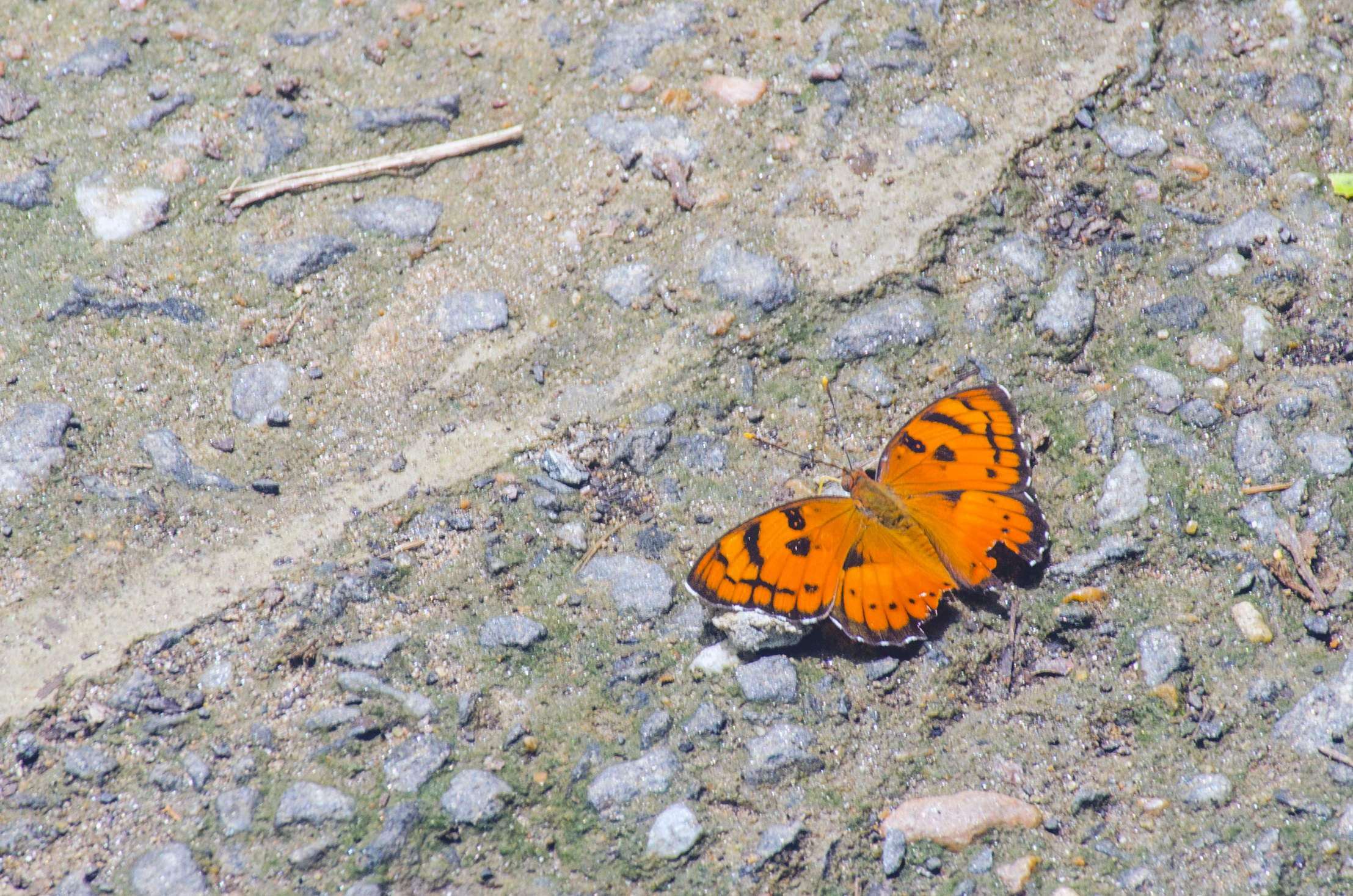
Baronet (butterfly) at Mukutmanipur

Each winter, more than 5,000 migratory birds, including species such as the Lesser Whistling Teal, Red-crested Pochard, Gadwall, Common Coot, and various terns, swallows, and wagtails, arrive in late November and typically remain until late February. Other notable birds observed in the area include Indian Gray Hornbill, Darter, Spot-billed Duck, Grebes, and the Rufous-tailed Lark, with recent sightings of various bunting species.

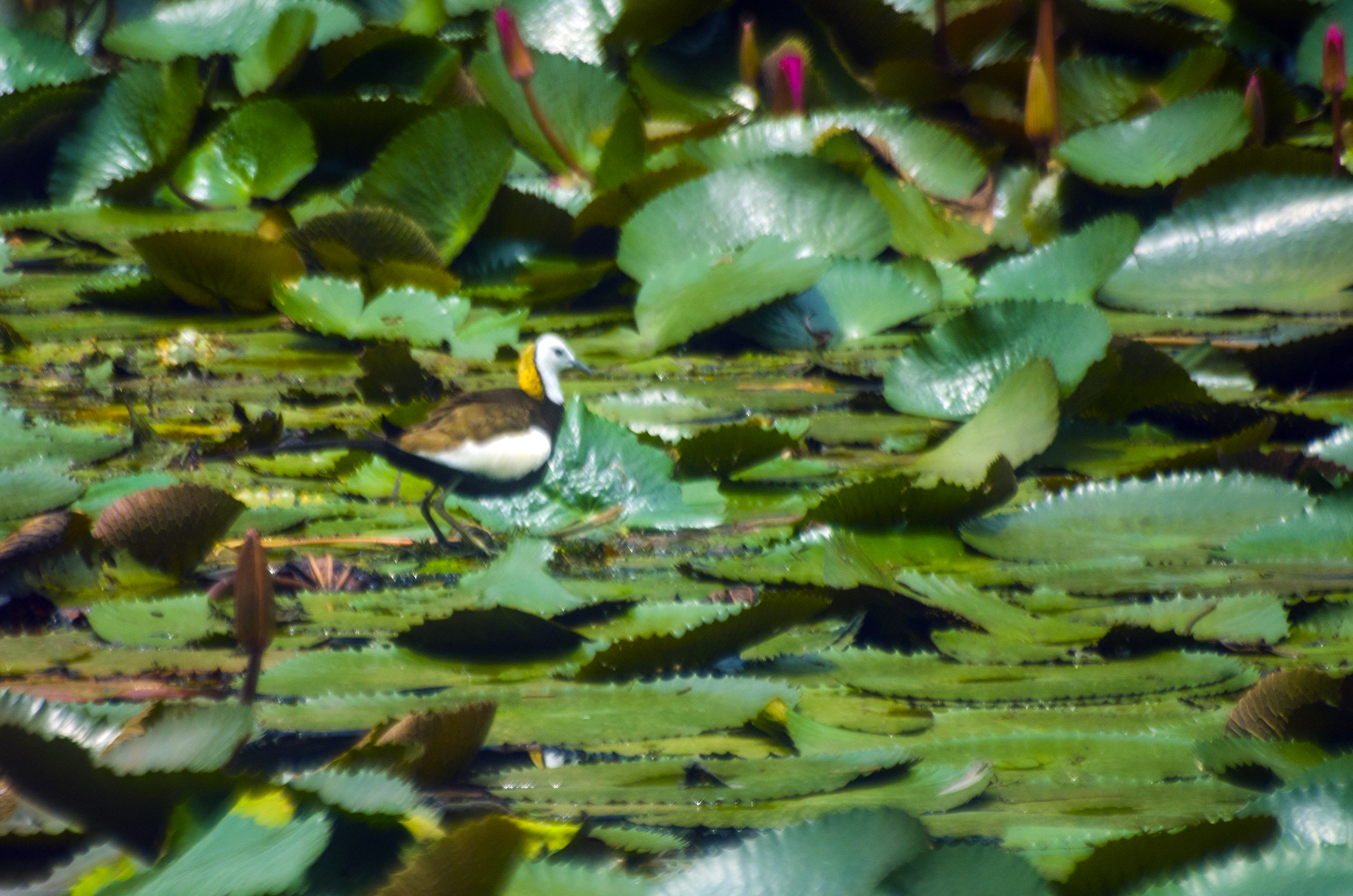
Pheasant-tailed Jacana at Mukutmanipur

== Accessibility ==
Several trains operate between Howrah railway station and Bankura Railway Station, which is about 233 kilometers distant. From there, a 72-kilometer bus ride completes the journey.

== Gallery ==
Gallery of Mukutmanipur Dam

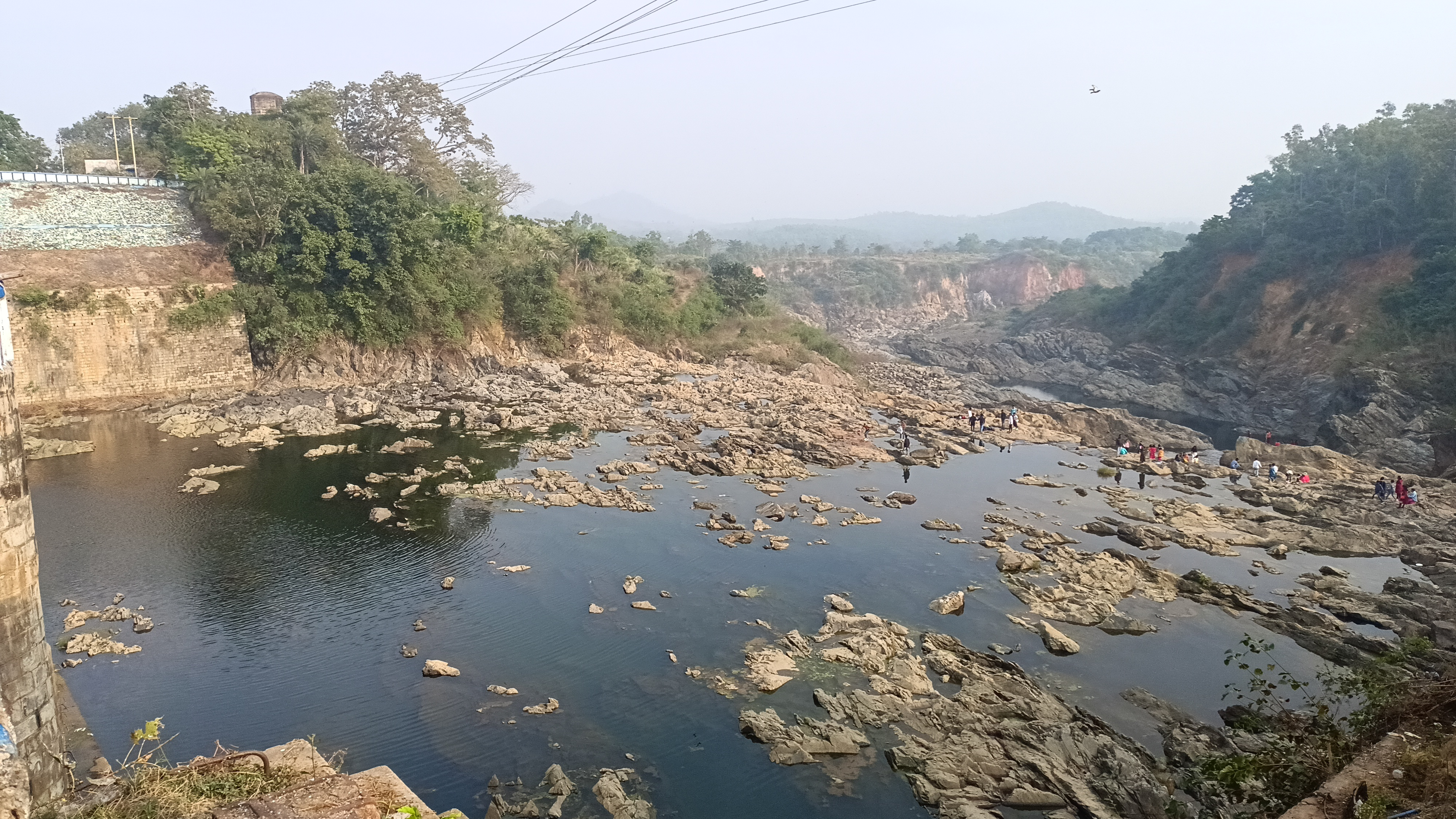
Waterflow at Mukutmanipur Dam

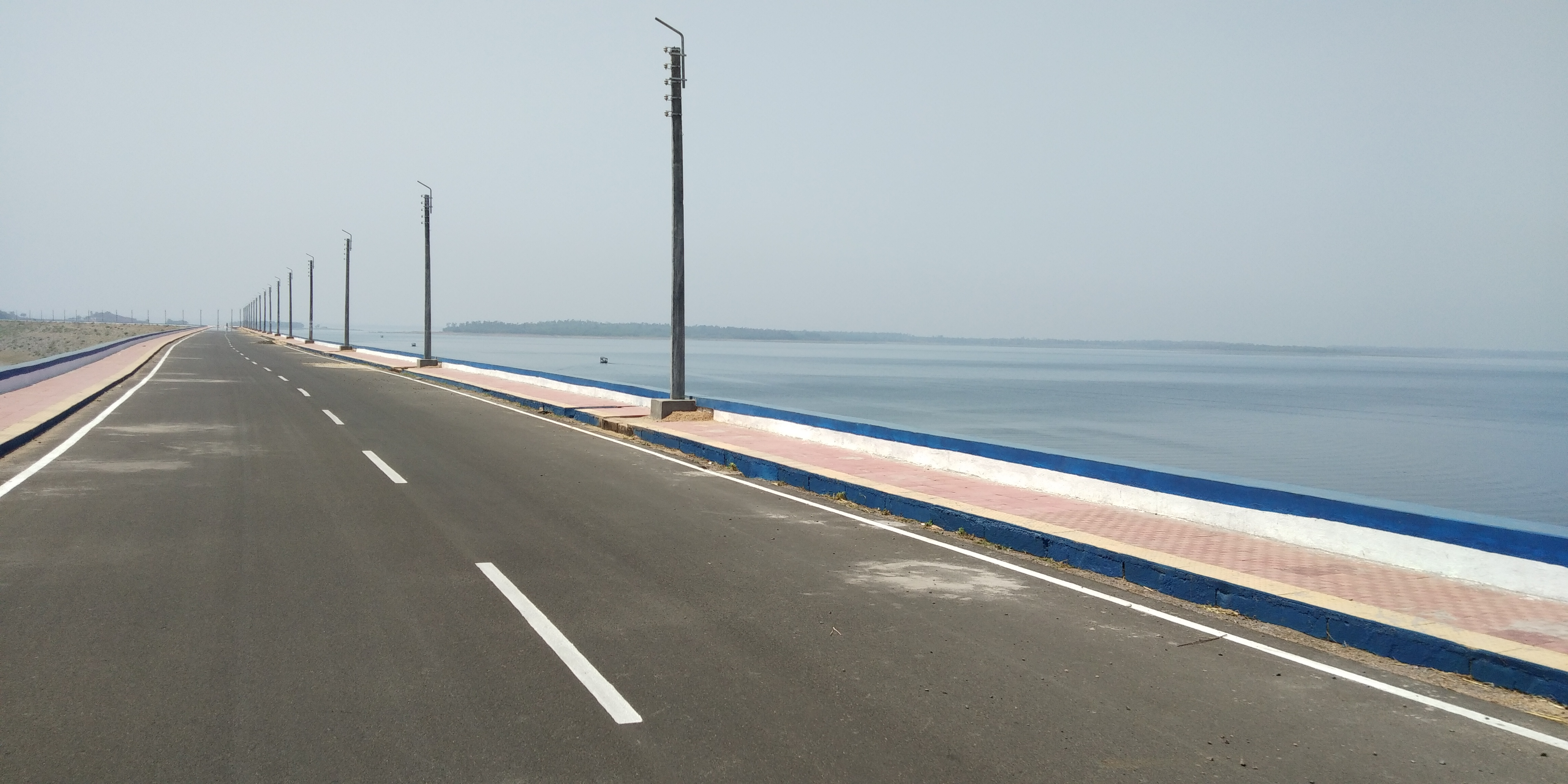
Road View of Mukutmanipur Dam.

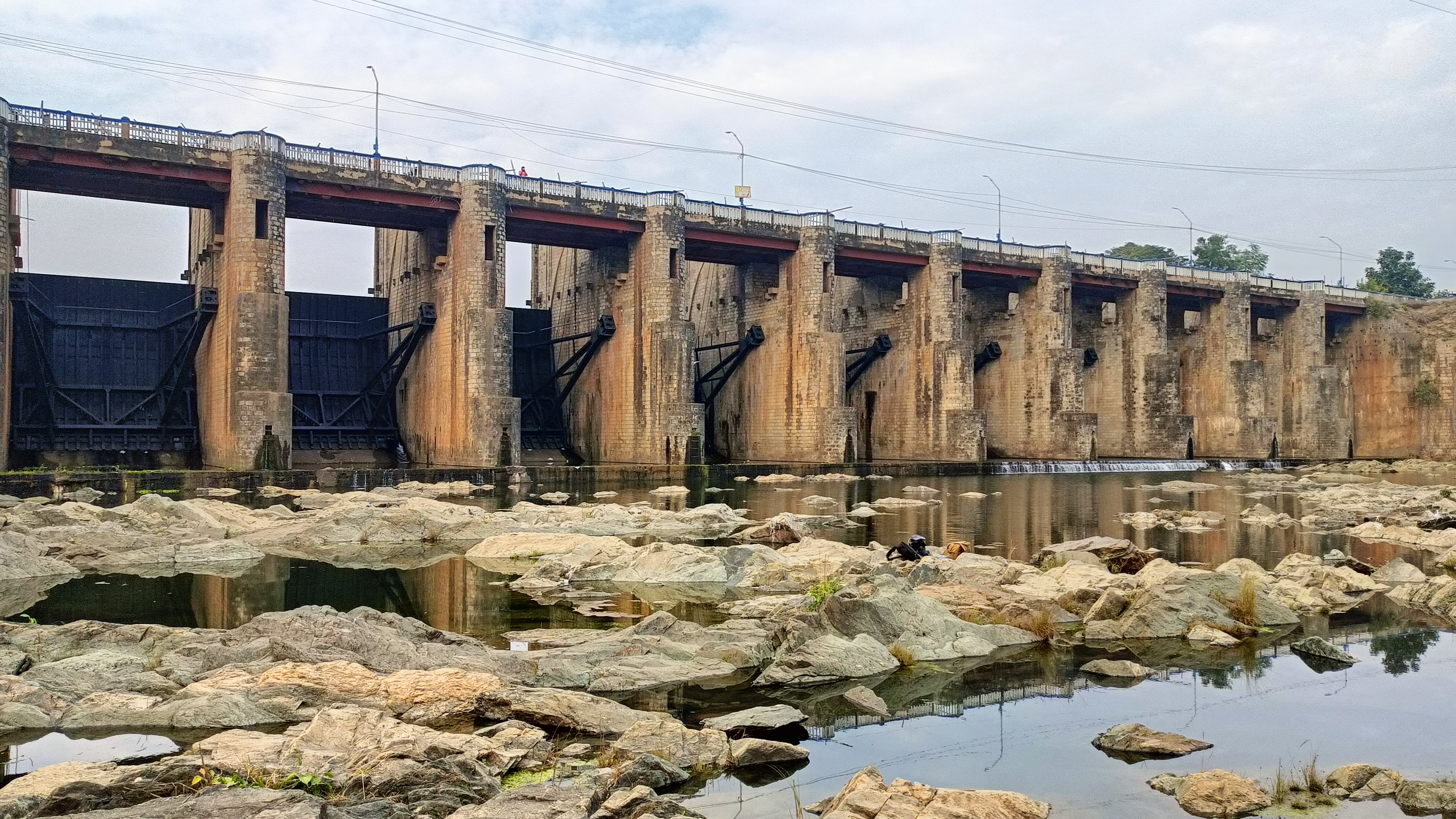
Lock Gates of Mukutmanipur Dam

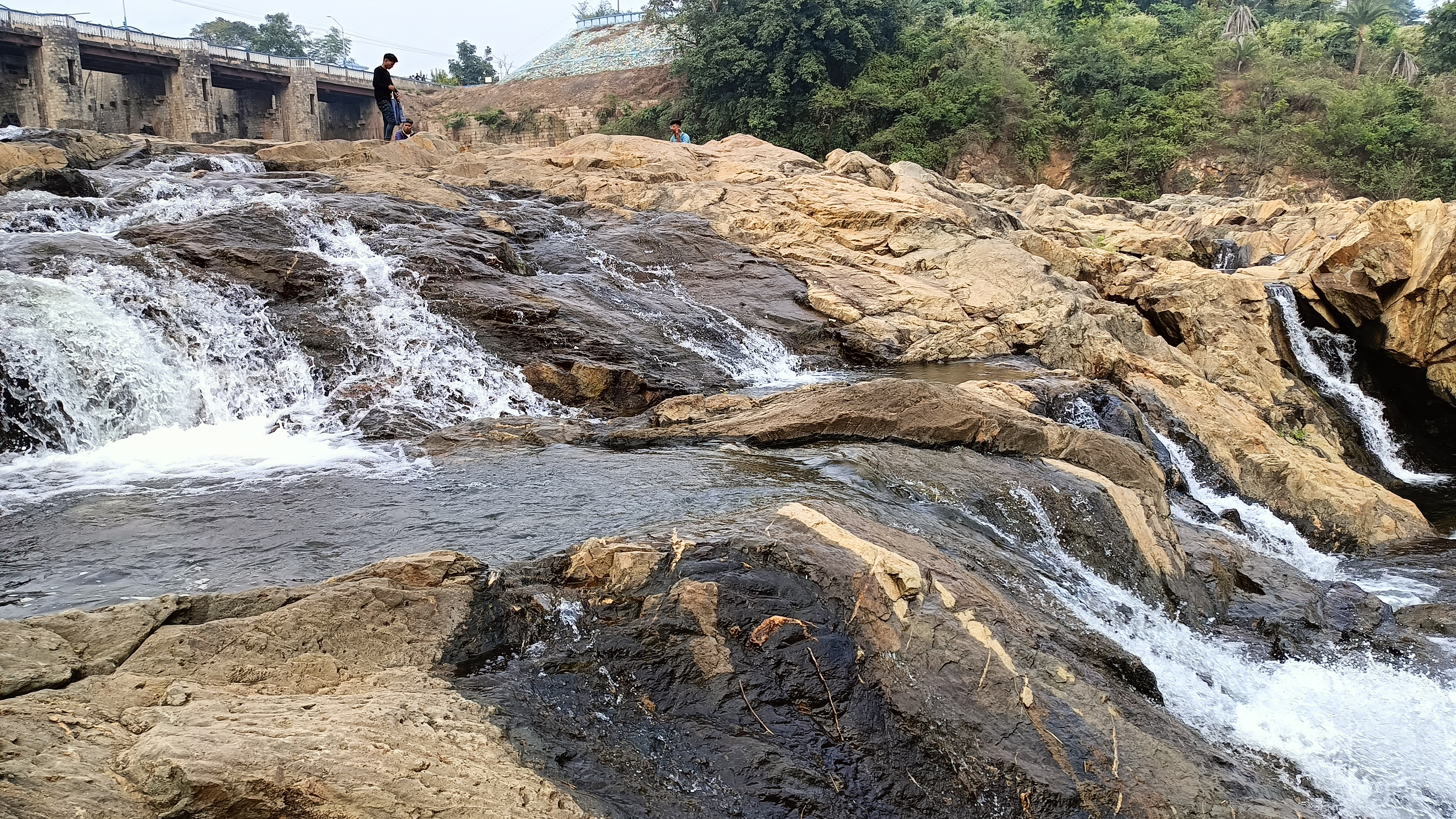
