= Purulia Sadar West subdivision =

- Subdivision
- Location in West Bengal, India Purulia Sadar West subdivision (India)
- Coordinates: 23.37°N 85.97°E
- Country: India
- State: West Bengal
- District: Purulia
- Headquarters: Jhalda

Area
  - Total: 2,327.98 km^{2} (898.84 sq mi)

Population
  - Total: 1,037,021
  - Density: 445.460/km^{2} (1,153.74/sq mi)

Languages
  - Official: Bengali, English
- Time zone: UTC+5:30 (IST)
- ISO 3166 code: IN-WB
- Vehicle registration: WB

Purulia Sadar West subdivision was a subdivision of the Purulia district in the state of West Bengal, India, till reorganisation of the subdivisions in Purlia district in 2017.

== Subdivisions ==
Purulia district was divided into the following administrative subdivisions till reorganisation:

Subdivision	Headquarter	Area km^{2}	Population (2011)	Rural Population % (2001)	Urban Population % (2001)
Purulia Sadar West subdivision	Jhalda	2,327.98	1,037,021	94.60	5.40
Purulia Sadar East subdivision	Purulia	2,336.20	1,055,337	87.55	12.45
Raghunathpur subdivision	Raghunathpur	1,559.68	83,7757	87.37	12.63
Purulia district	Purulia	6,259.00	2,930,115	89.93	10.07

Purulia Sadar West subdivision has a density of population of 445 per km^{2}. 35.39% of the population of the district resides in this subdivision.

== Administrative units ==
Purulia Sadar West subdivision has 7 police stations, 7 community development blocks, 7 panchayat samitis, 59 gram panchayats, 882 inhabited villages, 1 municipality, 5 census towns. The single municipality is at Jhalda. The census towns are: Chekya, Begun Kodar, Jaypur, Balarampur, Barabazar. Jhalda, a municipal town, has been included as a census town in the census figures. It is not included as a census town here. The subdivision has its headquarters at Jhalda.

== Police stations ==
Police stations in Purulia Sadar West subdivision have the following features and jurisdiction:

Police Station	Area covered km^{2}	Inter-state border km	Municipal Town	CD Block
Arsha	187.5	-	-	Arsha
Baghmundi	275	41.91	-	Banghmundi
Balarampur	299.5	12.39	-	Balarampur
Barabazar	414	44.39	-	Barabazar
Jaypur	230.50	52	-	Joypur
Jhalda	290	48.7	Jhalda	Jhalda I, Jhalda II (part)
Kotshila	284	25.48	-	Jhalda II (part)

== Blocks ==
Community development blocks in Purulia Sadar West subdivision are:

CD Block	Headquarters	Area km^{2}	Population (2011)	SC %	ST %	Literacy rate %	Census Towns
Jhalda I	Masina	315.09	137,143	12.39	11.38	66.18	
Jhalda II	Kotshila	256.61	148,156	10.57	10.74	54.76	2
Joypur	Jaypur	230.47	133,349	14.37	9.80	57.94	1
Arsha	Sirkabad	375.04	154,736	11.82	21.69	54.78	
Baghmundi	Patardi	427.95	135,579	10.36	25.11	57.17	
Balarampur	Baghadih	300.88	137.950	11.91	31.71	60.40	1
Barabazar	Barabazar	418.06	170,569	7.39	19.40	63.27	1

== Gram panchayats ==
The subdivision contains 59 gram panchayats under 7 community development blocs:

- Jhalda–I block: Ichag, Jhalda–Darda, Mathari–Khamar, Tulin, Ilu–Jargo, Kalma, Noyadih, Hensahatu, Marum Osina and Pusti.
- Jhalda–II block: Bamniya–Belyadih, Chitmu, Nowahatu, Begunkodar, Hirapur Adardih, Rigid, Chekya, Majhidih and Tatuara.
- Joypur block: Baragram, Joypur, Ropo, Upankahan, Ghagra, Mukundapur and Sidhi–Jamra.
- Arsha: Arsha, Chatuhansa, Hensla, Puara, Beldih, Hetgugui, Mankiary and Sirkabad.
- Bagmundi block: Ajodhya, Beergram, Matha, Sindri, Baghmundi, Burda–Kalimati, Serengdih and Tunturi–Suisa.
- Balarampur block: Balarampur, Bela, Genrua, Tentlow, Baraurma, Darda and Ghatbera–Kerowa.
- Barabazar block: Banjora, Berada, Latpada, Tumrasole, Bansbera, Bhagabandh, Sindri, Barabazar and Dhelatbamu Sukurhutu.

== Electoral constituencies ==
Lok Sabha (parliamentary) and Vidhan Sabha (state assembly) constituencies in Purulia district were as follows:

Lok Sabha constituency	Vidhan Sabha constituency	Reservation	CD Block and/or Gram panchayat
Purulia	Balarampur	None	Balarampur CD Block; Chakaltore, Dimdiha, Durku, Garafusra, Lagda and Sonaijuri gram panchayats of Purulia I CD Block; and Chatu Hansa, Hensla and Puara gram panchayats of Arsha CD Block.
	Baghmundi	None	Jhalda municipality; Jhalda I and Baghmundi CD Blocks; Hetgugui and Sirkabad gram panchayats of Arsha CD Block.
	Joypur	None	Joypur and Jhalda II CD Blocks; Arsha, Beldih and Manikary gram panchayats of Arsha CD Block.
	Purulia	None	Purulia municipality; Purulia II CD Block; Bhandar Purachipida and Manara gram panchayats of Purulia I CD Block.
	Manbazar	ST	Manbazar I and Puncha CD Blocks; Chatumadar, Daldali and Manguria Lalpur gram panchayats of Hura CD Block.
	Kashipur	None	Kashipur CD Block; Hura, Jabarrah, Kalabani, Keshargarh, Ladhurka, Lakhanpur and Rakhera Bishpuri gram panchayats of Hura CD Block.
	Para	SC	Para and Raghunathpur II CD Blocks.
Bankura	Raghunathpur	SC	Raghunathpur municipality; Raghunathpur I, Neturia and Santuri CD Blocks.
	Other assembly segments in Bankura district		
Jhargram (ST)	Bandwan	ST	Bandwan, Barabazar and Manbazar II CD Blocks.
	Other assembly segments in Paschim Medinipur district		
