= Chhau (disambiguation) =

The chhau is a popular dance in India.

Chhau may also refer to:

- Chhau Mask of Purulia district
- Chhau, Jhunjhunu, an Indian village
- Chháu, a Minnan-dialect romanization of the Chinese surname Cao
