= Agharpur =

- Village
- Location in West Bengal, India Agharpur (India)
- Coordinates: 23.4213°N 86.2078°E
- Country: India
- State: West Bengal
- District: Purulia

Population (2011)
  - Total: 1,287

Languages
  - Official: Bengali, English
- Time zone: UTC+5:30 (IST)
- PIN: 723103
- Telephone/STD code: 03254
- Lok Sabha constituency: Purulia
- Vidhan Sabha constituency: Joypur
- Website: purulia.gov.in
- Places in Jhalda subdivision in Purulia district. Key: M: municipality, C: census town, R: rural/ urban centre, H: historical/ religious centre, X: craft centre, T: tourist centre, △: hills Owing to space constraints in the small map, the locations in the larger map on click through may vary slightly.

Agharpur is a village in the Joypur CD block in the Jhalda subdivision of the Purulia district in the state of West Bengal, India.

== Geography ==
=== Location ===
Agharpur is located at 23.4213°N 86.2078°E.

=== Area overview ===
Purulia district forms the lowest step of the Chota Nagpur Plateau. The general scenario is undulating land with scattered hills. Jhalda subdivision, shown in the map alongside, is located in the western part of the district, bordering Jharkhand. The Subarnarekha flows along a short stretch of its western border. It is an overwhelmingly rural subdivision with 91.02% of the population living in the rural areas and 8.98% living in the urban areas. There are 3 census towns in the subdivision. The map alongside shows some of the tourist attractions in the Ajodhya Hills. The area is home to Purulia Chhau dance with spectacular masks made at Charida. The remnants of old temples and deities are found in the subdivision also, as in other parts of the district.

== Demographics ==
According to the 2011 Census of India, Agharpur had a total population of 1,287, of which 674 (52%) were males and 613 (48%) were females. There were 175 persons in the age range of 0–6 years. The total number of literate persons in Agharpur was 845 (75.99% of the population over 6 years).

== Education ==
Ramkrishna Mahato Government Engineering College (earlier known as Purulia Government Engineering College) was established at Agharpur in 2016. It offers degree courses in various engineering disciplines.

== Transport ==
There is a station at Chas Road on the Purulia-Kotshila branch line of the South Eastern Railway. It is 20 km (12 mi) from Purulia.
