= Chhau mask =

Mask used for Chhau dancing

Purulia Chhau mask
- Geographical indication
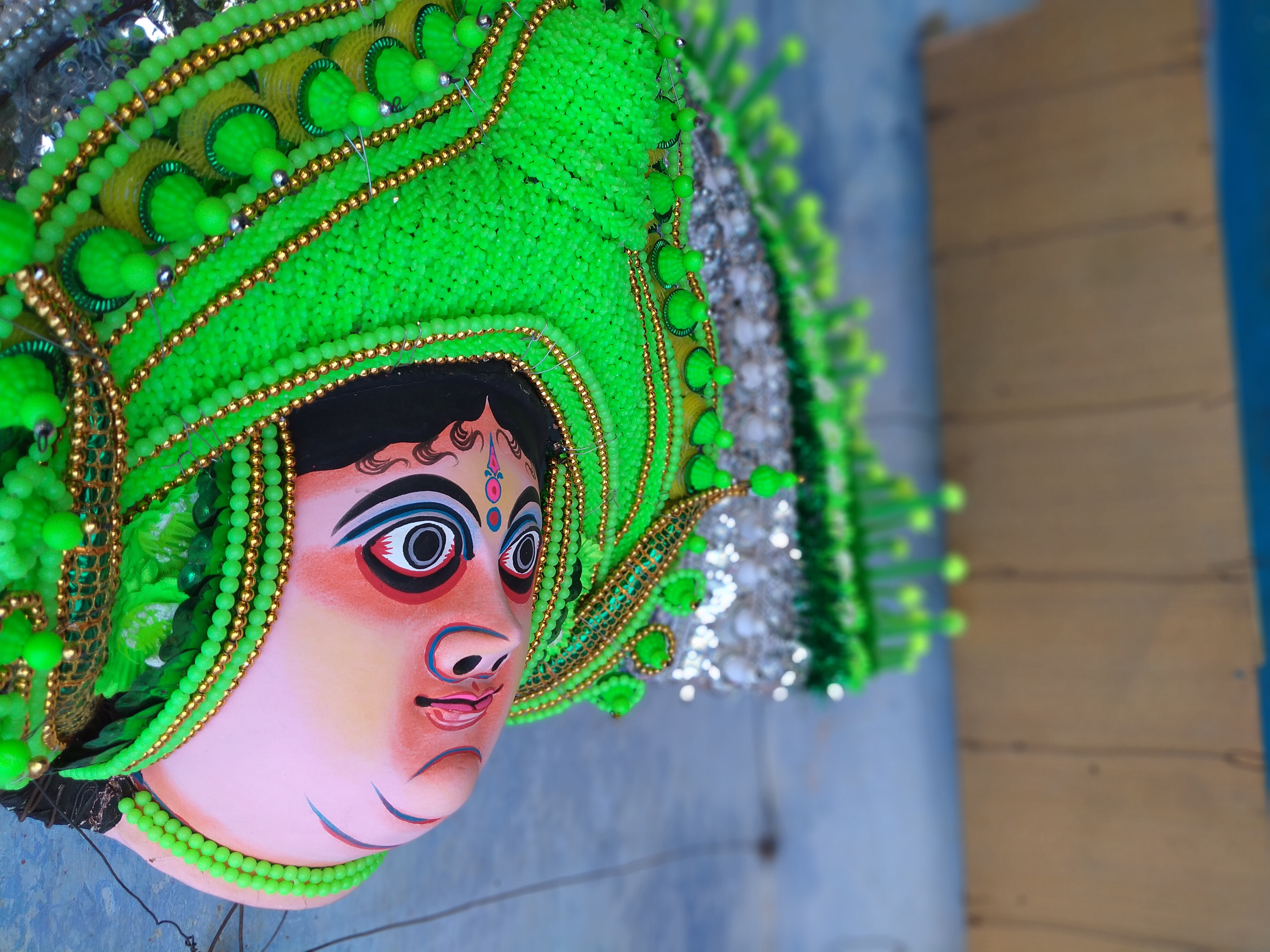
- Chhau mask of Charida, Purulia
- Alternative names: Chhau dance mask
- Description: Chhau mask is used for Chhau dance in Purulia
- Type: West Bengal folk cultural art
- Area: Purulia and nearby villages
- Country: India
- Registered: 28 March 2018
- Material: Clay, soft paper, diluted glue, cloth, mud, fine ash powder etc.

The Chhau mask is a traditional cultural heritage of Purulia in the Indian state of West Bengal. The Chhau mask of Purulia is registered on the List of Geographical Indications. As the basic difference of Purulia Chhau the mask is unique and traditional.

It is the mask which differentiates the Purulia Chhau from its other two significant branches: the Seraikella Chhau of Jharkhand and the Mayurbhanj Chhau of Odisha. The Jharkhand counterpart does involve masks but they are rather simpler, small and evocative, without any of the pompous vibrancy of the Purulia variants. While the Mayurbhanj type is an unmasked form. It is the Purulia form only that uses large evocative masks along with elaborate costumes that intensify the energetic performance, despite the challenges to physicalization.

The mask allows the artists to morph into the character — therefore Anusua Mukherjee notes that when an artists wears a particular mask, he or she “gets into character immediately, transforming into mellow Kartik, fierce Ravana, or Durga’s ferocious lion”. Chhau artist Anil Mahato says, “Shiva danced the tandava : wearing his mask brings in that frisson for me.” One could perhaps imagine the centrality of the mask to Chhau dance with the Thalia or the Melpomene masks used in Greek Comedy and Tragedy theatres respectively, or perhaps the masks used in mystery plays during the middle ages

== History ==
The tradition of making Chhau masks started during the rule of king Madan Mohan Singh Deo of Baghmundi. The Chhau mask is traditionally associated with the age-old dance forms in Purulia district.

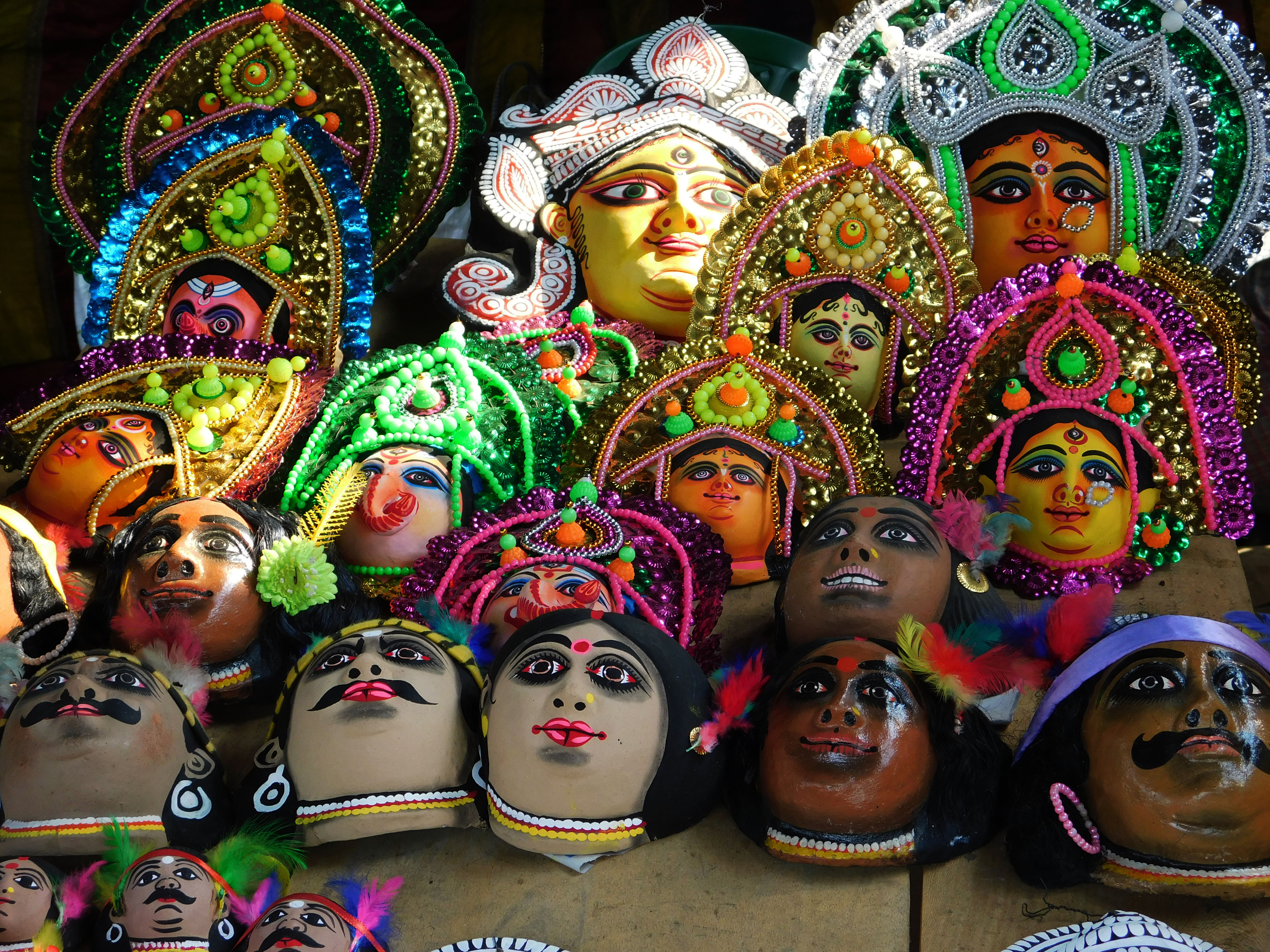
Variety of Masks. The Kirat-Kiratini masks can be seen in the front rows.

The tradition of mask-making was popularised by Buddeshwar, who is venerated as the first mask maker of Charida. In Charida, there is also a statue of Buddeshwar. He is said to have created the first male and female masks, known as Kirat and Kiratni, representing forms of Shiva and Parvati. This was a turning point in the history of mask-making.

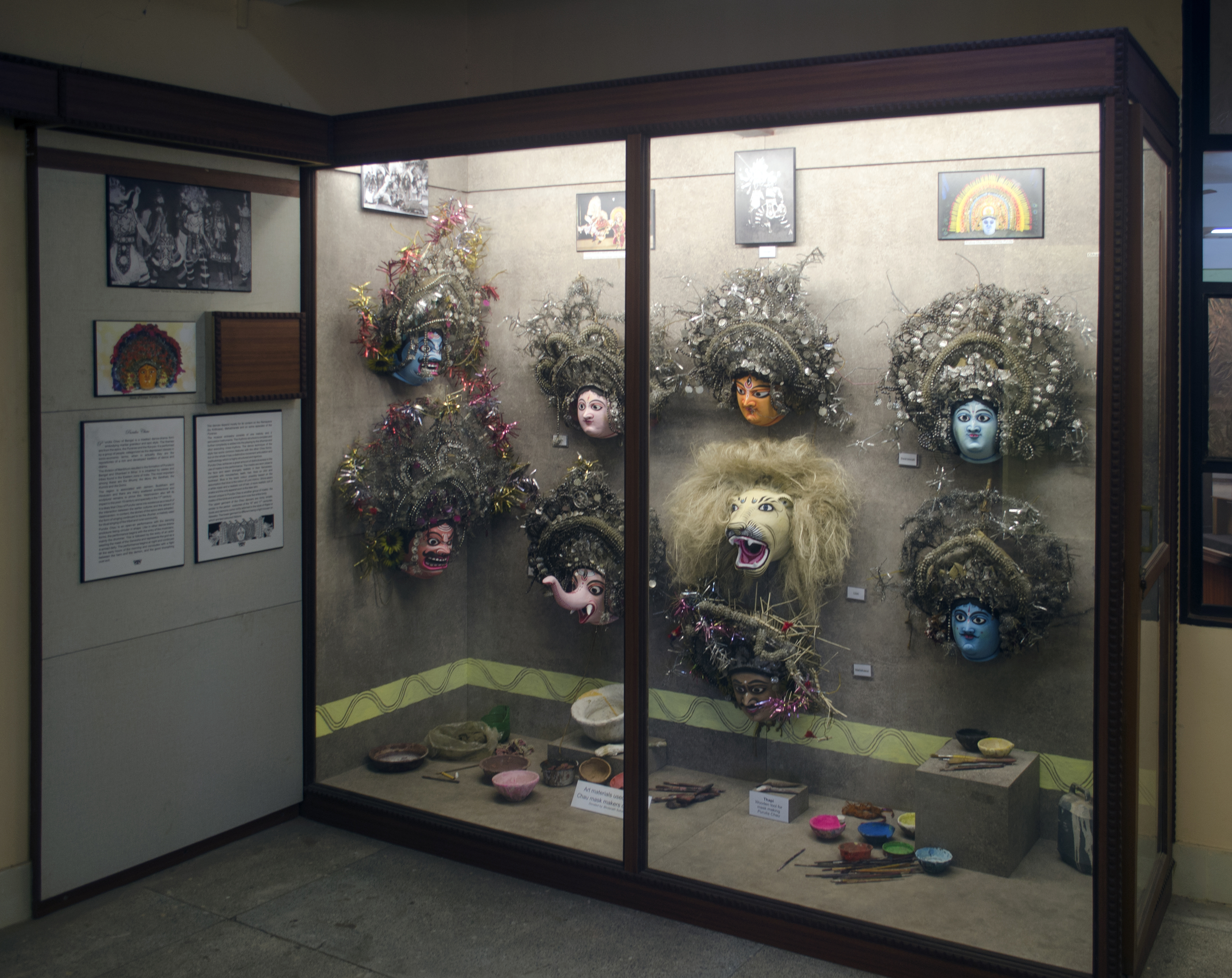
Chhau Masks on display at the Theatre Museum in Kolkata.

== Themes ==
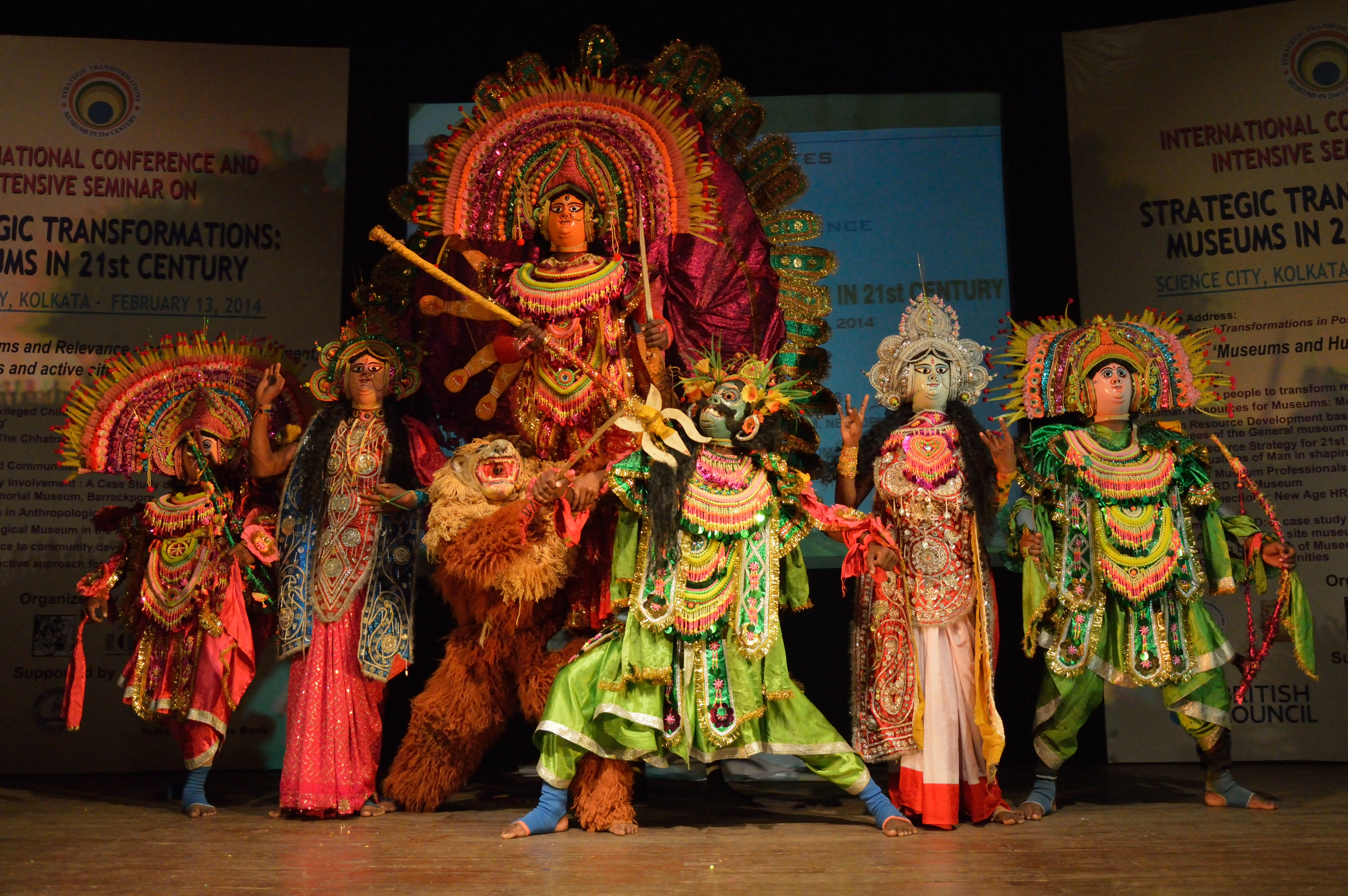
Mahisasuramardini in Purulia Chhau

The Purulia Chhau mask received the GI tag in 2018. This has been a welcome step: the artists have become more aware of their intellectual property rights. Besides being used for performances, some of the masks are sold as keepsakes and souvenirs particularly to the tourists.

The masks are of various types used for particular dance renditions. They are classified into the babu, bir, bhoot, animal, birds, and nari masks.

The babu category includes masks for chiefly male gods like Narayana, Ganesha, Kartik, Krishna, Shiva, etc. The bir or the hero masks would include those worn by artists who play the demons like Ravana and Mahishasura. Tiger, buffalo, monkey heroes like Bali and Sugriva from the epic Ramayana fall under the category of animal masks. Durga, Parvati, Saraswati and incarnations of the Goddess are categorised under the nari or women masks, while bird masks are for Jatayu, peacock, swan, etc.

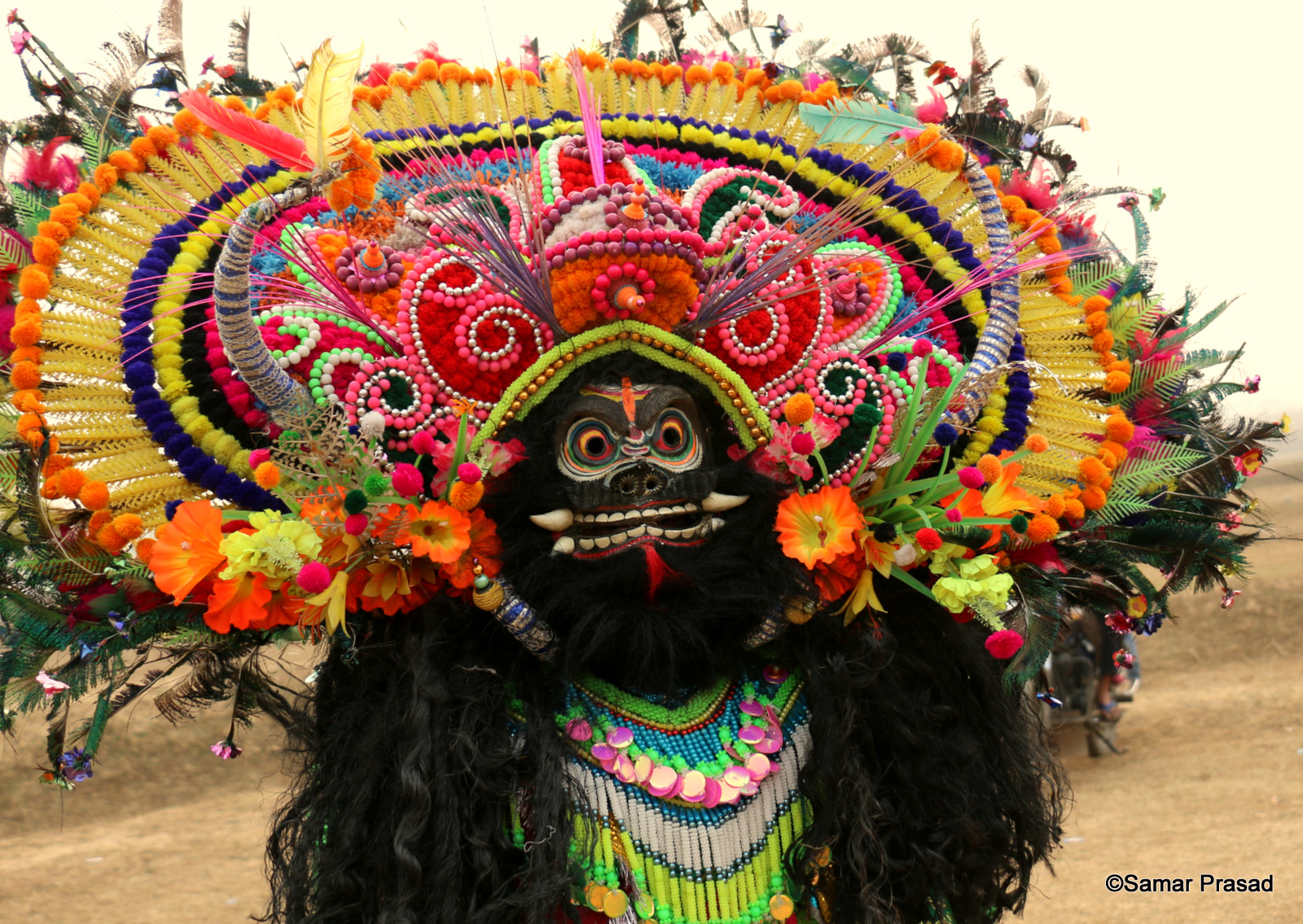
A typical bir mask showing the face of a demon.

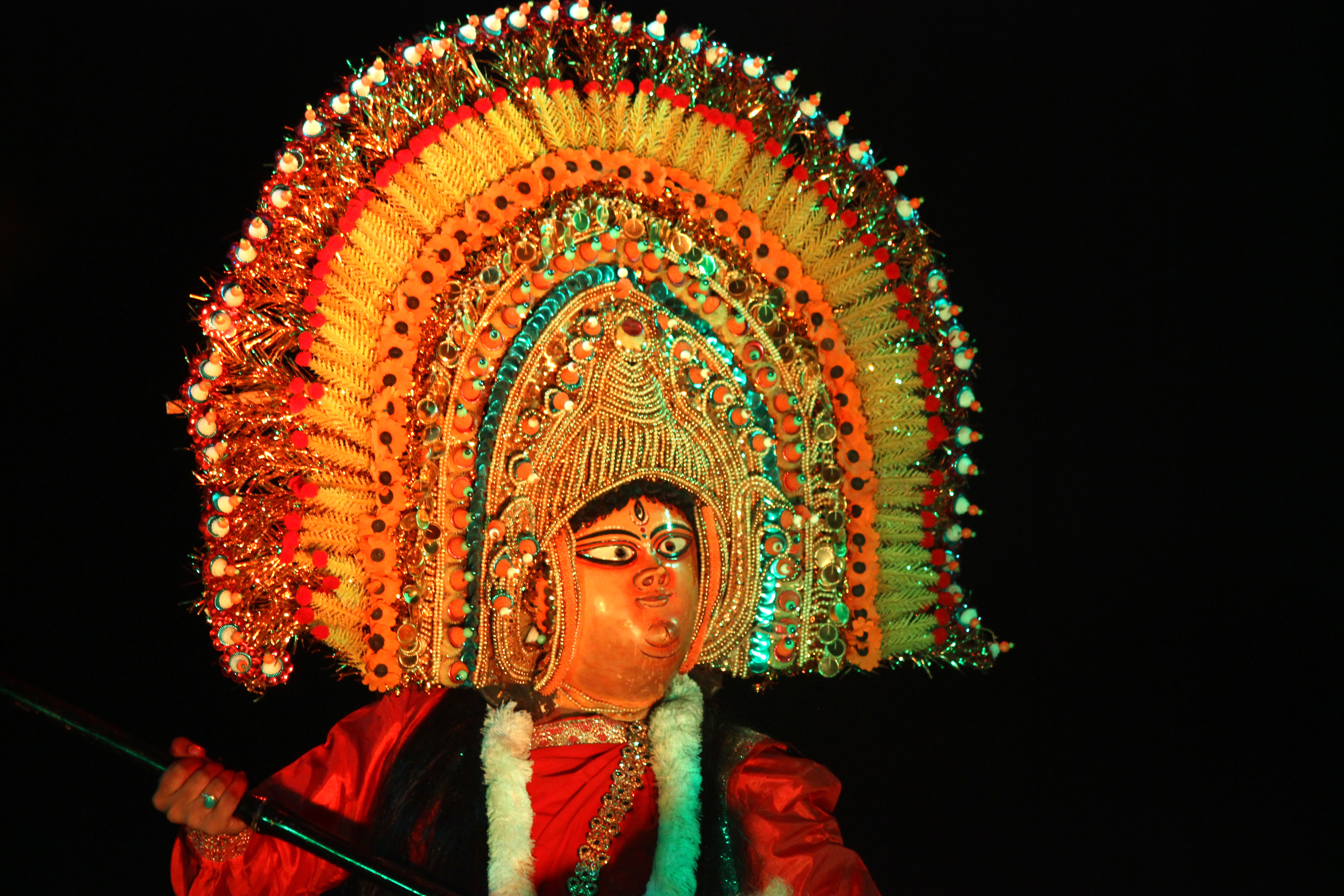
A nari mask showing the face of Durga.

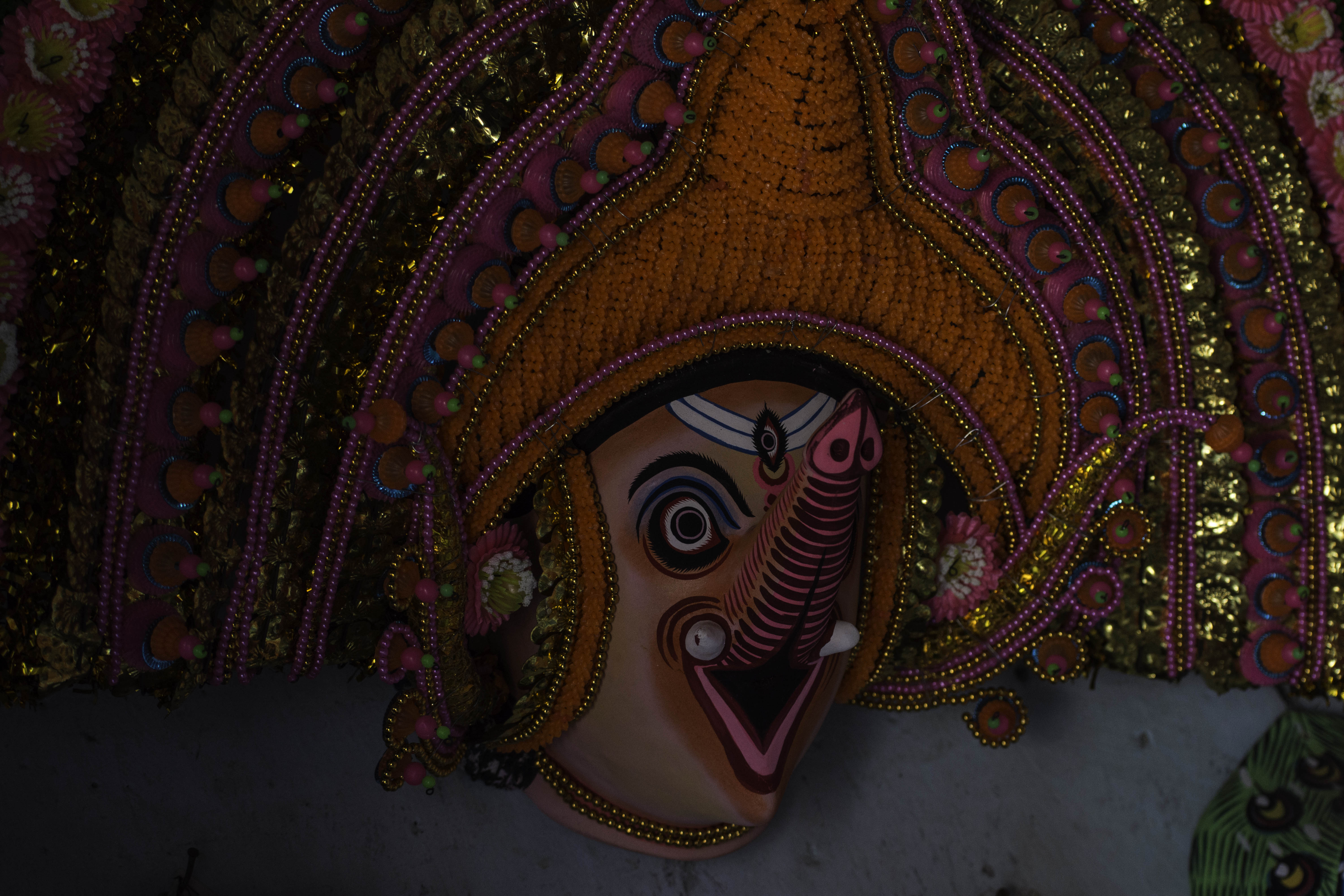
A mask showing the Hindu deity Ganesha. The distinguishing feature is the trunk.

“Each dancer’s mask is unique”, says Anusua Mukherjee while reporting on Charida for The Hindu. The masks are made “according to his or her facial measurements by their trusted craftsmen, who work in close collaboration with the troupes”, Mukherjee adds. In this way, the mask-maker imparts his own understanding of the character which eventually also shapes the dances. There isn’t much scope for experimentation for the masks are stylised but artisans being in their own flavour particularly while painting the eyes of the characters.

Performers use only the full-face masks, but smaller masks are also produced and sold to the art collectors. According to Tsubaki and Richmond, the style of mask-making bears a similarity to the Krishna Nagar School of Painting that had its origins in the Nadia district of West Bengal during the 18th Centuries.

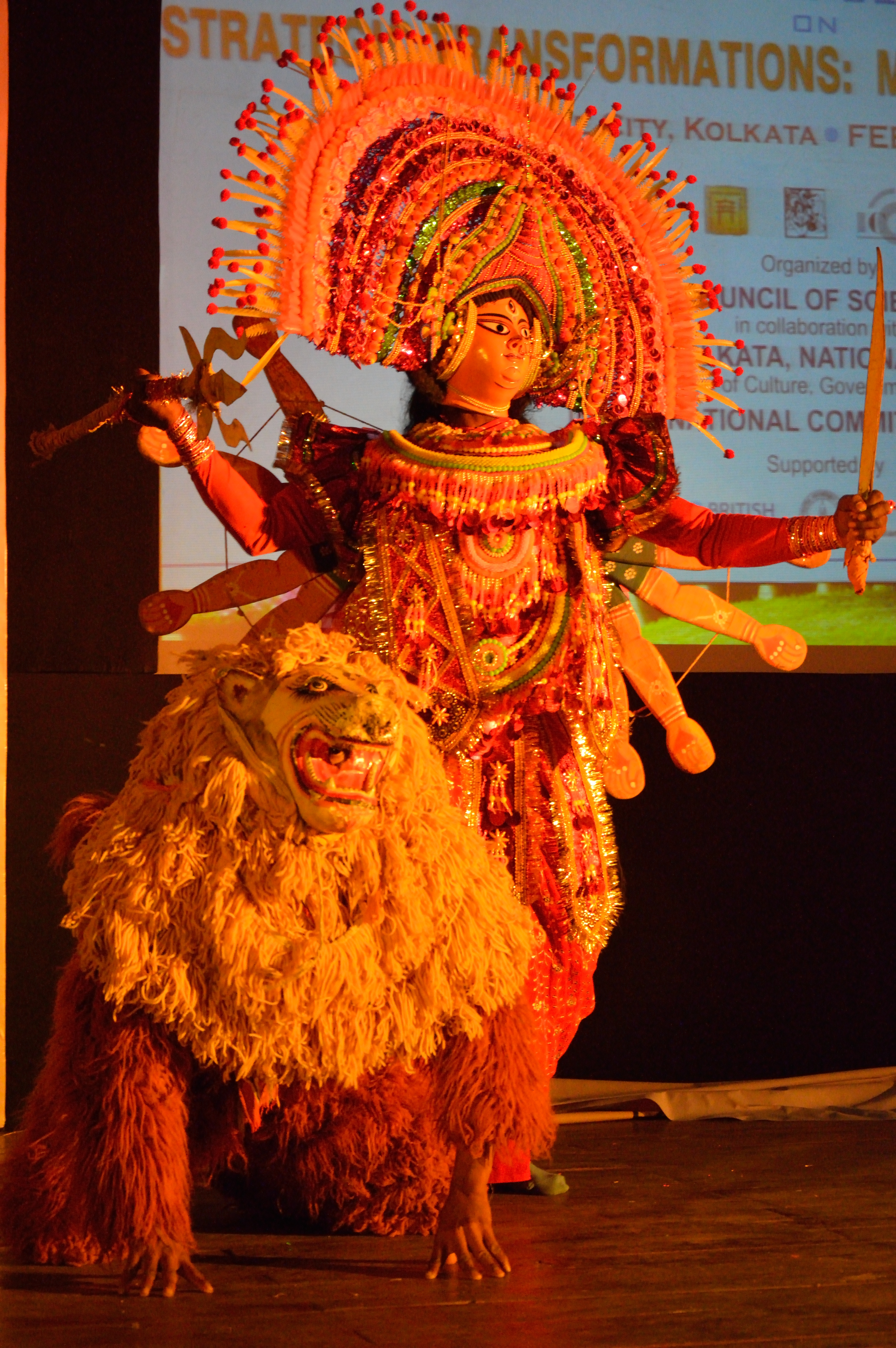
The 'Mahisasuramardini' Chhau recital performed by Purulia's 'Royal Chhau Academy', during an international conference and intensive seminar on 'Strategic Transformations: Museums in 21st Century' organised by the National Council of Science Museums, India in collaboration with Indian Museum, Kolkata, National Museum, New Delhi (Ministry of Culture Govt. of India) and Indian National Committee of ICOM, held at Mini Auditorium, Science City, Kolkata on 13 February 2014. Note the animal mask of the lion, and the nari mask of Durga.

The performance masks are full-face, and covers almost the parietal bone to the base of the back skull which allows for an improved stability especially when halos strung of wire are added around the headgear. The wire frames on the headgear are embellished using coloured beads, sequins, confetti, etc., to evoke the image of the imposing gods and goddesses, grotesque demons, or specific animals which the masks portray. Some of the headdresses weigh up to five kilograms.

For popular Chhau characters, there exist standardised visual conventions. Handsome, yet human-like heroes like Lakshman, Kartik, Arjuna, or Parashurama are painted pink with a black moustache. Lord Krishna sports a blue mask, while Rama has a green one. The Goddesses are mostly pink, and have prominent feminine jewelries such as nose rings, earrings, and vermillion marks drawn on their foreheads. The distinct gods are portrayed with their very specific iconography — for instance Narasingha (the half-lion, half-man avatar of Vishnu) has furious eyes, a very fierce expression and a mane, whole Ganesha has an elephant head, and Shiva’s mask shows a matted hair and a serpent true to the blue god’s representation. On the other hand, a peacock-headed associate, played by another dancer, accompanies Kartik; and Durga is accompanied by a performer who plays the role of Mahishashur wearing a designated demon mask, while another dancer performs the role of the actual bull (Mahishasura is believed to have sprung into the battlefield from a buffalo). Her vahan or vehicle, the lion, is shown wearing a large mask, and an oversized orange fabric that moves and pulsates with movements of the two dancers who make the lion appear larger. The demons usually are shown with fierce eyes fitting with their monstrous features and their faces are painted in black, green or other dark colours.

The artistic capability and spirit of innovation of the mask artists come to the fore when unusual characters have to be made. In recent past, masks of Marvel comic characters such as Green Goblin, Sylvester Stallone, or Wolverine have been created by artists, and these are particularly popular among the non-chhau buyers.

== Manufacture ==
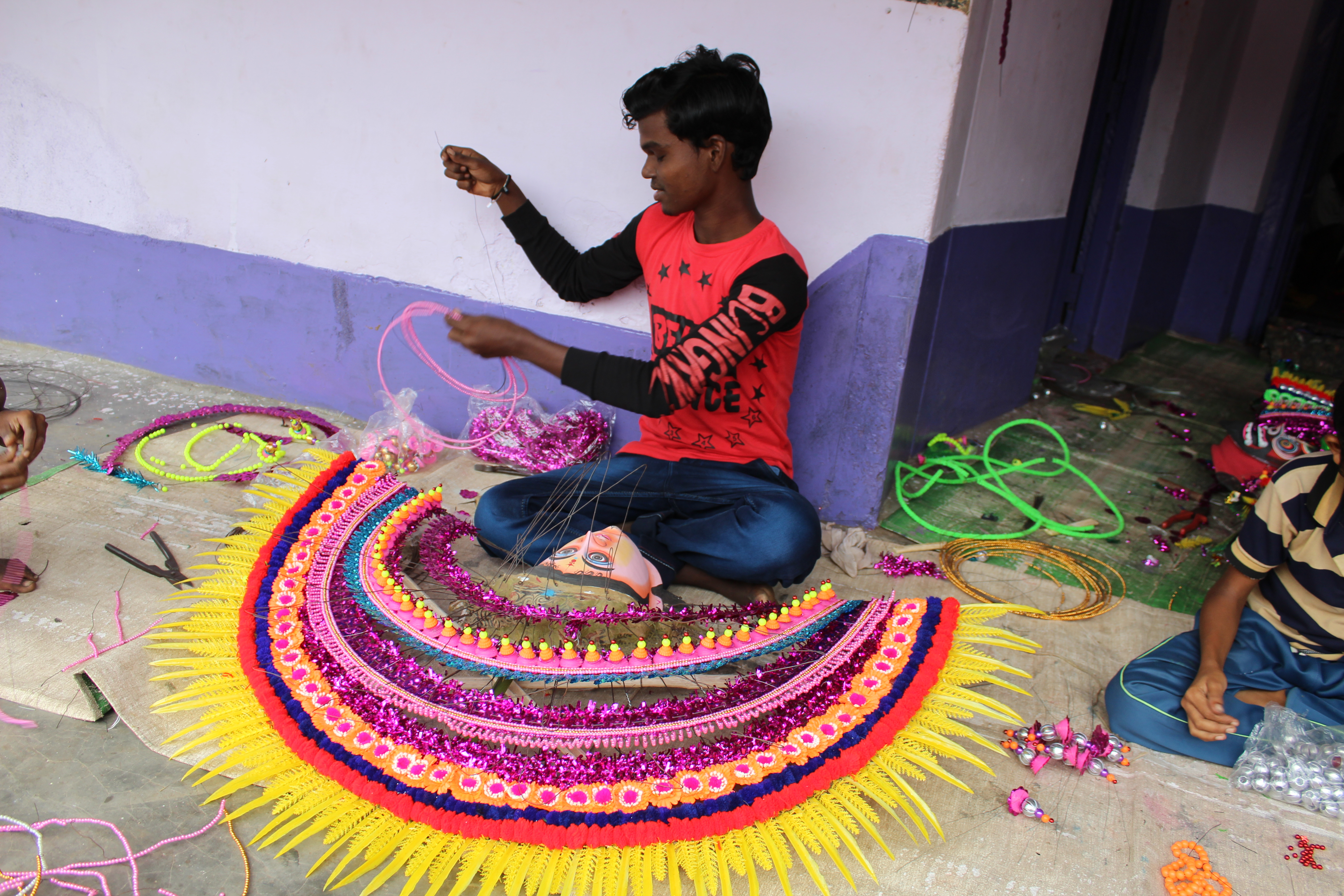
Makers of Chhau masks in the village of Charida, Baghmundi block, Purulia

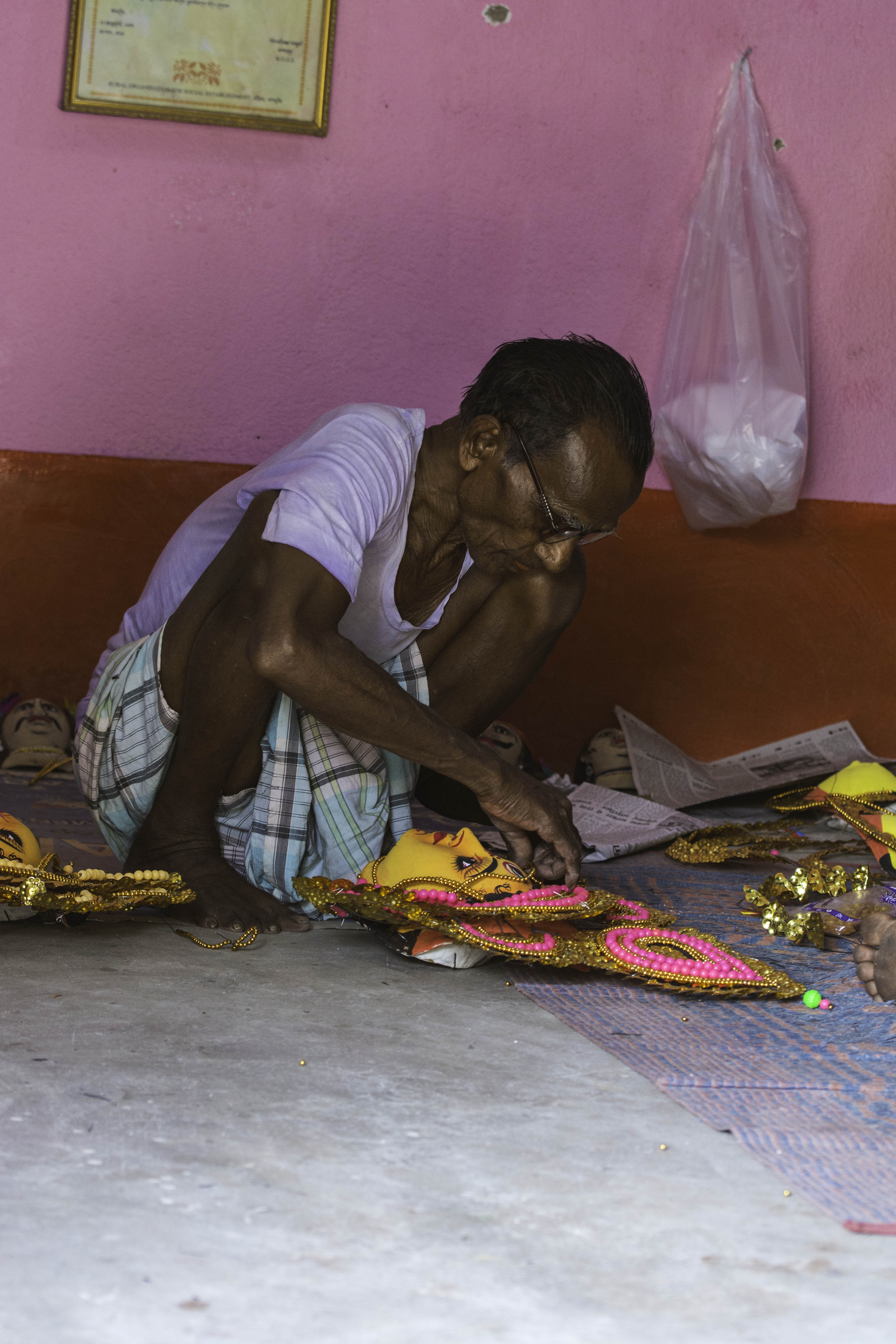
An old artisan busy making masks in his workshop.

Chhau masks are made by artists from the Sutradhar community. The making of a mask goes through various stages. 8–10 layers of soft paper, immersed in diluted glue, are pasted one after another on the mould before the mud mould is dusted with fine ash powder. The facial features are made of clay. A special layer of mud and cloth is applied and the mask is then sun-dried. After this, the mould is polished and a second round of sun drying is done before separating the layers of cloth and paper from the mould. After finishing and drilling of holes for the nose and eyes, the mask is coloured and decorated.

The base of the mask is formed with a wood or a cane, which most mask makers own. After this, the clay is applied to the base and a mould is created. The mould, after it has been dried, is separated from the base and layered with papier mache. The papier mache is smoothened by adding another layer of clay. Lightweight cotton fabrics are also used at times. The making of the base requires roughly about three days, and most of this time is needed for sun-drying. However, before the entire mask dries up completely details such as hair, eyes, eyebrows, etc., are added. The decoration and painting of the masks requires another set of three working days or more. Smaller and simple masks, usually meant to be taken and sold as souvenirs, are painted and decorated within a day.

An engaging video of the mask making process can be accessed here: https://www.daricha.org/video_play.aspx?ID=95 . The video documents how Nepal Chandra Sutradhar demonstrates the art of mask-making in his workshop at Charida.

The clay used for mask-making is sourced from alluvial soil from neighbouring farms, while hair and animal manes are made using jute or acrylic wool. Paint, wire, the sequins, shiny stars, leaves and other decorative items come from the wholesale markets of Kolkata in large quantities. Older masks being sold from the artisan’s collection undergoes what is called polishing: that is the artists add colour to spruce them up. While blow dryers are used to hasten the drying phase so as to meet the clients’ deadline. In Charida, the artists are not just skilled craftsmen but also very able sales people.

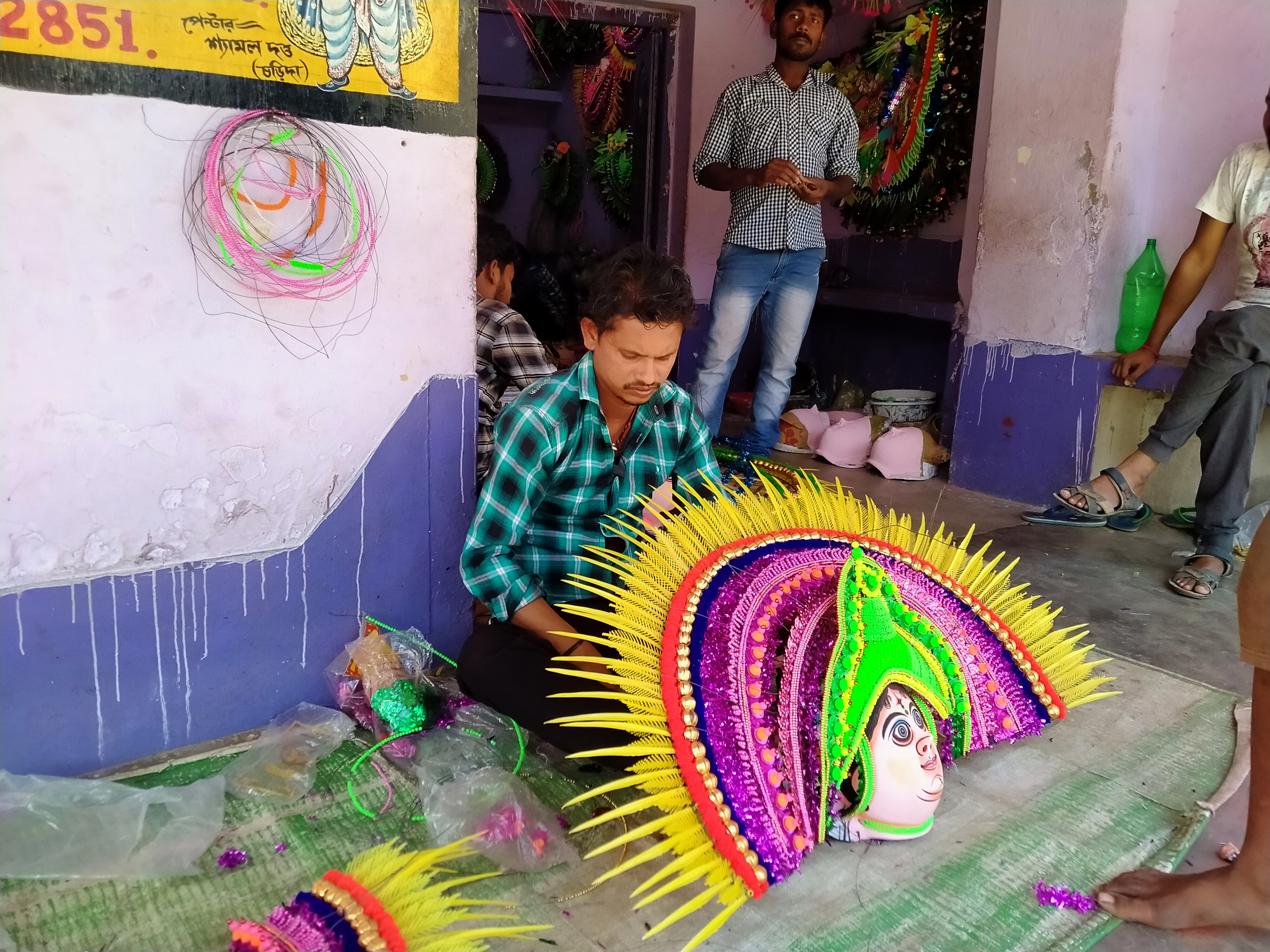
Man making a chhau mask in his workshop at Charida, Purulia.

Masks are commissioned only after a particularly company receives an order/invitation for performance, and an advance payment that enables the company to pay for the masks. For example: in 2017, when the New Star Chhau Dance Group went to perform in Maharashtra, they had commissioned tricolour masks which resembled the Indian flag from Charida artist Manoranjan Sutradhar. They had played the Mahishashur Slayer performances. However, at times, when there is a lack of time or finances, mask-makers work in close association with the dance troupe, modifying older masks and repainting them to meet the current production demands. A typical handsome male mask, used for Kartik, could be easily repainted to show Arjuna; similarly the demon mask also could be easily altered.

== Charida: Where masks are made ==
Charida, located in the Baghmundi block of Purulia, is the centre of making Chhau masks, where nearly every residence along the street becomes a workshop simultaneously. Some even have names like Mukhosh Ghar (House of Masks). The place has been designated as the Bengal government’s Department of Micro, Small and Medium Enterprises & Textiles, in association with UNESCO. Charida is also known as Mukhosh Gram, literally meaning the mask village.

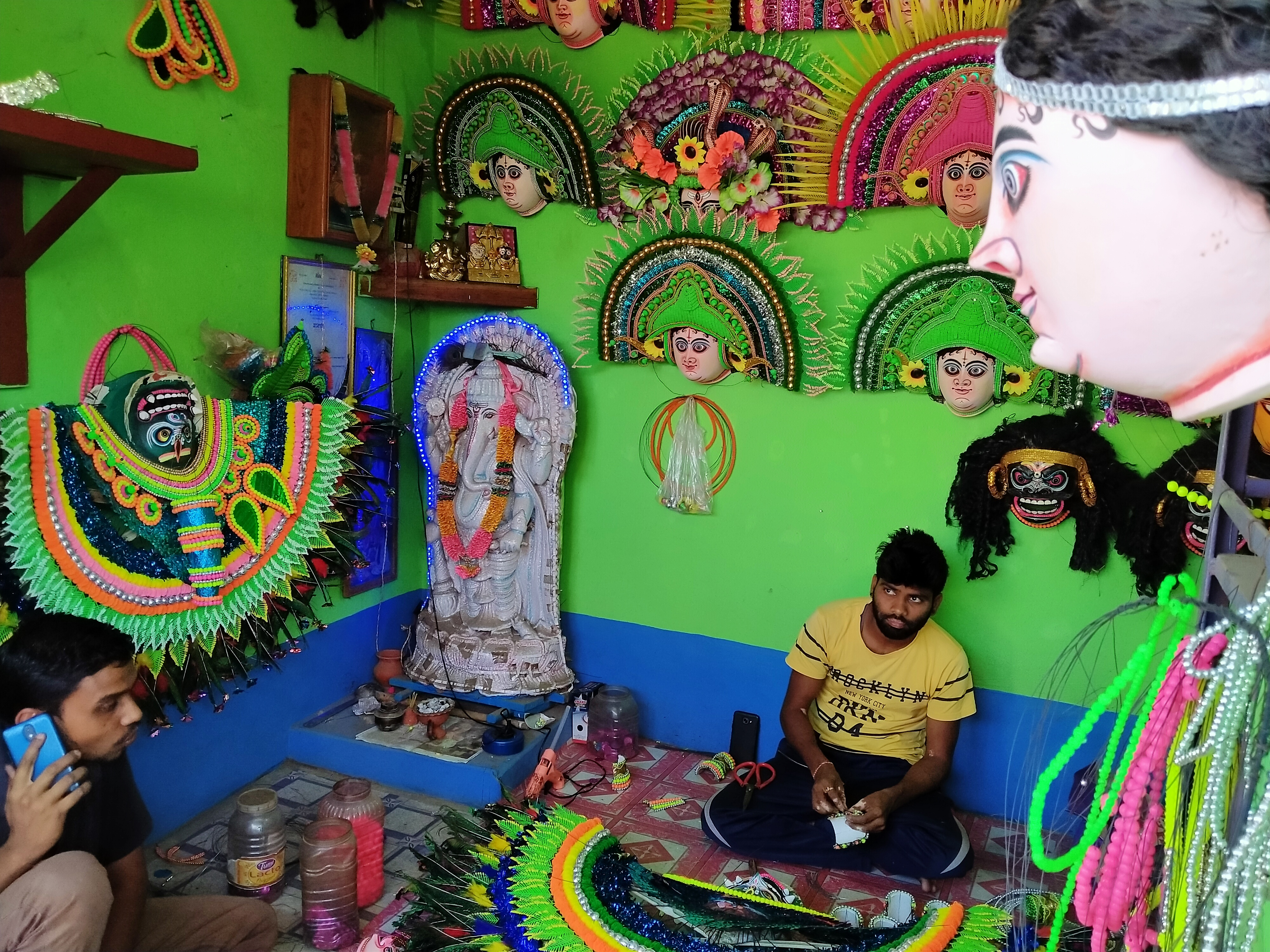
A typical mask shop at Charida.

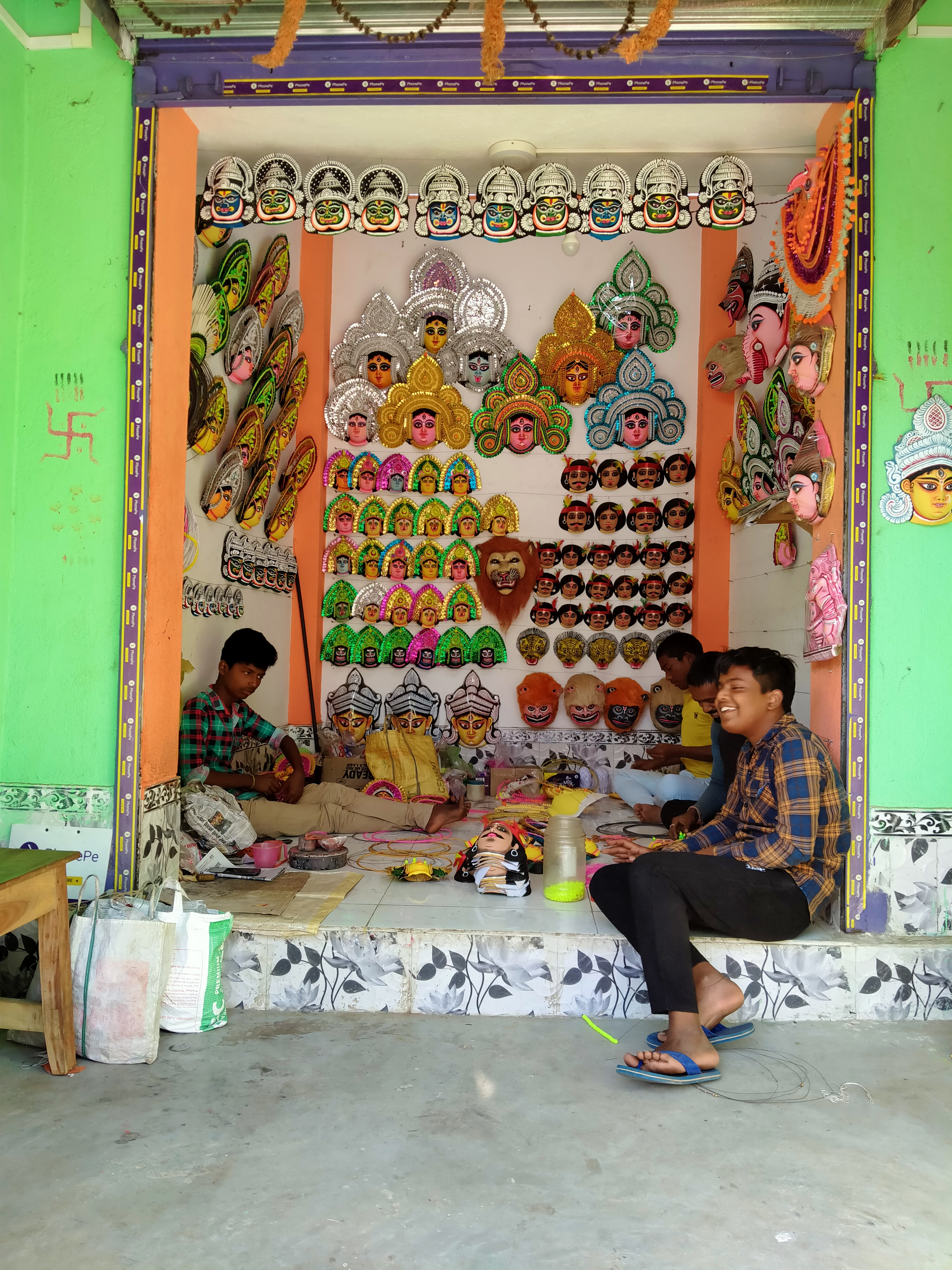
A Chhau Mask-Shop in Charida.

In Charida, mask making is a family business. The place has 300 individuals from 115 families approximately engaged in this art of mask creation. Simple ingredients like clay and paper is used, however the process is slow, detailed and progresses from one step to another. While for the final decorations tinsel, glass beads, zari, plastic flowers, feathers, strips of coloured jute for hair, etc. are used. Even little girls and boys are engaged in this creative process, and this is a way that the art is handed down from one generation to the next.

Mask making is usually carried out in families, where the master craftsman leads the entire process and women do most of the decoration and painting typical of Purulia masks. Traditionally, any form of acknowledgment or national awards for Charida mask making have mostly been given to men.

Gambhir Singh Mura (1930–2002), who was awarded the Padma Shri, brought the name and recognition to the art form for the first time. Performers like Mura are also mask-makers. Mura's statue is found in Charida. There is also a museum in Charida which documents the art and the journey of Purulia Chhau masks. A Chhau mask festival is also held at the village during the time of January–February.

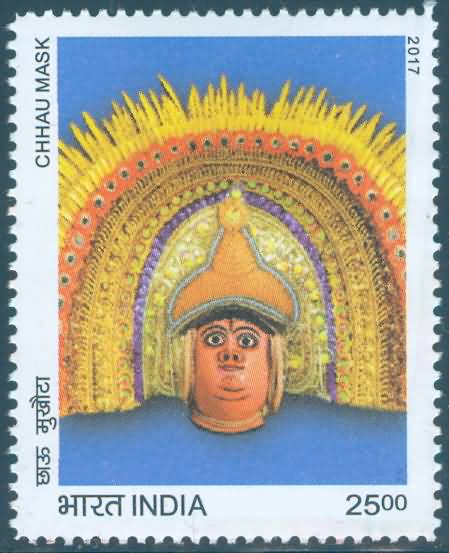
Chhau mask of West Bengal on an Indian stamp, 2017

== Geographical Indication Tag ==
The Chhau mask of Purulia acquired the Geographical Indication (GI) tag in 2018, and was registered in the List of Geographical Indications in India. As the basic difference of Purulia Chhau the mask is unique and traditional craft, and the GI tag has brought increased attention to the craft both from the national and international levels, made the artisan's aware of their rights, and improved their condition as sales and demand for performances have increased.

== See also ==
- Chhau dance
- Arts of West Bengal
- Charida
