= Jargo, Purulia =

Jargo
- Village
- Location in West Bengal, India Jargo (India)
- Coordinates: 23.3105°N 85.8963°E
- Country: India
- State: West Bengal
- District: Purulia

Population (2011)
  - Total: 4,083

Languages
  - Official: Bengali, English
- Time zone: UTC+5:30 (IST)
- PIN: 723212
- Telephone/STD code: 03254
- Lok Sabha constituency: Purulia
- Vidhan Sabha constituency: Baghmundi
- Website: purulia.gov.in
- Places in Jhalda subdivision in Purulia district. Key: M: municipality, C: census town, R: rural/ urban centre, H: historical/ religious centre, X: craft centre, T: tourist centre, △: hills Owing to space constraints in the small map, the locations in the larger map on click through may vary slightly.

Jargo is a village in the Ilu Jargo panchayat in the Jhalda I CD block in the Jhalda subdivision of the Purulia district in the state of West Bengal, India.

== Geography ==
=== Location ===
Jargo is located at 23.3105°N 85.8963°E.

=== Area overview ===
Purulia district forms the lowest step of the Chota Nagpur Plateau. The general scenario is undulating land with scattered hills. Jhalda subdivision, shown in the map alongside, is located in the western part of the district, bordering Jharkhand. The Subarnarekha flows along a short stretch of its western border. It is an overwhelmingly rural subdivision with 91.02% of the population living in the rural areas and 8.98% living in the urban areas. There are 3 census towns in the subdivision. The map alongside shows some of the tourist attractions in the Ajodhya Hills. The area is home to Purulia Chhau dance with spectacular masks made at Charida. The remnants of old temples and deities are found in the subdivision also, as in other parts of the district.

== Demographics ==
According to the 2011 Census of India, Jargo had a total population of 4,083, of which 2,074 (51%) were males and 2,009 (49%) were females. There were 495 persons in the age range of 0–6 years. The total number of literate persons in Jargo was 2,481 (69.15% of the population over 6 years).

== Education ==
Chitta Mahato Memorial College was established in 2010. It is affiliated with the Sidho Kanho Birsha University.

Jargo High School is a Bengali-medium coeducational institution established in 1956. It has facilities for teaching from class V to class XII.
