= Patardi =

Pathardi
- Village
- Location in West Bengal, India Pathardi (India)
- Coordinates: 23°11′02.4″N 86°03′50.4″E
- Country: India
- State: West Bengal
- District: Purulia

Population (2011)
  - Total: 1,609

Languages
  - Official: Bengali, English
- Time zone: UTC+5:30 (IST)
- Telephone/STD code: 03254
- Lok Sabha constituency: Purulia
- Vidhan Sabha constituency: Baghmundi
- Website: purulia.gov.in

Patardi (also spelled as Pathardi and Pathardihi) is a village in the Baghmundi CD block in the Jhalda subdivision of the Purulia district in the state of West Bengal, India.

== Geography ==
Places in Jhalda subdivision in Purulia district
M: municipality, CT: census town, R: rural/ urban centre, H: historical/ religious centre, C: craft centre, T: tourist cetre
Owing to space constraints in the small map, the actual locations in a larger map may vary slightly

=== Location ===
Pathardi lies in the vicinity of the Ajodhya Hill and Forest Reserve Area. It is close to Baghmundi.

The Bagmundi–Bandwan Upland is an area descending from the Ranchi Plateau. At some places the high lands are very steep and rise to heights ranging from 475 to 700 m. The Ajodhya Hills are spread across the Baghmundi and Balarampur areas.

=== Area overview ===
Purulia district forms the lowest step of the Chota Nagpur Plateau. The general scenario is undulating land with scattered hills. Jhalda subdivision, shown in the map alongside, is located in the western part of the district, bordering Jharkhand. The Subarnarekha flows along a short stretch of its western border. It is an overwhelmingly rural subdivision with 91.02% of the population living in the rural areas and 8.98% living in the urban areas. There are 3 census towns in the subdivision. The map alongside shows some of the tourist attractions in the Ajodhya Hills. The area is home to Purulia Chhau dance with spectacular masks made at Charida. The remnants of old temples and deities are found in the subdivision also, as in other parts of the district.

Note: The map alongside presents some of the notable locations in the subdivision. All places marked in the map are linked in the larger full screen map.

== Demographics ==
According to the 2011 Census of India Pathardi had a total population of 1,609 of which 863 (54%) were males and 746 (46%) were females. There were 240 persons in the age range of 0 to 6 years. The total number of literate people in Pathardi was 924 (67.49% of the population over 6 years).

== CD block HQ ==
The headquarters of the Baghmundi CD block are located at Pathardi.

== Healthcare ==
Pathardihi Rural Hospital, with 30 beds at Pathardihi, is the major government medical facility in the Baghmundi CD block.
