= Masina, Purulia =

Masina
- Village
- Location in West Bengal, India Masina (India)
- Coordinates: 23°21′30.6″N 85°57′11.9″E
- Country: India
- State: West Bengal
- District: Purulia

Population (2011)
  - Total: 2,724

Languages
  - Official: Bengali, English
- Time zone: UTC+5:30 (IST)
- Telephone/STD code: 03254
- Lok Sabha constituency: Purulia
- Vidhan Sabha constituency: Baghmundi
- Website: purulia.gov.in
- Places in Jhalda subdivision in Purulia district. Key: M: municipality, C: census town, R: rural/ urban centre, H: historical/ religious centre, X: craft centre, T: tourist centre, △: hills Owing to space constraints in the small map, the locations in the larger map on click through may vary slightly.

Masina is a village in the Jhalda I CD block in the Jhalda subdivision of the Purulia district in the state of West Bengal, India.

== Geography ==
=== Location ===
Masina is located at 23°21′30.6″N 85°57′11.9″E.

=== Area overview ===
Purulia district forms the lowest step of the Chota Nagpur Plateau. The general scenario is undulating land with scattered hills. Jhalda subdivision, shown in the map alongside, is located in the western part of the district, bordering Jharkhand. The Subarnarekha flows along a short stretch of its western border. It is an overwhelmingly rural subdivision with 91.02% of the population living in the rural areas and 8.98% living in the urban areas. There are 3 census towns in the subdivision. The map alongside shows some of the tourist attractions in the Ajodhya Hills. The area is home to Purulia Chhau dance with spectacular masks made at Charida. The remnants of old temples and deities are found in the subdivision also, as in other parts of the district.

== Demographics ==
According to the 2011 Census of India, Masina had a total population of 2,724 of which 1,395 (51%) were males and 1,329 (49%) were females. There were 353 persons in the age range of 0 to 6 years. The total number of literate people in Masina was 1,447 (61.03% of the population over 6 years).

== CD block HQ ==
The headquarters of the Jhalda I CD block are located at Masina.

== Transport ==
A short stretch of local roads link Masina to State Highway 4.

Jhalda railway station, on the Gomoh Muri line, is located nearby.

== Healthcare ==
Jhalda Rural Hospital, with 30 beds, is the major government medical facility in Jhalda I CD block.
