= Jaypur, Purulia =

Joypur
- Census Town
- Location in West Bengal, India Joypur (India)
- Coordinates: 23°25′52.7″N 86°08′57.5″E
- Country: India
- State: West Bengal
- District: Purulia

Area
  - Total: 8.2921 km^{2} (3.2016 sq mi)

Population (2011)
  - Total: 10,259
  - Density: 1,237.2/km^{2} (3,204.3/sq mi)

Languages
  - Official: Bengali, English
- Time zone: UTC+5:30 (IST)
- PIN: 723201
- Telephone code: 03254
- Vehicle registration: WB
- Lok Sabha constituency: Purulia
- Vidhan Sabha constituency: Joypur
- Website: purulia.gov.in
- Places in Jhalda subdivision in Purulia district. Key: M: municipality, C: census town, R: rural/ urban centre, H: historical/ religious centre, X: craft centre, T: tourist centre, △: hills Owing to space constraints in the small map, the locations in the larger map on click through may vary slightly.

Joypur is a census town in the Joypur CD block in the Jhalda subdivision of the Purulia district in the state of West Bengal, India. There is a factory producing muri (puffed rice). To its south at Deulghata are a number of historic religious sites.

== Geography ==
=== Location ===
Joypur is located at 23°25′52.7″N 86°08′57.5″E

=== Area overview ===
Purulia district forms the lowest step of the Chota Nagpur Plateau. The general scenario is undulating land with scattered hills. Jhalda subdivision, shown in the map alongside, is located in the western part of the district, bordering Jharkhand. The Subarnarekha flows along a short stretch of its western border. It is an overwhelmingly rural subdivision with 91.02% of the population living in the rural areas and 8.98% living in the urban areas. There are 3 census towns in the subdivision. The map alongside shows some of the tourist attractions in the Ajodhya Hills. The area is home to Purulia Chhau dance with spectacular masks made at Charida. The remnants of old temples and deities are found in the subdivision also, as in other parts of the district.

== Demographics ==
According to the 2011 Census of India, Joypur had a total population of 10,259 of which 5,344 (52%) were males and 4,915 (49%) were females. There were 1,373 persons in the age range of 0 to 6 years. The total number of literate persons in Jaypur was 5,893 (66.32% of the population over 6 years).

== Civic Administration ==
=== Police station ===
Joypur police station has jurisdiction over the Joypur CD block. The area covered is 230.5 km^{2} (89.0 sq mi) and the population covered is 133,240. It has 52 km (32 mi) of inter-state borders with Jaridih, Balidih and Pindrajora police stations in Bokaro district of Jharkhand.

== Infrastructure ==
According to the District Census Handbook 2011, Puruliya, Jaypur covered an area of 8.2921 km^{2} (3.2016 sq mi). There is a railway station at Garh Joypur. Among the civic amenities, the protected water supply has tap water from treated sources. It had 757 domestic electric connections. Among the medical facilities it had dispensary/ health centre, maternity and child welfare centres and maternity home, nursing home, veterinary hospital 0.5 km (0.31 mi) away and two medicine shops in the town. Among the educational facilities it had were three primary schools, two senior secondary schools, one general degree college. It had one non-formal education centre (Sarbya Siksha Abhiyan Centre). Among the social, recreational and cultural facilities it had one public library, and one reading room. Important commodities it produced were cock industry products and muri (puffed rice). It had the branch of one nationalised bank and one cooperative bank.

== Transport ==
State Highway 4A running from Tulin to Chas Morh (both in the Purulia district) passes through this block.

There is a station at Garh Jaipur on the Purulia-Kotshila branch line of the South Eastern Railway.

== Education ==
Bikramjeet Goswmi Memorial College was established in 2009. Affiliated with the Sidho Kanho Birsha University, it offers honours courses in Bengali, English, history and philosophy, and a general course in arts.

== Culture ==
Deulghata, some 6 km (3.7 mi) south of Joypur, once had 15 temples and some small shrines, built around the 9th-10th century. The Archaeological Survey of India has taken over the place that includes three tall surviving temples.

== Healthcare ==
Joypur Rural Hospital, with 30 beds, is a major government medical facility in Joypur CD block.
