= Joypur, Purulia =

Joypur
- Community development block
- Coordinates: 23°26′00″N 86°08′00″E
- Country: India
- State: West Bengal
- District: Purulia
- Parliamentary constituency: Purulia
- Assembly constituency: Joypur

Area
  - Total: 230.47 km^{2} (88.98 sq mi)
- Elevation: 312 m (1,024 ft)

Population (2011)
  - Total: 133,349
  - Density: 578.60/km^{2} (1,498.6/sq mi)
- Time zone: UTC+5.30 (IST)
- PIN: 723201 (Garh Jaipur)
- Telephone/STD code: 03254
- Vehicle registration: WB-55, WB-56
- Literacy Rate: 57.94
- Website: http://www.joypurblock.in/

Joypur is a community development block (CD block) that forms an administrative division in the Jhalda subdivision of the Purulia district in the Indian state of West Bengal.

== History ==
=== Background ===
The Jaina Bhagavati-Sutra of the 5th century AD mentions that Purulia was one of the sixteen mahajanapadas and was a part of the kingdom known as Vajra-bhumi in ancient times. In 1833, the Manbhum district was carved out of the Jungle Mahals district, with headquarters at Manbazar. In 1838, the headquarters was transferred to Purulia. After independence, when Manbhum district was a part of Bihar, efforts were made to impose Hindi on the Bengali-speaking majority of the district and it led to the Bengali Language Movement (Manbhum). In 1956, the Manbhum district was partitioned between Bihar and West Bengal under the States Reorganization Act and the Bihar and West Bengal (Transfer of Territories) Act 1956.

=== Red corridor ===
106 districts spanning 10 states across India, described as being part of the left wing extremism activities, constitutes the Red corridor. In West Bengal the districts of Paschim Medinipur, Bankura, Purulia and Birbhum are part of the Red corridor. However, as of July 2016, there had been no reported incidents of Maoist related activities from these districts for the previous 4 years.

The CPI (Maoist) extremism affected CD blocks in Purulia district were: Jhalda I, Jhalda II, Arsha, Baghmundi, Balarampur, Barabazar, Manbazar II and Bandwan. Certain reports also included the Manbazar I and Joypur CD blocks and some times indicted the whole of the Purulia district.

The Lalgarh movement, which started attracting attention after the failed assassination attempt on Buddhadeb Bhattacharjee, then chief minister of West Bengal, in the Salboni area of the Paschim Medinipur district, on 2 November 2008 and the police action that followed, had also spread over to these areas. The movement was not just a political struggle but an armed struggle that concurrently took the look of a social struggle. A large number of CPI (M) activists were killed. Although the epi-centre of the movement was Lalgarh, it was spread across 19 police stations in three adjoining districts – Paschim Medinipur, Bankura and Purulia, all thickly forested and near the border with Jharkhand. The deployment of the CRPF and other forces started on 11 June 2009. The movement came to an end after the 2011 state assembly elections and change of government in West Bengal. The death of Kishenji, the Maoist commander, on 24 November 2011, was the last major landmark.

== Geography ==
CD blocks in Purulia district

Joypur is located at 23°26′00″N 86°08′00″E.

The Joypur CD block is bounded by the Chas CD block, in the Bokaro district of Jharkhand, on the north and a part of the east, the Purulia I CD block, on the east, the Arsha CD block on the south and the Jhalda II CD block and the Kasmar and Jaridih CD blocks, in the Bokaro district of Jharkhand, on the west.

The Joypur CD block is located in the western part of the district. The Kangsabati River forms the boundary between the Joypur and Arsha CD blocks. The upper Kangsabati basin has undulating land and the elevation rises from 200 to 300 m and the general slope is from west to east and south-east.

The Joypur CD block has an area of 230.47 km^{2}. It has 1 panchayat samity, 7 gram panchayats, 90 gram sansads (village councils), 113 mouzas, 109 inhabited villages and 1 census town. Joypur police station serves this block. Headquarters of this CD block is at Joypur.

Gram panchayats of the Joypur CD block/panchayat samiti are: Baragram, Ghagra, Joypur, Mukundapur, Ropo, Sidhi-Jamra and Upar-Kahan.

== Demographics ==
=== Population ===
According to the 2011 Census of India, the Joypur CD block had a total population of 133,349, of which 123,090 were rural and 10,259 were urban. There were 68,977 (52%) males and 64,372 (48%) females. There were 21,079 persons in the age range of 0 to 6 years. The Scheduled Castes numbered 19,162 (14.37%) and the Scheduled Tribes numbered 13,074 (9.80%).

According to the 2001 census, the Joypur CD block had a total population of 111,715, out of which 58,132 were males and 53,583 were females. The Joypur block registered a population growth of 17.97 per cent during the 1991-2001 decade. Decadal growth for Purulia district was 13.96 per cent. Decadal growth in West Bengal was 17.84 per cent.

Census towns in the Joypur CD block are (2011 census figures in brackets): Joypur (10,259).

Large villages (with 4,000+ population) in the Joypur CD block are (2011 census figures in brackets): Sidhi (4,665) and Barbenda (5,107).

Other villages in the Joypur CD block are (2011 census figures in brackets): Mukundpur (2,076), Baragram (2,811), Rop (3,340), Jamra (1,591), Gaghra (1,993) and Upar Kahan (2,960).

=== Literacy ===
According to the 2011 census, the total number of literate persons in the Joypur CD block was 65,044 (57.94% of the population over 6 years) out of which males numbered 41,848 (72.06% of the male population over 6 years) and females numbered 23,196 (42.80% of the female population over 6 years). The gender disparity (the difference between female and male literacy rates) was 29.26%.

See also – List of West Bengal districts ranked by literacy rate

Literacy in CD blocks of
Purulia district
Purulia Sadar subdivision
Arsha – 57.48%
Balarampur – 60.40%
Hura – 68.79%
Purulia I – 78.37%
Purulia II – 63.39%
Manbazar subdivision
Barabazar – 63.27
Bandwan – 61.38%
Manbazar I – 63.78%
Manbazar II – 60.27%
Puncha – 68.14%
Jhalda subdivision
Baghmundi – 57.17%
Jhalda I – 66.18%
Jhalda II – 54.76%
Joypur – 57.94%
Raghunathpur subdivision
Para – 65.62%
Raghunathpur I – 67.36%
Raghunathpur II – 67.29%
Neturia – 65.14%
Santuri – 64.15%
Kashipur – 71.06%
2011 Census: CD Block Wise

Primary Census Abstract Data

=== Language and religion ===
Religion in Joypur CD block (2011)
Hinduism	74.57%
Other (tribal religion)	15.53%
Islam	9.58%
Other or not stated	0.32%

In the 2011 census, Hindus numbered 99,441 and formed 74.57% of the population in the Joypur CD block. Muslims numbered 12,769 and formed 9.58% of the population. Others numbered 21,139 and formed 15.85% of the population. Others include Addi Bassi, Marang Boro, Santal, Saranath, Sari Dharma, Sarna, Alchchi, Bidin, Sant, Saevdharm, Seran, Saran, Sarin, Kheria, and other religious communities. In 2001, Hindus were 87.11%, Muslims 8.76% and tribal religions 3.96% of the population respectively.

Languages of Joypur CD block (2011)
1. Bengali (69.4%)
2. Kurmali (21.7%)
3. Santali (6.97%)
4. Others (1.86%)

At the time of the 2011 census, 69.43% of the population spoke Bengali, 21.74% Kurmali and 6.97% Santali as their first language.

== Rural Poverty ==
According to the Rural Household Survey in 2005, 32.85% of total number of families were BPL families in Purulia district. According to a World Bank report, as of 2012, 31-38% of the population in Purulia, Murshidabad and Uttar Dinajpur districts were below poverty level, the highest among the districts of West Bengal, which had an average 20% of the population below poverty line.

== Economy ==
=== Livelihood ===
Livelihood
in Joypur CD block
1. Cultivators (29.5%)
2. Agricultural labourers (30.1%)
3. Household industries (12.4%)
4. Other Workers (28.0%)

In the Joypur CD block in 2011, among the class of total workers, cultivators numbered 15,230 and formed 29.47%, agricultural labourers numbered 15,541 and formed 30.07%, household industry workers numbered 6,425 and formed 12.43% and other workers numbered 14,479 and formed 28.02%. Total workers numbered 51,675 and formed 38.75% of the total population, and non-workers numbered 81,674 and formed 61.25% of the population.

Note: In the census records a person is considered a cultivator, if the person is engaged in cultivation/ supervision of land owned by self/government/institution. When a person who works on another person's land for wages in cash or kind or share, is regarded as an agricultural labourer. Household industry is defined as an industry conducted by one or more members of the family within the household or village, and one that does not qualify for registration as a factory under the Factories Act. Other workers are persons engaged in some economic activity other than cultivators, agricultural labourers and household workers. It includes factory, mining, plantation, transport and office workers, those engaged in business and commerce, teachers, entertainment artistes and so on.

=== Infrastructure ===
There are 109 inhabited villages in the Joypur CD block, as per the District Census Handbook, Puruliya, 2011, 107 villages (98.17%) have power supply. 107 villages (98.17%) have drinking water supply. 21 villages (19.27%) have post offices. 89 villages (81.65%) have telephones (including landlines, public call offices and mobile phones). 23 villages (21.10%) have pucca (paved) approach roads and 29 villages (26.61%) have transport communication (includes bus service, rail facility and navigable waterways). 2 villages (1.83%) have agricultural credit societies and 7 villages (6.42%) have banks.

=== Agriculture ===
In 2013-14, persons engaged in agriculture in the Joypur CD block could be classified as follows: bargadars 0.79%, patta (document) holders 18.13%, small farmers (possessing land between 1 and 2 hectares) 6.27%, marginal farmers (possessing land up to 1 hectare) 29.91% and agricultural labourers 44.91%.

In 2013-14, the total area irrigated in the Joypur CD block was 4,372.98 hectares, out of which 300 hectares were by canals, 2,866.6 hectares by tank water, 66.38 hectares by river lift irrigation, 124.20 hectares by open dug wells and 715.80 hectares by other means.

In 2013-14, the Joypur CD block produced 23,025 tonnes of Aman paddy, the main winter crop from 10,593 hectares. It also produced maize, maskalai, mustard and potatoes.

=== Banking ===
In 2013-14, the Joypur CD block had offices of 5 commercial banks and 1 gramin bank.

=== Backward Regions Grant Fund ===
The Purulia district is listed as a backward region and receives financial support from the Backward Regions Grant Fund. The fund, created by the Government of India, is designed to redress regional imbalances in development. As of 2012, 272 districts across the country were listed under this scheme. The list includes 11 districts of West Bengal.

== Transport ==
In 2013-14, the Joypur CD block had 3 originating/ terminating bus routes.

State Highway 4A running from Tulin to Chas Morh (both in the Purulia district) passes through this block.

The NSC Bose Gomoh-Hatia line and Purulia-Kotshila branch line of the South Eastern Railway pass through this CD block and there are stations at Chas Road, Garh Joypur and Pundag.

== Education ==
In 2013-14, the Joypur CD block had 116 primary schools with 13,991 students, 21 middle schools with 1,433 students, 1 high school with 561 students and 9 higher secondary schools with 11,974 students. Joypur CD Block had 2 general colleges with 708 students and 179 institutions with 7,972 students for special and non-formal education.

See also – Education in India

According to the 2011 census, in Joypur CD block, amongst the 109 inhabited villages, 13 villages did not have a school, 32 villages had two or more primary schools, 18 villages had at least 1 primary and 1 middle school and 10 villages had at least 1 middle and 1 secondary school.

Ananda Marga College was established in 1966 at Ananda Nagar, Pundag.

Bikramjeet Goswami Memorial College was established at Joypur in 2009.

Ramkrishna Mahato Government Engineering College (earlier known as Purulia Government Engineering College) was established at Agharpur in 2016.

== Culture ==
Ruins of three identical Bholababa temples are located at Boram, near Jaipur.

== Healthcare ==
In 2014, the Joypur CD block had 1 block primary health centre and 3 primary health centres with total 44 beds and 3 doctors. 5,122 patients were treated indoor and 222,090 patients were treated outdoor in the health centres and subcentres of the CD Block.

Joypur Rural Hospital, with 30 beds at Joypur, is the major government medical facility in the Joypur CD block. There are primary health centres at Baragram (with 4 beds), Sidhi (with 4 beds) and Darikuri (with 10 beds).
