= Chhau, Udaipurwati =

Village in Rajasthan, India

Coordinates: 27.9483°N 75.4633°E

Chhau is a village in Udaipurwati tehsil in Jhunjhunu district in the Indian state of Rajasthan.

== Demographics ==
As of 2011, the total population of village is 2470 of which 1229 are males while 1241 are females.

== Literacy ==
As of 2011, the literacy rate was 74.91% compared to 66.11% of Rajasthan.
