= Gambhir Singh Mura =

Indian dancer (1930–2002)

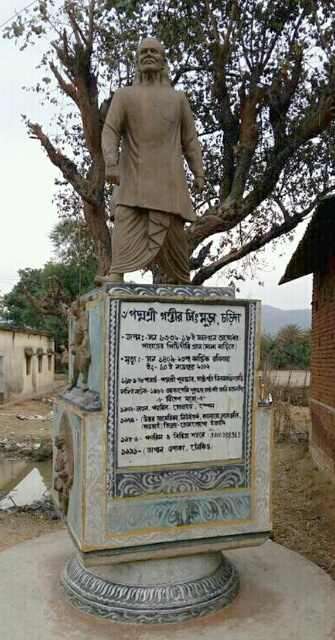
- Statue of Gambhir Singh Mura
- Born: 2 March 1930; Pitikiri Bamni, Purulia, West Bengal, India
- Died: 9 November 2002 (aged 71–72)
- Occupation: Tribal dancer
- Known for: Chhau dance
- Parent: Jipa Singh Mura
- Awards: Padma Shri

Gambhir Singh Mura (1930 – 9 November 2002) was an Indian tribal dancer known for his contributions to the tribal martial dance of Chhau. He was an exponent of the Purulia school of Chhau.

Mura was born in a tribal family to Jipa Singh Mura at Pitikiri Bamni village in Purulia district in the Indian state of West Bengal. He performed in many places such as England, France, Japan and USA. The Government of India awarded him the fourth highest Indian civilian honour of Padma Shri in 1981.

== See also ==
- Chhau dance
