= Baghmundi =

- Village
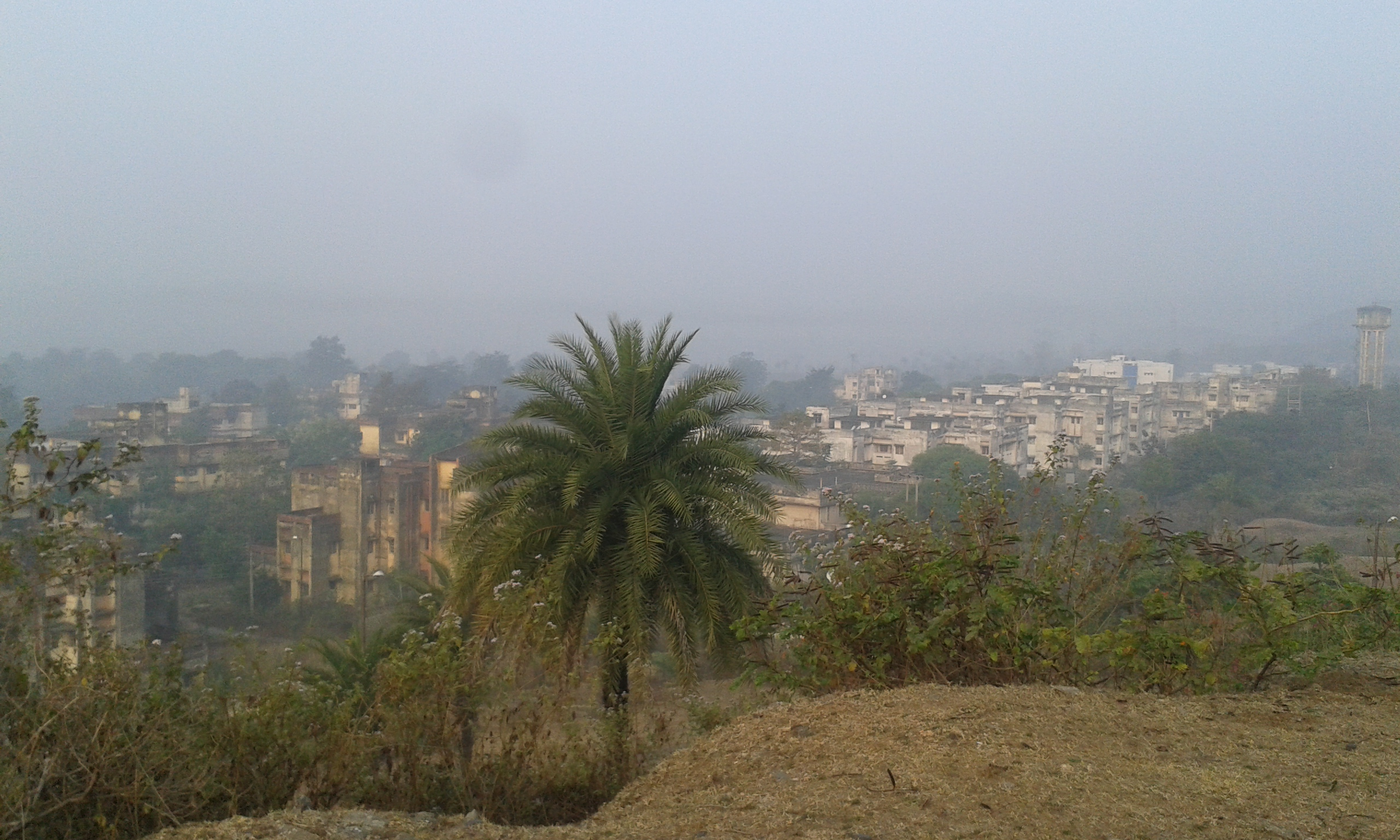
- A view of Baghmundi town

- Location in West Bengal, India Baghmundi (India)
- Coordinates: 23°12′N 86°03′E
- Country: India
- State: West Bengal
- District: Purulia

Languages
  - Official: Bengali, English
- Time zone: UTC+5:30 (IST)
- PIN: 723152 (Baghmundi)
- Telephone code: 03254
- Lok Sabha constituency: Purulia
- Vidhan Sabha constituency: Baghmundi
- Website: purulia.gov.in

Baghmundi is a village, with a police station, in the Baghmundi CD block in the Jhalda subdivision of the Purulia district in the state of West Bengal, India.

== Geography ==
=== Location ===
Places in Jhalda subdivision in Purulia district
Key: M: municipality, C: census town, R: rural/ urban centre, H: historical/ religious centre, X: craft centre, T: tourist centre, △: hills
(Owing to space constraints in the small map, the locations in the larger map on click through may vary slightly.)

Baghmundi lies in the vicinity of the Ajodhya Hill and Forest Reserve Area.

The Bagmundi–Bandwan Upland is an area descending from the Ranchi Plateau. At some places the high lands are very steep and rise to heights ranging from 475 to 700 m (1,558 to 2,297 ft). The Ajodhya Hills are spread across the Baghmundi and Balarampur areas.

=== Area overview ===
Purulia district forms the lowest step of the Chota Nagpur Plateau. The general scenario is undulating land with scattered hills. Jhalda subdivision, shown in the map alongside, is located in the western part of the district, bordering Jharkhand. The Subarnarekha flows along a short stretch of its western border. It is an overwhelmingly rural subdivision with 91.02% of the population living in the rural areas and 8.98% living in the urban areas. There are 3 census towns in the subdivision. The map alongside shows some of the tourist attractions in the Ajodhya Hills. The area is home to Purulia Chhau dance with spectacular masks made at Charida. The remnants of old temples and deities are found in the subdivision also, as in other parts of the district.

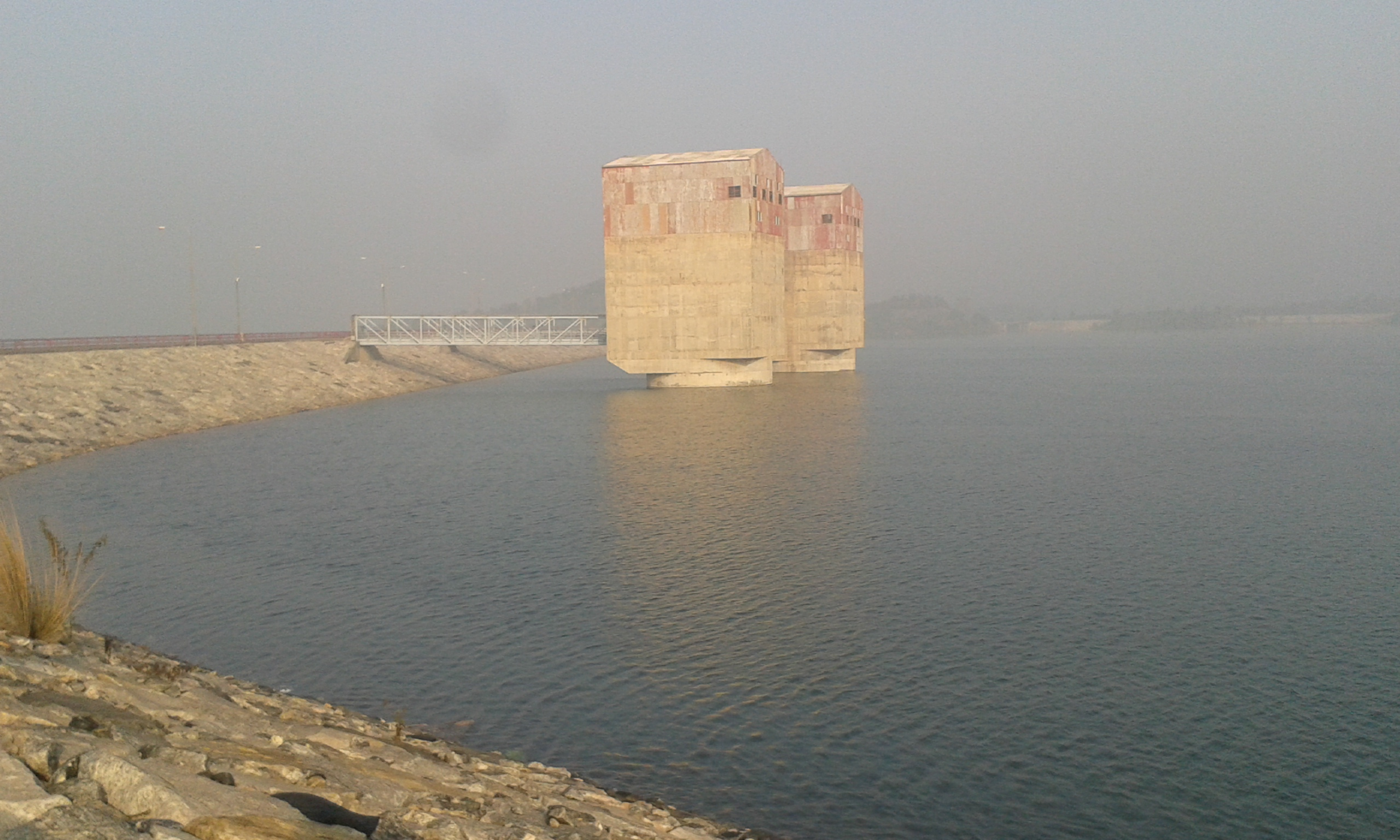
Ajodhya Hill Upper Dam

== Demographics ==
As per 2011 Census of India Baghmundi had a total population of 4,035 of which 2,095 (52%) were males and 1,940 (48%) were females. Population below 6 years was 561. The total number of literates in Baghmundi was 2,340 (67.36% of the population over 6 years).

== Police station ==
Baghmundi police station has jurisdiction over Baghmundi CD Block. The area covered is 275 km^{2} (106 sq mi) and the population covered is 135,530. It has 41.91 km (26.04 mi) inter-state border with Tiruldih and Nimdih police stations in Seraikella-Kharswan district and Sonahitu PS in Ranchi district of Jharkhand.

== Transport ==
SH 4 running from Jhalda (in Purulia district) to Junput (in Purba Medinipur district) passes through Baghmundi. The nearest rail connection is Barabhum railway station under Adra railway division. There is a road from Baghmundi to Sirkabad going over the Ajodhya Hills.
