= Charida =

- Village
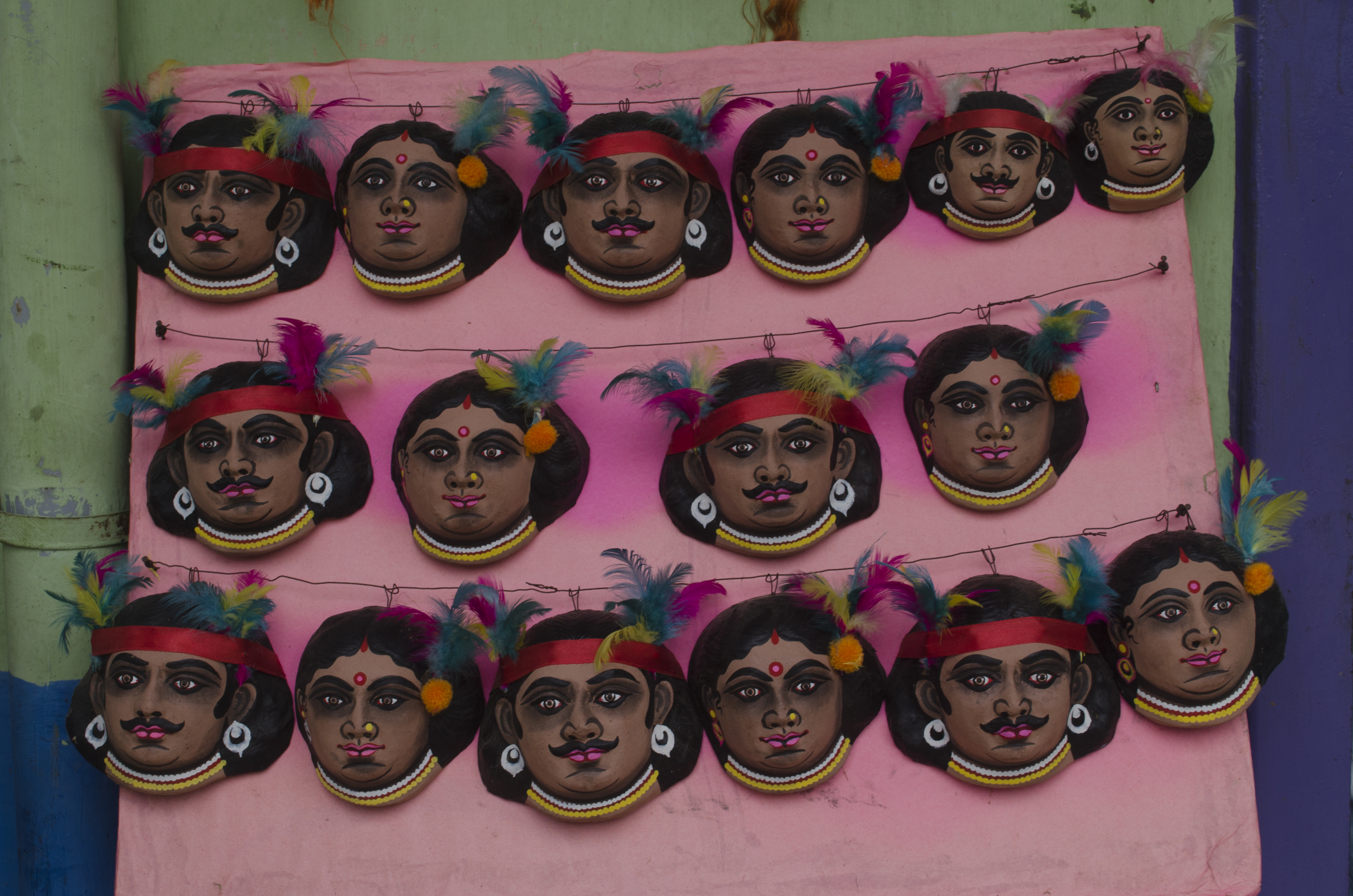
- Masks at Charida

- Location in West Bengal, India Charida (India)
- Coordinates: 23.2046°N 86.0314°E
- Country: India
- State: West Bengal
- District: Purulia

Population (2011)
  - Total: 2,568

Languages
  - Official: Bengali, English
- Time zone: UTC+5:30 (IST)
- PIN: 723152
- Telephone/STD code: 03254
- Lok Sabha constituency: Purulia
- Vidhan Sabha constituency: Baghmundi
- Website: purulia.gov.in
- Places in Jhalda subdivision in Purulia district. Key: M: municipality, C: census town, R: rural/ urban centre, H: historical/ religious centre, X: craft centre, T: tourist centre, △: hills Owing to space constraints in the small map, the locations in the larger map on click through may vary slightly.

Charida (also referred to as Chorida, Chorda) is a village in the Baghmundi CD block in the Jhalda subdivision of the Purulia district in the state of West Bengal, India.

== Geography ==
=== Location ===
Charida is located at 23.2046°N 86.0314°E.

Charida is about 5 km from Baghmundi village, at the scenic foothills of the Ajodhya Hills.

=== Area overview ===
Purulia district forms the lowest step of the Chota Nagpur Plateau. The general scenario is undulating land with scattered hills. Jhalda subdivision, shown in the map alongside, is located in the western part of the district, bordering Jharkhand. The Subarnarekha flows along a short stretch of its western border. It is an overwhelmingly rural subdivision with 91.02% of the population living in the rural areas and 8.98% living in the urban areas. There are 3 census towns in the subdivision. The map alongside shows some of the tourist attractions in the Ajodhya Hills. The area is home to Purulia Chhau dance with spectacular masks made at Charida. The remnants of old temples and deities are found in the subdivision also, as in other parts of the district.

== Demographics ==
According to the 2011 Census of India, Chorda had a total population of 2,568, of which 1,353 (53%) were males and 1,215 (47%) were females. There were 385 persons in the age range of 0–6 years. The total number of literate persons in Chorda was 1,416 (64.86% of the population over 6 years).

== Culture ==
Charida is famous for the Chhau masks used in the Purulia Chhau dance. Around 150 families are involved in mask-making. It involves five elaborate processes and depending on the intricacies involved it takes two to seven days to complete a mask. "The Chhau craft itself dates back 150 years, to the reign of King Madan Mohan Singh Deo of Baghmundi". A chau mask festival is organised at Charida in January–February. Some of the craftsmen have travelled to far off places such as Japan and France "to showcase their work and popularise Chhau."

"The Kirat-Kiratin avtar of Shiva and Durga is the inspiration" behind the Chhau mask. Apart from their traditional use in the Purulia chhau dance, the masks have become a drawing room show piece. Traditionally, only people of lower castes were involved in mask making but the growing demand of the item is drawing in people from all castes into this profession.

Gambhir Singh Mura, an outstanding Chhau dancer and a Padma Shri awardee, belonged to the nearby village of Pitikiri Bamni. Now, his statue adorns Charida.

== Charida picture gallery ==
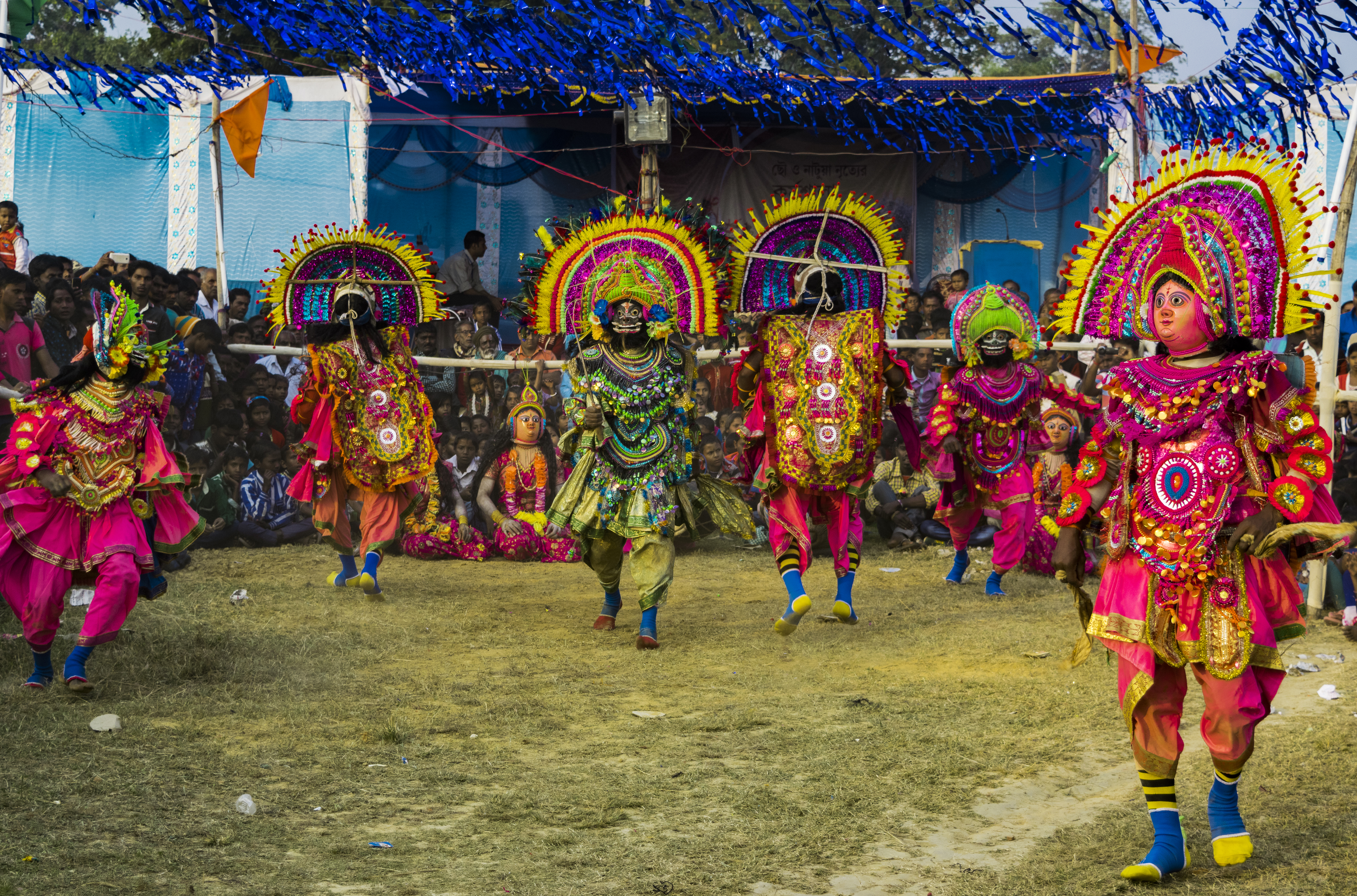
Chhau performance

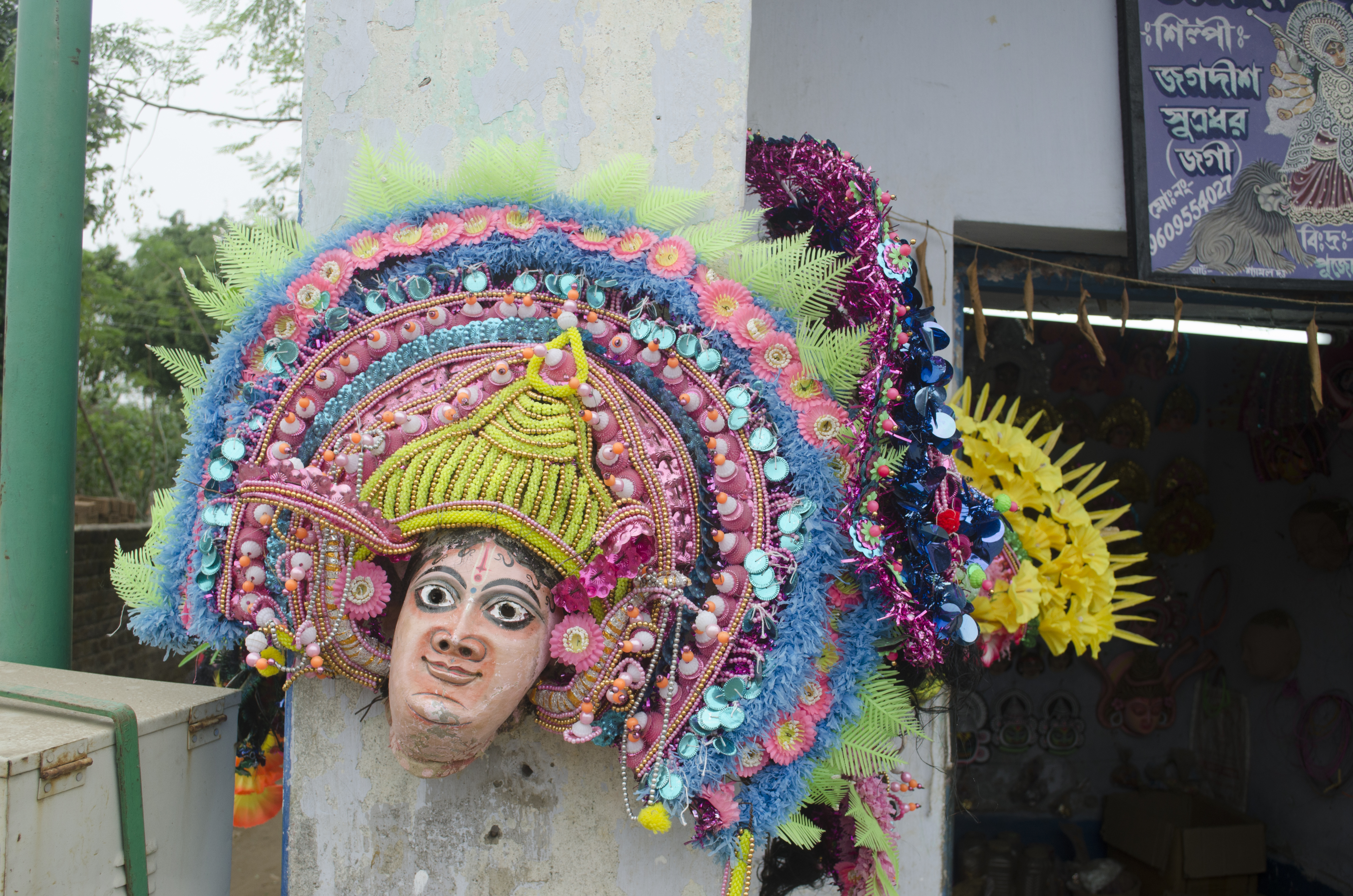
A chhau mask

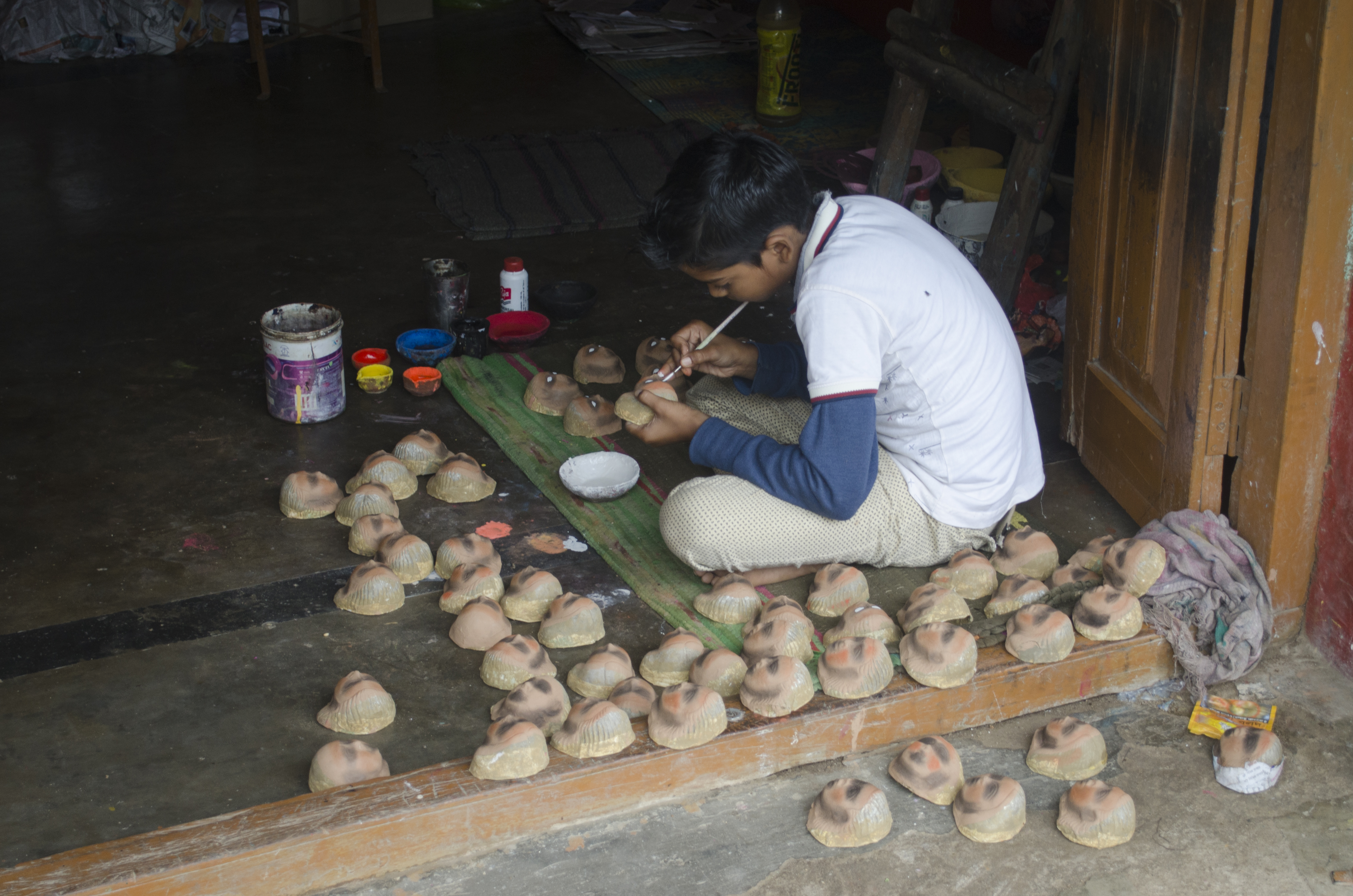
The preliminary stage of mask-making

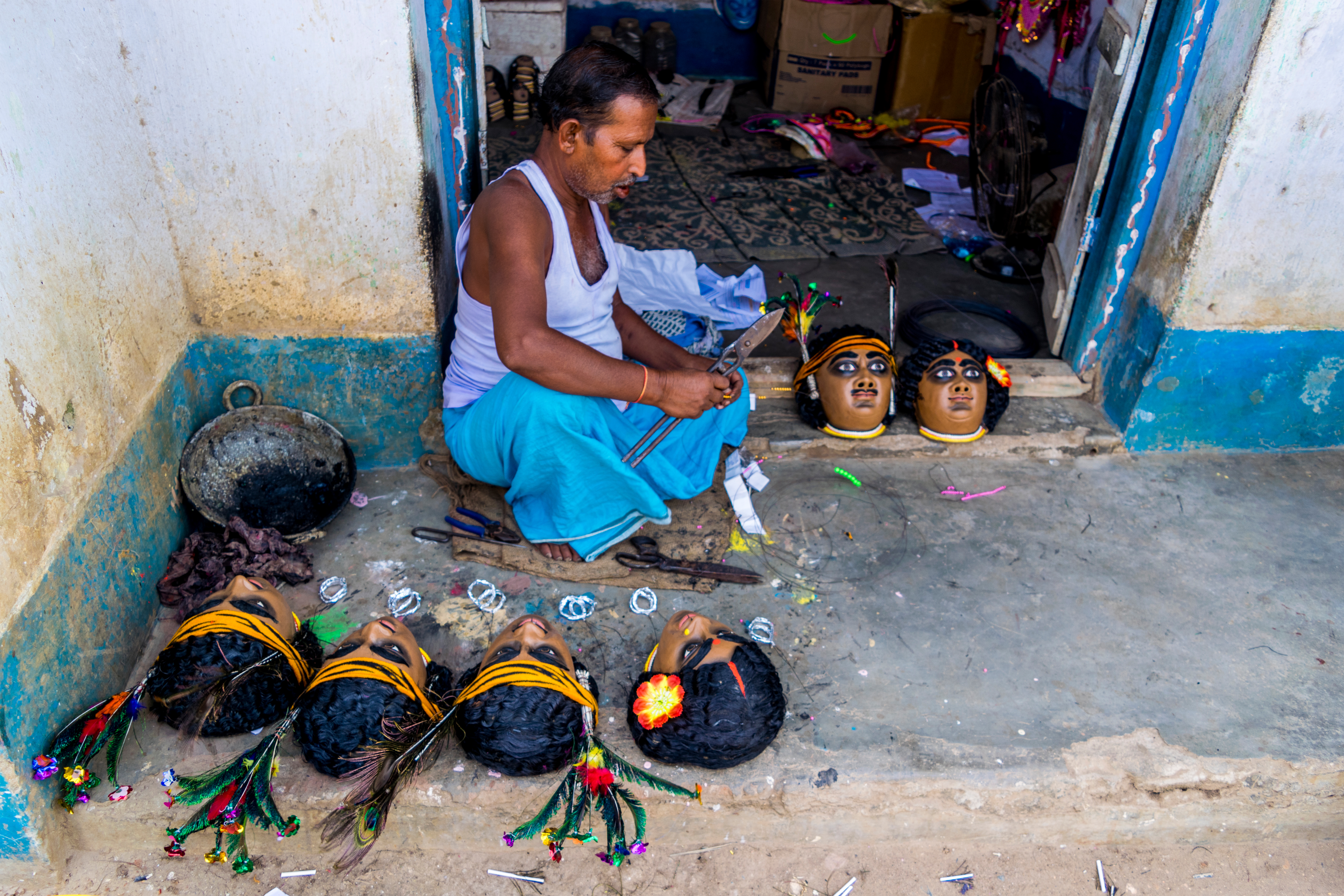
The advanced stage of mask making

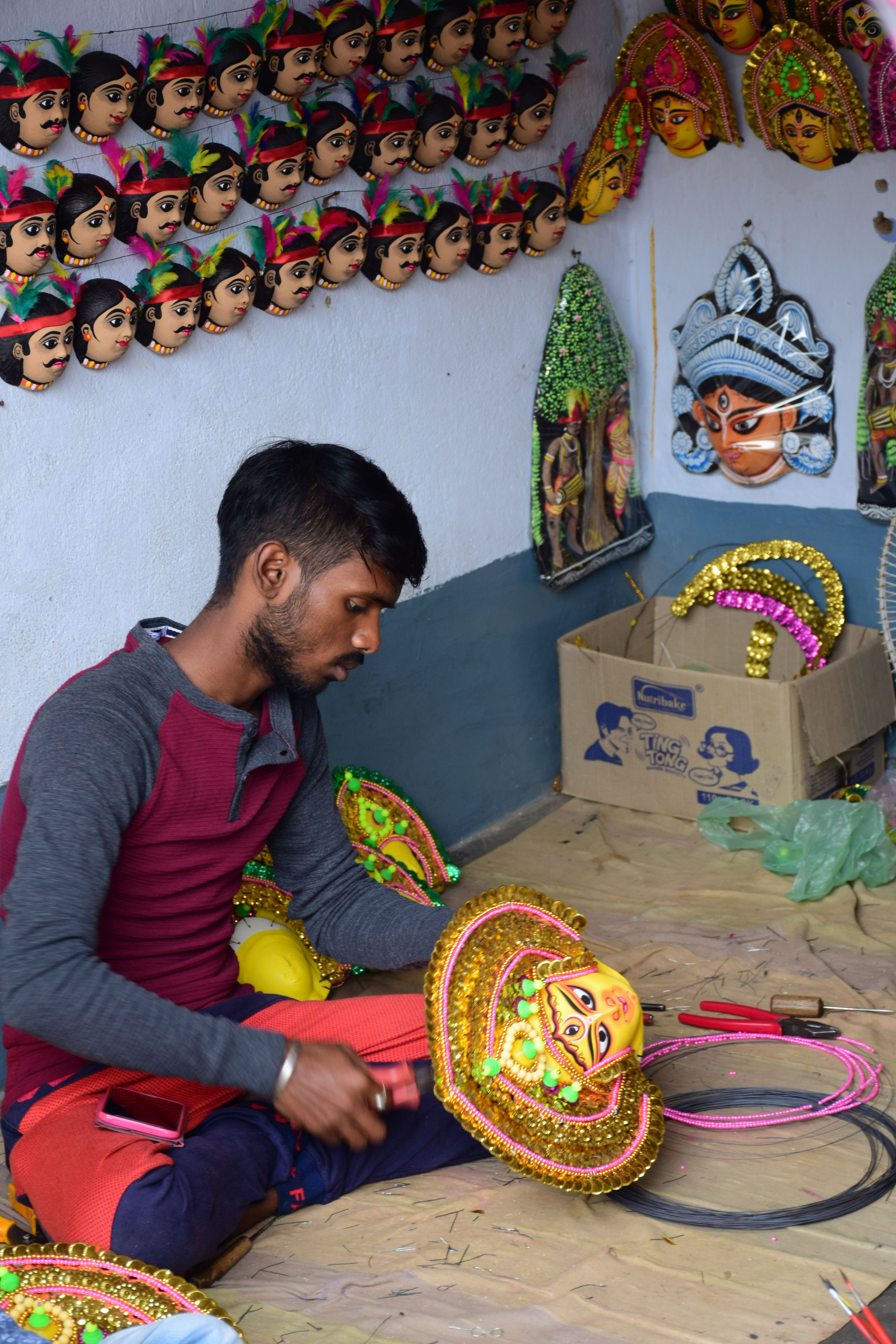
Providing finishing touches

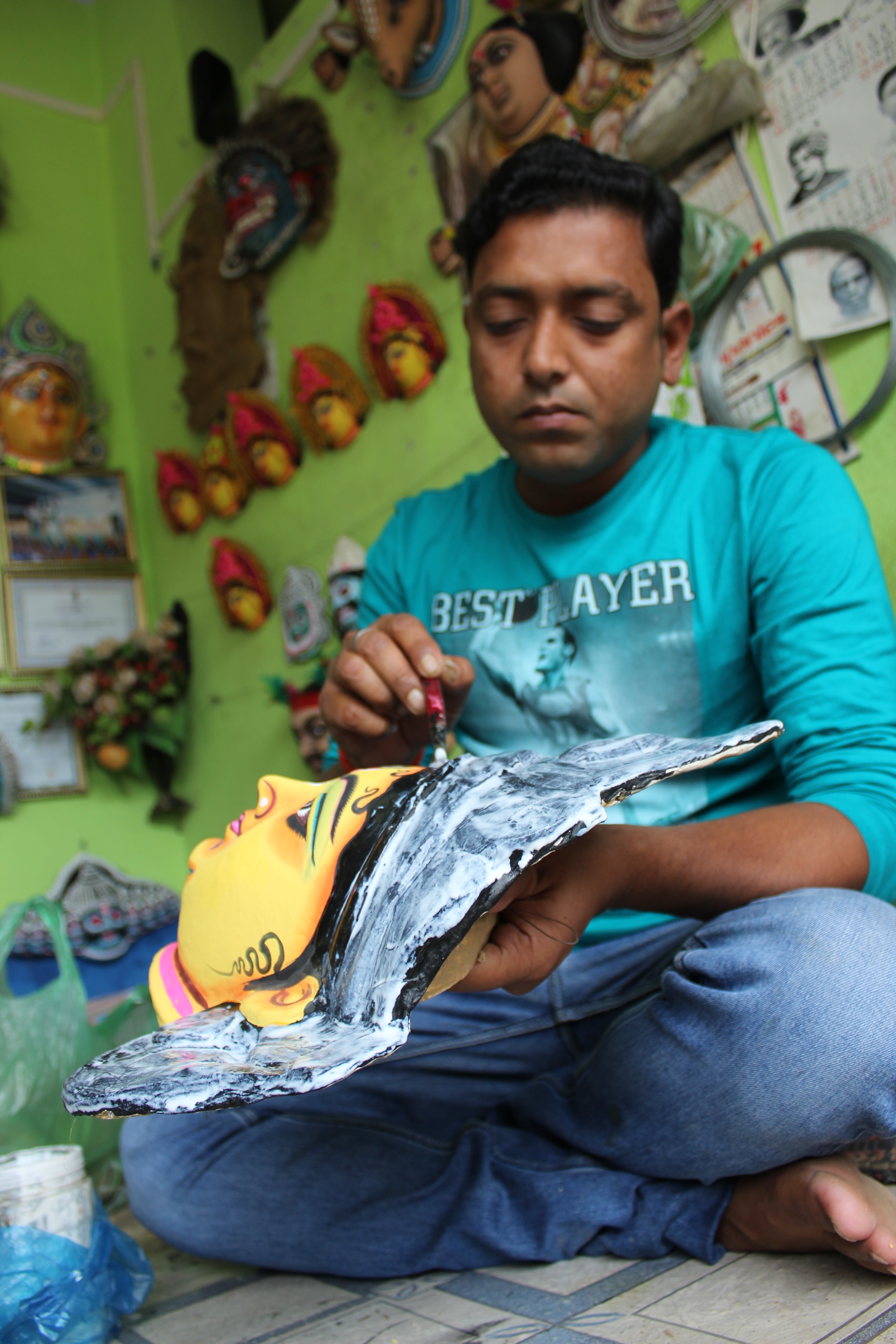
An artist at work

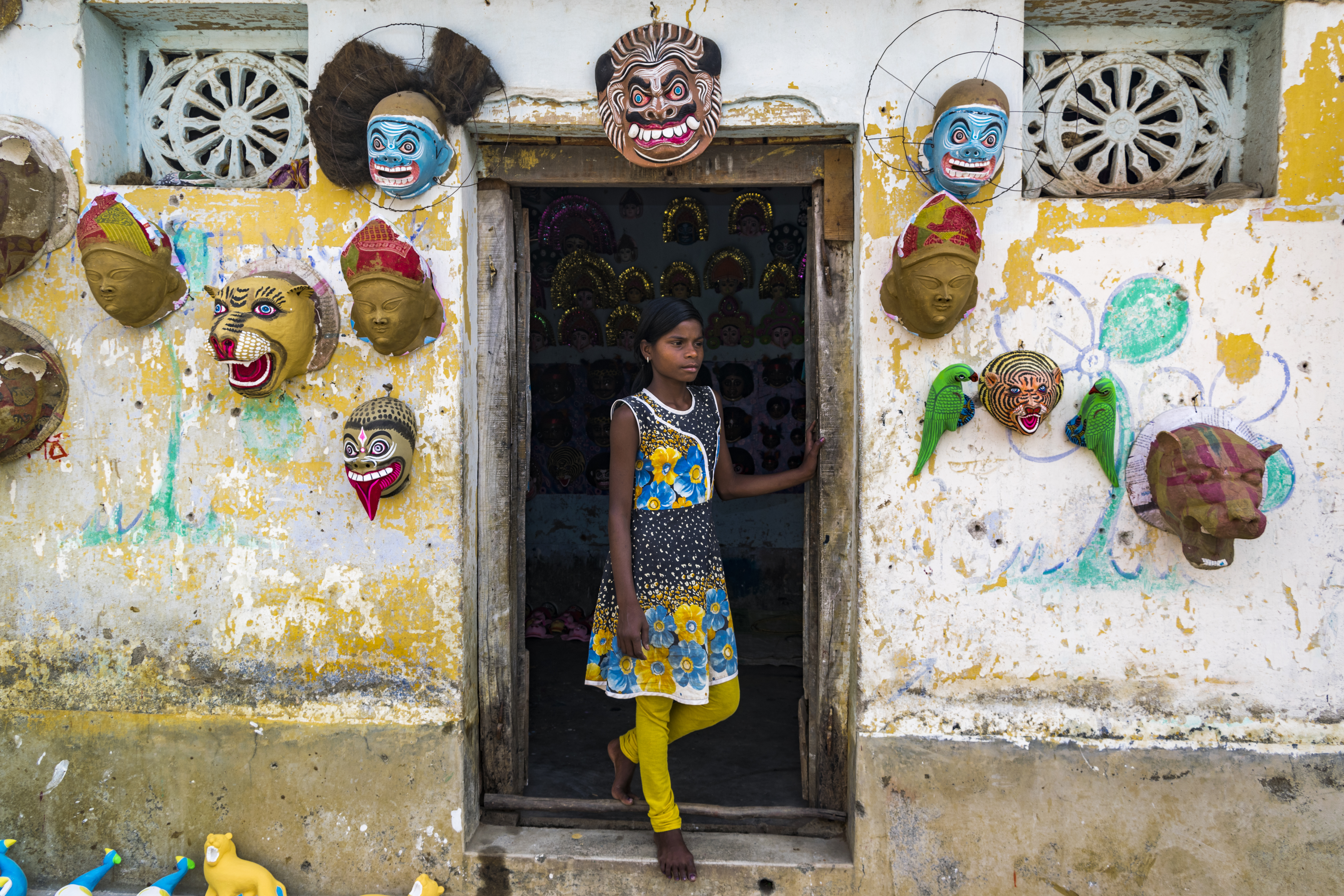
Masks on sale

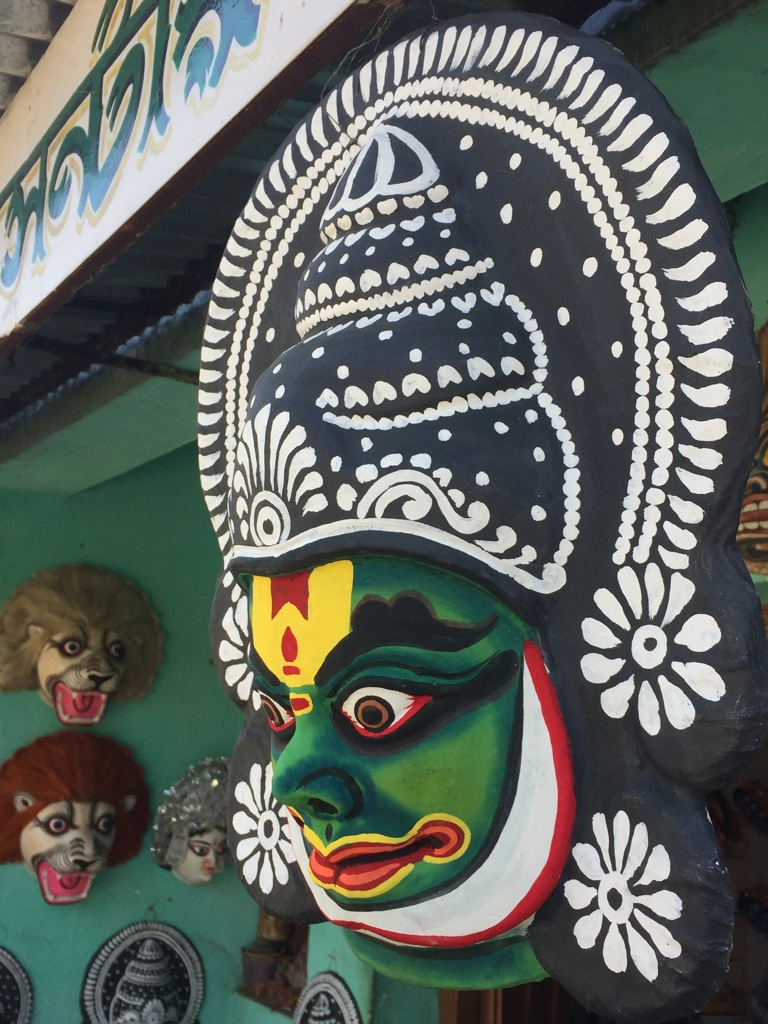
Charida mask

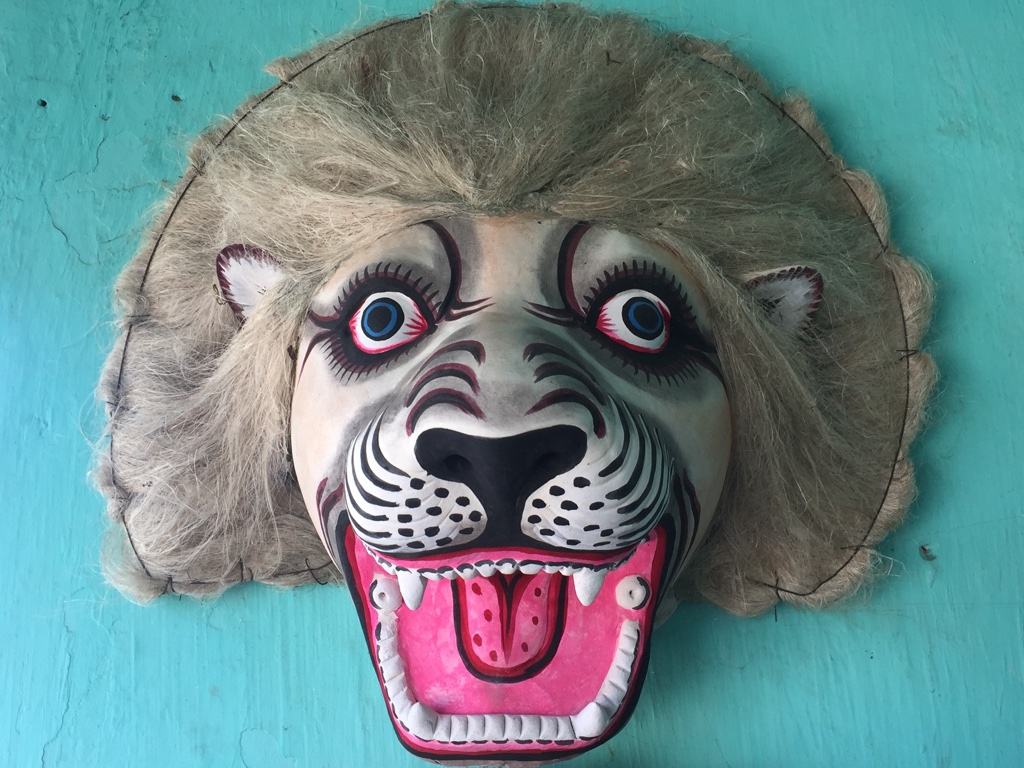
Charida mask

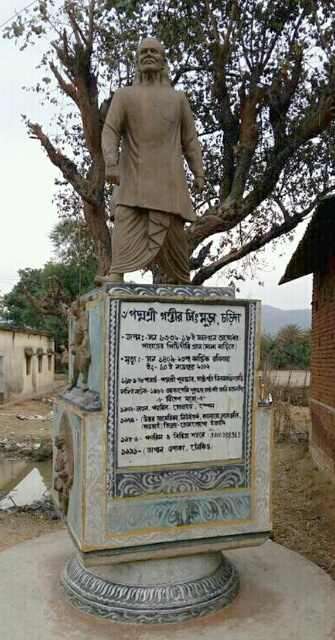
Statue of Gambhir Singh Mura
