= Kotshila =

- Village
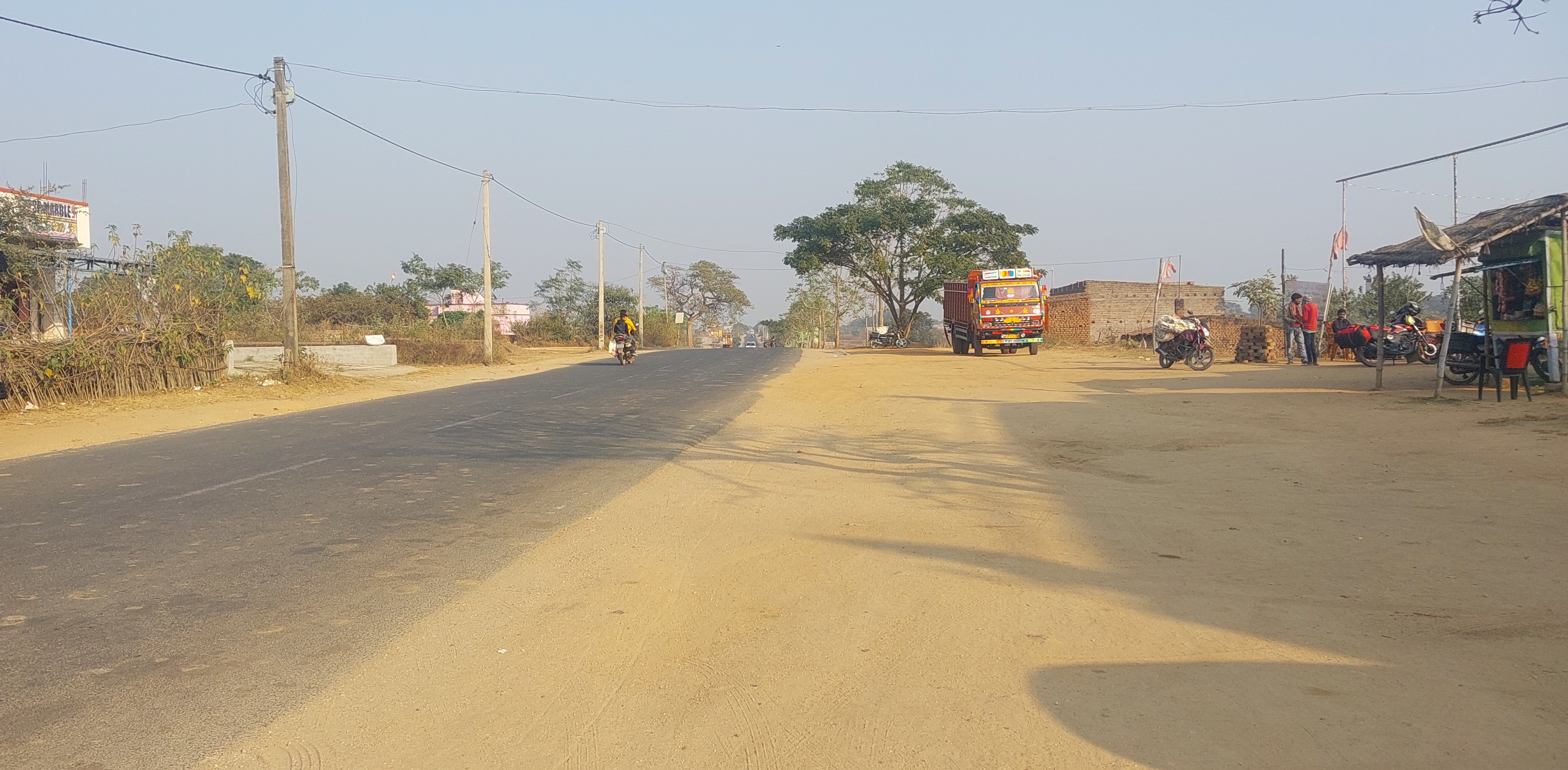
- Kotshila village

- Location in West Bengal, India Kotshila (India)
- Coordinates: 23°24′22.0″N 86°04′12.0″E
- Country: India
- State: West Bengal
- District: Purulia

Population (2011)
  - Total: 1,452

Languages
  - Official: Bengali, English
- Time zone: UTC+5:30 (IST)
- PIN: 723213 (Jiudaru)
- Telephone code: 03254
- Lok Sabha constituency: Purulia
- Vidhan Sabha constituency: Joypur
- Website: purulia.gov.in
- Places in Jhalda subdivision in Purulia district. Key: M: municipality, C: census town, R: rural/ urban centre, H: historical/ religious centre, X: craft centre, T: tourist centre, △: hills Owing to space constraints in the small map, the locations in the larger map on click through may vary slightly.

Kotshila is a village, with a police station and a railway junction station, in the Jhalda II CD block in the Jhalda subdivision of the Purulia district in the state of West Bengal, India.

== Geography ==
=== Location ===
Kotshila is located at 23°24′22.0″N 86°04′12.0″E.

=== Area overview ===
Purulia district forms the lowest step of the Chota Nagpur Plateau. The general scenario is undulating land with scattered hills. Jhalda subdivision, shown in the map alongside, is located in the western part of the district, bordering Jharkhand. The Subarnarekha flows along a short stretch of its western border. It is an overwhelmingly rural subdivision with 91.02% of the population living in rural areas and 8.98% living in urban areas. There are three census towns in the subdivision. The map alongside shows some of the tourist attractions in the Ajodhya Hills. The area is home to the Purulia Chhau dance with spectacular masks made at Charida. The remnants of old temples and deities are found in the subdivision also, as in other parts of the district.

== Demographics ==
According to the 2011 Census of India, Kotshila had a total population of 1,452 of which 753 (52%) were males and 699 (48%) were females. There were 253 persons in the age range of 0 to 6 years. The total number of literate people in Kotshila was 613 (51.38% of the population over 6 years).

== Police station ==
Kotshila police station has jurisdiction over a part of the Jhalda II CD block. The area covered is 284 km^{2} (110 sq mi) and the population covered is 148,042. It has a 25.48 km (15.83 mi) interstate border with Jaridih PS in the Bokaro district of Jharkhand.

== Transport ==
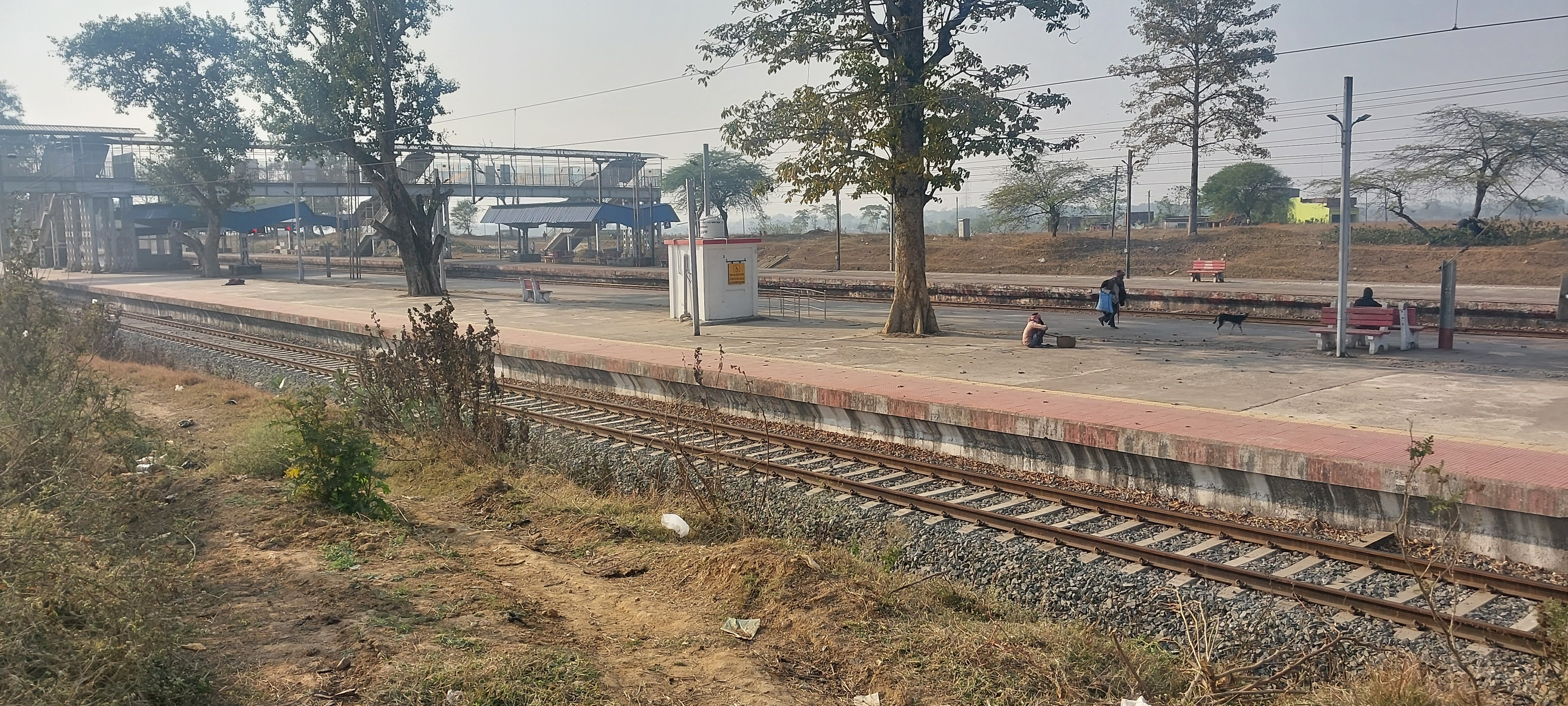
Kotshila Junction railway station

State Highway 4A running from Tulin to Chas More (both in the Purulia district) passes through Kotshila.

The NSC Bose Gomoh-Hatia line of the South Eastern Railway passes through this CD block and there are stations at Kotshila and Jhalda. The Purulia-Kotshila branch line connects to the NSC Bose Gomoh-Hatia line at Kotshila.

== Education ==
Kotshila Mahavidyalaya at Jiudaru is affiliated with Sidho Kanho Birsha University.

== Healthcare ==
Muralhar Kotshila Rural Hospital, with 30 beds, is the major government medical facility in the Jhalda II CD block.
