= Chekya =

- Census Town
- Location in West Bengal, India Chekya (India)
- Coordinates: 23.3951°N 85.9984°E
- Country: India
- State: West Bengal
- District: Purulia

Area
  - Total: 1.7151 km^{2} (0.6622 sq mi)

Population (2011)
  - Total: 5,995
  - Density: 3,495/km^{2} (9,053/sq mi)

Languages
  - Official: Bengali, English
- Time zone: UTC+5:30 (IST)
- PIN: 723202
- Telephone/STD code: 03254
- Lok Sabha constituency: Purulia
- Vidhan Sabha constituency: Joypur
- Website: purulia.gov.in
- Places in Jhalda subdivision in Purulia district. Key: M: municipality, C: census town, R: rural/ urban centre, H: historical/ religious centre, X: craft centre, T: tourist centre, △: hills Owing to space constraints in the small map, the locations in the larger map on click through may vary slightly.

Chekya is a census town and a gram panchayat in the Jhalda II CD block in the Purulia Sadar subdivision of the Purulia district in the state of West Bengal, India.

== Geography ==
=== Location ===
Chekya is located at 23.3951°N 85.9984°E.

=== Area overview ===
Purulia district forms the lowest step of the Chota Nagpur Plateau. The general scenario is undulating land with scattered hills. Jhalda subdivision, shown in the map alongside, is located in the western part of the district, bordering Jharkhand. The Subarnarekha flows along a short stretch of its western border. It is an overwhelmingly rural subdivision with 91.02% of the population living in the rural areas and 8.98% living in the urban areas. There are 3 census towns in the subdivision. The map alongside shows some of the tourist attractions in the Ajodhya Hills. The area is home to Purulia Chhau dance with spectacular masks made at Charida. The remnants of old temples and deities are found in the subdivision also, as in other parts of the district.

== Demographics ==
According to the 2011 Census of India, Chekya had a total population of 5,995, of which 3,070 (51%) were males and 2,925 (49%) were females. There were 1,125 persons in the age range of 0–6 years. The total number of literate persons in Chekya was 2,790 (57.29% of the population over 6 years).

== Infrastructure ==
According to the District Census Handbook 2011, Puruliya, Chekya covered an area of 1.7151 km^{2} (0.6622 sq mi). There is a railway station at Jhalda 7 km (4.3 mi) away. Among the civic amenities, the protected water supply involved overhead tank, uncovered well, hand pump. It had 467 domestic electric connections and four road light points. Among the medical facilities it had one dispensary/ health centre, one maternity and child welfare centre, one veterinary hospital, five medicine shops. Among the educational facilities it had were nine primary schools, one middle school, one secondary school, the nearest senior secondary school and the nearest degree college are at Jhalda. Among the social, recreational and cultural facilities it had one auditorium/ community hall. An important commodity it produced was beedi.

== Education ==
Chekya High School is a Bengali-medium coeducational institution established in 1987. It has facilities for teaching from class V to class XII.

Kotshila Mahavidyalaya was established in 2010 at Jiudaru.

== Healthcare ==
Muralhar Kotshila Rural Hospital, with 30 beds at Jiudaru, is the major government medical facility in the Jhalda II CD block.
