= Baneswar Mahato =

Indian politician

Member of the West Bengal Legislative Assembly
- In office 2 May 2021 – 4 May 2026
- Preceded by: Santiram Mahato
- Succeeded by: Jaladhar Mahato
- Constituency: Balarampur

Personal details
- Party: Bharatiya Janata Party

Baneswar Mahato is an Indian politician from Bharatiya Janata Party. In May 2021, he was elected as a member of the West Bengal Legislative Assembly from Balarampur (constituency). He defeated Shantiram Mahato of All India Trinamool Congress by 2,733 votes in 2021 West Bengal Assembly election.
