= Lagda =

- Census Town
- Location in West Bengal, India Lagda (India)
- Coordinates: 23.3698°N 86.3225°E
- Country: India
- State: West Bengal
- District: Purulia

Area
  - Total: 4.2857 km^{2} (1.6547 sq mi)

Population (2011)
  - Total: 5,694
  - Density: 1,329/km^{2} (3,441/sq mi)

Languages
  - Official: Bengali, English
- Time zone: UTC+5:30 (IST)
- PIN: 723149
- Telephone/STD code: 03251
- Lok Sabha constituency: Purulia
- Vidhan Sabha constituency: Balarampur
- Website: purulia.gov.in

Lagda is a census town and a gram panchayat in the Purulia I CD block in the Purulia Sadar subdivision of the Purulia district in the state of West Bengal, India.

== Geography ==
Places in Purulia Sadar subdivision in Purulia district
M: municipality, CT: census town, R: rural/ urban centre, H: historical/ religious centre, F: facility
Owing to space constraints in the small map, the actual locations in a larger map may vary slightly

=== Location ===
Lagda is located at 23.3698°N 86.3225°E.

=== Area overview ===
Purulia district forms the lowest step of the Chota Nagpur Plateau. The general scenario is undulating land with scattered hills. Purulia Sadar subdivision covers the central portion of the district. 83.80% of the population of the subdivision lives in rural areas. The map alongside shows some urbanization around Purulia city. 18.58% of the population, the highest among the subdivisions of the district, lives in urban areas. There are 4 census towns in the subdivision. The Kangsabati (locally called Kansai) flows through the subdivision. The subdivision has old temples, some of them belonging to the 11th century or earlier. The focus is on education - the university, the sainik school, the Ramakrishna Mission Vidyapith at Bongabari, the upcoming medical college at Hatuara, et al.

Note: The map alongside presents some of the notable locations in the subdivision. All places marked in the map are linked in the larger full screen map.

== Demographics ==
According to the 2011 Census of India, Lagda had a total population of 5,694, of which 2,985 (52%) were males and 2,705 (48%) were females. There were 696 persons in the age range of 0–6 years. The total number of literate persons in Lagda was 3,471 (69.45% of the population over 6 years).

== Infrastructure ==
According to the District Census Handbook 2011, Puruliya, Lagda covered an area of 4.2857 km^{2}. There is a railway station at Purulia 12 km away. Among the civic amenities, the protected water supply involved overhead tank and tap water from untreated sources. It had 425 domestic electric connections. Among the medical facilities it had 1 hospital, 2 dispensaries/ health centres, 1 maternity and child welfare centre. Among the educational facilities it had were 4 primary schools, 1 secondary school, 1 senior secondary school, the nearest degree college at Purulia 7 km away.

== Education ==
Lagda High School is a Bengali-medium coeducational institution established in 1937. It has facilities for teaching from class V to class XII. It has 12 computers, 5,348 books in the library and a play ground.

Lagda Girls High School is a Bengali-medium girls only institution established in 2000. It has facilities for teaching from class V to class X.

== Healthcare ==
There is a primary health centre at Lagda with 6 beds.
