= Jhalda II =

- Community development block
- Coordinates: 23°24′58″N 86°05′40″E
- Country: India
- State: West Bengal
- District: Purulia
- Parliamentary constituency: Purulia
- Assembly constituency: Joypur

Area
  - Total: 256.61 km^{2} (99.08 sq mi)
- Elevation: 297 m (974 ft)

Population (2011)
  - Total: 148,156
  - Density: 577.36/km^{2} (1,495.4/sq mi)
- Time zone: UTC+5.30 (IST)
- PIN: 723214 (Begunkodar)
- Telephone/STD code: 03254
- Vehicle registration: WB-55, WB-56
- Literacy Rate: 54.76%
- Website: http://www.jhalda2.org

Jhalda II is a community development block (CD block) that forms an administrative division in the Jhalda subdivision of the Purulia district in the Indian state of West Bengal.

== History ==
=== Background ===
The Jaina Bhagavati-Sutra of the 5th century AD mentions that Purulia was one of the sixteen mahajanapadas and was a part of the kingdom known as Vajra-bhumi in ancient times. In 1833, the Manbhum district was carved out of the Jungle Mahals district, with headquarters at Manbazar. In 1838, the headquarters was transferred to Purulia. After independence, when Manbhum district was a part of Bihar, efforts were made to impose Hindi on the Bengali-speaking majority of the district and it led to the Bengali Language Movement (Manbhum). In 1956, the Manbhum district was partitioned between Bihar and West Bengal under the States Reorganization Act and the Bihar and West Bengal (Transfer of Territories) Act 1956.

=== Red corridor ===
106 districts spanning 10 states across India, described as being part of the left wing extremism activities, constitutes the Red corridor. In West Bengal the districts of Paschim Medinipur, Bankura, Purulia and Birbhum are part of the Red corridor. However, as of July 2016, there had been no reported incidents of Maoist related activities from these districts for the previous 4 years.

The CPI (Maoist) extremism affected CD Blocks in Purulia district were: Jhalda I, Jhalda II, Arsha, Baghmundi, Balarampur, Barabazar, Manbazar II and Bandwan. Certain reports also included the Manbazar I and Joypur CD blocks and some times indicted the whole of Purulia district.

The Lalgarh movement, which started attracting attention after the failed assassination attempt on Buddhadeb Bhattacharjee, then chief minister of West Bengal, in the Salboni area of the Paschim Medinipur district, on 2 November 2008 and the police action that followed, had also spread over to these areas. The movement was not just a political struggle but an armed struggle that concurrently took the look of a social struggle. A large number of CPI (M) activists were killed. Although the epi-centre of the movement was Lalgarh, it was spread across 19 police stations in three adjoining districts – Paschim Medinipur, Bankura and Purulia, all thickly forested and near the border with Jharkhand. The deployment of the CRPF and other forces started on 11 June 2009. The movement came to an end after the 2011 state assembly elections and change of government in West Bengal. The death of Kishenji, the Maoist commander, on 24 November 2011 was the last major landmark.

== Geography ==
CD blocks in Purulia district

Kotshila is located at 23°24′58″N 86°05′40″E.

The Jhalda II CD block is located in the western part of the district. The Kangsabati River takes its name after the confluence of the Saharjor and Girgiri rivers near Tigra village in the Jhalda II CD block. Geographyically the area forms a part of the Chota Nagpur Plateau.

The Jhalda II CD block is bounded by the Jaridih CD block, in the Bokaro district of Jharkhand, on a part of the north, the Joypur CD block on parts of the north and the east, The Arsha CD block on the east, the Baghmundi CD block on the south, and Jhalda I CD block on the west.

The Jhalda II CD block has an area of 256.61 km^{2}. It has 1 panchayat samity, 9 gram panchayats, 99 gram sansads (village councils), 131 mouzas, 118 inhabited villages and 2 census towns. Kotshila and Jhalda (partly) police stations serve this block. Headquarters of this CD block is at Kotshila.

Gram panchayats of the Jhalda II CD block/panchayat samiti are: Bamina-Belyadih, Begunkodor, Chekya, Chitmu, Hirapur-Adardih, Majhidih, Nowahatu, Rigid and Tatuara.

== Demographics ==
=== Population ===
According to the 2011 Census of India, the Jhalda II CD block had a total population of 148,156, of which 135,814 were rural and 12,342 were urban. There were 75,453 (51%) males and 72,703 (49%) females. There were 24,831 persons in the age range of 0 to 6 years. The Scheduled Castes numbered 15,663 (10.57%) and the Scheduled Tribes numbered 15,917 (10.74%).

According to the 2001 census, the Jhalda II block had a total population of 123,696, out of which 63,279 were males and 60,417 were females. The Jhalda II block registered a population growth of 18.15 per cent during the 1991-2001 decade. Decadal growth for the Purulia district was 13.96 per cent. Decadal growth in West Bengal was 17.84 per cent.

Census towns in the Jhalda II CD block are (2011 census figures in brackets): Chekya (5,995) and Begunkodor (6,347).

Large villages (with 4,000+ population) in the Jhalda II CD block are (2011 census figures in brackets): Belyadi (4,217), Bararola (5,913) and Tatayara (5,863).

Other villages in the Jhalda II CD block are (2011 census figures in brackets): Chitmu (3,893), Adardi (1,980), Bamaniya (2,785), Kotshila (1,452), Hirapur (739), Nawahatu (1,625), Oldih (1797) and Rigid (2,312).

=== Literacy ===
According to the 2011 census the total number of literates in the Jhalda II CD block was 67,532 (54.76% of the population over 6 years) out of which males numbered 45,588 (72.53% of the male population over 6 years) and females numbered 21,944 (36.29%) of the female population over 6 years). The gender disparity (the difference between female and male literacy rates) was 36.24%.

See also – List of West Bengal districts ranked by literacy rate

Literacy in CD blocks of
Purulia district
Purulia Sadar subdivision
Arsha – 57.48%
Balarampur – 60.40%
Hura – 68.79%
Purulia I – 78.37%
Purulia II – 63.39%
Manbazar subdivision
Barabazar – 63.27
Bandwan – 61.38%
Manbazar I – 63.78%
Manbazar II – 60.27%
Puncha – 68.14%
Jhalda subdivision
Baghmundi – 57.17%
Jhalda I – 66.18%
Jhalda II – 54.76%
Joypur – 57.94%
Raghunathpur subdivision
Para – 65.62%
Raghunathpur I – 67.36%
Raghunathpur II – 67.29%
Neturia – 65.14%
Santuri – 64.15%
Kashipur – 71.06%
2011 Census: CD Block Wise

Primary Census Abstract Data

=== Language and religion ===
Religion in Jhalda II CD block (2011)
Hinduism	87.19%
Other (tribal religion)	8.00%
Islam	4.43%
Other or not stated	0.38%

In the 2011 census, Hindus numbered 129,187 and formed 87.19% of the population in the Jhalda II CD block. Muslims numbered 6,559 and formed 4.43% of the population. Others numbered 12,410 and formed 8.38% of the population. Others include Addi Bassi, Marang Boro, Santal, Saranath, Sari Dharma, Sarna, Alchchi, Bidin, Sant, Saevdharm, Seran, Saran, Sarin, Kheria, and other religious communities. In 2001, Hindus were 86.02%, Muslims 4.29% and tribal religions 9.55% of the population respectively.

Languages of Jhalda II CD block (2011)
1. Bengali (79.2%)
2. Kurmali (12.5%)
3. Santali (6.89%)
4. Others (1.41%)

At the time of the 2011 census, 79.16% of the population spoke Bengali, 12.54% Kurmali and 6.89% Santali as their first language.

== Rural Poverty ==
According to the Rural Household Survey in 2005, 32.85% of total number of families were BPL families in Purulia district. According to a World Bank report, as of 2012, 31-38% of the population in Purulia, Murshidabad and Uttar Dinajpur districts were below poverty level, the highest among the districts of West Bengal, which had an average 20% of the population below poverty line.

== Economy ==
=== Livelihood ===
Livelihood
in Jhalda II CD block
1. Cultivators (15.8%)
2. Agricultural labourers (15.1%)
3. Household industries (48.1%)
4. Other Workers (20.9%)

In the Jhalda II CD block in 2011, among the class of total workers, cultivators numbered 10,637 and formed 15.83%, agricultural labourers numbered 10,126 and formed 15.07%, household industry workers numbered 32,347 and formed 48.15% and other workers numbered 14,068 and formed 20.94%. Total workers numbered 67,178 and formed 45.34% of the total population, and non-workers numbered 80,978 and formed 54.66% of the population.

Note: In the census records a person is considered a cultivator, if the person is engaged in cultivation/ supervision of land owned by self/government/institution. When a person who works on another person's land for wages in cash or kind or share, is regarded as an agricultural labourer. Household industry is defined as an industry conducted by one or more members of the family within the household or village, and one that does not qualify for registration as a factory under the Factories Act. Other workers are persons engaged in some economic activity other than cultivators, agricultural labourers and household workers. It includes factory, mining, plantation, transport and office workers, those engaged in business and commerce, teachers, entertainment artistes and so on.

=== Infrastructure ===
There are 118 inhabited villages in the Jhalda II CD block, as per the District Census Handbook, Puruliya, 2011. 100% villages have power supply. 100% villages have drinking water supply. 23 villages (19.49%) have post offices. 96 villages (81.36%) have telephones (including landlines, public call offices and mobile phones). 33 villages (27.97%) have pucca (paved) approach roads and 25 villages (25.19%) have transport communication (includes bus service, rail facility and navigable waterways). 6 villages (5.08%) have agricultural credit societies and 6 villages (5.08%) have banks.

=== Agriculture ===
In 2013–14, persons engaged in agriculture in the Jhalda II CD block could be classified as follows: bargadars 0.44%, patta (document) holders 14.55%, small farmers (possessing land between 1 and 2 hectares) 6.12%, marginal farmers (possessing land up to 1 hectare) 38.42% and agricultural labourers 40.47%.

In 2013–14, the total area irrigated in the Jhalda II CD block was 11,856.90 hectares, out of which 3,832.00 hectares was by canal irrigation, 7,228.65 hectares by tank water, 42.21 hectares by river lift irrigation, 201.80 hectares by open dug wells and 552.20 hectares by other means.

In 2013–14, the Jhalda II CD block produced 85,194 tonnes of Aman paddy, the main winter crop, from 34,155 hectares, 511 tonnes of wheat from 216 hectares, 158 tonnes of maize from 73 hectares and 1,149 tonnes of potato from 42 hectares. It also produced maskalai, khesari, gram and mustard.

=== Banking ===
In 2013–14, the Jhalda II CD block had offices of 4 commercial banks and 1 gramin bank.

=== Backward Regions Grant Fund ===
The Purulia district is listed as a backward region and receives financial support from the Backward Regions Grant Fund. The fund, created by the Government of India, is designed to redress regional imbalances in development. As of 2012, 272 districts across the country were listed under this scheme. The list includes 11 districts of West Bengal.

== Transport ==
In 2013–14, the Jhalda II CD block had 5 originating/ terminating bus routes.

The NSC Bose Gomoh-Hatia line of the South Eastern Railway passes through this CD block and there are stations at Kotshila and Jhalda. The Purulia-Kotshila branch line connects to the NSC Bose Gomoh-Hatia line at Kotshila.

State Highway 4 originates from Jhalda at its junction with the State Highway 4A running from Tulin to Chas Morh (both in the Purulia district).

== Education ==
In 2013–14, the Jhalda II CD block had 116 primary schools with 15,188 students, 11 middle schools with 453 students and 11 higher secondary schools with 14,085 students. The Jhalda II CD Block had 1 general college with 213 students and 215 institutions with 10,696 students for special and non-formal education.

See also – Education in India

According to the 2011 census, in Jhalda II CD block, amongst the 118 inhabited villages, 9 villages did not have a school, 23 villages had two or more primary schools, 24 villages had at least 1 primary and 1 middle school and 13 villages had at least 1 middle and 1 secondary school.

Kotshila Mahavidyalaya was established in 2010 at Jiudaru.

== Healthcare ==
In 2014, the Jhalda II CD block had 1 rural hospital and 2 primary health centres, with total 44 beds and 7 doctors. 7,072 patients were treated indoor and 238,003 patients were treated outdoor in the hospitals, health centres and subcentres of the CD Block.

Muralhar Kotshila Rural Hospital, with 30 beds at Jiudaru, is the major government medical facility in the Jhalda II CD block. There are primary health centres at Begunkodor (with 10 beds) and Khatanga (with 4 beds).
