= Suisa =

- Village
- Location in West Bengal, India Suisa (India)
- Coordinates: 23.1956°N 85.8938°E
- Country: India
- State: West Bengal
- District: Purulia

Population (2011)
  - Total: 2,649

Languages
  - Official: Bengali
- Time zone: UTC+5:30 (IST)
- PIN: 723212
- Telephone/STD code: 03254
- Lok Sabha constituency: Purulia
- Vidhan Sabha constituency: Baghmundi
- Website: purulia.gov.in
- Places in Jhalda subdivision in Purulia district. Key: M: municipality, C: census town, R: rural/ urban centre, H: historical/ religious centre, X: craft centre, T: tourist centre, △: hills Owing to space constraints in the small map, the locations in the larger map on click through may vary slightly.

Suisa is a village in the Tunturi-Suisa panchayat in the Baghmundi CD block in the Jhalda subdivision of the Purulia district in the state of West Bengal, India.

== Demographics ==
According to the 2011 Census of India, Suisa had a total population of 2,649, of which 1,339 (51%) were males and 1,310 (49%) were females. There were 1,310 persons in the age range of 0–6 years. The total number of literate persons in Suisa was 1,541 (67.92% of the population over 6 years).

== Geography ==
=== Location ===
Suisa is located at 23.1956°N 85.8938°E.

Suisa is situated at a distance of about 50 km from the district headquarters at Purulia.

=== Area overview ===
Purulia district forms the lowest step of the Chota Nagpur Plateau. The general scenario is undulating land with scattered hills. Jhalda subdivision, shown in the map alongside, is located in the western part of the district, bordering Jharkhand. The Subarnarekha flows along a short stretch of its western border. It is an overwhelmingly rural subdivision with 91.02% of the population living in the rural areas and 8.98% living in the urban areas. There are 3 census towns in the subdivision. The map alongside shows some of the tourist attractions in the Ajodhya Hills. The area is home to Purulia Chhau dance with spectacular masks made at Charida. The remnants of old temples and deities are found in the subdivision also, as in other parts of the district.

== Education ==
=== College ===
- Netaji Subhash Ashram Mahavidyalaya

=== School ===
- Suisa High School

== Jain influence in the Suisa-Deuli region ==
Jainism flourished in the western parts of West Bengal during the 10th-13th century. Many temples were built during this period. Purulia district had a large concentration of Jain temples. Apart from three dilapidated temples at Deuli, many statues of Jain tirthankaras and other Jainism-related articles have been found in the area. With some official initiative, these items have been shifted to a local one-roomed museum at Suisa. When the archaeologist J.D.Beglar explored the area in the 1870s, there were many temples.

Among the iconic images that can be seen are large Vishnu sculpture in the unusual tri-bhanga pose, Ambika (broken), a chaturmukha shrine of Rekha type with a seated tirthankara and images of different tirthankaras, and several related images.

== Transport ==
There is a station at Suisa on the Chandil-Muri line.

== Suisa picture gallery ==
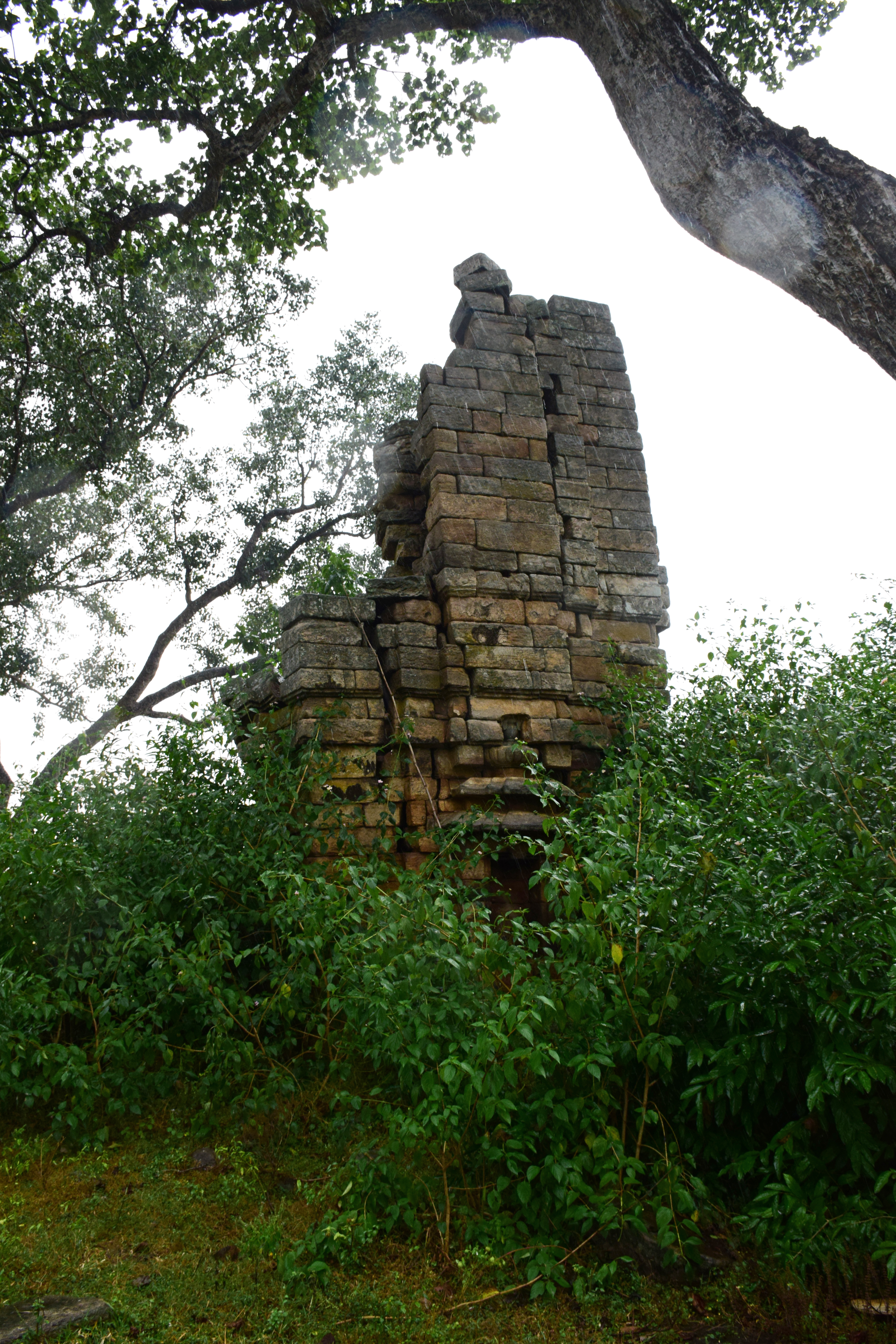
A ruined deul near Suissa

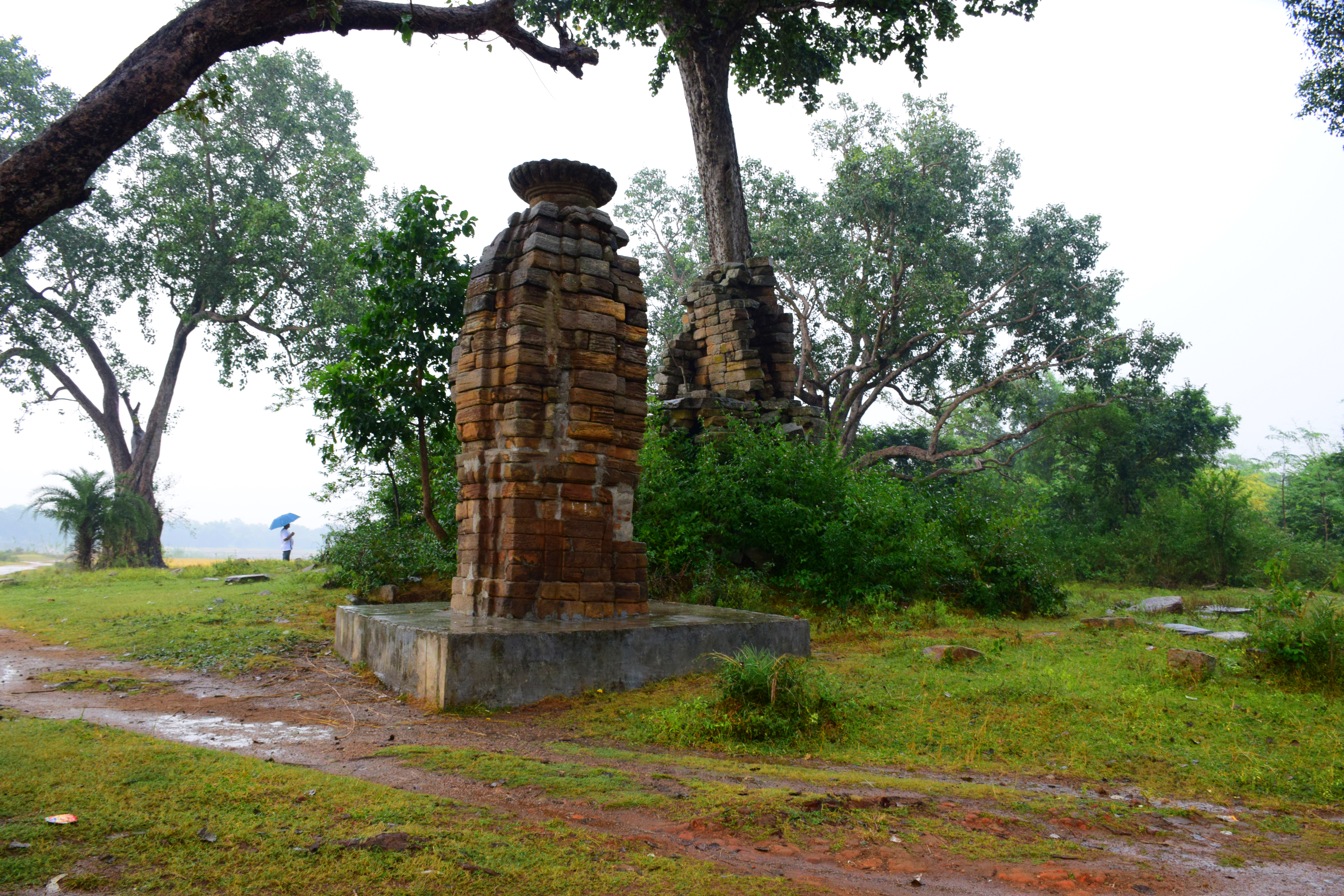
A small deul at Deuli near Suissa

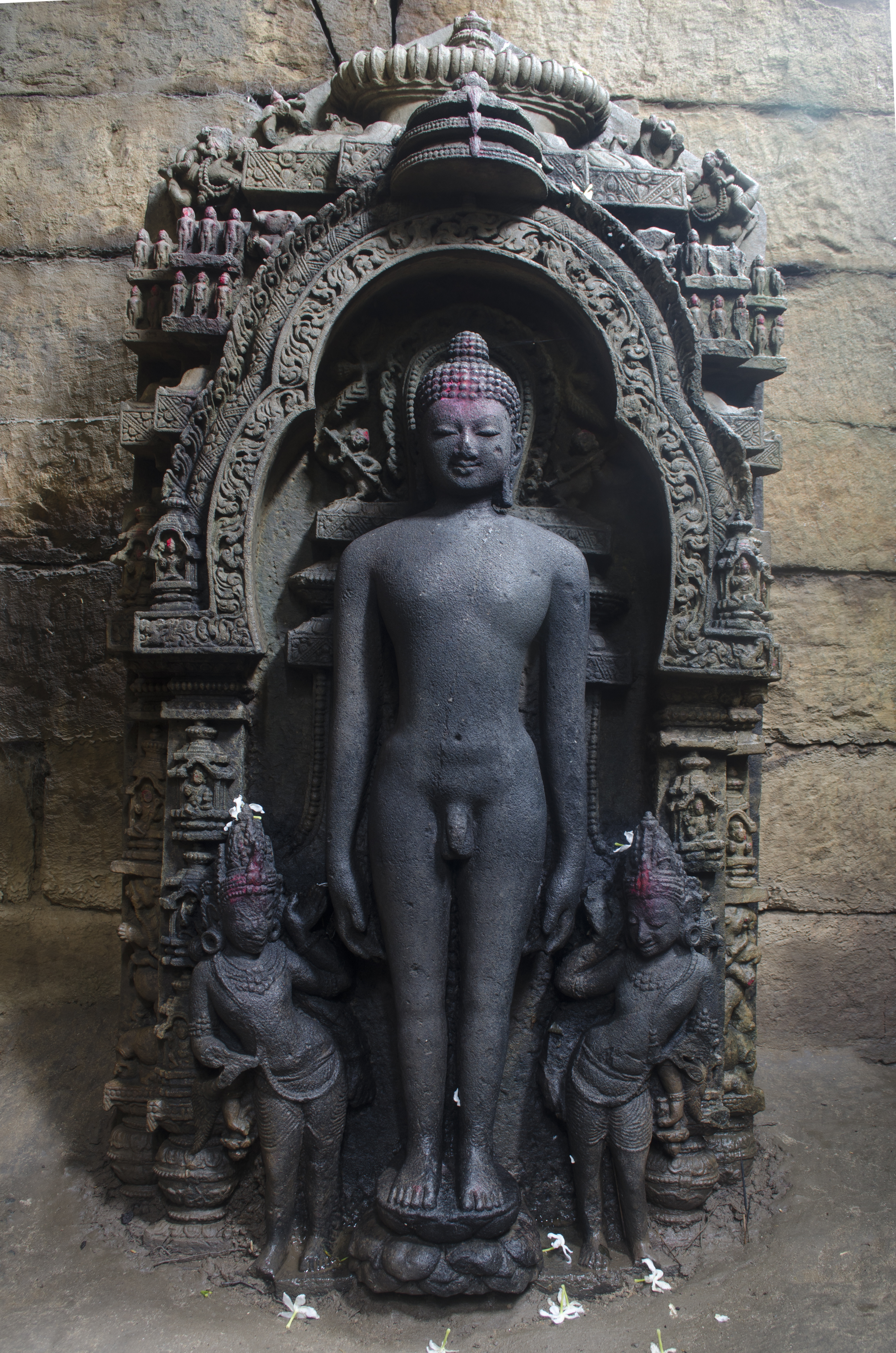
Tirthankar statue inside Deuli temple
