= Chittaranjan Mahata =

Indian politician

Member of Parliament
- In office 1977–1991
- Preceded by: Debendranath Mahata
- Succeeded by: Bir Singh Mahato
- Constituency: Purulia

Personal details
- Born: 1 May 1937 Hetjargo, Purulia, Bengal Presidency, British India
- Party: All India Forward Bloc

Chittaranjan Mahata also known as Chitta Mahato was an Indian politician. He was elected to the Lok Sabha, the lower house of the Parliament of India from the Purulia in West Bengal as a member of the All India Forward Bloc.
