= Nepal Mahata =

Indian politician (born 1961)

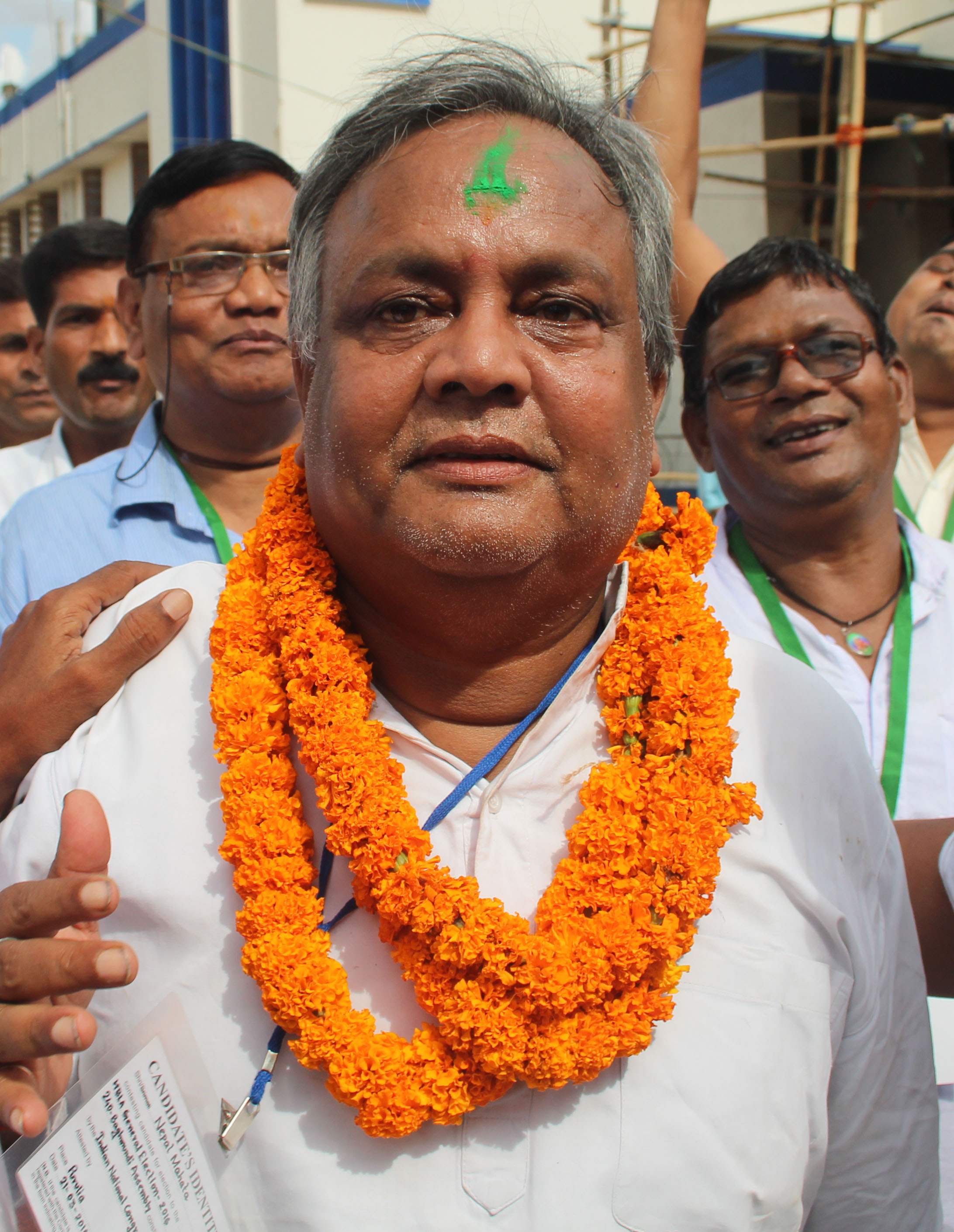

Deputy Leader of the Opposition in West Bengal
- In office 2 June 2016 – 3 May 2021
- Governor: Jagdeep Dhankhar; Keshari Nath Tripathi
- Chief Minister: Mamata Banerjee
- Preceded by: Subhas Naskar
- Succeeded by: Mihir Goswami

Member of West Bengal Legislative Assembly
- In office 13 May 2011 – 2 May 2021
- Preceded by: Constituency did not exist
- Succeeded by: Sushanta Mahato
- Constituency: Baghmundi
- In office 13 May 2001 – 13 May 2011
- Preceded by: Satyaranjan Mahato
- Succeeded by: Constituency abolished
- Constituency: Jhalda

Personal details
- Born: 26 October 1961 (age 64) Purulia, West Bengal
- Party: Indian National Congress
- Spouse: Rita Mahato
- Children: Debmohan Mahata
- Education: Burdhman university
- Profession: Teacher, headmaster

Nepal Mahata (born 26 October 1961) is an Indian politician belonging to Indian National Congress who was a Member of West Bengal State Legislative Assembly representing Baghmundi constituency from 2011 till 2021. He is also currently serving as the Working president in the West Bengal state congress Committee. By profession he is a teacher and is currently serving as a secretary in Ichag High School.

== Personal life and education ==
Nepal Mahato was born in Purulia district of West Bengal to Debendra Nath Mahata and Bhabarani Mahata. He is married to Rita Mahata and has a son Debmohan Mahata, is currently pursuing M.B.B.S at ICARE Institute Of Medical Sciences And Research And Dr.Bidhan Chandra Roy Hospital, Haldia (2022-2023 Batch).

Mahato did his schooling from Jhalda Satyabhama Vidyapith. He then joined JK college and University of Burdwan, where he completed his bachelor's and master's degree in Applied mathematics, before taking admission in Chotonagpur Law College (under University of Ranchi) to pursue LLB. He further went on to obtain a BEd in Mathematics from Ignou, making his dream of becoming a teacher come true.

== Electoral performances ==
Mahato first got elected from Jhalda constituency in 2001 and then again in 2006, 2011 and 2016 (last two after the renaming of his constituency post delimitation in 2009). He was also the candidate of his party for Purulia Lok sabha seat in 2014 and 2019.

Year	Election	Party	Constituency Name	Result	Votes gained	Vote share%
2001	2001 West Bengal Legislative Assembly election	Indian National Congress	Jhalda	Won	48568	49.19%
2006	2006 West Bengal Legislative Assembly election	Indian National Congress	Jhalda	Won	59594	51.47%
2011	2011 West Bengal Legislative Assembly election	Indian National Congress	Baghmundi	Won	77,458	49.48%
2014	16th Lok Sabha	Indian National Congress	Purulia	Lost	4,13,394	21.41%
2016	2016 West Bengal Legislative Assembly election	Indian National Congress	Baghmundi	Won	88707	47.16%
2021	2021 West Bengal Legislative Assembly election	Indian National Congress	Baghmundi	Lost	51,046	24.74%

State Legislative Assembly
Preceded by ?	Member of the West Bengal Legislative Assembly from Jhalda Assembly constituency 2001–2011	Seat abolished
New seat	Member of the West Bengal Legislative Assembly from Baghmundi Assembly constituency 2011–	Incumbent
