= Baghmundi (community development block) =

- Community development block
- Coordinates: 23°12′00″N 86°03′00″E
- Country: India
- State: West Bengal
- District: Purulia
- Parliamentary constituency: Purulia
- Assembly constituency: Baghmundi

Area
  - Total: 427.95 km^{2} (165.23 sq mi)
- Elevation: 700 m (2,300 ft)

Population (2011)
  - Total: 135,579
  - Density: 316.81/km^{2} (820.54/sq mi)

Languages
  - Official: Bengali, English
  - Additional Official: Santali
- Time zone: UTC+5.30 (IST)
- PIN: 723152 (Baghmundi)
- Telephone/STD code: 03254
- Vehicle registration: WB-55, WB-56
- Literacy Rate: 57.17%

Baghmundi is a community development block (CD block) that forms an administrative division in the Jhalda subdivision of the Purulia district in the Indian state of West Bengal.

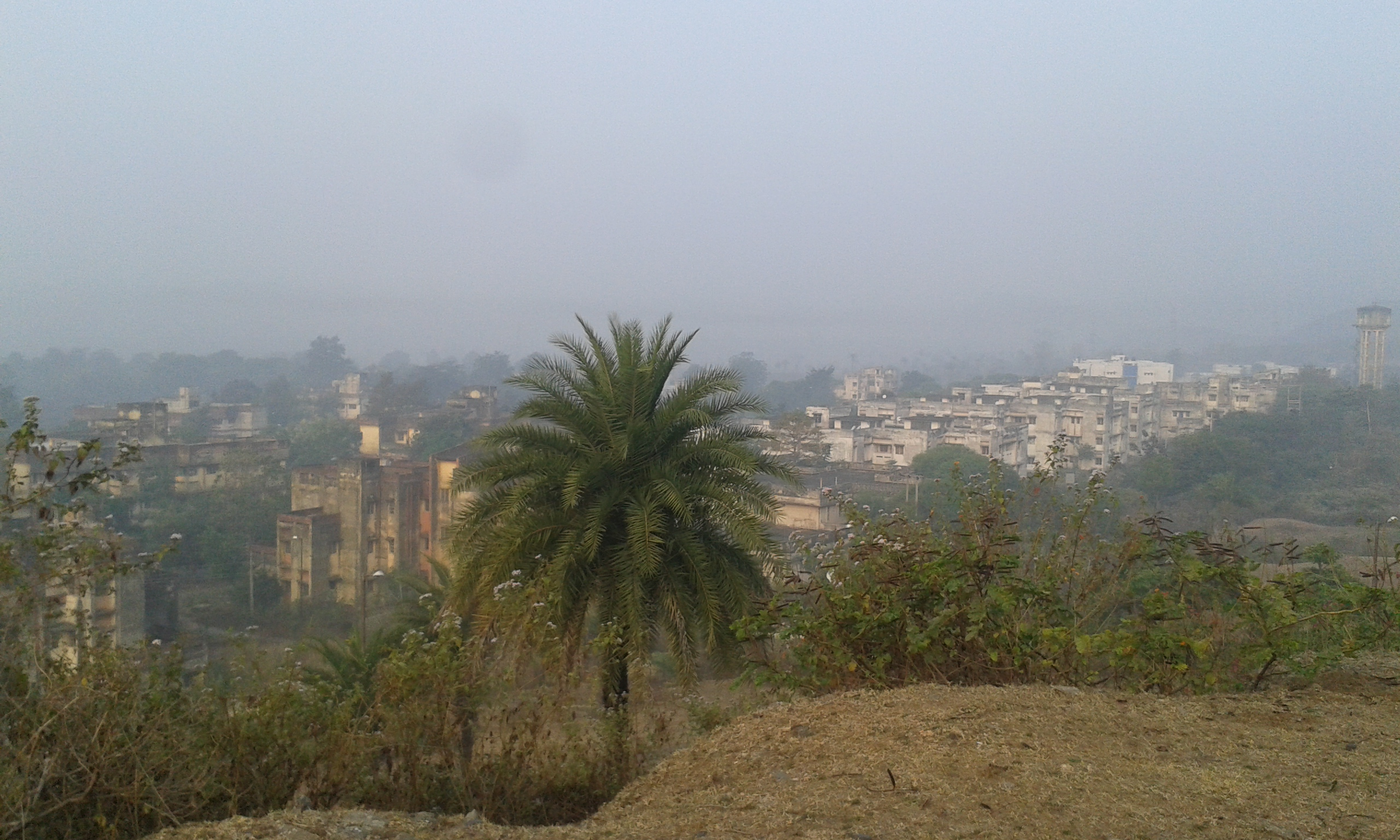
Baghmundi town

== History ==
=== Background ===
Jaina Bhagavati-Sutra of the 5th century AD mentions that Purulia was one of the sixteen mahajanapadas and was a part of the kingdom known as Vajra-bhumi in ancient times. In 1833, the Manbhum district was carved out of the Jungle Mahals district, with headquarters at Manbazar. In 1838, the headquarters was transferred to Purulia. After independence, when Manbhum district was a part of Bihar, efforts were made to impose Hindi on the Bengali-speaking majority of the district and it led to the Bengali Language Movement (Manbhum). In 1956, the Manbhum district was partitioned between Bihar and West Bengal under the States Reorganization Act and the Bihar and West Bengal (Transfer of Territories) Act 1956.

=== Red corridor ===
106 districts spanning 10 states across India, described as being part of the left wing extremism activities, constitutes the Red corridor. In West Bengal the districts of Paschim Medinipur, Bankura, Purulia and Birbhum are part of the Red corridor. However, as of July 2016, there had been no reported incidents of Maoist related activities from these districts for the previous 4 years.

The CPI (Maoist) extremism affected CD blocks in the Purulia district were: Jhalda I, Jhalda II, Arsha, Baghmundi, Balarampur, Barabazar, Manbazar II and Bandwan. Certain reports also included the Manbazar I and Joypur CD blocks and some times indicted the whole of Purulia district.

The Lalgarh movement, which started attracting attention after the failed assassination attempt on Buddhadeb Bhattacharjee, then chief minister of West Bengal, in the Salboni area of the Paschim Medinipur district, on 2 November 2008 and the police action that followed, had also spread over to these areas. The movement was not just a political struggle but an armed struggle that concurrently took the look of a social struggle. A large number of CPI (M) activists were killed. Although the epi-centre of the movement was Lalgarh, it was spread across 19 police stations in three adjoining districts – Paschim Medinipur, Bankura and Purulia, all thickly forested and near the border with Jharkhand. The deployment of the Central Reserve Police Force and other forces started on 11 June 2009. The movement came to an end after the 2011 state assembly elections and change of government in West Bengal. The death of Kishenji, the Maoist commander, on 24 November 2011, was the last major landmark.

== Geography ==
CD blocks in Purulia district

Baghmundi is located at 23°12′N 86°03′E.

The Baghmundi CD block is located in the southern part of the district. The Subarnarekha forms the interstate boundary between West Bengal and Jharkhand in the Jhalda I CD block and a small portion of Bahgmundi CD block. The Bagmundi-Bandwan uplands is an area that has descended from the Ranchi Plateau. In the Baghmundi and Balarampur areas, the Ajodhya Hills form the main highlands, forming the drainage divide between the basins of the Subrnarekha and the Kangsabati. The elevation ranges from 475 to 700 m.

Thousands of tourists come to visit Baghmundi to visit the Ajodhya Hills and Bagmundi dams like Murguma.

Baghmundi CD block is bounded by the Jhalda I, Jhalda II and Arsha CD blocks on the north, the Balarampur CD block on the east, the Kukru CD block, in the Seraikela Kharsawan district of Jharkhand, on the south, and the Jhalda I CD block on the west.

The Baghmundi CD block has an area of 427.95 km^{2}. It has 1 panchayat samity, 8 gram panchayats, 92 gram sansads (village councils), 142 mouzas and 138 inhabited villages. Baghmundi police station serves this block. Headquarters of this CD block is at Patardi.

Gram panchayats of the Baghmundi CD block/panchayat samiti are: Ajodhya, Baghmundi, Birgram, Burda-Kalimati, Matha, Serengdih, Sindri and Tunturi-Suisa.

== Demographics ==
=== Population ===
According to the 2011 Census of India, the Baghmundi CD block had a total population of 135,579, all of which were rural. There were 69,520 (51%) males and 66,059 (49%) females. There were 21,992 persons in the age range of 0 to 6 years. The Scheduled Castes numbered 14,042 (10.36%) and the Scheduled Tribes numbered 34,038 (25.11%).

According to the 2001 census, the Baghmundi CD block had a total population of 112,388, out of which 57,650 were males and 54,738 were females. The Baghmundi block registered a population growth of 13.64 per cent during the 1991-2001 decade. Decadal growth for the Purulia district was 13.96 per cent. Decadal growth in West Bengal was 17.84 per cent.

Large villages (with 4,000+ population) in the Baghmundi CD block are (2011 census figures in brackets): Baghmundi (4,039), Burda (5,159) and Sindri (4,138).

Other villages in the Baghmundi CD block are (2011 census figures in brackets): Ajodhya (1,468), Patardi (1,609), Birgram (3,722), Kalimati (1,961), Serengdi (305), Tunturi (2,037), Suisa (2,649) and Matha (624).

=== Literacy ===
According to the 2011 census, the total number of literate persons in the Baghmundi CD block was 64,939 (57.17% of the population over 6 years) out of which males numbered 42,019 (72.14% of the male population over 6 years) and females numbered 22,920 (41.42%) of the female population over 6 years). The gender disparity (the difference between female and male literacy rates) was 30.72%.

See also – List of West Bengal districts ranked by literacy rate

Literacy in CD blocks of
Purulia district
Purulia Sadar subdivision
Arsha – 57.48%
Balarampur – 60.40%
Hura – 68.79%
Purulia I – 78.37%
Purulia II – 63.39%
Manbazar subdivision
Barabazar – 63.27
Bandwan – 61.38%
Manbazar I – 63.78%
Manbazar II – 60.27%
Puncha – 68.14%
Jhalda subdivision
Baghmundi – 57.17%
Jhalda I – 66.18%
Jhalda II – 54.76%
Joypur – 57.94%
Raghunathpur subdivision
Para – 65.62%
Raghunathpur I – 67.36%
Raghunathpur II – 67.29%
Neturia – 65.14%
Santuri – 64.15%
Kashipur – 71.06%
2011 Census: CD Block Wise

Primary Census Abstract Data

=== Language and religion ===
Religion in Baghmundi CD block (2011)
Hinduism	85.29%
Other (tribal religion)	11.07%
Islam	2.86%
Christianity	0.56%
Other or not stated	0.22%

In the 2011 census, Hindus numbered 115,630 and formed 85.29% of the population in the Baghmundi CD block. Muslims numbered 3,882 and formed 2.86% of the population. Christians numbered 766 and formed 0.56% of the population. Others numbered 15,301 and formed 11.29% of the population. Others include Addi Bassi, Marang Boro, Santal, Saranath, Sari Dharma, Sarna, Alchchi, Bidin, Sant, Saevdharm, Seran, Saran, Sarin, Kheria, and other religious communities. In 2001, Hindus were 92.56%, Muslims 2.95%, Christians 0.43% and tribal religions 4.02% of the population respectively.

Languages of Baghmundi CD block (2011)
1. Bengali (86.1%)
2. Santali (9.95%)
3. Kurmali (2.90%)
4. Others (1.09%)

At the time of the 2011 census, 86.06% of the population spoke Bengali, 9.95% Santali and 2.90% Kurmali as their first language.

== Rural Poverty ==
According to the Rural Household Survey in 2005, 32.85% of total number of families were BPL families in Purulia district. According to a World Bank report, as of 2012, 31-38% of the population in Purulia, Murshidabad and Uttar Dinajpur districts were below poverty level, the highest among the districts of West Bengal, which had an average 20% of the population below poverty line.

== Economy ==
=== Livelihood ===
Livelihood
in Baghmundi CD block
1. Cultivators (27.4%)
2. Agricultural labourers (47.9%)
3. Household industries (2.12%)
4. Other Workers (22.5%)

In the Baghmundi CD block in 2011, among the class of total workers, cultivators numbered 17,359 and formed 27.45%, agricultural labourers numbered 30,308 and formed 47.93%, household industry workers numbered 1,340 and formed 2.12% and other workers numbered 14,228 and formed 22.50%. Total workers numbered 63,235 and formed 46.64% of the total population, and non-workers numbered 72,344 and formed 53.36% of the population.

Note: In the census records a person is considered a cultivator, if the person is engaged in cultivation/ supervision of land owned by self/government/institution. When a person who works on another person's land for wages in cash or kind or share, is regarded as an agricultural labourer. Household industry is defined as an industry conducted by one or more members of the family within the household or village, and one that does not qualify for registration as a factory under the Factories Act. Other workers are persons engaged in some economic activity other than cultivators, agricultural labourers and household workers. It includes factory, mining, plantation, transport and office workers, those engaged in business and commerce, teachers, entertainment artistes and so on.

=== Infrastructure ===
There are 138 inhabited villages in the Baghmundi CD block, as per the District Census Handbook, Puruliya, 2011, 136 villages (98.55%) have power supply. 135 villages (97.83%) have drinking water supply. 34 villages (24.64%) have post offices. 95 villages (68.84%) have telephones (including landlines, public call offices and mobile phones). 34 villages (24.64%) have pucca (paved) approach roads and 50 villages (36.23%) have transport communication (includes bus service, rail facility and navigable waterways). 4 villages (2.90%) have agricultural credit societies and 4 villages (2.90%) have banks.

=== Purulia Pumped Storage Project ===
Purulia Pumped Storage Project with an installed capacity of 900 MW (4 X 225 MW) is being set up in the Ajodhya hills under Bagmundi police station with the loan assistance of Japan Bank for International Cooperation.

=== Agriculture ===
In 2013-14, persons engaged in agriculture in the Baghmundi CD block could be classified as follows: bargadars 0.17%, patta (document) holders 10.24%, small farmers (possessing land between 1 and 2 hectares) 3.40%, marginal farmers (possessing land up to 1 hectare) 38.42% and agricultural labourers 61.05%.

In 2013-14, the total area irrigated in the Baghmundi CD block was 7,791.67 hectares, out of which 5,627.00 hectares was by canal irrigation, 1,366.75 hectares by tank water, 47.92 hectares by river lift irrigation, 103.80 hectares by open dug wells and 646.20 hectares by other means.

In 2013-14, the Baghmundi CD block produced 88,370 tonnes of Aman paddy, the main winter crop, from 35,241 hectares, 170 tonnes of wheat from 72 hectares and 583 tonnes of maize from 268 hectares. It also produced maskalai, khesari and mustard.

=== Banking ===
In 2013-14, the Baghmundi CD block had offices of 4 commercial banks and 1 gramin bank.

=== Backward Regions Grant Fund ===
The Purulia district is listed as a backward region and receives financial support from the Backward Regions Grant Fund. The fund, created by the Government of India, is designed to redress regional imbalances in development. As of 2012, 272 districts across the country were listed under this scheme. The list includes 11 districts of West Bengal.

== Transport ==
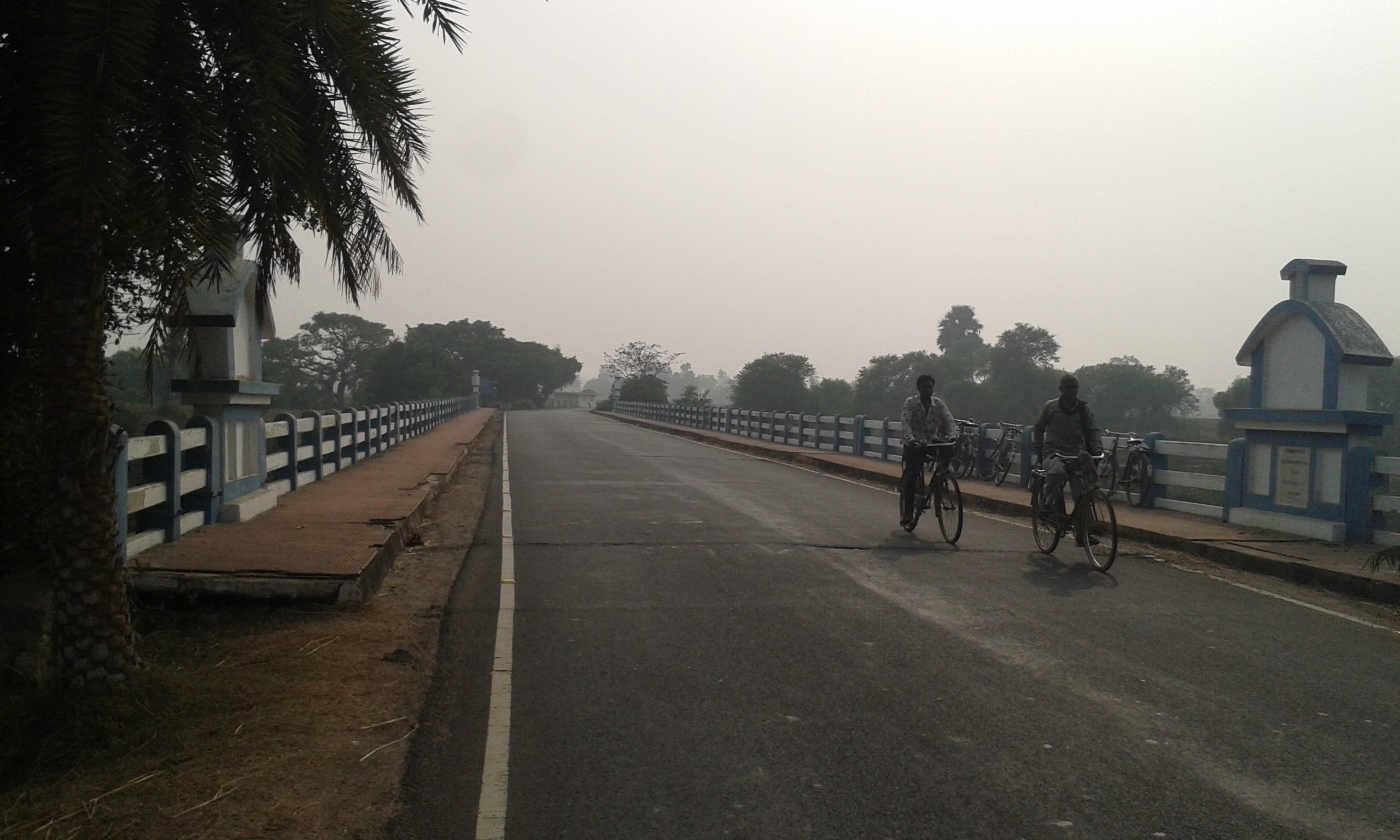
Manbazar to Baghmundi State highway, Purulia

In 2013-14, the Baghmundi CD block had 3 originating/ terminating bus routes. The nearest railway station, Barabhum railway station at Balarampur town, was 20 km from the CD block headquarters.

State Highway 4 running from Jhalda (in the Purulia district) to Junput (in the Purba Medinipur district) passes through this CD block.

== Education ==
In 2013-14, the Baghmundi CD block had 139 primary schools with 12,774 students, 25 middle schools with 873 students, 1 high school with 854 students and 11 higher secondary schools with 11,273 students. Baghmundi CD Block had 1 general college with 862 students, 1 professional/ technical institution with 50 students and 193 institutions with 7,262 students for special and non-formal education.

See also – Education in India

According to the 2011 census, in Baghmundi CD block, amongst the 138 inhabited villages, 16 villages did not have a school, 40 villages had two or more primary schools, 35 villages had at least 1 primary and 1 middle school and 13 villages had at least 1 middle and 1 secondary school.

Netaji Subhas Ashram Mahavidyalaya was established in 1985 at Suisa.

== Culture ==
=== Chhau dance mask ===
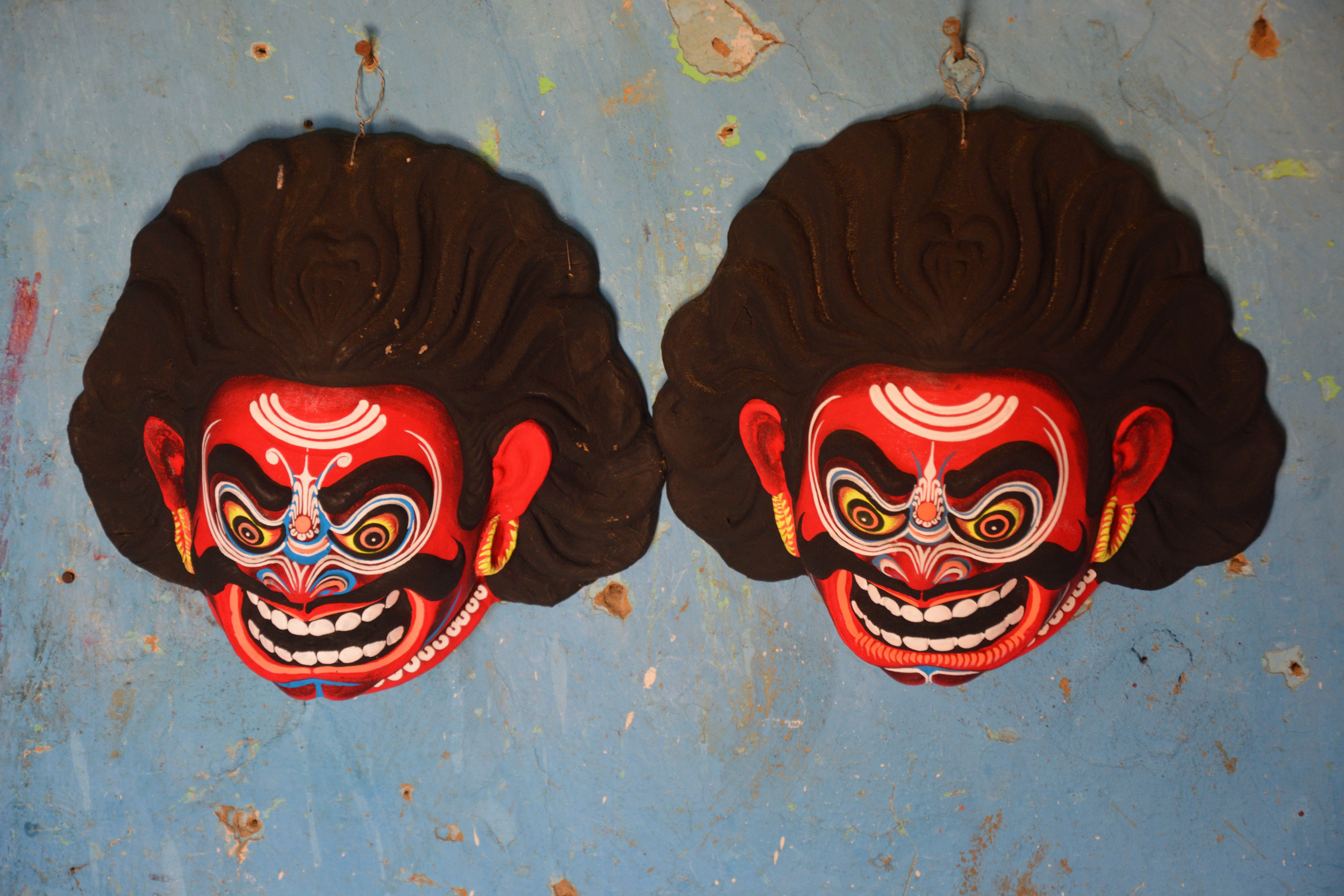
The mask prepared at Charida village in Bagmundi in Purulia district.

Chhau dance is popular in the area. All the characters in the dance are required to wear masks and as such cannot express the moods with facial expressions. Such moods are expressed with body and head (with the mask) movements. While mask movements show anger, shoulder and chest movements portray joy, melancholy, courage etc. The masks used in Chhau dance are made in Charida village in the Baghmundi area by sutradharas (artisans), who have been engaged in such work for generations. The artisans, who are familiar with the details of the Indian epics, that form the base of Chhau dance themes, produce masks that bear testimony to their artistic skills.

=== Radha Govinda temple ===
There is a Radha Govinda temple within Baghmundi Rajbari, dating back to 1733. It is an atchala (eight-eaves) temple with floral and geometrical terracotta designs but no figures. The rasmancha (stage) of a comparatively new temple has terracotta figures - enthroned Rama and Sita with entourage, Krishna in rasmandala with the gopis, episodes like the holding up of Giri Gobardhan, or the killing of Bakasur, and many secular figures and animals-all crudely modelled.

== Healthcare ==
In 2014, the Baghmundi CD block had 1 block primary health centre and 3 primary health centres, with total 62 beds and 7 doctors. 7,756 patients were treated indoor and 161,919 patients were treated outdoor in the health centres and subcentres of the CD Block.

Pathardihi Rural Hospital, with 30 beds at Pathardihi, is the major government medical facility in the Baghmundi CD block. There are primary health centres at Korang (with 6 beds), Tunturi (with 10 beds) and Ajodhya Hill (PO Ajodhya) (with 12 beds).
