= Raipur Institute of Technology =

Engineering college in Chhattisgarh, India

- Type: Private
- Established: 1995
- Principal: Dr. Manish Sakhlecha
- Director: Dr Jayesh Karia
- Location: Raipur, Chhattisgarh, India; 21.226°N 81.801°E
- Website: Official website

Raipur Institute of Technology is a Private Engineering college located in Raipur, Chhattisgarh, India. It was established by the Mahanadi Education Society in 1995. It is affiliated to Chhattisgarh Swami Vivekanand Technical University.

== History ==
Established in 1995, initially it was affiliated to Pt. Ravishankar Shukla University, Raipur and started offering Bachelor of Engineering in Chemical Engineering, Electronics & Telecommunication Engineering and Mechanical Engineering. Courses in Computer Science & Engineering (1999), Information Technology (2000) and Biotechnology (2004) were introduced. In 2005, institute became affiliated to newly formed Chhattisgarh Swami Vivekanand Technical University, Bhilai.

== Academics ==
RIT offers undergraduate and postgraduate course in Engineering along with Master of Business Administration and Master of Computer Application.

== Departments ==
RIT has following departments:

- Biotechnology
- Chemical Engineering
- Electronics & Telecommunication Engineering
- Computer Science & Engineering
- Civil Engineering
- Information Technology
- Mechanical Engineering
- Electrical & Electronics Engineering
- Master of Business Administration
- Master of Computer Application

== Alumni ==
- Biswajit Mahato, MLA from Joypur, West Bengal.
