= Shaktipada Mahato =

Member of the West Bengal Legislative Assembly
- In office 2016–2021
- Preceded by: Dhirendra Nath Mahato
- Succeeded by: Narahari Mahato
- Constituency: Joypur

Personal details
- Party: Trinamool Congress
- Profession: Politician

Shaktipada Mahato is an Indian politician from West Bengal. He was elected as a Member of the Legislative Assembly in 2016 West Bengal Legislative Assembly election from Joypur, as a member of the Trinamool Congress.
