= Mayna Murmu =

Indian politician

Member of the West Bengal Legislative Assembly
- Incumbent
- Assumed office 4 May 2026
- Preceded by: Sandhya Rani Tudu
- Constituency: Manbazar

Personal details
- Party: Bharatiya Janata Party
- Profession: Politician

Mayna Murmu is an Indian politician and member of the Bharatiya Janata Party. She was elected as a Member of the West Bengal Legislative Assembly from the Manbazar (ST) constituency in the 2026 West Bengal Legislative Assembly election.
