= Jiudaru =

- Village
- Location in West Bengal, India Jiudaru (India)
- Coordinates: 23.4131°N 86.0797°E
- Country: India
- State: West Bengal
- District: Purulia

Population (2011)
  - Total: 2,232

Languages
  - Official: Bengali, English
- Time zone: UTC+5:30 (IST)
- PIN: 723213
- Telephone/STD code: 03254
- Lok Sabha constituency: Purulia
- Vidhan Sabha constituency: Baghmundi
- Website: purulia.gov.in
- Places in Jhalda subdivision in Purulia district. Key: M: municipality, C: census town, R: rural/ urban centre, H: historical/ religious centre, X: craft centre, T: tourist centre, △: hills Owing to space constraints in the small map, the locations in the larger map on click through may vary slightly.

Jiudaru is a village in the Jhalda II CD block in the Jhalda subdivision of the Purulia district in the state of West Bengal, India.

== Geography ==
=== Location ===
Jiudaru is located at 23.4131°N 86.0797°E.

=== Area overview ===
Purulia district forms the lowest step of the Chota Nagpur Plateau. The general scenario is undulating land with scattered hills. Jhalda subdivision, shown in the map alongside, is located in the western part of the district, bordering Jharkhand. The Subarnarekha flows along a short stretch of its western border. It is an overwhelmingly rural subdivision with 91.02% of the population living in the rural areas and 8.98% living in the urban areas. There are three census towns in the subdivision. The map alongside shows some of the tourist attractions in the Ajodhya Hills. The area is home to Purulia Chhau dance with spectacular masks made at Charida. The remnants of old temples and deities are found in the subdivision also, as in other parts of the district.

== Demographics ==
According to the 2011 Census of India, Jiudaru had a total population of 2,232, of which 1,129 (51%) were males and 1,103 (49%) were females. There were 394 persons in the age range of 0–6 years. The total number of literate persons in Jiudaru was 1,081 (58.81% of the population over 6 years).

== Transport ==
Kotshila Junction railway station on the NSC Bose Gomoh-Hatia line of the South Eastern Railway is located nearby. The Purulia-Kotshila branch line connects to the NSC Bose Gomoh-Hatia line at Kotshila.

== Education ==
Kotshila Mahavidyalaya was established in 2010. Affiliated with the Sidho Kanho Birsha University, it offers honours courses in Bengali, English, history and a general course in arts.

Jiudaru High School is a Bengali-medium coeducational institution established in 1971. It has facilities for teaching from class V to class XII.

== Healthcare ==
Muralhar Kotshila Rural Hospital, with 30 beds, is the major government medical facility in the Jhalda II CD block.
