= Narahari Mahato =

Member of the 15th Lok Sabha of India

Personal details
- Born: 10 March 1956 (age 70) Selani, Purulia, West Bengal, India.
- Party: Bharatiya Janata Party; All India Forward Bloc.
- Spouse: Mrs. Abha Mahato.
- Children: 01 (daughter)
- Parent(s): Mr. Ratanchandra Mahato (father) & Mrs. Shashi Mahato (mother).
- Education: MA & BEd.
- Alma mater: Burdwan University & Ranchi University.
- Occupation: Politician, agriculturist, teacher & social worker.

Member of the West Bengal Legislative Assembly
- In office 2021–2026
- Preceded by: Shaktipada Mahato
- Succeeded by: Biswajit Mahato
- Constituency: Joypur

Member of the India Parliament for Purulia
- In office 2009–2014
- Preceded by: Bir Singh Mahato
- Succeeded by: Dr. Mriganka Mahato

Narahari Mahato is an Indian politician from Bharatiya Janata Party. He was a member of the 15th Lok Sabha from the Purulia constituency of West Bengal and was a member of the All India Forward Bloc political party.

== Education and background ==
Mahato has master's degree (MA) in Political science, history & Bengali. He belongs to a farmer family. After completing his education, he worked as a teacher (subsequently as Headmaster) in Srirampur High School in Joypur.

== Political career ==
He was a member of the 15th Lok Sabha from the Purulia elected on All India Forward Bloc political party. He joined Bharatiya Janata Party and was elected as a member of the West Bengal Legislative Assembly from Joypur (constituency). He defeated Phanibhushan Kumar of Congress by 12,102 votes in 2021 West Bengal Assembly election.

== Posts held ==
#	From	To	Position
01	19 September 2006	2009	Elected to 14th Lok Sabha in by-election
02	2006	2009	Member, Committee on Information Technology
03	2009	–	Re-elected to 15th Lok Sabha (2nd term)
04	2009	–	Leader, All India Forward Bloc Parliamentary Party, Lok Sabha
05	31 August 2009	–	Member, Committee on Coal and Steel
06	23 September 2009	–	Member, Committee on Papers Laid on the Table

== See also ==
- List of members of the 15th Lok Sabha of India

Party political offices
Preceded by	Leader of the All India Forward Bloc Party in the 15th Lok Sabha; 2009–2014	Succeeded by
