= Manbazar Assembly constituency =

Manbazar
- Constituency No. 243 for the West Bengal Legislative Assembly
- Interactive Map Outlining Manbazar Assembly Constituency

Constituency details
- Country: India
- Region: East India
- State: West Bengal
- District: Purulia
- Lok Sabha constituency: Purulia
- Established: 1957
- Total electors: 200,549
- Reservation: ST

Member of Legislative Assembly
- 18th West Bengal Legislative Assembly
- Incumbent Mayna Murmu
- Party: Bharatiya Janata Party
- Elected year: 2026

Manbazar is an assembly constituency in Purulia district in the Indian state of West Bengal. It is reserved for scheduled tribes.

== Overview ==
As per orders of the Delimitation Commission, No. 243 Manbazar Assembly constituency (ST) is composed of the following: Manbazar I and Puncha community development blocks; Chatumadar, Daldali and Manguria Lalpur gram panchayats of Hura community development block.

Manbazar Assembly constituency is part of No. 35 Purulia (Lok Sabha constituency).

== Members of the Legislative Assembly ==
Year	Member	Party
1952	Nitai Singh Sardar	Lok Sewak Sangh
1952	Satya Kinkar Mahato	Lok Sewak Sangh
1957	Satya Kinkar Mahato	Independent politician
1957	Chaitan Majhi	Independent politician
1962	Girish Mahato	Lok Sewak Sangh
1967	Girish Mahato	Independent politician
1969	Girish Mahato	Lok Sewak Sangh
1971	Sitaram Mahato	Indian National Congress
1972	Sitaram Mahato	Indian National Congress
1977	Nakul Chandra Mahata	Communist Party of India
1982	Kamala Kanta Mahato	Communist Party of India
1987	Kamala Kanta Mahato	Communist Party of India
1991	Kamala Kanta Mahato	Communist Party of India
1996	Kamala Kanta Mahato	Communist Party of India
2001	Shyamapyari Mahata	Communist Party of India
2006	Shyamapyari Mahata	Communist Party of India
2011	Sandhya Rani Tudu	All India Trinamool Congress
2016	Sandhya Rani Tudu	All India Trinamool Congress
2021	Sandhya Rani Tudu	All India Trinamool Congress
2026	Mayna Murmu	Bharatiya Janata Party

== Election results ==
=== 2026 ===
2026 West Bengal Legislative Assembly election: Manbazar
Party	Candidate	Votes	%	±%
BJP	Mayna Murmu	120,487	50.95	+9.88
AITC	Sandhya Rani Tudu	93,204	39.42	−8.91
CPI(M)	Shantimani Murmu	13,410	5.67	−2.21
NOTA	None of the above	2,111	0.89	−0.18
Majority		27,283	11.53	+4.27
Turnout		236,467	92.4	+8.16
BJP gain from AITC		Swing		

=== 2021 ===
West Bengal Legislative Assembly Election, 2021: Manbazar
Party	Candidate	Votes	%	±%
AITC	Sandhyarani Tudu	103,298	48.33	
BJP	Gouri Singh Sardar	87,782	41.07	
CPI(M)	Yamini Kanta Mandi	16,849	7.88	
NOTA	None of the above	2,291	1.07	
Majority		15,516	7.26	
Turnout		213,729	84.24	
AITC hold		Swing		

=== 2016 ===
2016 West Bengal Legislative Assembly election: Manbazar
Party	Candidate	Votes	%	±%
AITC	Sandhyarani Tudu	93,642	48.72	
CPI(M)	Ipil Murmu	83,967	43.69	
BJP	Gouri Singh Sardar	8,882	4.62	
AJSU	Bivisan Sing Sardar	1,807	0.94	
SUCI(C)	Suniti Mudi	1,356	0.71	
NOTA	None of the above	2,532	1.32	
Majority				
Turnout		192,186	84.05	
AITC hold		Swing		

=== 2011 ===
West Bengal assembly elections, 2011: Manbazar
Party	Candidate	Votes	%	±%
AITC	Sandhyarani Tudu	78,520	47.02	+1.97#
CPI(M)	Himani Hansda	73,354	43.93	−5.58#
BJP	Gouri Sardar	4,476	2.68	
JMM	Balahari Murmu	3,175		
JDP	Abhiram Besra	2,797		
Independent	Lakshi Kanta Soren	2,114		
PDS	Kartik Singh Sardar	1,339		
JVM(P)	Satyakinkar Murmu	1,220		
Turnout		166,995	83.27	
AITC gain from CPI(M)		Swing	7.55#	

.# Swing calculated on Congress+Trinamool Congress vote percentages taken together in 2006.

=== 2006 ===
In the 2006 and 2001 state assembly elections, Shamya Pyari Mahato of CPI(M) won the Manbazar assembly seat defeating his nearest rivals Kamakshya Prasad Singh Deo of Trinamool Congress and Sitaram Mahato of Trinamool Congress respectively. Contests in most years were multi cornered but only winners and runners are being mentioned. Kamalakanta Mahato of CPI(M) defeated Sitaram Mahato of Congress in 1996, Nirmal Prasad Mahato of Congress in 1991, and Sitaram Mahato of Congress in 1987 and 1982. Nakul Chandra Mahata of CPI(M) defeated Sitaram Mahato of Congress in 1977.

=== 1972 ===
Sitaram Mahato of Congress won in 1972 and 1971. Girish Mahato of Lok Sewak Sangh/ Independent won in 1969, 1967 and 1962. In 1957 Manbazar was a joint seat with one seat reserved for ST. Chaitan Majhi and Satya Kinkar Mahato, both contesting as Independents, won in 1957.
