= Sushanta Mahato =

Indian politician

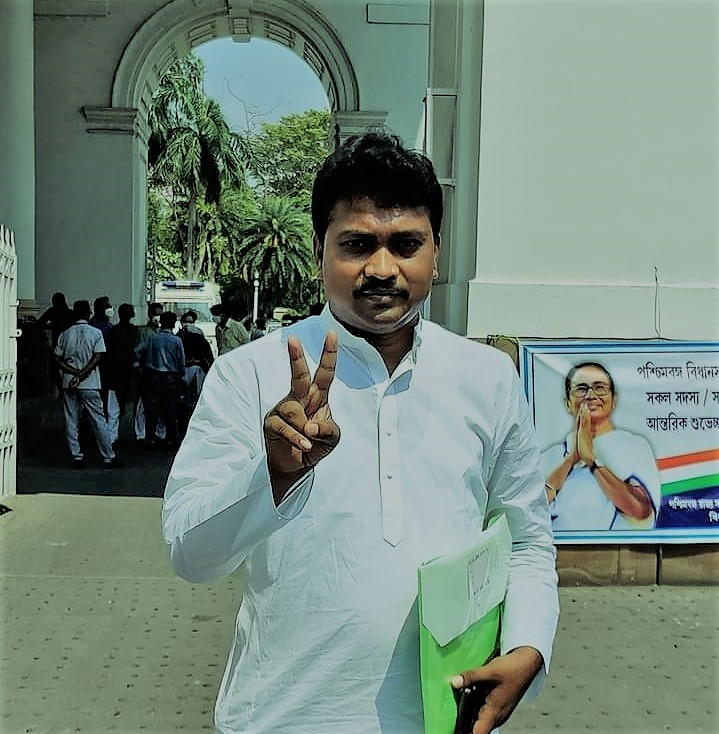

Member of the West Bengal Legislative Assembly
- In office 2 May 2021 – 4 May 2026
- Preceded by: Nepal Mahata
- Succeeded by: Rahidas Mahato
- Constituency: Baghmundi

Personal details
- Born: Baghmundi
- Party: AITC
- Education: M.A. (Bengali) From Ranchi University Year 2007
- Profession: Politician

Sushanta Mahato is an Indian politician. He is a member of All India Trinamool Congress. In May 2021, he was elected as MLA of West Bengal Legislative Assembly from Baghmundi Constituency. He is from Kotshila.
