= Bir Singh Mahato =

Indian politician (1945–2021)

Member of Parliament
- In office 1996–2006
- Constituency: Purulia

Personal details
- Born: 14 September 1945 Purulia, West Bengal
- Died: 17 April 2021 (aged 75) Purulia
- Party: All India Forward Bloc
- Spouse: Pushpa Mahato
- Children: 3 sons
- As of 17 September, 2006

Bir Singh Mahato (14 September 1945 – 17 April 2021) was an Indian politician and an MP representing the Purulia (Lok Sabha constituency) in West Bengal. As member of All India Forward Bloc, he was member of 10th, 11th, 12th, 13th Lok Sabha.

He was sentenced to ten years rigorous imprisonment by a Purulia local court for a rape case in 1983. The Calcutta High Court acquitted Bir Singh Mahato, a former Forward Bloc MP from Purulia, in the rape case.

Mahato died on 17 April 2021, aged 75.

== Sources ==
- http://archive.indianexpress.com/news/hc-acquits-former-bloc-mp-in-rape-case/532205/
- http://indianexpress.com/tag/bir-singh-mahato-rape-case/
