= Balarampur, West Bengal Assembly constituency =

West Bengal Legislative Assembly constituency

Balarampur
- Constituency No. 239 for the West Bengal Legislative Assembly
- Interactive Map Outlining Balarampur Assembly Constituency

Constituency details
- Country: India
- Region: East India
- State: West Bengal
- District: Purulia
- Lok Sabha constituency: Purulia
- Established: 1957
- Total electors: 175,023
- Reservation: None

Member of Legislative Assembly
- 18th West Bengal Legislative Assembly
- Incumbent Jaladhar Mahato
- Party: BJP
- Alliance: NDA
- Elected year: 2026

Balarampur Assembly constituency is an assembly constituency in Purulia district in the Indian state of West Bengal.

== Overview ==
As per orders of the Delimitation Commission, No. 239 Balarampur Assembly constituency is composed of the following: Balarampur community development block; Chakaltore, Dimdiha, Durku, Garafusra, Lagda and Sonaijuri gram panchayats of Purulia I community development block; and 3. Chatu Hansa, Hensla and Puara gram panchayats of Arsa community development block.

Balarampur Assembly constituency is part of No. 35 Purulia (Lok Sabha constituency).

== Members of the Legislative Assembly ==
Year	Name	Party
1957	Bhim Chandra Mahato	Lok Sewak Sangh
1962	Padak Mahata	Lok Sewak Sangh
1967	Gobardhan Majhi	Lok Sewak Sangh
1969	Gobardhan Majhi	Lok Sewak Sangh
1971	Bikram Tudu	Communist Party of India
1972	Rup Singh Majhi	Indian National Congress
1977	Bikram Tudu	Communist Party of India
1982	Bikram Tudu	Communist Party of India
1987	Bikram Tudu	Communist Party of India
1991	Bhandu Majhi	Communist Party of India
1996	Bhandu Majhi	Communist Party of India
2001	Bhandu Majhi	Communist Party of India
2006	Bhandu Majhi	Communist Party of India
2011	Santiram Mahato	All India Trinamool Congress
2016	Santiram Mahato	All India Trinamool Congress
2021	Baneswar Mahato	Bharatiya Janata Party
2026	Jaladhar Mahato	Bharatiya Janata Party

== Election results ==
=== 2026 ===
2026 West Bengal Legislative Assembly election: Balarampur
Party	Candidate	Votes	%	±%
BJP	Jaladhar Mahato	118,421	53.84	+8.62
AITC	Shantiram Mahato	83,370	37.90	−7.11
CPI(M)	Namita Mahato	6,575	2.99	
INC	Sukanta Mahato	2,830	1.29	−3.20
NOTA	None of the above	2,374	1.08	−0.15
Majority		35,051	15.94	+15.73
Turnout		219,946	93.31	+10.17
BJP hold		Swing		

=== 2021 ===
West Bengal assembly elections, 2021: Balarampur
Party	Candidate	Votes	%	±%
BJP	Baneswar Mahato	89,521	45.22	
AITC	Shantiram Mahato	89,098	45.01	
INC	Uttam Kumar Bandopadhyay	8,895	4.49	
API	Sitaram Hansda	2,153	1.09	
SUCI(C)	Dipak Kumar	1,793	0.91	
NOTA	None of the above	2,441	1.23	
Majority		423	0.21	
Turnout		197,965	83.14	
BJP gain from AITC		Swing		

=== 2016 ===
2016 West Bengal Legislative Assembly election: Balarampur
Party	Candidate	Votes	%	±%
AITC	Santiram Mahato	82,086	47.02	
INC	Jagadish Mahato	71,882	41.17	
BJP	Subhas Das	8,940	5.12	
Independent	Bimal Kanta Mahanty	2,870	1.64	
BSP	Bharati Mudi	1,860	1.07	
JDP	Anil Chandra Mandi	1,449	0.89	
Independent	Monbodh Mahato	930	0.53	
AJSU	Lal Mohan Mahato	894	0.51	
SUCI(C)	Dipak Kumar	805	0.46	
NOTA	None of the above	2,868	1.65	
Majority				
Turnout		174,594	83.46	
AITC hold		Swing		

=== 2011 ===
West Bengal assembly elections, 2011: Balarampur
Party	Candidate	Votes	%	±%
AITC	Santiram Mahato	65,244	45.79	+7.84#
CPI(M)	Manindra Gope	54,716	38.40	−17.13
Independent	Uttam Banerjee	9,529	6.69	
BJP	Batulal Mahato	3,528	2.48	
JDP	Shambhu Nath Hembram	2,897		
JMM	Pradipta Mahato	1,721		
AJSU	Sukanta Mahato	1,605		
JVM(P)	Nandalal Mahato	1,519		
Independent	Tahir Hussen Ansary	932		
IPFB	Mrityunjoy Mahato	793		
Turnout		142,484	81.41	
AITC gain from CPI(M)		Swing	24.97#	

Uttam Banerjee, contesting as an independent candidate, was a rebel Congress candidate.

.# Swing calculated on Congress+Trinamool Congress vote percentages taken together in 2006.

=== 2006 ===
In the 2006, 2001, 1996 and 1991 state assembly elections Bhandu Majhi of CPI(M) won the Balarampur assembly seat defeating his nearest rivals Barjuram Ram Singh Sardar of Trinamool Congress, Lambodar Mandi of Trinamool Congress, Dulali Mandi of Congress, and Subhas Mudi of Congress respectively. Contests in most years were multi cornered but only winners and runners are being mentioned. Bikram Tudu of CPI(M) defeated Rasik Chandra Majhi of Congress in 1987, and Rup Singh Majhi of Congress in 1982 and 1977.

=== 1972 ===
Rup Singh Majhi of Congress won in 1972. Bikram Tudu of CPI(M) won in 1971. Gobardhan Majhi of Lok Sewak Sangh/ Independent won in 1969 and 1967. Padak Mahata of LSS won in 1962. Bhim Chandra Mahato, Independent, won in 1957. Prior to that the Balarampur seat was not there.
