= Biswajit Mahato =

Indian politician from West Bengal

Member of the West Bengal Legislative Assembly
- Incumbent
- Assumed office 4 May 2026
- Preceded by: Narahari Mahato
- Constituency: Joypur, West Bengal

Personal details
- Born: Jaypur, Purulia, West Bengal, India
- Party: Bharatiya Janata Party
- Education: Raipur Institute of Technology
- Profession: Politician

Biswajit Mahato is an Indian politician from West Bengal. He won in the 2026 West Bengal Legislative Assembly election from Joypur, as a member of the Bharatiya Janata Party.
