= Sandhya Rani Tudu =

Indian politician

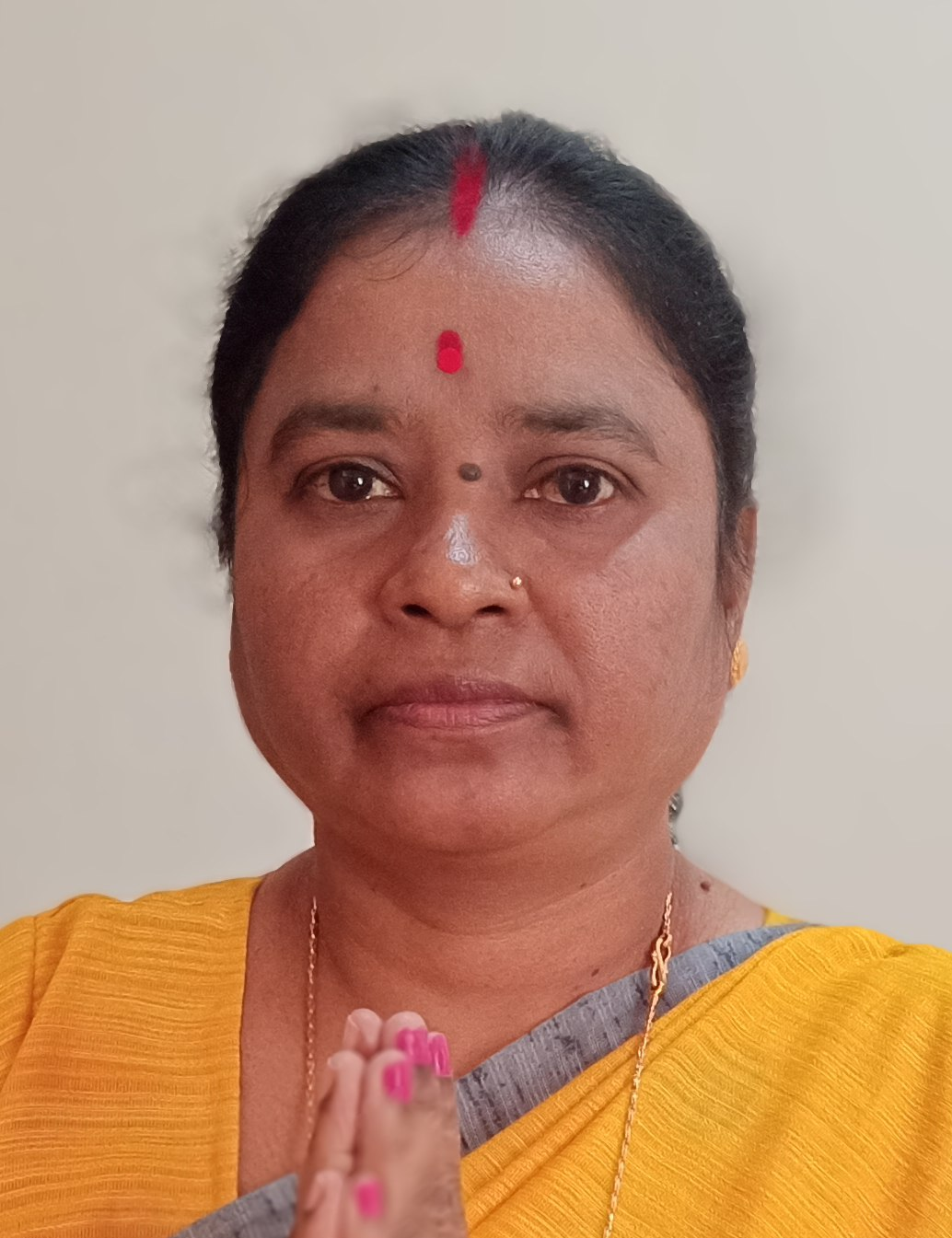

Minister of State For Paschimanchal Unnayan Affairs (Independent Charge), Government of West Bengal
- In office 10 May 2021 – 5 May 2026
- Governor: Jagdeep Dhankhar; La. Ganesan; C. V. Ananda Bose
- Chief Minister: Mamata Banerjee
- Constituency: Manbazar

Minister of State For Parliamentary Affairs, Government of West Bengal
- In office 2011–2016
- Governor: Keshari Nath Tripathi; Jagdeep Dhankhar; La. Ganesan; C. V. Ananda Bose
- Chief Minister: Mamata Banerjee

Member of West Bengal Legislative Assembly
- In office 13 May 2011 – 5 May 2026
- Constituency: Manbazar

Personal details
- Party: Trinamool Congress
- Spouse: Guru Pada Tudu
- Education: 10 pass
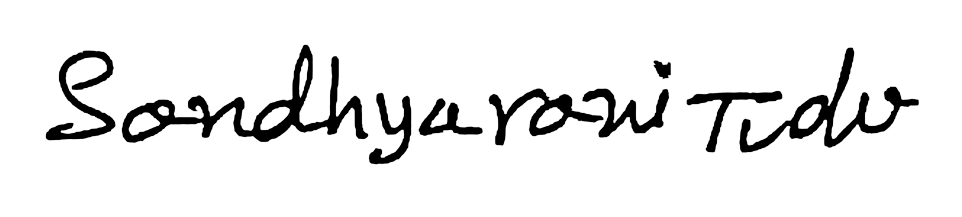
- Signature

Sandhya Rani Tudu is an Indian politician. She was elected to the West Bengal Legislative Assembly from Manbazar as a member of the Trinamool Congress.
