= Jhalda Assembly constituency =

Coordinates: 23°22′N 85°58′E

Jhalda
- Former constituency No. 237 for the West Bengal Legislative Assembly

Constituency details
- Country: India
- Region: East India
- State: West Bengal
- District: Purulia
- Lok Sabha constituency: Purulia
- Established: 1951
- Abolished: 2011
- Reservation: None

Jhalda Assembly constituency was an assembly constituency in Purulia district in the Indian state of West Bengal.

== Overview ==
As a consequence of the orders of the Delimitation Commission, Jhalda Assembly constituency ceased to exist from 2011.

It was part of Purulia (Lok Sabha constituency).

For Members of Legislative Assembly from Jhalda Assembly constituency see Baghmundi Assembly constituency

== Election results ==
=== 1977-2006 ===
In the 2006 and 2001 state assembly elections, Nepal Mahata, Congress/ Independent, won the Jhalda assembly seat, defeating his nearest rivals, Ashim Singha of Forward Bloc and Satya Ranjan Mahato of Forward Bloc. Contests in most years were multi cornered but only winners and runners are being mentioned. Satya Ranjan Mahato of Forward Bloc defeated Subhas Chandra Mahato of Congress in 1996, 1991 and 1987. Subhas Chandra Mahato of Congress defeated Satya Ranjan Mahato of Forward Bloc in 1982. Satya Ranjan Mahato of Forward Bloc defeated Subhas Chandra Mahato of Congress in 1977.

=== 1951-1972 ===
Kinkar Mahato of Congress won in 1972 and 1971. Debendra Nath Mahato of Congress won in 1969. C.Mahato of Forward Bloc won in 1967. Debendra Nath Mahato of Congress won in 1962, 1957 and in independent India’s first election in 1951 when the areas now in Purulia district were part of Bihar.
