= State Highway 4A (West Bengal) =

Road in West Bengal, India

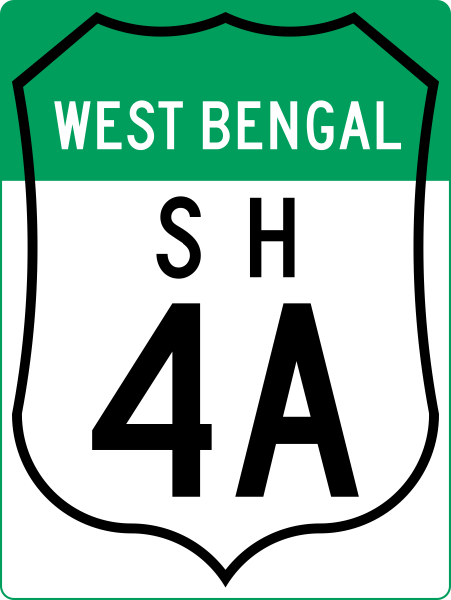
State Highway 4A

Route information
- Length: 39 km (24 mi)

Major junctions
- From: Tulin – Jn with SH 1 (Jharkhand)
- SH 4 at Jhalda
- To: Chas Morh – Jn with NH 18

Location
- Country: India
- State: West Bengal
- Districts: Purulia

Highway system
- Roads in India; Expressways; National; State; Asian; State Highways in West Bengal

State Highway 4A (West Bengal) is a state highway in West Bengal, India.

== Route ==
SH 4A originates from Tulin and passes through Jhalda and Kotshila and terminates at Chas More.

The total length of SH 4A is 39 km.

The only district traversed by SH 4A is:
Purulia district (0 - 39 km)

== See also ==
- List of state highways in West Bengal
- North-South Corridor
