= Baghmundi Assembly constituency =

West Bengal Legislative Assembly constituency

Baghmundi
- Constituency No. 240 for the West Bengal Legislative Assembly
- Interactive Map Outlining Baghmundi Assembly Constituency

Constituency details
- Country: India
- Region: East India
- State: West Bengal
- District: Purulia
- Lok Sabha constituency: Purulia
- Established: 2011
- Total electors: 191,991
- Reservation: None

Member of Legislative Assembly
- 18th West Bengal Legislative Assembly
- Incumbent Rahidas Mahato
- Party: Bharatiya Janata Party
- Elected year: 2026

Baghmundi Assembly constituency is an assembly constituency in Purulia district in the Indian state of West Bengal.

== Overview ==
As per orders of the Delimitation Commission, No. 240 Baghmundi Assembly constituency is composed of the following: Jhalda municipality; Jhalda I and Baghmundi community development blocks; Hetgugui and Sirkabad gram panchayats of Arsha community development block.

Baghmundi Assembly constituency is part of No. 35 Purulia (Lok Sabha constituency).

== Members of the Legislative Assembly ==
| Year | Name | Party |
|---|---|---|
| 2011 | Nepal Mahata | Indian National Congress |
| 2016 | Nepal Mahata | Indian National Congress |
| 2021 | Sushanta Mahato | Trinamool Congress |
| 2026 | Rahidas Mahato | Bharatiya Janata Party |

== Election results ==
=== 2026 ===
2026 West Bengal Legislative Assembly election: Baghmundi
| Party | Candidate | Votes | % | ±% |
|---|---|---|---|---|
| BJP | Rahidas Mahato | 112,663 | 48.95 | |
| AITC | Sushanta Mahato | 71,846 | 31.22 | ▼5.57 |
| INC | Nepal Mahato | 31,686 | 13.77 | ▼10.97 |
| AIFB | Parimal Kumar | 4,782 | 2.08 | ▼3.66 |
| NOTA | None of the above | 2,437 | 1.06 | ▼0.1 |
| Majority | | 40,817 | 17.73 | ▲10.96 |
| Turnout | | 230,137 | 91.7 | ▲9.05 |
| BJP gain from AITC | | Swing | | |

=== 2021 ===
West Bengal Legislative Assembly Election, 2021: Baghmundi
| Party | Candidate | Votes | % | ±% |
|---|---|---|---|---|
| AITC | Sushanta Mahato | 75,905 | 36.79 | |
| AJSU | Asutosh Mahato | 61,936 | 30.02 | |
| INC | Nepal Mahato | 51,046 | 24.74 | |
| AIFB | Debranjan Mahato | 11,842 | 5.74 | |
| AMB | Pashupati Mahato | 2,000 | 0.97 | |
| NOTA | None of the above | 2,386 | 1.16 | |
| Majority | | 13,969 | 6.77 | |
| Turnout | | 206,303 | 82.65 | |
| AITC gain from INC | | Swing | | |

=== 2016 ===
2016 West Bengal Legislative Assembly election: Baghmundi
| Party | Candidate | Votes | % | ±% |
|---|---|---|---|---|
| INC | Nepal Mahato | 88,707 | 47.16 | |
| AITC | Samir Mahato | 80,120 | 42.59 | |
| BJP | Jyotirmay Singh Mahato | 11,219 | 5.96 | |
| AMB | Pasupati Mahato | 2,047 | 1.09 | |
| AJSU | Subal Prasad | 1,863 | 0.99 | |
| Independent | Rabindra Nath Sin Mura | 1,102 | 0.59 | |
| SUCI(C) | Mrityunjoy Singh Babu | 1,016 | 0.54 | |
| NOTA | None of the above | 2,029 | 1.08 | |
| Majority | | 8,587 | 4.57 | |
| Turnout | | 188,103 | 84.18 | |
| INC hold | | Swing | | |

=== 2011 ===
West Bengal assembly elections, 2011: Baghmundi
| Party | Candidate | Votes | % | ±% |
|---|---|---|---|---|
| INC | Nepal Mahata | 77,458 | 49.48 | −2.00 |
| AIFB | Mangal Mahato | 59,814 | 38.21 | +2.33 |
| AJSU | Rakesh Mahato | 10,797 | 6.90 | |
| Turnout | | 156,549 | 81.54 | |
| INC hold | | Swing | -4.33# | |

.# Swing calculated on Congress and Forward Bloc vote percentages in 2006 in the now defunct Jhalda constituency.
