= Jaladhar Mahato =

Indian politician (born 1986)

Jaladhar Mahato (born 1986) is an Indian politician from West Bengal. He is a member of the West Bengal Legislative Assembly from the Balarampur Assembly constituency in Purulia district representing the Bharatiya Janata Party.

== Early life and education ==
Mahato is from Balarampur, Purulia district, West Bengal. He is the son of the late Anil Mahato. He passed Class 12. He is into cultivation and his wife is nurse in government employment. He declared assets worth Rs.33 lakhs in his affidavit to the Election Commission of India.

== Career ==
Mahato won the Balarampur Assembly constituency representing the Bharatiya Janata Party in the 2026 West Bengal Legislative Assembly election. He polled 1,18,421 votes and defeated his nearest rival and former two time MLA, Shantiram Mahato of the All India Trinamool Congress by a margin of 35,051 votes.
