= Rahidas Mahato =

Indian politician (born 1991)

Rahidas Mahato (born 1991) is an Indian politician from West Bengal. He is a member of the West Bengal Legislative Assembly from the Baghmundi Assembly constituency in Purulia district representing the Bharatiya Janata Party.

== Early life and education ==
Mahato is from Baghmundi, Purulia district, West Bengal. He is the son of Nakul Mahato. He completed his Master of Social Work at Kalinga University in 2021. He is a cultivator. He declared assets worth Rs.1 lakh in his affidavit to the Election Commission of India.

== Career ==
Mahato won the Baghmundi Assembly constituency representing the Bharatiya Janata Party in the 2026 West Bengal Legislative Assembly election. He polled 1,12,663 votes and defeated his nearest rival, Sushanta Mahato of the All India Trinamool Congress by a margin of 40,817 votes.
