= Joypur, West Bengal Assembly constituency =

West Bengal Legislative Assembly constituency

Joypur
- Constituency No. 241 for the West Bengal Legislative Assembly
- Interactive Map Outlining Joypur Assembly Constituency

Constituency details
- Country: India
- Region: East India
- State: West Bengal
- District: Purulia
- Lok Sabha constituency: Purulia
- Established: 1962
- Total electors: 189,787
- Reservation: None

Member of Legislative Assembly
- 18th West Bengal Legislative Assembly
- Incumbent Biswajit Mahato
- Party: BJP
- Alliance: NDA
- Elected year: 2026

Joypur Assembly constituency is an assembly constituency in Purulia district in the Indian state of West Bengal.

== Overview ==
As per orders of the Delimitation Commission, No. 241 Joypur Assembly constituency is composed of the following: Joypur and Jhalda II community development blocks; Arsha, Beldih and Manikary gram panchayata of Arsha community development block.

Joypur Assembly constituency is part of No. 35 Purulia (Lok Sabha constituency).

== Members of the Legislative Assembly ==
| Year | Member | Party |
|---|---|---|
| 1962 | Adawita Mondal | Lok Sewak Sangh |
| 1967 | Ram Krishna Mahato | Indian National Congress |
| 1971 | Ram Krishna Mahato | Indian National Congress |
| 1972 | Ram Krishna Mahato | Indian National Congress |
| 1977 | Ram Krishna Mahato | Indian National Congress |
| 1977 | Ram Krishna Mahato | Indian National Congress |
| 1982 | Shantiram Mahato | Indian National Congress |
| 1987 | Bindewar Mahata | All India Forward Bloc |
| 1991 | Bindeswar Mahata | All India Forward Bloc |
| 1996 | Shantiram Mahato | Indian National Congress |
| 2001 | Shantiram Mahato | Indian National Congress |
| 2006 | Bindeswar Mahata | All India Forward Bloc |
| 2011 | Dhirendra Nath Mahato | All India Forward Bloc |
| 2016 | Shaktipada Mahato | All India Trinamool Congress |
| 2021 | Narahari Mahato | Bharatiya Janata Party |
| 2026 | Biswajit Mahato | Bharatiya Janata Party |

== Election results ==
=== 2026 ===
2026 West Bengal Legislative Assembly election: Joypur
| Party | Candidate | Votes | % | ±% |
|---|---|---|---|---|
| BJP | Biswajit Mahato | 104,668 | 44.88 | +8.2 |
| AITC | Arjun Mahato | 82,450 | 35.36 | |
| INC | Phanibhusan Kumar | 23,263 | 9.98 | −20.69 |
| JLKM | Dibyajyoti Singh Deo | 9,152 | 3.92 | |
| AIFB | Dhirendra Nath Mahato | 5,805 | 2.49 | −7.08 |
| NOTA | None of the above | 3,239 | 1.39 | −0.07 |
| Majority | | 22,218 | 9.52 | +3.51 |
| Turnout | | 233,203 | 91.78 | +10.55 |
| BJP hold | | Swing | | |

=== 2021 ===
Dibajyoti Singh Deo, contesting as an independent candidate, was supported by the Trinamool Congress. Initially, he was a rebel Trinamool Congress candidate, but later the party supported him as the nomination of the candidate nominated by the party was rejected.

West Bengal Legislative Assembly Election, 2021: Joypur
| Party | Candidate | Votes | % | ±% |
|---|---|---|---|---|
| BJP | Narahari Mahato | 74,380 | 36.68 | |
| INC | Phanibhusan Kumar | 62,180 | 30.67 | |
| Independent | Dibyajoti Singh Deo | 35,429 | 17.47 | |
| AIFB | Dhirendra Nath Mahato | 19,413 | 9.57 | |
| Mulnibasi Party of India | Jawahar Lal Mahato | 2,102 | 1.04 | |
| Independent | Nepal Chandra Mahato | 1,980 | 0.98 | |
| NOTA | None of the above | 2,956 | 1.46 | |
| Majority | | 12,200 | 6.01 | |
| Turnout | | 202,767 | 81.23 | |
| BJP gain from AITC | | Swing | | |

=== 2016 ===
2016 West Bengal Legislative Assembly election: Balarampur
| Party | Candidate | Votes | % | ±% |
|---|---|---|---|---|
| AITC | Shaktipada Mahato | 85,026 | 47.41 | |
| AIFB | Dhirendra Nath Mahato | 76,263 | 42.52 | |
| BJP | Sripati Mahato | 8,211 | 4.58 | |
| AMB | Pitambar Tudu | 1,754 | 0.98 | |
| AJSU | Subhas Chandra Mahato | 1,576 | 0.88 | |
| SUCI(C) | Bhajahari Kumar | 1,515 | 0.84 | |
| Independent | Padmalochan Kumar | 1,356 | 0.76 | |
| JMM | Santi Ram Mandi | 813 | 0.45 | |
| NOTA | None of the above | 2,838 | 1.58 | |
| Majority | | | | |
| Turnout | | 179,352 | 82.01 | |
| AITC gain from AIFB | | Swing | | |

=== 2011 ===
2011 West Bengal state assembly election: Joypur
| Party | Candidate | Votes | % | ±% |
|---|---|---|---|---|
| AIFB | Dhirendra Nath Mahato | 62,060 | 41.48 | −5.06 |
| Independent | Sakti Pada Mahato | 51,449 | 34.39 | −10.23# |
| AITC | Kirton Chandra Mahato | 23,927 | 15.99 | +13.71# |
| BJP | Shripati Mahato | 2,637 | 1.76 | |
| Independent | Padmalochan Kumar | 2,242 | | |
| JVM(P) | Paban Mahato | 2,131 | | |
| AJSU | Swapan Mahato | 1,852 | | |
| JDP | Sanat Kumar Besra | 1,287 | | |
| AMB | Gagan Chandra Mahato | 1,136 | | |
| JMM | Sandip Majhi | 885 | | |
| Turnout | | 149,606 | 78.83 | |
| AIFB hold | | Swing | | |

Shakti Pada Mahato, contesting as an independent candidate, was a rebel Congress candidate.

.# The changes for Shakti Pada Mahato (Independent/ rebel Congress) and Trinamool Congress are shown against the vote percentages of Congress and Trinamool Congress in 2006.

=== 2006 ===
In the 2006 state assembly elections, Bindeswar Mahato of Forward Bloc won the Jaipur assembly seat, defeating his nearest rival Shantiram Mahato of Congress. Contests in most years were multi cornered but only winners and runners are being mentioned. Shantiram Mahato of Congress defeated Bindeswar Mahato of Forward Bloc in 2001 and 1996. Bindeswar Mahato of Forward Block defeated Shanti Ram Mahato of Congress in 1991 and 1987. Shantiram Mahato of Congress defeated Hari Pada Mahato of Forward Bloc in 1982. Ram Krishna Mahato of Congress defeated Chakradhar Mahato of Janata Party in 1977.

=== 1972 ===
Ramkrishna Mahato of Congress won in 1972, 1971 and 1967. Adwaita Mondal of Lok Sewak Sangh won in 1962.
