= Purulia Lok Sabha constituency =

Lok Sabha constituency in West Bengal

Coordinates: 23.3°N 86.4°E

Purulia WB-35
- Lok Sabha constituency
- Interactive Map Outlining Purulia Lok Sabha Constituency

Constituency details
- Country: India
- Region: East India
- State: West Bengal
- Assembly constituencies: Baghmundi; Manbazar; Balarampur; Kashipur; Para; Joypur; Purulia
- Established: 1957
- Total electors: 18,23,120 (2024)
- Reservation: None

Member of Parliament
- 18th Lok Sabha
- Incumbent Jyotirmoy Singh Mahato
- Party: BJP
- Alliance: NDA
- Elected year: 2024

Purulia Lok Sabha constituency is one of the present 42 Lok Sabha constituencies in West Bengal state in eastern India. India has total 543 Lok Sabha (parliamentary) constituencies. All the seven assembly segments of No. 35 Purulia Lok Sabha constituency are in Purulia district.

== Assembly segments ==
Parliamentary constituencies in West Bengal - 1. Cooch Behar, 2. Alipurduars, 3. Jalpaiguri, 4. Darjeeling, 5. Raiganj, 6. Balurghat, 7. Maldaha Uttar, 8. Maldaha Dakshin, 9. Jangipur, 10. Baharampur, 11. Murshidabad, 12. Krishnanagar, 13. Ranaghat, 14. Bangaon, 15. Barrackpore, 16. Dum Dum, 17. Barasat, 18. Basirhat, 19. Jaynagar, 20. Mathurapur, 21. Diamond Harbour, 22. Jadavpur, 23. Kolkata Dakshin, 24. Kolkata Uttar, 25. Howrah, 26. Uluberia, 27. Serampore, 28. Hooghly, 29. Arambagh, 30. Tamluk, 31, Kanthi, 32. Ghatal, 33. Jhargram, 34. Medinipur, 35. Purulia, 36. Bankura, 37. Bishnupur, 38. Bardhaman Purba, 39. Bardhaman Durgapur, 40. Asansol, 41. Bolpur, 42. Birbhum

As per order of the Delimitation Commission issued in 2006 in respect of the delimitation of constituencies in the West Bengal, parliamentary constituency no. 35 Purulia is composed of the following segments:

| # | Name | District | Member | Party | 2024 Lead |
|---|---|---|---|---|---|
| 239 | Balarampur | Purulia | Jaladhar Mahato | BJP | AITC |
| 240 | Baghmundi | Purulia | Rahidas Mahato | BJP | BJP |
| 241 | Joypur | Purulia | Biswajit Mahato | BJP | AITC |
| 242 | Purulia | Purulia | Sudip Mukherjee | BJP | BJP |
| 243 | Manbazar (ST) | Purulia | Mayna Murmu | BJP | AITC |
| 244 | Kashipur | Purulia | Kamalakanta Hansda | BJP | AITC |
| 245 | Para (SC) | Purulia | Nadiar Chand Bouri | BJP | BJP |

Prior to delimitation, Purulia Lok Sabha constituency was composed of the following assembly segments:Bandwan (ST) (assembly constituency no. 233), Manbazar (assembly constituency no. 234), Balarampur (ST) (assembly constituency no. 235), Arsha (assembly constituency no. 236), Jhalda (assembly constituency no. 237), Joypur (assembly constituency no. 238), Purulia (assembly constituency no. 239)

== Members of Parliament ==
| Year | Member | Party |
|---|---|---|
| 1952 (Note: Manbhum North) | P. C. Bose | Indian National Congress |
| 1952 | Mohan Hari | Indian National Congress |
| 1952 (Note: Manbhum South) | Bhajahari Mahato | Lok Sewak Sangh |
| 1952 | Chaitan Majhi | Lok Sewak Sangh |
| 1957 | Bibhuti Bhusan Das Gupta | Lok Sewak Sangh |
| 1962 | Bhajahari Mahato | Lok Sewak Sangh |
| 1967 | Bhajahari Mahato | Lok Sewak Sangh |
| 1971 | Debendranath Mahata | Indian National Congress |
| 1977 | Chittaranjan Mahata | All India Forward Bloc |
| 1980 | Chittaranjan Mahata | All India Forward Bloc |
| 1984 | Chittaranjan Mahata | All India Forward Bloc |
| 1989 | Chittaranjan Mahata | All India Forward Bloc |
| 1991 | Chittaranjan Mahata | All India Forward Bloc |
| 1996 | Bir Singh Mahato | All India Forward Bloc |
| 1998 | Bir Singh Mahato | All India Forward Bloc |
| 1999 | Bir Singh Mahato | All India Forward Bloc |
| 2004 | Bir Singh Mahato | All India Forward Bloc |
| 2006^ | Narahari Mahato | All India Forward Bloc |
| 2009 | Narahari Mahato | All India Forward Bloc |
| 2014 | Mriganko Mahato | Trinamool Congress |
| 2019 | Jyotirmay Singh Mahato | Bharatiya Janata Party |
| 2024 | Jyotirmay Singh Mahato | Bharatiya Janata Party |

== Election results ==
Vote share of Winning candidates
| 2024 | 40.34% |
| 2019 | 49.33% |
| 2014 | 38.87% |
| 2009 | 44.13% |
| 2006 (by-poll) | 53.03% |
| 2004 | 48.99% |
| 1999 | 51.55% |
| 1998 | 51.26% |
| 1996 | 51.02% |
| 1991 | 51.53% |
| 1989 | 56.01% |
| 1984 | 47.99% |
| 1980 | 54.78% |
| 1977 | 68.33% |
| 1971 | 51.80% |
| 1967 | 45.08% |
| 1962 | 41.78% |
| 1957 | 57.24% |
| 1952 | 22.36% |
| 1952 | 17.85% |

=== 2024 ===
2024 Indian general election: Purulia
| Party | Candidate | Votes | % | ±% |
|---|---|---|---|---|
| BJP | Jyotirmay Singh Mahato | 578,489 | 40.34 | ▼8.99 |
| AITC | Shantiram Mahato | 5,61,410 | 39.15 | ▲4.96 |
| INC | Nepal Mahato | 1,29,157 | 9.01 | ▲2.78 |
| IND | Ajit Prasad Mahato | 98,658 | 6.88 | N/A |
| NOTA | None of the Above | 17,929 | 1.25 | ▲0.65 |
| AIFB | Dhirendra Nath Mahato | 14,572 | 1.02 | ▼4.03 |
| Majority | | 17,079 | 1.19 | ▼13.91 |
| Turnout | | 1,434,018 | 78.67 | ▼3.71 |
| BJP hold | | Swing | | |

=== 2019 ===
2019 Indian general elections: Purulia
| Party | Candidate | Votes | % | ±% |
|---|---|---|---|---|
| BJP | Jyotirmay Singh Mahato | 668,107 | 49.33 | ▲42.15 |
| AITC | Mriganko Mahato | 4,63,375 | 34.19 | ▼4.68 |
| INC | Nepal Mahata | 84,477 | 6.23 | ▼15.18 |
| AIFB | Bir Singh Mahato | 68,464 | 5.05 | ▼21.04 |
| NOTA | None of the Above | 11,322 | 0.60 | ▼0.78 |
| Majority | | 2,04,732 | 15.10 | |
| Turnout | | 13,55,861 | 82.38 | |
| BJP gain from AITC | | Swing | | |

=== 2014 ===
2014 Indian general elections: Purulia
| Party | Candidate | Votes | % | ±% |
|---|---|---|---|---|
| AITC | Dr. Mriganka Mahato | 468,277 | 38.87 | N/A |
| AIFB | Narahari Mahato | 314,400 | 26.09 | −18.04 |
| INC | Nepal Mahato | 257,923 | 21.41 | −20.59 |
| BJP | Bikash Banerjee | 86,236 | 7.15 | +4.78 |
| SUCI(C) | Subarna Kumar | 11,266 | 0.93 | N/A |
| BSP | Mihir Kumar Rajwar | 9,850 | 0.81 | −1.45 |
| JVM(P) | Ajit Prasad Mahata | 9,012 | 0.74 | N/A |
| JMM | Tapas Kumar Mahato | 7,386 | 0.61 | −2.79 |
| JDP | Baidyanath Hansda | 7,168 | 0.59 | −0.16 |
| Independent | Monbodh Mahato | 6,774 | 0.56 | N/A |
| Independent | Dhiren Rajak | 5,584 | 0.46 | +0.15 |
| Independent | Purna Chandra Tudu | 4,073 | 0.33 | N/A |
| NOTA | None of the above | 16,726 | 1.38 | N/A |
| Majority | | 153,877 | 12.78 | +10.65 |
| Turnout | | 1,204,675 | 81.84 | +9.93 |
| AITC gain from AIFB | | Swing | +29.85 | |

=== 2009 ===
General Election, 2009: Purulia
| Party | Candidate | Votes | % | ±% |
|---|---|---|---|---|
| AIFB | Narahari Mahato | 399,201 | 44.13 | |
| INC | Shantiram Mahato | 379,900 | 42.00 | |
| BJP | Sayantan Basu | 21,509 | 2.37 | |
| BSP | Asit Baran Mahato | 20,499 | 2.26 | |
| JMM | Ajit Prasad Mahato | 30,799 | 3.40 | |
| Independent | Mrityunjay Mahato | 15,716 | 1.73 | |
| Independent | Mukesh Sahu | 9,183 | 1.01 | |
| Independent | Bisambar Mura | 8,739 | 0.96 | |
| JDP | Abhiram Besra | 6,857 | 0.75 | |
| AMB | Abinash Saren | 2,942 | 0.32 | |
| Independent | Dhiren Rajak | 2,876 | 0.31 | |
| Independent | Amulya Ratan Mahato | 2,354 | 0.26 | |
| JD(U) | Dhiren Chandra Mahato | 2,080 | 0.22 | |
| Independent | Umacharan Mahato | 1,863 | 0.20 | |
| Majority | | 19,301 | 2.13 | |
| Turnout | | 904,518 | 71.91 | |
| AIFB hold | | Swing | | |

=== 2006 by-election ===
2006 Purulia Lok Sabha by-election
| Party | Candidate | Votes | % | ±% |
|---|---|---|---|---|
| AIFB | Narahari Mahato | 378,501 | 53.03 | |
| INC | Shantiram Mahato | 291,468 | 40.84 | |
| IND | Subarna Kumar | 14,799 | 2.07 | |
| AMB | Abinash Saren | 8,288 | 1.16 | |
| JDP | Abhiram Besra | 6,212 | 0.87 | |
| IND | Anilkumar Chaudhuri | 5,823 | 0.82 | |
| JD(U) | Dhiren Chandra Mahato | 5,078 | 0.71 | |
| IPFB | Mrityunjoy Mahato | 3,587 | 0.50 | |
| Majority | | 87,033 | 12.19 | |
| AIFB hold | | Swing | | |

=== 2004 ===
2004 Indian general election: Purulia
| Party | Candidate | Votes | % | ±% |
|---|---|---|---|---|
| AIFB | Bir Singh Mahato | 341,057 | 48.99 | |
| INC | Shantiram Mahato | 1,95,339 | 28.06 | |
| AITC | Niyati Mahato | 1,05,127 | 15.10 | |
| BSP | Mihir Kumar Rajwar | 14,021 | 2.01 | |
| IND | Pranati Bhattacharya | 13,020 | 1.87 | |
| JDP | Ajoy Kumar Tudu | 8,762 | 1.26 | |
| IND | Nilkamal Mahato | 5,699 | 0.82 | |
| Jharkhand Party | Gomasta Prasad Soren | 3,664 | 0.53 | |
| AMB | Thakur Das Kisku | 3,536 | 0.51 | |
| JD(U) | Anil Kumar Choudhury | 3,111 | 0.45 | |
| Jharkhand Party | Dhiren Chandra Rajak | 2,883 | 0.41 | |
| Majority | | 1,45,718 | 20.93 | |
| Turnout | | | | |
| AIFB hold | | Swing | | |

=== 1999 ===
1999 Indian general election: Purulia
| Party | Candidate | Votes | % | ±% |
|---|---|---|---|---|
| AIFB | Birsingh Mahato | 351,143 | 51.55 | |
| BJP | Tapati Mahato | 1,76,273 | 25.88 | |
| INC | Nepal Mahata | 1,39,345 | 20.46 | |
| IND | Ram Chandra Mahato | 3,926 | 0.58 | |
| IND | Pranati Bhattacharya | 3,469 | 0.51 | |
| AMB | Prafulla Kumar Mahato | 2,713 | 0.40 | |
| Jharkhand Party | Gomasta Prasad Soren | 2,574 | 0.38 | |
| NCP | Sachinandan Sau | 1,310 | 0.19 | |
| IND | Shyam Chand Bauri | 443 | 0.07 | |
| Majority | | 1,74,870 | 25.67 | |
| Turnout | | 6,92,271 | 68.67 | |
| AIFB hold | | Swing | | |

=== 1998 ===
1998 Indian general election: Purulia
| Party | Candidate | Votes | % | ±% |
|---|---|---|---|---|
| AIFB | Bir Singh Mahato | 376,313 | 51.26 | |
| INC | Nepal Mahata | 2,19,176 | 29.86 | |
| BJP | Arun Gupta | 97,996 | 13.35 | |
| JMM | Ajit Prasad Mahata | 35,629 | 4.85 | |
| IND | Dhiren Chandra Mahato | 2,169 | 0.30 | |
| IND | Nepal Chandra Bauri | 1,620 | 0.22 | |
| IND | Prafulla Kumar Mahato | 1,156 | 0.16 | |
| Majority | | 1,57,137 | 21.40 | |
| Turnout | | 7,47,609 | 75.14 | |
| AIFB hold | | Swing | | |

=== 1996 ===
1996 Indian general election: Purulia
| Party | Candidate | Votes | % | ±% |
|---|---|---|---|---|
| AIFB | Bir Sing Mahato | 375,559 | 51.02 | |
| INC | Gobinda Mukherjee | 2,65,689 | 36.09 | |
| JMM | Mahato Surya Narayan | 64,141 | 8.71 | |
| BJP | Mohan Lal Choube | 17,839 | 2.42 | |
| IND | Bhusan Mahato | 4,727 | 0.64 | |
| Jharkhand Party | Gomasta Prasad Soren | 2,544 | 0.35 | |
| JMM(M) | Sunil Kumar Mahato | 2,019 | 0.27 | |
| IND | Sarit Kumar Chakraborty | 2,016 | 0.27 | |
| IND | Sukumar Das | 1,572 | 0.21 | |
| Majority | | 1,09,870 | 14.93 | |
| Turnout | | 7,65,833 | 79.18 | |
| AIFB hold | | Swing | | |

=== 1991 ===
1991 Indian general election: Purulia
| Party | Candidate | Votes | % | ±% |
|---|---|---|---|---|
| AIFB | Chitta Ranjan Mahata | 336,105 | 51.53 | |
| INC | Sanat Mukherjee | 2,10,165 | 32.22 | |
| JMM | Surja Naraiayn Mahato | 62,941 | 9.65 | |
| BJP | Ghanshyam Mahata | 25,115 | 3.85 | |
| IND | Purna Chandra Mahato | 4,261 | 0.65 | |
| IND | Sitaram Majhi | 4,048 | 0.62 | |
| IND | Swapan Ghosh | 3,060 | 0.47 | |
| Jharkhand Party | Gomasta Prasad Soren | 2,066 | 0.32 | |
| JP | Sarbeswar Mahato | 1,742 | 0.27 | |
| DDP | Sudhir Yadav | 1,669 | 0.26 | |
| IND | Sukumar Das | 747 | 0.11 | |
| HM | Sarit Kumar Chakraborty | 384 | 0.06 | |
| Majority | | 1,25,940 | 19.31 | |
| Turnout | | 6,72,089 | 73.46 | |
| AIFB hold | | Swing | | |

=== 1989 ===
1989 Indian general election: Purulia
| Party | Candidate | Votes | % | ±% |
|---|---|---|---|---|
| AIFB | Chitta Ranjan Mahata | 379,191 | 56.01 | |
| INC | Sitaram Mahato | 240,296 | 35.49 | |
| JMM | Suraj Narayan Mahato | 40,876 | 6.04 | |
| AMB | Daman Chandra Kuiry | 6,454 | 0.95 | |
| BJP | Mohan Lal Choubey | 5,233 | 0.77 | |
| IND | Sarit Kumar Chakrabarty | 2,141 | 0.32 | |
| WBS(BM) (Note: West Bengal Socialist Party (Biman Mitra)) | Ishan Chandra Kumar | 1,126 | 0.17 | |
| IND | Sukumar Das | 707 | 0.10 | |
| IND | Radha Raman Ghosh | 680 | 0.10 | |
| DDP | Ram Samujh Yadav | 347 | 0.05 | |
| Majority | | 138,895 | 20.52 | |
| Turnout | | 690,012 | 77.30 | |
| AIFB hold | | Swing | | |

=== 1984 ===
1984 Indian general election: Purulia
| Party | Candidate | Votes | % | ±% |
|---|---|---|---|---|
| AIFB | Chittaranjan Mahata | 261,460 | 47.99 | |
| INC | K. P. Singh Deo | 247,709 | 45.47 | |
| IND | Ajit Prasad Mahata | 16,790 | 3.08 | |
| IND | Sarit Kumar Chakrabartty | 5,970 | 1.10 | |
| IND | Rabi Chowdhury | 3,668 | 0.67 | |
| IND | Gomasta Prasad Soren | 2,929 | 0.54 | |
| IND | Amulya Mahata | 2,819 | 0.52 | |
| IND | Sukumar Das | 1,065 | 0.20 | |
| IND | H. B. Weston | 829 | 0.15 | |
| IND | Radha Raman Ghosh | 793 | 0.15 | |
| IND | Sudama Nisad | 737 | 0.14 | |
| Majority | | 13,751 | 2.52 | |
| Turnout | | 557,653 | 73.92 | |
| AIFB hold | | Swing | | |

=== 1980 ===
1980 Indian general election: Purulia
| Party | Candidate | Votes | % | ±% |
|---|---|---|---|---|
| AIFB | Chitta Ranjan Mahata | 227,453 | 54.78 | |
| INC(I) | Ram Pada Singha | 122,561 | 29.52 | |
| INC(U) | Priya Ranjan Das Munshi | 42,529 | 10.24 | |
| JP | Nirmalendu Dey | 11,322 | 2.73 | |
| Jharkhand Party | Prasad Saron Gomosta | 4,875 | 1.17 | |
| IND | Amulya Mahato | 2,672 | 0.64 | |
| IND | Sarit Kumar Chakraborty | 2,259 | 0.54 | |
| IND | Radharaman Ghosh | 1,539 | 0.37 | |
| Majority | | 104,892 | 25.26 | |
| Turnout | | 426,779 | 61.20 | |
| AIFB hold | | Swing | | |

=== 1977 ===
1977 Indian general election: Purulia
| Party | Candidate | Votes | % | ±% |
|---|---|---|---|---|
| AIFB | Chittaranjan Mahata | 200,985 | 68.33 | |
| INC | Pashupati Mahato | 84,433 | 28.70 | |
| IND | Jairam Majhi | 3,532 | 1.20 | |
| IND | Krishnanlal Agrawala | 3,229 | 1.10 | |
| IND | Anil Mahata | 1,964 | 0.67 | |
| Majority | | 116,552 | 39.63 | |
| Turnout | | 303,660 | 52.10 | |
| Swing to AIFB from INC | | Swing | | |

=== 1971 ===
1971 Indian general election: Purulia
| Party | Candidate | Votes | % | ±% |
|---|---|---|---|---|
| INC | Debendra Nath Mahata | 130,264 | 51.80 | |
| Lok Sewak Sangh | Bhajahari Mahato | 54,221 | 21.56 | |
| INC(O) | Nitya Ranjan Kumbhakar | 23,970 | 9.53 | |
| AIFB | Sureswar Sahu | 22,994 | 9.14 | |
| ABJS | Lakhan Chandra Mahato | 11,458 | 4.56 | |
| Jharkhand Party | Tikaram Majhi | 8,546 | 3.40 | |
| Majority | | 76,043 | 30.24 | |
| Turnout | | 263,046 | 48.75 | |
| Swing to INC from Independent | | Swing | | |

=== 1967 ===
1967 Indian general election: Purulia
| Party | Candidate | Votes | % | ±% |
|---|---|---|---|---|
| IND | B. Mahato | 120,189 | 45.08 | |
| INC | S. Mahato | 88,784 | 33.30 | |
| ABJS | R. N. Mahato | 29,031 | 10.89 | |
| IND | S. Bakshi | 28,619 | 10.73 | |
| Majority | | 31,405 | 11.78 | |
| Turnout | | 280,923 | 54.59 | |
| Swing to Independent from Lok Sewak Sangh | | Swing | | |

=== 1962 ===
1962 Indian general election: Purulia
| Party | Candidate | Votes | % | ±% |
|---|---|---|---|---|
| Lok Sewak Sangh | Bhajahari Mahato | 68,295 | 41.78 | |
| INC | Sagar Chandra Mahato | 60,882 | 37.24 | |
| CPI | Prabir Kumar Mallik | 34,299 | 20.98 | |
| Majority | | 7,413 | 4.54 | |
| Turnout | | 168,297 | 39.27 | |
| Swing to Lok Sewak Sangh from Independent | | Swing | | |

=== 1957 ===
1957 Indian general election: Purulia
| Party | Candidate | Votes | % | ±% |
|---|---|---|---|---|
| IND | Bibhuti Bhusan Das Gupta | 75,890 | 57.24 | |
| INC | Mahato Nagendra Nath Singh Deo | 56,698 | 42.76 | |
| Majority | | 19,192 | 14.48 | |
| Turnout | | 132,588 | 36.17 | |
| Independent win (new seat) | | | | |

=== 1952 ===
==== Manbhum North ====
1951–52 Indian general election: Manbhum North
| Party | Candidate | Votes | % | ±% |
|---|---|---|---|---|
| INC | Mohan Hari | 97,279 | 22.36 | |
| INC | Prabhat Chandra Bose | 92,752 | 21.32 | |
| Lok Sewak Sangh | Gupta Bibhuti Bhushan Das | 83,209 | 19.12 | |
| Lok Sewak Sangh | Nakul Sahis | 60,425 | 13.89 | |
| IND | Goswami Jagannath Achari | 47,933 | 11.02 | |
| KMPP | Sasthu Mandal | 30,466 | 7.00 | |
| FBL(MG) (Note: Forward Bloc (Marxist Group)) | Satya Bimal Sen | 23,059 | 5.30 | |
| Majority | | 4,527 | 1.04 | |
| Turnout | | 435,123 | 31.61 | |
| INC win (new seat) | | | | |

==== Manbhum South ====
1951–52 Indian general election: Manbhum South-cum-Dhalbhum
| Party | Candidate | Votes | % | ±% |
|---|---|---|---|---|
| Lok Sewak Sangh | Bhajahari Mahaton | 85,957 | 17.85 | |
| Lok Sewak Sangh | Chaitan Manjhi | 80,349 | 16.69 | |
| Jharkhand Party | Dasarath Murmu | 61,713 | 12.82 | |
| INC | M. John | 58,838 | 12.22 | |
| INC | Bibhuti Bhushan Mura | 55,638 | 11.55 | |
| IND | Khudi Ram Mahato (Baikunth) | 47,028 | 9.77 | |
| FBL(MG) | Umapada Tripathi | 36,359 | 7.55 | |
| Socialist | Munshi Ahamdin | 28,776 | 5.98 | |
| CNSPJP (Note: Chota Nagpur Santhal Parganas Janata Party) | Thakur Das Manjhi | 26,860 | 5.58 | |
| Majority | | 5,608 | 1.16 | |
| Turnout | | 481,518 | 32.94 | |
| Lok Sewak Sangh win (new seat) | | | | |

== See also ==
- Purulia district
- List of constituencies of the Lok Sabha
