= Santiram Mahato =

Indian politician

Minister for Self Help Group & Self-employment &Pachimanchal unnyan
- In office 20 May 2011 – 2 May 2021
- Governor: M. K. Narayanan
- Succeeded by: Sandhya Rani Tudu

MLA
- In office May 13, 2011 – 2 May 2021
- Governor: M. K. Narayanan
- Constituency: Balarampur

Personal details
- Born: 1953 (age 72–73)
- Party: All India Trinamool Congress
- Children: 2
- Education: Christian college Bankura
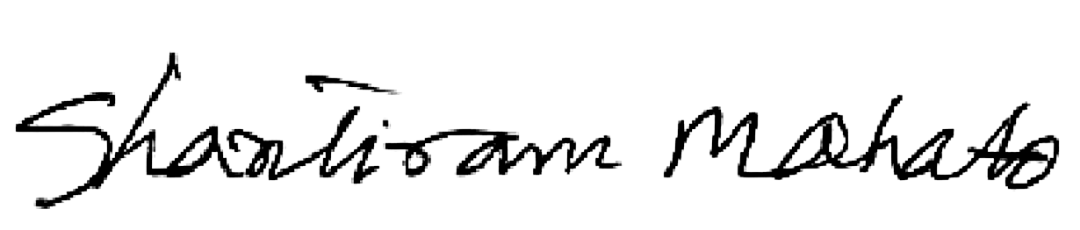
- Signature

Santiram Mahato is an Indian politician and the present Minister for Self Help Group & Self-employment and P.U.P department of Government of West Bengal. He is also an MLA, elected from the Balarampur constituency in the 2011 West Bengal state assembly election. Also prominent social worker and Presently WB State President to Hindustan Scouts and Guides Association, Manhamana Malviya Mission ITO New Delhi.

State Legislative Assembly
Preceded by ?	Member of the West Bengal Legislative Assembly from Balarampur, Purulia Assembly constituency 2011–	Incumbent
