= Nabagram, Purulia =

Nabagram
- Census Town
- Location in West Bengal, India Nabagram (India)
- Coordinates: 23°37′12.0″N 86°28′19.2″E
- Country: India
- State: West Bengal
- District: Purulia
- Subdivision: Raghunathpur

Population (2011)
  - Total: 5,963

Languages
  - Official: Bengali, English
- Time zone: UTC+5:30 (IST)
- ISO 3166 code: IN-WB
- Vehicle registration: WB
- Website: wb.gov.in

Nabagram is a census town in the Raghunathpur II CD block in the Raghunathpur subdivision of the Purulia district in West Bengal, India.

== Geography ==
Places in Raghunathpur subdivision in Purulia district
M: municipal town, CT: census town, R: rural/ urban centre, H: historical/ religious centre, T: tourist centre
Owing to space constraints in the small map, the actual locations in a larger map may vary slightly

=== Location ===
Nabagram is located at 23°37′12.0″N 86°28′19.2″E.

=== Area overview ===
Purulia district forms the lowest step of the Chota Nagpur Plateau. The general scenario is undulating land with scattered hills.Raghunathpur subdivision occupies the northern part of the district. 83.80% of the population of the subdivision lives in rural areas. However, there are pockets of urbanization and 16.20% of the population lives in urban areas. There are 14 census towns in the subdivision. It is presented in the map given alongside. There is a coal mining area around Parbelia and two thermal power plants are there – the 500 MW Santaldih Thermal Power Station and the 1200 MW Raghunathpur Thermal Power Station. The subdivision has a rich heritage of old temples, some of them belonging to the 11th century or earlier. The Banda Deul is a monument of national importance. The comparatively more recent in historical terms, Panchkot Raj has interesting and intriguing remains in the area.

Note: The map alongside presents some of the notable locations in the subdivision. All places marked in the map are linked in the larger full screen map.

== Demographics ==
According to the 2011 Census of India Nabagram had a total population of 5,963 of which 3,105 (52%) were males and 2,858 (48%) were females. There were 794 persons in the age range of 0–6 years. The total number of literate persons in Nabagram was 3,814 (74% of the population over 6 years).

As of 2001 India census, Nabagram had a population of 5,642. Males constitute 53% of the population and females 47%. Nabagram has an average literacy rate of 58%, lower than the national average of 59.5%: male literacy is 71%, and female literacy is 44%. In Nabagram, 15% of the population is under 6 years of age.

== Infrastructure ==
According to the District Census Handbook 2011, Puruliya, Nabagram covered an area of 2.88 km^{2}. There is a railway station at Santaldih, 2 km away. Among the civic amenities, the protected water supply involved overhead tank, tube-well, bore-well, tap water from treated source. It had 435 domestic electric connections. Among the medical facilities it had 1 veterinary hospital, 2 medicine shops. Among the educational facilities it had were 4 primary schools, 1 middle school, 1 secondary school, the nearest senior secondary school at Santaldih 3 km away, the nearest general degree college at Raghunathpur 20 km away.

== Economy ==
Ispat Damodar of the Eurasia group producing sponge iron, mild steel billets and ferro alloys have their manufacturing facilities at Nabagram.

== Culture ==
Banda Deul, located nearby, an 11th-century temple, is a monument of national importance.
