= Santaldih =

Census town in Purulia district, West Bengal, India

- Census Town
- Location in West Bengal, India Santaldih (India)
- Coordinates: 23°36′00.0″N 86°28′19.2″E
- Country: India
- State: West Bengal
- District: Purulia

Population (2001)
  - Total: 4,678

Languages
  - Official: Bengali, English
- Time zone: UTC+5:30 (IST)
- ISO 3166 code: IN-WB
- Vehicle registration: WB
- Website: purulia.gov.in

Santaldih is a census town in the Raghunathpur II CD block in the Raghunathpur subdivision of the Purulia district in the Indian state of West Bengal.

== Geography ==
Places in Raghunathpur subdivision in Purulia district
M: municipal town, CT: census town, R: rural/ urban centre, H: historical/ religious centre, T: tourist centre
Owing to space constraints in the small map, the actual locations in a larger map may vary slightly

=== Location ===
Santaldih Thermal Power Project Town is shown in the Para CD block in the map of the block on page 191 in the District Census Handbook, Puruliya. Santaldih is shown in the Raghunathpur II CD block in the map of the block on page 237. The township as a whole is spread across both the Ragunathpur II and Para CD blocks. The map of the Purulia district on the fifth page of the census handbook shows Santaldih police station in the Ragunathpur II CD block. We are accordingly showing Santaldih in the Raghunathpur II CD block. However, for demographic purposes the census town is being shown in the Para CD block.

=== Area overview ===
Purulia district forms the lowest step of the Chota Nagpur Plateau. The general scenario is undulating land with scattered hills. Raghunathpur subdivision occupies the northern part of the district. 83.80% of the population of the subdivision lives in rural areas. However, there are pockets of urbanization and 16.20% of the population lives in urban areas. There are 14 census towns in the subdivision. It is presented in the map given alongside. There is a coal mining area around Parbelia and two thermal power plants are there – the 500 MW Santaldih Thermal Power Station and the 1200 MW Raghunathpur Thermal Power Station. The subdivision has a rich heritage of old temples, some of them belonging to the 11th century or earlier. The Banda Deul is a monument of national importance. The comparatively more recent in historical terms, Panchkot Raj has interesting and intriguing remains in the area.

Note: The map alongside presents some of the notable locations in the subdivision. All places marked in the map are linked in the larger full screen map.

== Demographics ==
According to the 2011 Census of India, Santaldih Power Project Town had a total population of 2,507 of which 1,371 (55%) were males and 1,136 (45%) were females. There were 208 persons in the age range of 0 to 6 years. The total number of literate people in Santaldih Thermal Power Township was 2,217 (92.49% of the population over 6 years).

According to the 2011 Census of India Santaldih had a total population of 961 of which 524 were males and 437 were females. There were 110 persons in the age range of 0 to 6 years. The total number of literate people in Santaldih Thermal Power Township was 617.

As of 2001 India census, Santaldih Power Project Town had a population of 4678. Males constitute 56% of the population and females 44%. S.T. Power Project Town has an average literacy rate of 88%, higher than the national average of 59.5%: male literacy is 93%, and female literacy is 82%. In S.T. Power Project Town, 7% of the population is under 6 years of age.

== Infrastructure ==
According to the District Census Handbook 2011, Puruliya, Santaldih Thermal Power Project Town covered an area of 4.95 km^{2}. There is a railway station at Santaldih, 3 km away. Among the civic amenities, it had 40 km roads with both open and closed drains, the protected water supply involved overhead tank, tap water from treated source. It had 2,080 domestic electric connections and 3,908 road light points. Among the medical facilities it had 1 dispensary/ health centre, 1 family welfare centre, 1 maternity and child welfare centre, 1 veterinary hospital, 4 medicine shops. Among the educational facilities it had were 3 primary schools, 3 middle schools, 3 secondary schools, 3 senior secondary schools, the nearest general degree college at Raghunathpur 25 km away. Among the social, recreational and cultural facilities, it had 1 auditorium/ common room. It had the branch of 1 nationalised bank and 1 non-agricultural credit society.

== Civic administration ==
=== Police station ===
Santaldih police station, along with Para police station, has jurisdiction over Para CD Block and sole jurisdiction over Raghunathpur II CD Block. The area covered is 98.34 km^{2} and the population covered is 54,667. The Damodar River flows along the northern border of the police station and Sindri, in Dhanbad district of Jharkhand, is located across the river.

== Economy ==
West Bengal Power Development Corporation operates 2 X 250 MW Santaldih Thermal Power Station. and Bhojudih Coal washery Santaldih

== Transport ==
There is a station at Santaldih on the Adra-Gomoh branch line.

== Education ==
Santaldih College was established in 2008 at Usir, PO Chatarmahul.

Santaldih Thermal Power Boys High School is a Bengali-medium boys only institution established in 1973. It has facilities for teaching from class V to class XII.

Santaldih Thermal Power Girls’ High School is a Bengali-medium girls only institution established in 1984. It has facilities for teaching from class V to class XII.

Chakbad High School is a Bengali-medium coeducational institution established in 1951. It has facilities for teaching from class V to class XII.

== Culture ==
Banda Deul, located nearby, an 11th century temple, is a monument of national importance.

== Healthcare ==
Santaldih Thermal Hospital at Santaldih functions with 10 beds.
