= Cheliyama =

- Village
- Chelyama
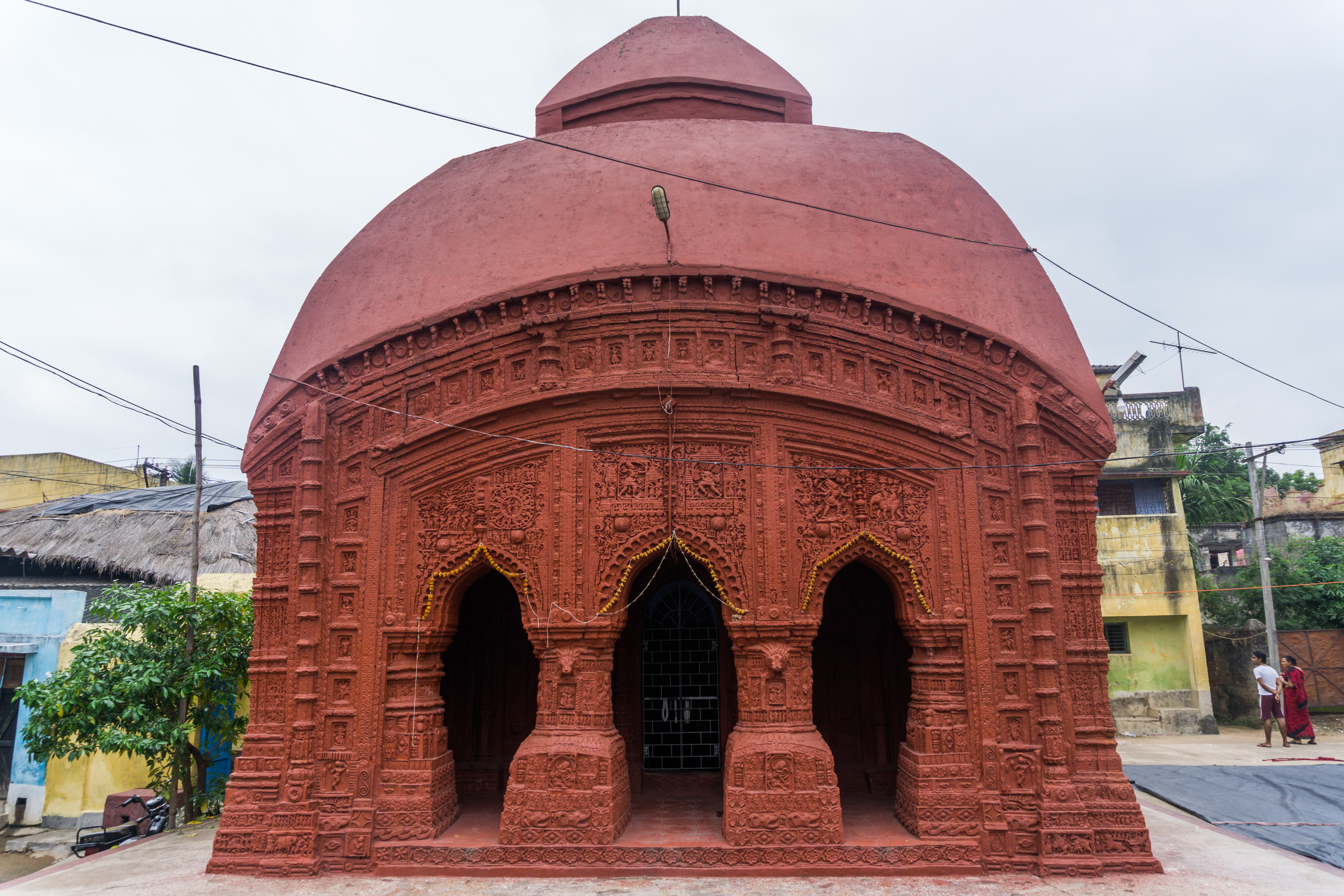
- Radha Vinod temple at Cheliyama

- Location in West Bengal, India Cheliyama (India)
- Coordinates: 23°37′01.2″N 86°33′10.8″E
- Country: India
- State: West Bengal
- District: Purulia

Population (2011)
  - Total: 7,413

Languages
  - Official: Bengali, English
- Time zone: UTC+5:30 (IST)
- Telephone/STD code: 03251
- Lok Sabha constituency: Purulia
- Vidhan Sabha constituency: Para
- Website: purulia.gov.in

Cheliyama (also referred to as Cheyama) is a village in the Raghunathpur II CD block in the Raghunathpur subdivision of the Purulia district in the state of West Bengal, India.

== Geography ==
Places in Raghunathpur subdivision in Purulia district
M: municipal town, CT: census town, R: rural/ urban centre, H: historical/ religious centre, T: tourist centre
Owing to space constraints in the small map, the actual locations in a larger map may vary slightly

=== Location ===
Cheliyama is located at 23°37′01.2″N 86°33′10.8″E.

=== Area overview ===
Purulia district forms the lowest step of the Chota Nagpur Plateau. The general scenario is undulating land with scattered hills. Raghunathpur subdivision occupies the northern part of the district. 83.80% of the population of the subdivision lives in rural areas. However, there are pockets of urbanization and 16.20% of the population lives in urban areas. There are 14 census towns in the subdivision. It is presented in the map given alongside. There is a coal mining area around Parbelia and two thermal power plants are there – the 500 MW Santaldih Thermal Power Station and the 1200 MW Raghunathpur Thermal Power Station. The subdivision has a rich heritage of old temples, some of them belonging to the 11th century or earlier. The Banda Deul is a monument of national importance. The comparatively more recent in historical terms, Panchkot Raj has interesting and intriguing remains in the area.

Note: The map alongside presents some of the notable locations in the subdivision. All places marked in the map are linked in the larger full screen map.

== Demographics ==
According to the 2011 Census of India, Cheyama had a total population of 7,413 of which 3,809 (51%) were males and 3,604 (49%) were females. There were 853 persons in the age range of 0–6 years. The total number of literate persons in Cheyama was 4,758 (72.53% of the population over 6 years).

== Civic administration ==
=== CD block HQ ===
The headquarters of Raghunathpur II CD block are located at Chelyama.

== Transport ==
The State Highway 8 running from Santaldih (in the Purulia district) to Majhdia (in the Nadia district) passes through Chelyama.

== Education ==
Santaldih College was established in 2008 at Usir, PO Chatarmahul.

Cheleyma Bijoli Prova High School is a Bengali-medium coeducational institution established in 1945. It has facilities for teaching from class V to class XII. It has a library with 2,100 books.

Cheleyama B.C.Girls H.S. High School is a Bengali-medium girls only institution established in 1960. It has facilities for teaching from class V to class XII.

== Culture ==
There is a Radha Vinod temple, dated 1619 Sakabda (around 17th century), at Cheliyama. The richly decorated terracotta depict Krishnalila (divine love of Krishna) and Ramayana scenes.

Achkoda, like Cheliyama, showcases aatchala-style temples with terracotta work on the walls. One of these temple is dedicated to Raghunath and it was constructed by the local landlord of the area. Other temples are mortuary temples of vaishanava sadhaks.

There is an 11th-century rekha deul at Banda, 1 km away.

== Terracotta panels in Radha Vinod temple ==
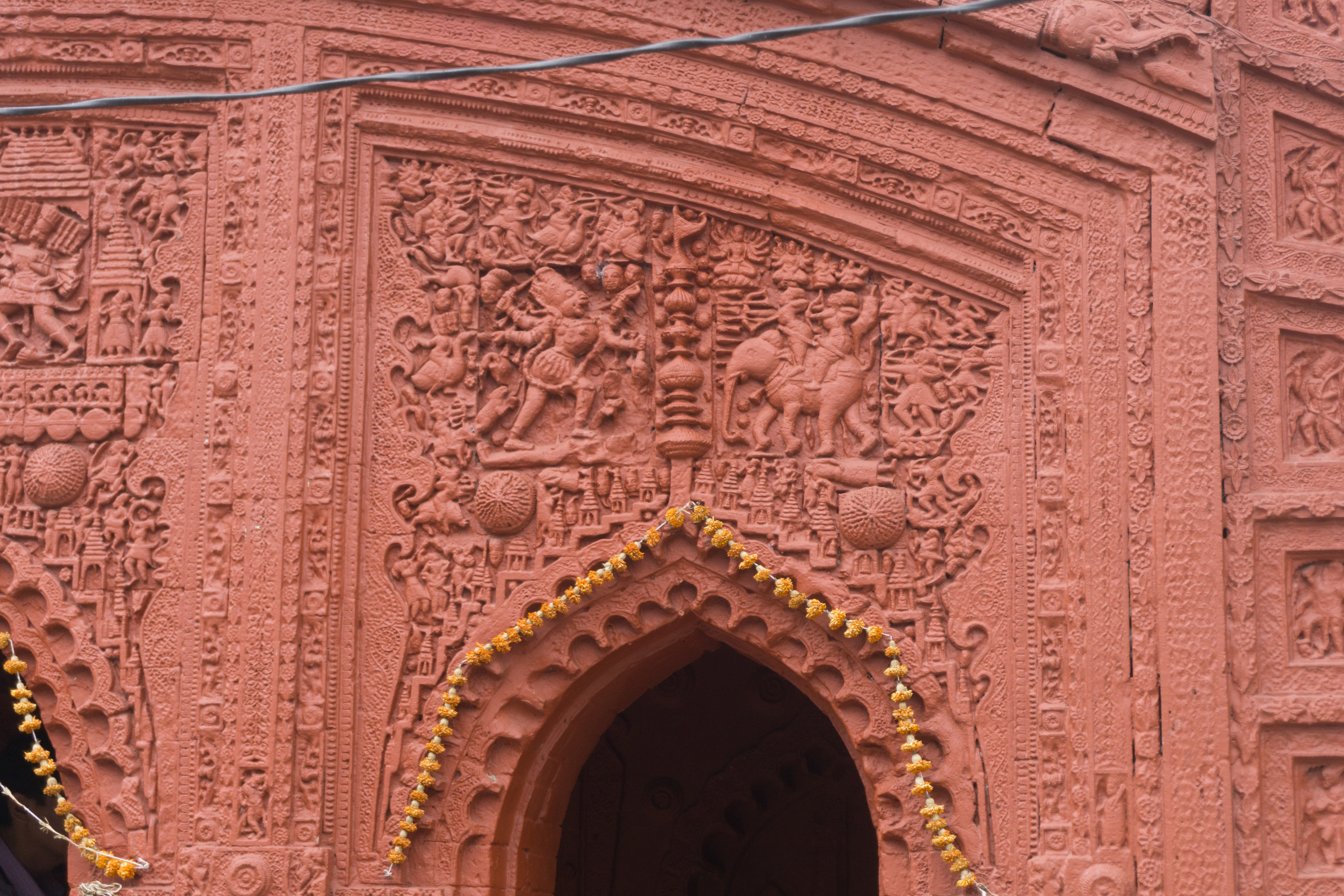
Front side of the temple - Ramayana war scene

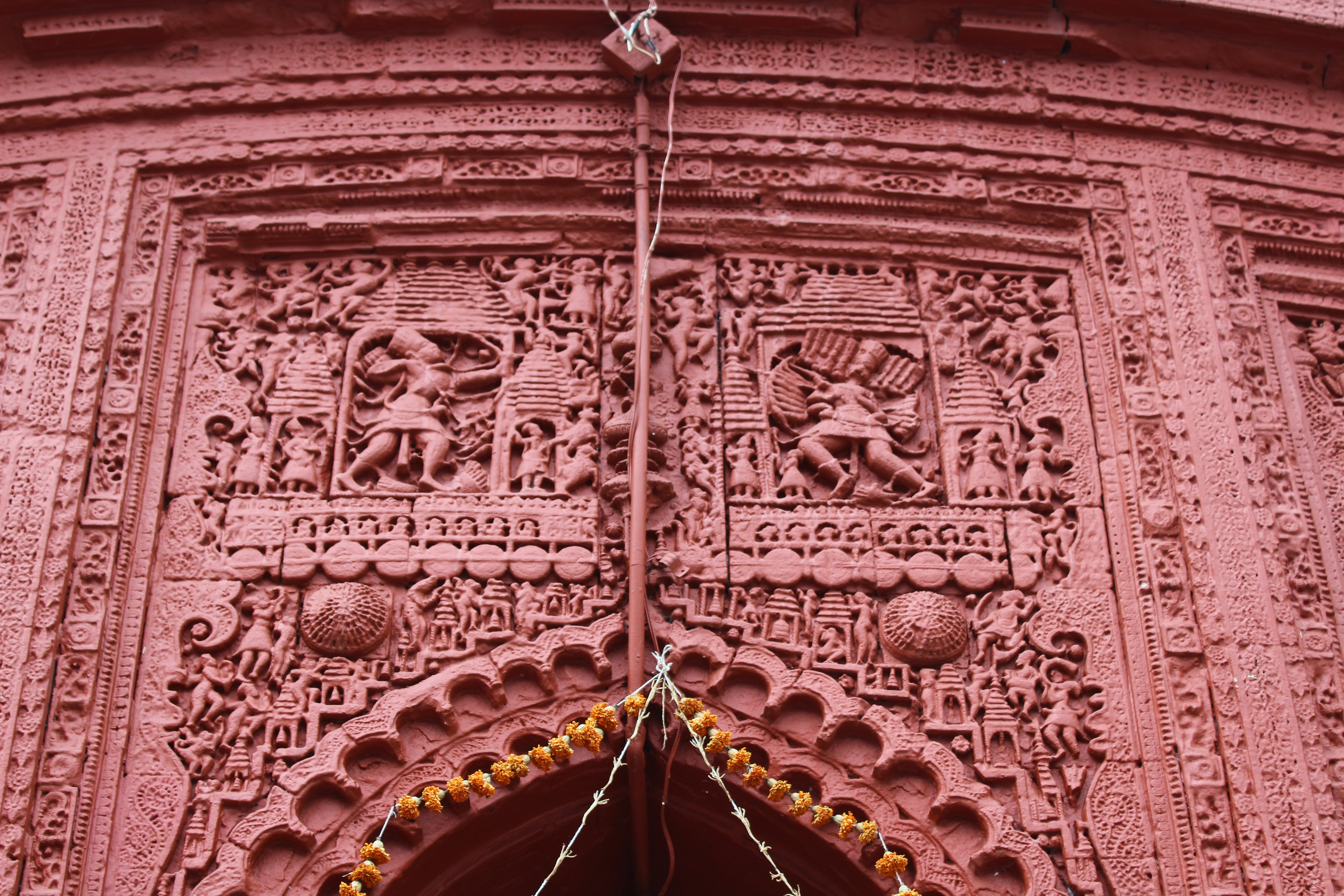
Central arch of the temple - Rama confronting Ravana in the Ramayana war

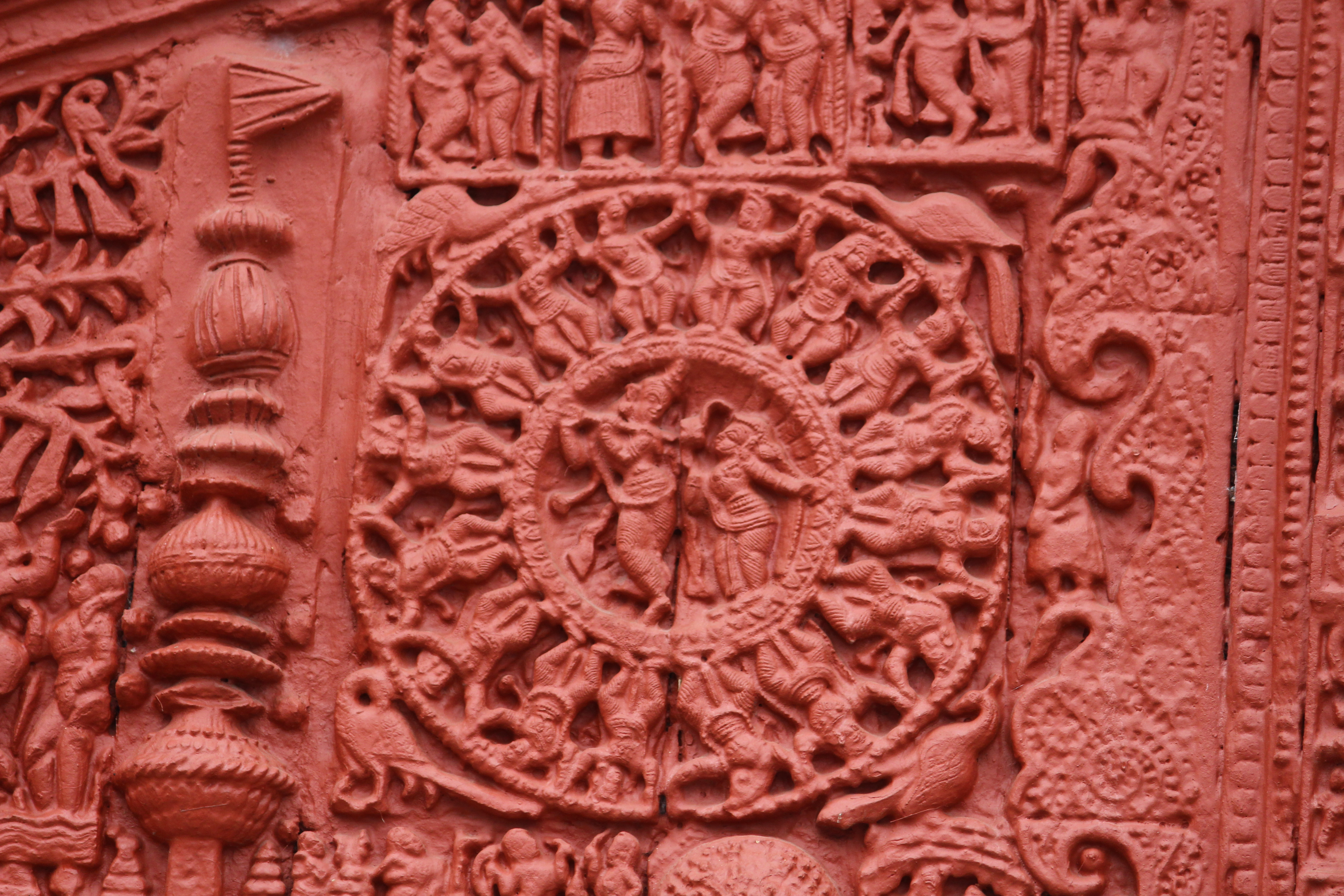
Radha-Krishna Ras Leela at Vrindavan-Braj bhoomi

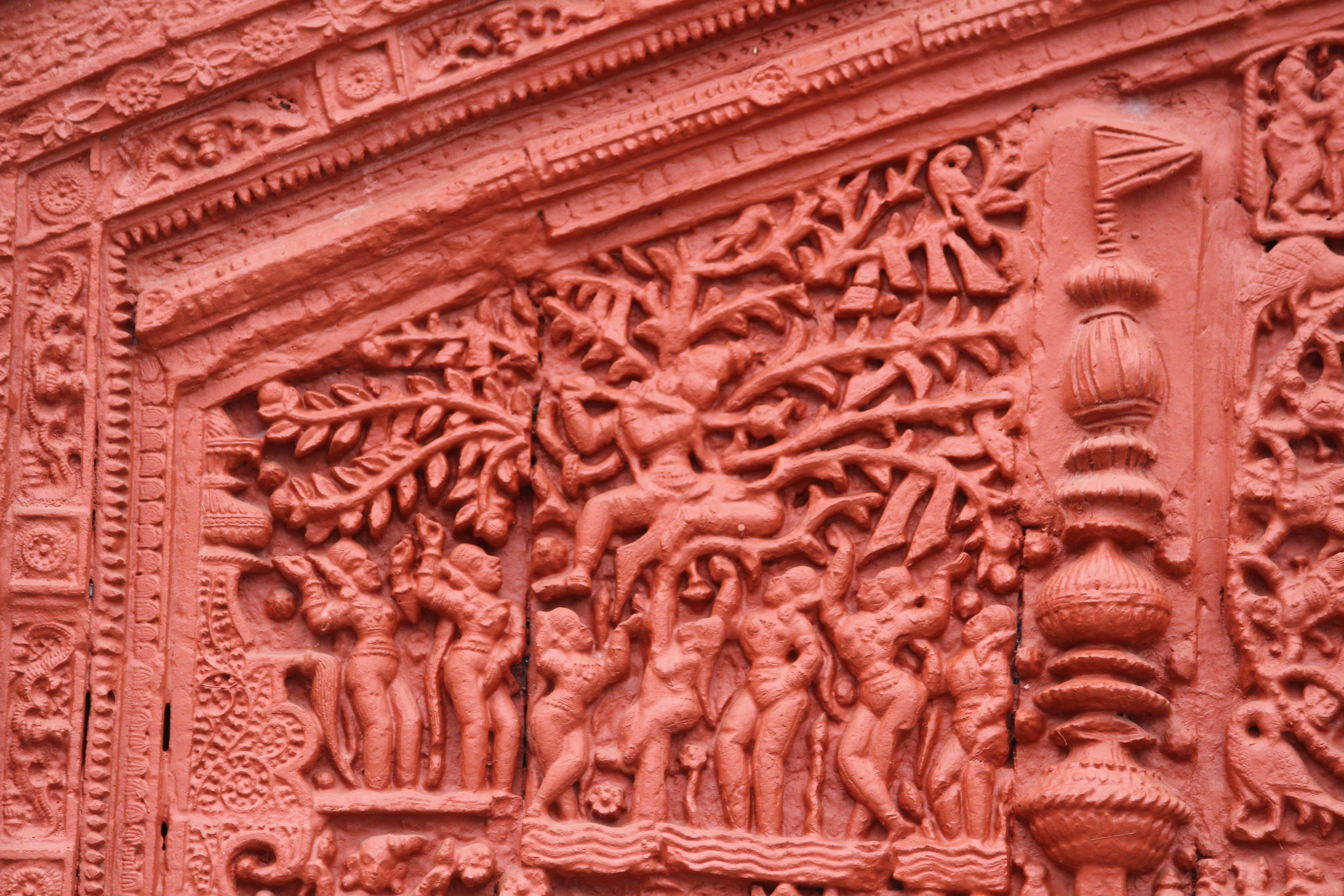
Gopikas plead with Krishna to return their clothes

== Healthcare ==
Banda (Cheliyama) Rural Hospital, with 30 beds at Cheliyama, is the major government medical facility in the Raghunathpur II CD block.
