= Raghunathpur College =

College in West Bengal

- Type: Undergraduate college Public college
- Established: 1961; 65 years ago
- Affiliations: Sidho Kanho Birsha University
- President: Sri Purna Chandra Bauri
- Principal: Dr. Phalguni Mukhapadhyay
- Location: Raghunathpur, West Bengal, 723133, India; 23.531276°N 86.6533733°E
- Campus: Urban
- Website: Raghunathpur College

- Location within West Bengal Location within India

Raghunathpur College, established in 1961, is one of the oldest colleges in Raghunathpur, Purulia district. It offers undergraduate courses in Arts, Commerce and sciences. The College is affiliated with Sidho Kanho Birsha University.

== Departments ==
=== BCA ===
- C
- C++
- JAVA

=== Science ===
- Chemistry
- Physics
- Mathematics
- Botany
- Zoology

=== Arts and Commerce ===
- Economics
- Commerce
- English
- Bengali
- Santhali
- Sanskrit
- History
- Political Science
- Philosophy
- geography

== Accreditation ==
The college is recognized by the University Grants Commission (UGC). It was accredited by the National Assessment and Accreditation Council (NAAC), and awarded B grade, an accreditation that has since then expired.

== Notable alumni ==
- Timir Biswas, singer

== See also ==
- List of institutions of higher education in West Bengal
- Education in India
- Education in West Bengal
