= Raghunathpur I =

- Community development block
- Location in West Bengal
- Coordinates: 23°32′20″N 86°40′41″E
- Country: India
- State: West Bengal
- District: Purulia
- Parliamentary constituency: Bankura
- Assembly constituency: Raghunathpur

Area
  - Total: 201.82 km^{2} (77.92 sq mi)
- Elevation: 176 m (577 ft)

Population (2011)
  - Total: 117,760
  - Density: 583.49/km^{2} (1,511.2/sq mi)
- Time zone: UTC+5.30 (IST)
- PIN: 723133 (Raghunathpur)
- Telephone/STD code: 03251
- Vehicle registration: WB-55, WB-56
- Literacy Rate: 67.36 per cent
- Website: http://purulia.gov.in/

Raghunathpur I is a community development block (CD block) that forms an administrative division in the Raghunathpur subdivision of the Purulia district in the Indian state of West Bengal.

== History ==
=== Background ===
The Jaina Bhagavati-Sutra of the 5th century AD mentions that Purulia was one of the sixteen mahajanapadas and was a part of the kingdom known as Vajra-bhumi in ancient times. In 1833, the Manbhum district was carved out of the Jungle Mahals district, with headquarters at Manbazar. In 1838, the headquarters was transferred to Purulia. After independence, when Manbhum district was a part of Bihar, efforts were made to impose Hindi on the Bengali-speaking majority of the district and it led to the Bengali Language Movement (Manbhum). In 1956, the Manbhum district was partitioned between Bihar and West Bengal under the States Reorganization Act and the Bihar and West Bengal (Transfer of Territories) Act 1956.

== Geography ==
CD blocks in Purulia district

Raghunathpur is located at 23°32′20″N 86°40′41″E.

The Raghunathpur I CD block is located in the central part of the district. The Damodar Dwaraka upland is an extension of the Chota Nagpur Plateau. The area is undulating with hillocks of hard rocks.

The Raghunathpur I CD block is bounded by the Raghunathpur II and Neturia CD blocks on the north, the Santuri CD block on the east, the Kashipur CD block on the south and the Para CD block on the west.

The Raghunathpur I CD Block has an area of 201.82 km^{2}. It has one panchayat samity, seven gram panchayats, 89 gram sansads (village councils), 106 mouzas, 90 inhabited villages and one census town. Raghunathpur police station serves this block. Headquarters of this CD block is at Raghunathpur.

Gram panchayats of the Raghunathpur I block/panchayat samiti are: Arrah, Barugram, Bero, Chorpahari, Khajura, Nutandih and Sanka.

== Demographics ==
=== Population ===
According to the 2011 Census of India, the Raghunathpur I CD block had a total population of 117,760, of which 96,488 were rural ad 21,272 were urban. There were 60,897 (52%) males and 56,863 (48%) females. There were 14,723 persons in the age range of 0 to 6 years. The Scheduled Castes numbered 41,649 (35.37%) and the Scheduled Tribes numbered 12,599 (10.70%).

According to the 2001 census, the Raghunathpur I CD block had a total population of 103,620, out of which 53,416 were males and 50,204 were females. the Raghunathpur I CD block registered a population growth of 12.12 per cent during the 1991-2001 decade. Decadal growth for the Purulia district was 13.96 per cent. Decadal growth in West Bengal was 17.84 per cent.

Census towns in Raghunathpur I CD block are (2011 census figures in brackets): Arra (21,272).

Large villages (with 4,000+ population) in the Raghunathpur I CD block are (2011 census figures in brackets): Shanka (4,233) and Paschim Bero (5,699).

Other villages in the Raghunathpur I CD block are (2011 census figures in brackets): Purbbo Bero (2,956), Khajura (1,871) and Chorpahari (1,103).

=== Literacy ===
According to the 2011 census the total number of literate persons in the Raghunathpur I CD block was 69,408 (67.36% of the population over 6 years) out of which males numbered 42,030 (78.73% of the male population over 6 years) and females numbered 27,378 (55.14%) of the female population over 6 years). The gender disparity (the difference between female and male literacy rates) was 23.60%.

See also – List of West Bengal districts ranked by literacy rate

Literacy in CD blocks of
Purulia district
Purulia Sadar subdivision
Arsha – 57.48%
Balarampur – 60.40%
Hura – 68.79%
Purulia I – 78.37%
Purulia II – 63.39%
Manbazar subdivision
Barabazar – 63.27
Bandwan – 61.38%
Manbazar I – 63.78%
Manbazar II – 60.27%
Puncha – 68.14%
Jhalda subdivision
Baghmundi – 57.17%
Jhalda I – 66.18%
Jhalda II – 54.76%
Joypur – 57.94%
Raghunathpur subdivision
Para – 65.62%
Raghunathpur I – 67.36%
Raghunathpur II – 67.29%
Neturia – 65.14%
Santuri – 64.15%
Kashipur – 71.06%
2011 Census: CD Block Wise

Primary Census Abstract Data

=== Language and religion ===
Religion in Raghunathpur I CD block (2011)
Hinduism	85.80%
Islam	10.00%
Other (tribal religion)	3.17%
Christianity	0.56%
Other or not stated	0.47%

In the 2011 census, Hindus numbered 101,047 and formed 85.80% of the population in the Raghunathpur I CD block. Muslims numbered 11,776 and formed 10.00% of the population. Christians numbered 656 and formed 0.56% of the population. Others numbered 4,281 and formed 3.64% of the population. Others include Addi Bassi, Marang Boro, Santal, Saranath, Sari Dharma, Sarna, Alchchi, Bidin, Sant, Saevdharm, Seran, Saran, Sarin, Kheria, and other religious communities. In 2001, Hindus were 86.97%, Muslims 8.90%, Christians 0.57% and tribal religions 3.20% of the population respectively.

Languages of Raghunathpur I CD block (2011)
1. Bengali (84.7%)
2. Santali (8.01%)
3. Hindi (6.16%)
4. Others (1.10%)

At the time of the 2011 census, 84.73% of the population spoke Bengali, 8.01% Santali and 6.16% Hindi as their first language.

== Rural poverty ==
According to the Rural Household Survey in 2005, 32.85% of total number of families were BPL families in Purulia district. According to a World Bank report, as of 2012, 31-38% of the population in Purulia, Murshidabad and Uttar Dinajpur districts were below poverty level, the highest among the districts of West Bengal, which had an average 20% of the population below poverty line.

== Economy ==
=== Livelihood ===
Livelihood
in Raghunathpur I CD block
1. Cultivators (14.0%)
2. Agricultural labourers (29.6%)
3. Household industries (3.55%)
4. Other Workers (52.8%)

In the Raghunathpur I CD block in 2011, among the class of total workers, cultivators numbered 5,606 and formed 13.98%, agricultural labourers numbered 11,881 and formed 29.64%, household industry workers numbered 1,422 and formed 3.55% and other workers numbered 21,178 and formed 52.83%. Total workers numbered 40,087 and formed 34.04% of the total population, and non-workers numbered 77,673 and formed 65.96% of the population.

Note: In the census records a person is considered a cultivator, if the person is engaged in cultivation/ supervision of land owned by self/government/institution. When a person who works on another person's land for wages in cash or kind or share, is regarded as an agricultural labourer. Household industry is defined as an industry conducted by one or more members of the family within the household or village, and one that does not qualify for registration as a factory under the Factories Act. Other workers are persons engaged in some economic activity other than cultivators, agricultural labourers and household workers. It includes factory, mining, plantation, transport and office workers, those engaged in business and commerce, teachers, entertainment artistes and so on.

=== Infrastructure ===
There are 79 inhabited villages in the Raghunathpur I CD block, as per the District Census Handbook, Puruliya, 2011, 100% villages have power supply. 76 villages (96.20%) have drinking water supply. 12 villages (15.19%) have post offices. 69 villages (87.34%) have telephones (including landlines, public call offices and mobile phones). 27 villages (34.18%) have pucca (paved) approach roads and 23 villages (29.11%) have transport communication (includes bus service, rail facility and navigable waterways). 2 villages (2.53%) have agricultural credit societies and 5 villages (6.33%) have banks.

=== Industries ===
The Raghunathpur Thermal Power Station of the Damodar Valley Corporation has a capacity of 1,200 MW (2x600). Both the units have gone into commercial operations in March 2016.

Land was sold in the Raghunathpur industrial park to the Jai Balaji group, Adhunik Corporation, Shyam Steel and other companies. The land had been acquired between 2007 and 2010. However, none of the projects have matured, till September 2016, because of a slump in the steel industry.

=== Agriculture ===
In 2013–14, persons engaged in agriculture in the Raghunathpur I CD block could be classified as follows: bargadars 6.62%, patta (document) holders 13.16%, small farmers (possessing land between one and two hectares) 3.53%, marginal farmers (possessing land up to 1 hectare) 32.94% and agricultural labourers 43.74%.

In 2013–14, the total area irrigated in the Raghunathpur I CD block was 9,075.24 hectares, out of which 7,749.54 hectares by tank water, 47.00 hectares by river lift irrigation, 243.20 hectares by open dug wells and 1,035.50 hectares by other means.

In 2013–14, the Raghunathpur I CD block produced 3,158 tonnes of Aman paddy, the main winter crop, from 1,540 hectares. It also produced wheat, maskalai and mustard.

=== Banking ===
In 2013–14, the Raghunathpur I CD block had offices of eight commercial banks and five gramin banks.

=== Backward Regions Grant Fund ===
The Purulia district is listed as a backward region and receives financial support from the Backward Regions Grant Fund. The fund, created by the Government of India, is designed to redress regional imbalances in development. As of 2012, 272 districts across the country were listed under this scheme. The list includes 11 districts of West Bengal.

== Transport ==
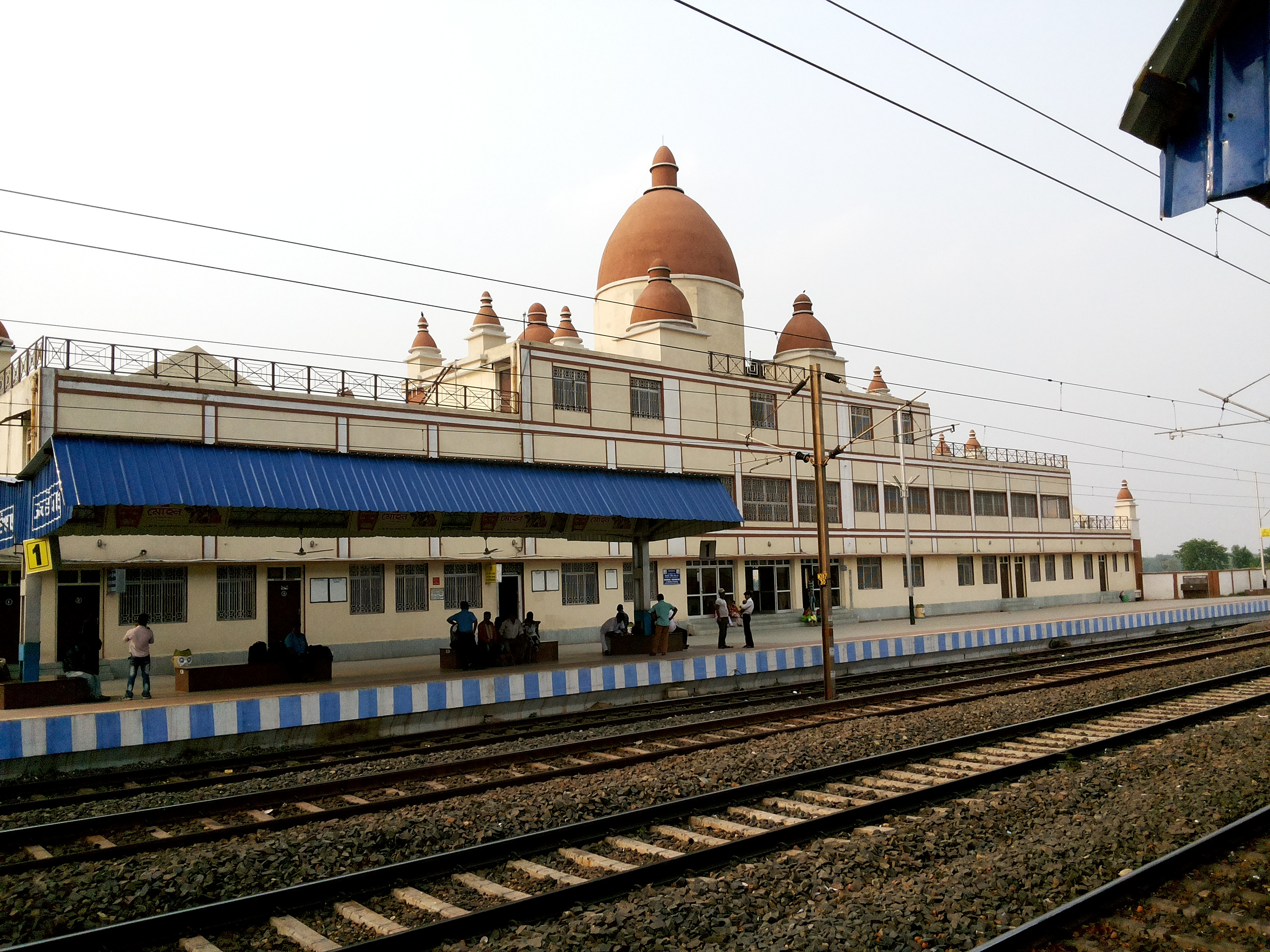
Joychandi Pahar station. The new building, inaugurated in 2013, is modelled on the Cooch Behar Palace.

In 201314, the Raghunathpur I CD block had 8 originating/terminating bus routes.

State Highway 8 running from Santaldih (in the Purulia district) to Majhdia (in the Nadia district) and State Highway 5 running from Rupnarayanpur (in the Paschim Bardhaman district) to Junput (in the Purba Medinipur district) cross at Raghunathpur.

The Asansol-Adra line of the South Eastern Railway passes through this block and there is a station at Joychandi Pahar.

== Education ==
In 2013–14, the Raghunathpur I CD block had 105 primary schools with 7,971 students, 19 middle schools with 1,319 students, five high schools with 2,642 students and six higher secondary schools with 6,592 students. Raghunathpur I CD Block had one professional/technical institute with 96 students and 226 institutions with 8,129 students for special and non-formal education. Raghunathpur (municipal town, outside the CD Block) had one general college with 3,140 students.

See also – Education in India

According to the 2011 census, in Raghunathpur I CD block, amongst the 79 inhabited villages, seven villages did not have a school, 23 villages had two or more primary schools, 21 villages had at least one primary and one middle school and 12 villages had at least one middle and one secondary school.

== Healthcare ==
In 2014, the Raghunathpur I CD block had one block primary health centre and two primary health centres, with total 31 beds and 3 doctors. 1,913 patients were treated indoor and 152,413 patients were treated outdoor in the health centres and subcentres of the CD Block.

There are primary health centres in the Raghunathpur I CD block at Babudergram (PO Sanko) (with six beds) and Biltora (PO Gadibera) (with four beds).
