= Pandri, Purulia district =

Pandri is a small village situated in the Purulia district in the state of West Bengal, known for being the first decentralized solar-powered village in India.

== Geography ==
Pandri is situated in the foothills of the Ajodhya Hills in the district Purulia. The village is located about eighteen kilometers from Jhalda. The village has about eighty households which are basically mud huts in three clusters. The approach to the village is a dirt road that winds through hilly terrain. The source of water supply to Pandri village is a dam situated close to the village.

== First solar-powered village in India ==
Pandri is the first decentralized solar-powered village in India. An initiative by Sri Sri Ravi Shankar's Art of Living Foundation which is a non-profit organization and by the Sri Sri Rural Development Program in West Bengal, set up the solar plant at a cost of about 4,500,000 Indian rupees. Pandri was chosen for this project as it had all year water supply due to its proximity to a dam situated near the village. Logistically, it was hard to set up the solar power plant due to bad roads and the steep climb for the supply trucks to reach Pandri. The other issue in setting up the solar plant was that labor (which included masons) and electricians initially refused to work in the area and around the village, as it was an area affected by Maoists. Covering about 2,000 square feet with about 75 solar panels, the solar power project was completed in 2015, generating about 1.2 kilowatts per panel of solar-power supplying clean energy to about 80 households.
