= Raghunathpur II =

- Community development block
- Location in West Bengal
- Coordinates: 23°36′14″N 86°32′57″E
- Country: India
- State: West Bengal
- District: Purulia
- Parliamentary constituency: Purulia
- Assembly constituency: Para

Area
  - Total: 197.67 km^{2} (76.32 sq mi)
- Elevation: 156 m (512 ft)

Population (2011)
  - Total: 113,790
  - Density: 575.66/km^{2} (1,490.9/sq mi)
- Time zone: UTC+5.30 (IST)
- Telephone/STD code: 03251
- Vehicle registration: WB-55, WB-56
- Literacy Rate: 67.29 per cent
- Website: http://raghunathpur2block.in

Raghunathpur II is a community development block (CD block) that forms an administrative division in the Raghunathpur subdivision of the Purulia district in the Indian state of West Bengal.

== History ==
=== Background ===
The Jaina Bhagavati-Sutra of the 5th century AD mentions that Purulia was one of the sixteen mahajanapadas and was a part of the kingdom known as Vajra-bhumi in ancient times. In 1833, the Manbhum district was carved out of the Jungle Mahals district, with headquarters at Manbazar. In 1838, the headquarters was transferred to Purulia. After independence, when Manbhum district was a part of Bihar, efforts were made to impose Hindi on the Bengali-speaking majority of the district and it led to the Bengali Language Movement (Manbhum). In 1956, the Manbhum district was partitioned between Bihar and West Bengal under the States Reorganization Act and the Bihar and West Bengal (Transfer of Territories) Act 1956.

== Geography ==
CD blocks in Purulia district

Cheliyama is located at 23°36′14″N 86°32′57″E.

The Raghunathpur II CD block is located in the north-western part of the district. The Damodar River marks the northern boundary of the CD block. The Damodar Dwaraka upland is an extension of the Chota Nagpur Plateau. The area is undulating with hillocks of hard rocks.

The Raghunathpur II CD block is bounded by the Jharia area of the Dhanbad Municipal Corporation and the Baliapur CD block, in Dhanbad district of Jharkhand, both across the Damodar River, on the north, the Neturia and Raghunathpur I CD blocks on the east, the Para CD block on the south and the Chandankiyari CD block, in the Bokaro district of Jharkhand, on the west.

The Raghunathpur II CD block has an area of 197.67 km^{2}. It has one panchayat samity, six gram panchayats, 80 gram sansads (village councils), 106 mouzas, 90 inhabited villages and one census town. Santaldih police station serves this block. Headquarters of this CD block is at Cheliyama (Cheyama).

Gram panchayats of the Raghunathpur II block/panchayat samiti are: Barrah, Chelyama, Joradih, Mangalda-Moutore, Nildih and Nutandih.

== Demographics ==
=== Population ===
According to the 2011 Census of India, the Raghunathpur II CD block had a total population of 113,790, of which 107,827 were rural and 5,963 were urban. There were 58,568 (51%) males and 55,222 (49%) females. There were 15,806 persons in the age range of 0 to 6 years. The Scheduled Castes numbered 41,460 (36.44%) and the Scheduled Tribes numbered 7,302 (6.42%).

According to the 2001 census, the Raghunathpur II block had a total population of 99,152, out of which 50,929 were males and 48,223 were females. The Raghunathpur II CD block registered a population growth of 15.94 per cent during the 1991–2001 decade. Decadal growth for the Purulia district was 13.96 per cent. Decadal growth in West Bengal was 17.84 per cent.

Census towns in the Raghunathpur II CD block are (2011 census figures in brackets): Nabagram (5,963).

Large villages (with 4,000+ population) in the Raghunathpur II CD block are (2011 census figures in brackets): Ichhar (6,494) and Cheyama (7,413).

Other villages in the Raghunathpur II CD block are (2011 census figures in brackets): Nutandi (3,275), Telkupi (510), Mangalda (3,187), Usir (2,430), Nildi (838) and Barra (3,302).

=== Literacy ===
According to the 2011 census, the total number of literate persons in the Raghunathpur II CD block was 65,936 (67.29% of the population over 6 years) out of which males numbered 40,847 (80.95% of the male population over 6 years) and females numbered 25,089 (52.79%) of the female population over 6 years). The gender disparity (the difference between female and male literacy rates) was 28.16%.

See also – List of West Bengal districts ranked by literacy rate

Literacy in CD blocks of
Purulia district
Purulia Sadar subdivision
Arsha – 57.48%
Balarampur – 60.40%
Hura – 68.79%
Purulia I – 78.37%
Purulia II – 63.39%
Manbazar subdivision
Barabazar – 63.27
Bandwan – 61.38%
Manbazar I – 63.78%
Manbazar II – 60.27%
Puncha – 68.14%
Jhalda subdivision
Baghmundi – 57.17%
Jhalda I – 66.18%
Jhalda II – 54.76%
Joypur – 57.94%
Raghunathpur subdivision
Para – 65.62%
Raghunathpur I – 67.36%
Raghunathpur II – 67.29%
Neturia – 65.14%
Santuri – 64.15%
Kashipur – 71.06%
2011 Census: CD Block Wise

Primary Census Abstract Data

=== Language and religion ===
Religion in Raghunathpur II CD block (2011)
Hinduism	84.75%
Islam	11.18%
Other (tribal religion)	2.64%
Jainism	1.22%
Other or not stated	0.21%

In the 2011 census, Hindus numbered 96,433 and formed 84.75% of the population in the Raghunathpur II CD block. Muslims numbered 12,720 and formed 11.18% of the population. Jains are 1,386 and formed 1.22% of the population. Others numbered 3,241 and formed 2.85% of the population. Others include Addi Bassi, Marang Boro, Santal, Saranath, Sari Dharma, Sarna, Alchchi, Bidin, Sant, Saevdharm, Seran, Saran, Sarin, Kheria, and other religious communities. In 2001, Hindus were 89.16%, Muslims 9.93% and Jains 0.51% of the population respectively.

Languages of Raghunathpur II CD block (2011)
1. Bengali (92.9%)
2. Santali (4.28%)
3. Hindi (1.24%)
4. Others (1.56%)

At the time of the 2011 census, 92.92% of the population spoke Bengali, 4.28% Santali and 1.24% Hindi as their first language.

== Rural Poverty ==
According to the Rural Household Survey in 2005, 32.85% of total number of families were BPL families in Purulia district. According to a World Bank report, as of 2012, 31–38% of the population in Purulia, Murshidabad and Uttar Dinajpur districts were below poverty level, the highest among the districts of West Bengal, which had an average 20% of the population below poverty line.

== Economy ==
=== Livelihood ===
Livelihood
in Raghunathpur II CD block
1. Cultivators 13.89 (13.1%)
2. Agricultural labourers 30.07 (28.3%)
3. Household industries 3.12 (2.94%)
4. Other Workers 59.14 (55.7%)

In the Raghunathpur II CD block in 2011, among the class of total workers, cultivators numbered 5,709 and formed 13.89%, agricultural labourers numbered 12,361 and formed 30.37%, household industry workers numbered 1,284 and formed 3.12% and other workers numbered 21,760 and formed 59.14%. Total workers numbered 41,114 and formed 36.13% of the total population, and non-workers numbered 72,676 and formed 63.87% of the population.

Note: In the census records a person is considered a cultivator, if the person is engaged in cultivation/ supervision of land owned by self/government/institution. When a person who works on another person's land for wages in cash or kind or share, is regarded as an agricultural labourer. Household industry is defined as an industry conducted by one or more members of the family within the household or village, and one that does not qualify for registration as a factory under the Factories Act. Other workers are persons engaged in some economic activity other than cultivators, agricultural labourers and household workers. It includes factory, mining, plantation, transport and office workers, those engaged in business and commerce, teachers, entertainment artistes and so on.

=== Infrastructure ===
There are 90 inhabited villages in the Raghunathpur II CD block, as per the District Census Handbook, Puruliya, 2011, 100% villages have power supply. 100% villages have drinking water supply. 14 villages (15.56%) have post offices. 71 villages (78.89%) have telephones (including landlines, public call offices and mobile phones). 29 villages (32.22%) have pucca (paved) approach roads and 39 villages (43.33%) have transport communication (includes bus service, rail facility and navigable waterways). four villages (4.44%) have agricultural credit societies and three villages (3.33%) have banks.

=== Industry ===
Santaldih Thermal Power Station of the West Bengal Power Development Corporation has a total capacity of 980 MW (4x120, 2x250).

Ispat Damodar of the Eurasia group producing sponge iron, mild steel billets and ferro alloys have their manufacturing facilities at Nabagram.

=== Agriculture ===
In 2013–14, persons engaged in agriculture in the Raghunathpur II CD block could be classified as follows: bargadars 12.35%, patta (document) holders 13.45%, small farmers (possessing land between one and two hectares) 2.98%, marginal farmers (possessing land up to one hectare) 23.68% and agricultural labourers 47.54%.

In 2013–14, the total area irrigated in the Raghunathpur II CD block was 4,087.13 hectares, out of which 1,547.00 hectares were by canals, 1,303.94 hectares by tank water, 18.89 hectares by river lift irrigation, 225.60 hectares by open dug wells and 991.70 hectares by other means.

In 2013–14, the Raghunathpur II CD block produced 16,218 tonnes of Aman paddy, the main winter crop from 6,901 hectares. It also produced wheat, maize, maskalai and mustard.

=== Banking ===
In 2013–14, the Raghunathpur II CD block had offices of four commercial banks and five gramin banks.

=== Backward Regions Grant Fund ===
The Purulia district is listed as a backward region and receives financial support from the Backward Regions Grant Fund. The fund, created by the Government of India, is designed to redress regional imbalances in development. As of 2012, 272 districts across the country were listed under this scheme. The list includes 11 districts of West Bengal.

== Transport ==
In 2013–14, the Raghunathpur II CD block had two ferry services and five originating/terminating bus routes.

== Education ==
In 2013–14, the Raghunathpur II CD block had 99 primary schools with 9,098 students, nine middle schools with 1,115 students, four high schools with 2,084 students and nine higher secondary schools with 6,330 students. Raghunathpur II CD Block had one general college with 719 students and 261 institutions with 7,583 students for special and non-formal education. Raghunathpur (municipal town, outside the CD Block) had one general college with 3,140 students.

According to the 2011 census, in Raghunathpur II CD block, amongst the 90 inhabited villages, nine villages did not have a school, 17 villages had two or more primary schools, 18 villages had at least one primary and one middle school and eight villages had at least one middle and one secondary school.

Santaldih College was established in 2008 at Usir, PO Chatarmahul.

== Healthcare ==
In 2014, the Raghunathpur II CD block had one block primary health centre and two primary health centres, with total 44 beds and five doctors. 7,344 patients were treated indoors and 116,687 patients were treated outdoors in the health centres and subcentres of the CD Block.

Banda (Cheliyama) Rural Hospital, with 30 beds at Cheliyama, is the major government medical facility in the Raghunathpur II CD block. There are primary health centres at Bogra (with 10 beds) and Nildih (with four beds). Santaldih Thermal Hospital at Santaldih functions with 10 beds.
