= Mabinul Haq =

Indian writer from West Bengal

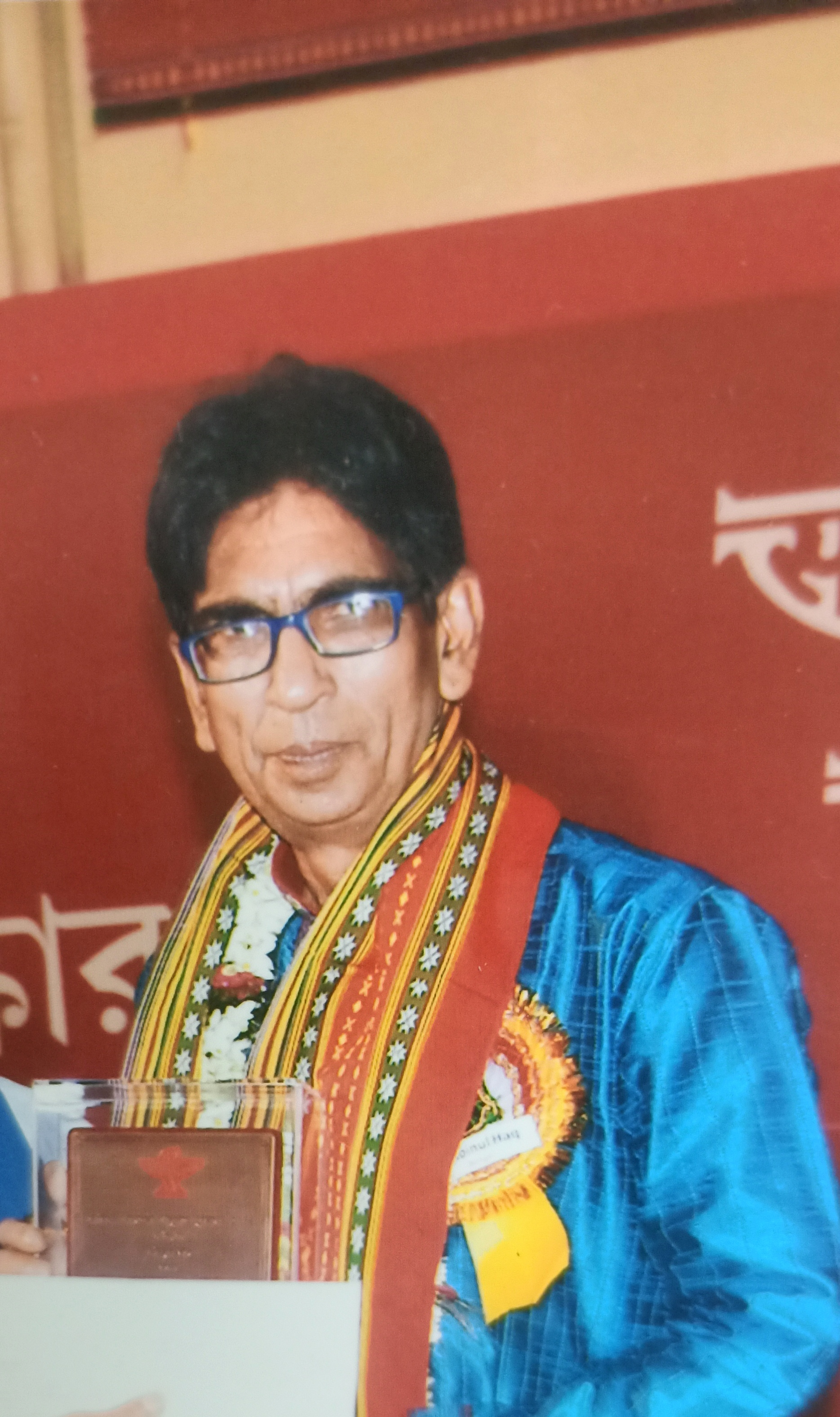
- Born: 1956 month..... Day...... Purulia, West Bengal, India
- Occupation: Writer
- Awards: Sahitya Akademi Award for Bengali Translation (2018)

Mabinul Haq is an Indian writer from West Bengal who won the Sahitya Akademi Translation Prize in 2018.

== Biography ==
Though Haq was born and raised in Purulia. He lives in Murshidabad. He translates books into Bangla. He translated Saadat Hasan Manto's works into Bangla titled Thanda Gosto O Anyanyo Galpo and Atish Pare. He also translated Ismat Chughtai's writings into Bangla titled Lep O Anyanyo Galpo and Sajjad Zaheer's writings into Bangla titled Angaaray. Besides, he translated Urdu short stories of Pakistan into Bangla titled Pakistaner Urdu Golpo.

== Publications ==
- Thanda Gosto O Anyanyo Galpo
- Atish Pare
- Lep O Anyanyo Galpo
- Angaaray
- Pakistaner Urdu Golpo

== Awards and recognition ==
Haq translated Ismat Chughtai's Lihaaf and other Stories from Urdu into Bangla titled Lep O Anyanyo Galpo. For this work he was awarded Sahitya Akademi Award for Bangla Translation in 2018.
