= Usir =

- Village
- Location in West Bengal, India Usir (India)
- Coordinates: 23.6125°N 86.5236°E
- Country: India
- State: West Bengal
- District: Purulia

Population (2011)
  - Total: 2,430

Languages
  - Official: Bengali, English
- Time zone: UTC+5:30 (IST)
- PIN: 723145 (Chatarmahul)
- Telephone/STD code: 03251
- Lok Sabha constituency: Purulia
- Vidhan Sabha constituency: Para
- Website: purulia.gov.in

Usir is a village in the Raghunathpur II CD block in the Raghunathpur subdivision of the Purulia district in the state of West Bengal, India.

== Geography ==
Places in Raghunathpur subdivision in Purulia district
M: municipal town, CT: census town, R: rural/ urban centre, H: historical/ religious centre, T: tourist centre
Owing to space constraints in the small map, the actual locations in a larger map may vary slightly

=== Location ===
Usir is located at 23.6125°N 86.5236°E.

=== Area overview ===
Purulia district forms the lowest step of the Chota Nagpur Plateau. The general scenario is undulating land with scattered hills. Raghunathpur subdivision occupies the northern part of the district. 83.80% of the population of the subdivision lives in rural areas. However, there are pockets of urbanization and 16.20% of the population lives in urban areas. There are 14 census towns in the subdivision. It is presented in the map given alongside. There is a coal mining area around Parbelia and two thermal power plants are there – the 500 MW Santaldih Thermal Power Station and the 1200 MW Raghunathpur Thermal Power Station. The subdivision has a rich heritage of old temples, some of them belonging to the 11th century or earlier. The Banda Deul is a monument of national importance. The comparatively more recent in historical terms, Panchkot Raj has interesting and intriguing remains in the area.

Note: The map alongside presents some of the notable locations in the subdivision. All places marked in the map are linked in the larger full screen map.

== Demographics ==
According to the 2011 Census of India, Usir had a total population of 2,430, of which 1,222 (50%) were males and 1,208 (50%) were females. There were 353 persons in the age range of 0–6 years. The total number of literate persons in Usir was 1,193 (57.44% of the population over 6 years).

== Education ==
Santaldih College was established in 2008 at Usir, PO Chatarmahul. Affiliated with the Sidho Kanho Birsha University, it offers honours courses in Bengali, English, Sanskrit, history, political science and a general course in arts.

Ushir Junior High School is a Bengali-medium coeducational institution established in 2009. It has facilities for teaching from class V to class VIII.

== Culture ==
Banda Deul, located nearby, an 11th-century temple, is a monument of national importance.

== Healthcare ==
Banda (Cheliyama) Rural Hospital, with 30 beds at Cheliyama, is the major government medical facility in the Raghunathpur II CD block.
