= Jai Balaji group =

Indian steel company

- Type: Public Limited
- Industry: Steel
- Founded: 1999
- Headquarters: Kolkata, India
- Key people: Aditya Jajodia
- Products: Pig Iron; Ferro Alloys; Reinforcement Steel TMT and CRS Bars; Carbon, Alloy and Mild Steel Billets and Rounds; Wire Rods; Ductile Iron Pipes; Grinding Media Rods and Collector Bars
- Revenue: Rs. 25 billion
- Website: jaibalajigroup.com

Jai Balaji Group is a steel manufacturer with captive power generation and plants in nine locations. It also has plans to set up a steel, cement, and power project at Raghunathpur. The group has a presence at Raniganj, Liluah and Rourkela. In 2011, the company bought Nilachal Iron & Power, which is based in Saraikela.
