= Raghunathpur, Purulia =

Raghunathpur
- Town
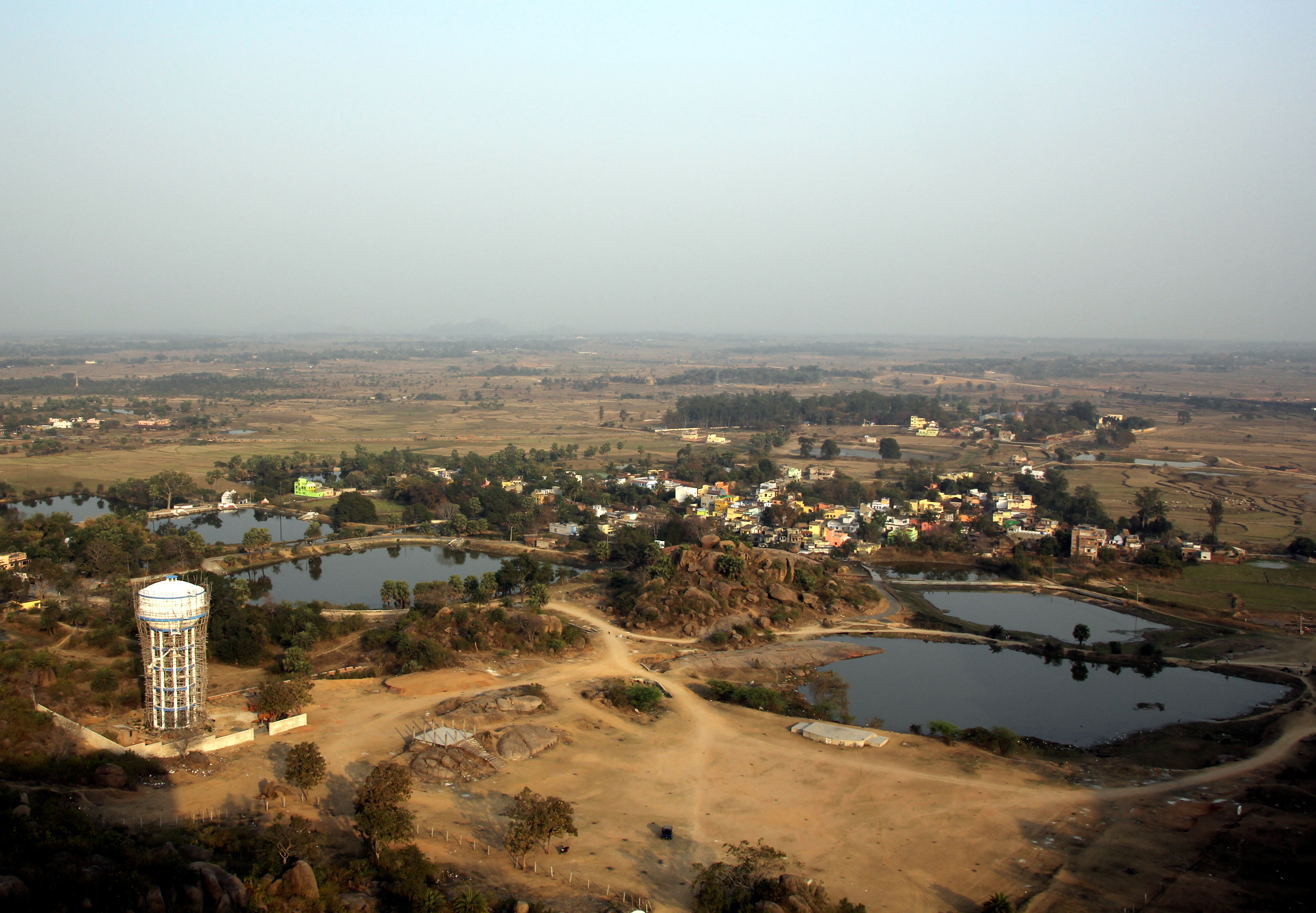

- Location in West Bengal, India Raghunathpur (India)
- Coordinates: 23.55°N 86.67°E
- Country: India
- State: West Bengal
- District: Purulia

Government
  - Type: Municipality
  - Body: Raghunathpur Municipality

Area
  - Total: 12.95 km^{2} (5.00 sq mi)
- Elevation: 155 m (509 ft)

Population (2011)
  - Total: 25,932
  - Density: 2,002/km^{2} (5,186/sq mi)

Languages
  - Official: Bengali, English
- Time zone: UTC+5:30 (IST)
- PIN: 723 133
- Telephone code: 91 3251
- Lok Sabha constituency: Bankura
- Vidhan Sabha constituency: Raghunathpur, Para
- Website: purulia.gov.in

Raghunathpur is a city and a municipality in Purulia district in the state of West Bengal, India. It is the headquarters of the Raghunathpur subdivision. Industrial City Raghunathpur is located near Adra on the North-East part of Purulia district. It is connected with other cities through five main way road's, which are Purulia – Barakar road, Raghunathpur-Adra-Hura road, Raghunathpur-Chas road, Cheliyama road and Raghunathpur-Bankura road. The nearest main junction stations are Joychandi Pahar railway station and Adra Junction railway station.

== History ==
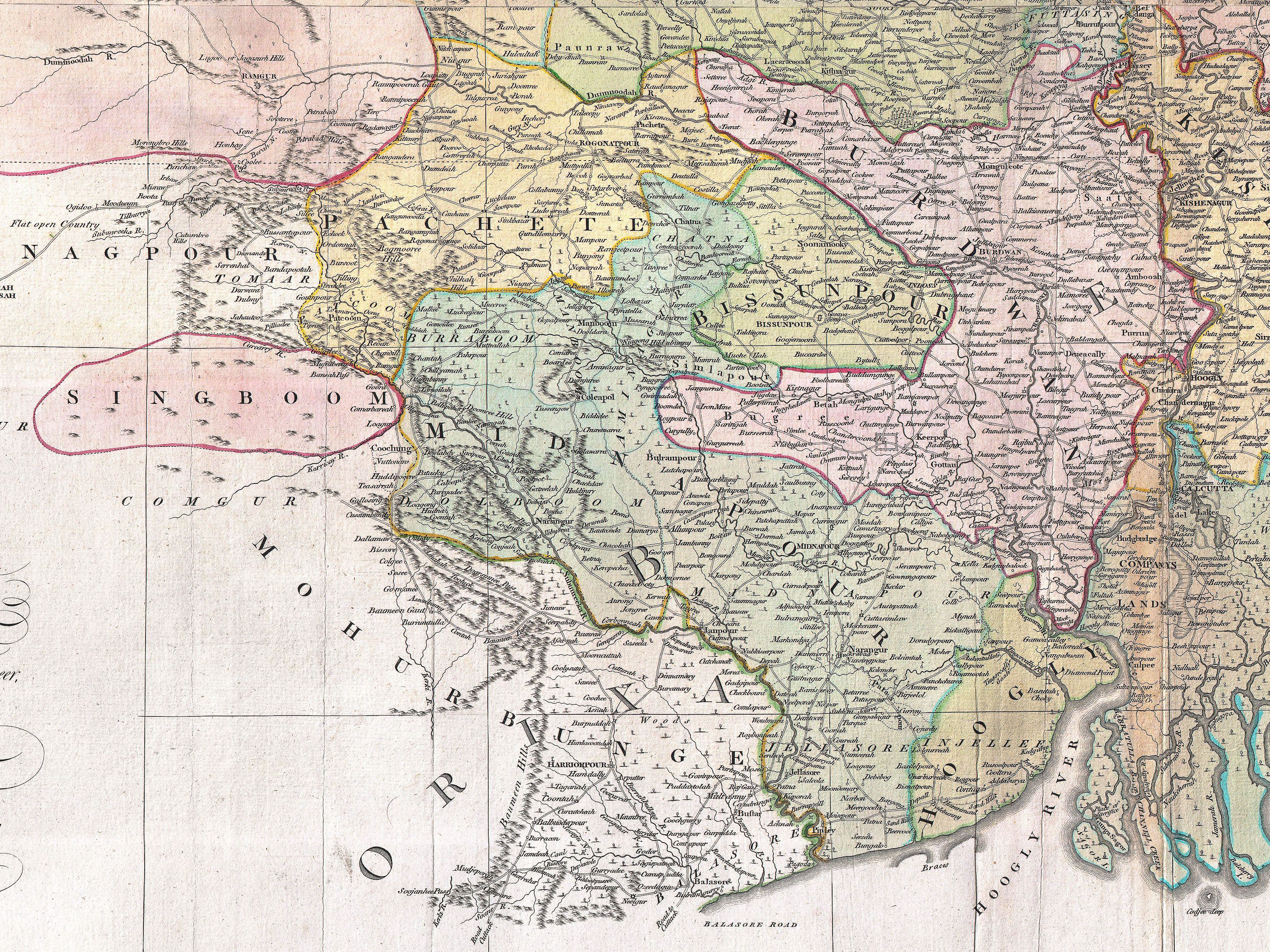
Raghunathpur in Panchet administration on James Rennell's Mid-18th Century map.

== Geography ==
Places in Raghunathpur subdivision in Purulia district
M: municipal town, CT: census town, R: rural/ urban centre, H: historical/ religious centre, T: tourist centre
Owing to space constraints in the small map, the actual locations in a larger map may vary slightly

=== Location ===
Raghunathpur is located at 23.55°N 86.67°E. It has an average elevation of 155 m (509 ft). The area forms the lowest step of the Chota Nagpur Plateau. The general scenario is undulating land with scattered hills.

=== Area overview ===
Purulia district forms the lowest step of the Chota Nagpur Plateau. The general scenario is undulating land with scattered hills. Raghunathpur subdivision occupies the northern part of the district. 83.80% of the population of the subdivision lives in rural areas. However, there are pockets of urbanization and 16.20% of the population lives in urban areas. There are 14 census towns in the subdivision. It is presented in the map given alongside. There is a coal mining area around Parbelia and two thermal power plants are there – the 500 MW Santaldih Thermal Power Station and the 1200 MW Raghunathpur Thermal Power Station. The subdivision has a rich heritage of old temples, some of them belonging to the 11th century or earlier. The Banda Deul is a monument of national importance. The comparatively more recent in historical terms, Panchkot Raj has interesting and intriguing remains in the area.

Note: The map alongside presents some of the notable locations in the subdivision. All places marked in the map are linked in the larger full screen map.

== Civic administration ==
=== Police stations ===
Raghunathpur police station has jurisdiction over Raghunathpur municipality and parts of the Raghunathpur I CD block. The area covered is 337 km^{2} and the population covered is 197,430.

Raghunathpur Women police station. It will cover all the police stations areas of Raghunathpur subdivision.

Adra Police station has jurisdiction over some parts of Arrah and Sanka areas.

=== CD block HQ ===
The headquarters of the Raghunathpur I CD block are located at Raghunathpur.

=== Administration ===
Raghunathpur town area falls under Raghunathpur Municipality.

Some parts of Raghunathpur are in intermediate panchayat in Purulia district, with Arrah, Babugram, Bero, Choprahari, Khajura, Nutandi, Sanka, Barrah, Cheliama, Jotadih, Mangaldah-Mautore, Nildih, and Nutandih village panchayats under it.

== Demographics ==
Raghunathpur total area covers 12.95 km^{2} and at present 13 nos of Ward. Raghunathpur had a total population of 25,932 in 2011. Out of this 11,326 were males and 10,486 were females. 2,640 persons were below the age of 6 years. 13,317 persons were literate.

== Economy ==
Damodar Valley Corporation has planned for a power plant at Raghunathpur as a proposed greenfield plant in the 11th plan. The first stage would be 2 X 600 MW.

Representatives of the Jai Balaji group visited the Raghunathpur on 11 January 2007 to see the sites for their proposed steel, cement and power plants.

A steel plant of 5 million tons capacity along with a cement plant with capacity of 3000,000 tons will be set up at block one in Raghunathpur. The Jai Balaji group will be setting up these projects worth Rs 16,000 crore with a captive power plant on 3,800 acres (15 km^{2}) of land. Adhunik group will set up an 1,100,000 ton capacity steel plant along with a 1000,000 ton cement plant. The project covering an area of nearly 2,400 acres (9.7 km^{2}) will also comprise a captive power plant involving an investment of Rs 6400 crore. The state cabinet approved the industrial projects on 22 August 2007.

The state government has acquired 1,100 acres (4.5 km^{2}) of land against the requirement of 3,300 acres (13 km^{2}). The land acquired was handed over to Jai Balaji group in October 2009. The state government was acquiring the balance portion of the land, In the first phase the Jai Balaji group will begin with coal mining at Asansol and sponge iron production at Raghunathpur. The company expects to start production in 2011.

== Education ==
Raghunathpur College was established in 1961. Affiliated with the Sidho Kanho Birsha University, it offers honours courses in Bengali, Sanskrit, English, economic, geography, history, political science, sociology, accountancy, physics, chemistry, mathematics, botany, zoology and general courses in arts, science and commerce.

Raghunathpur has a number of Educational Institutions. They are

- Raghunathpur Gobinda Das Lang Institution
- Raghunathpur Girls High School
- Raghunathpur High School
- Gogra High school
- Babugram high School
- Sankra High School
- Raghunathpur Municipal Managed High School

== Gallery ==
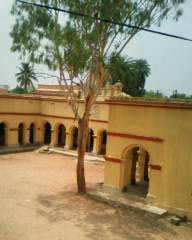
G.D.Lang Institution

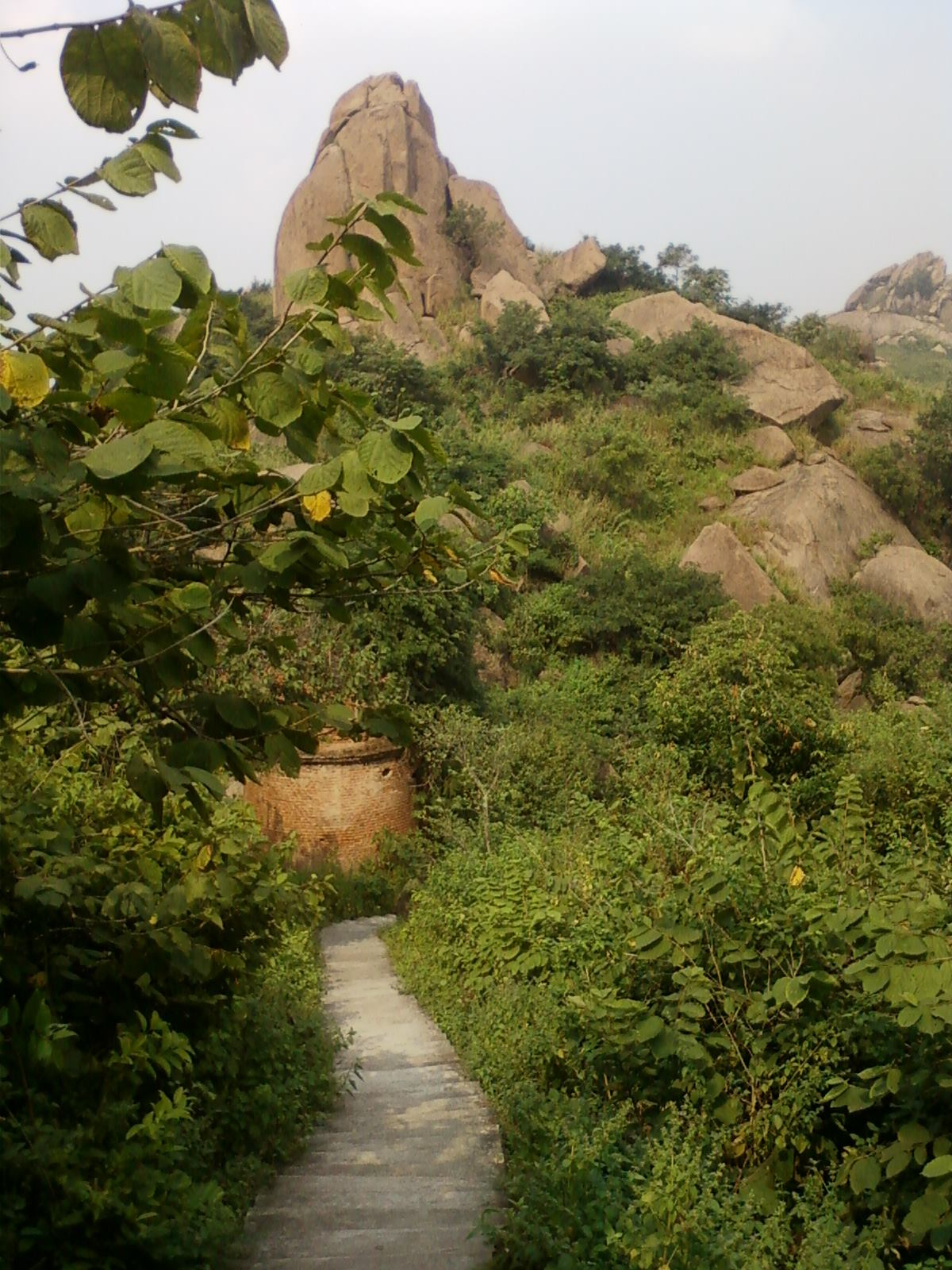
Joychandi pahar

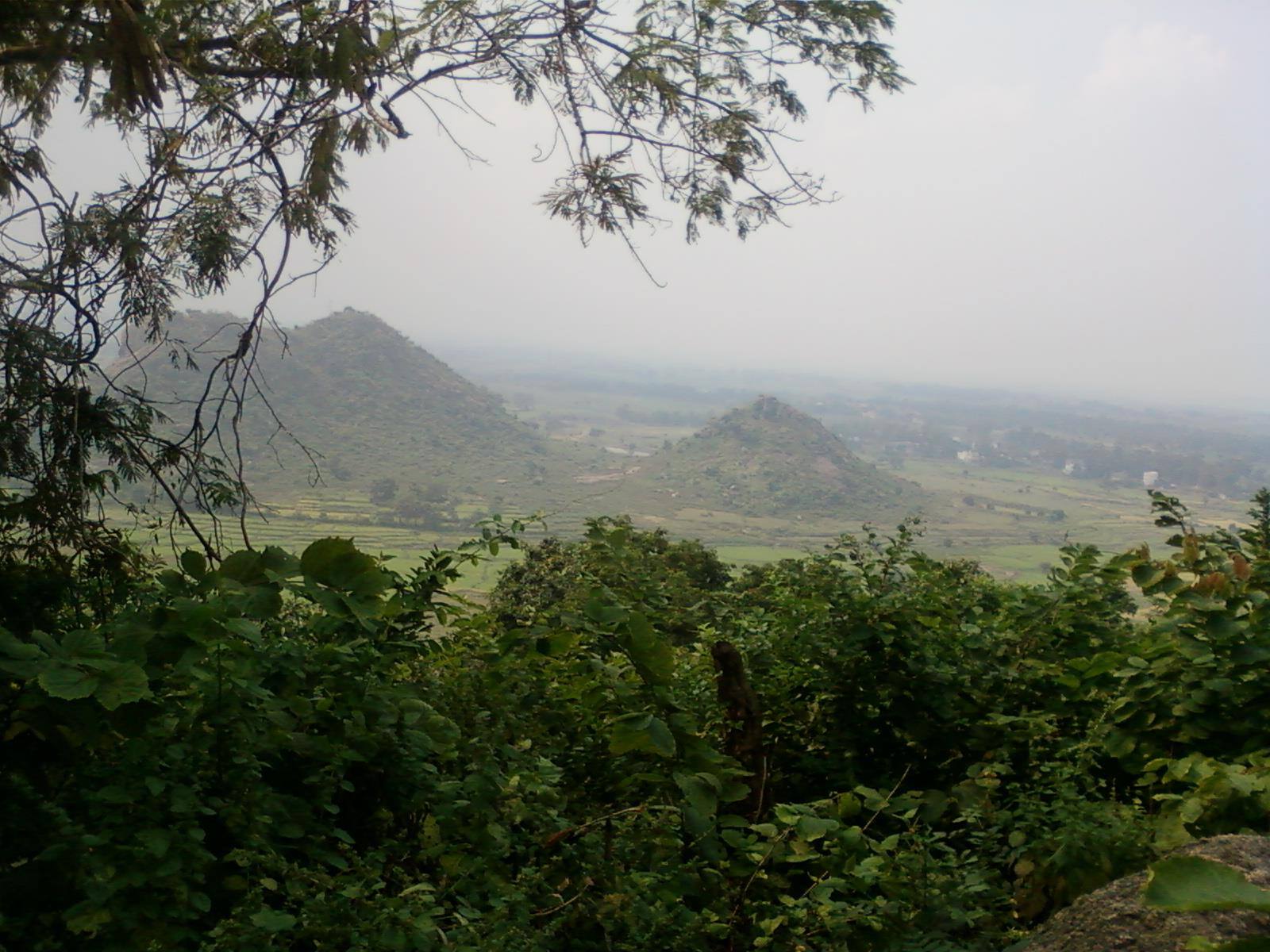
Joychandi pahar
