= Purulia district =

District in West Bengal, India

- District of West Bengal
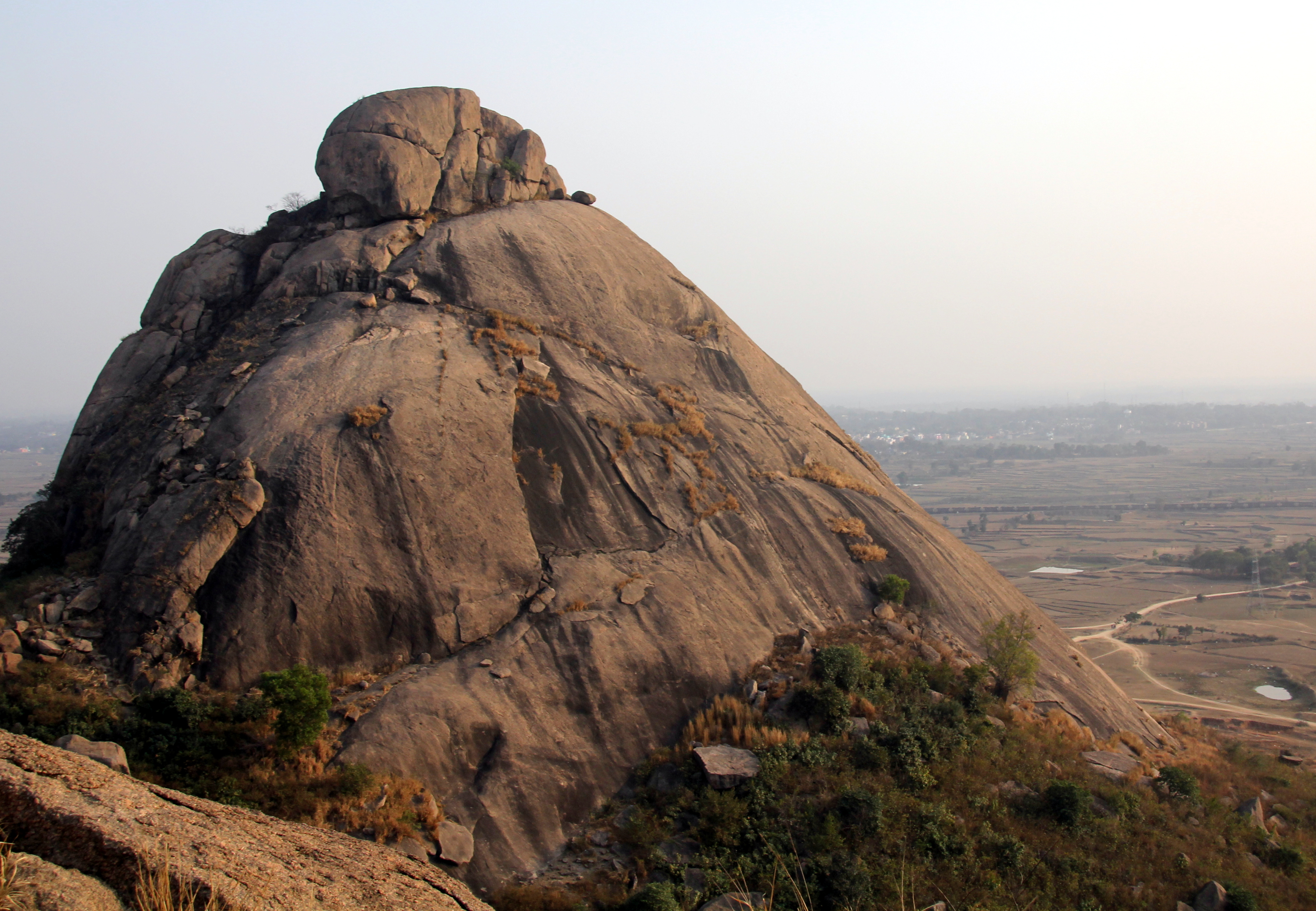
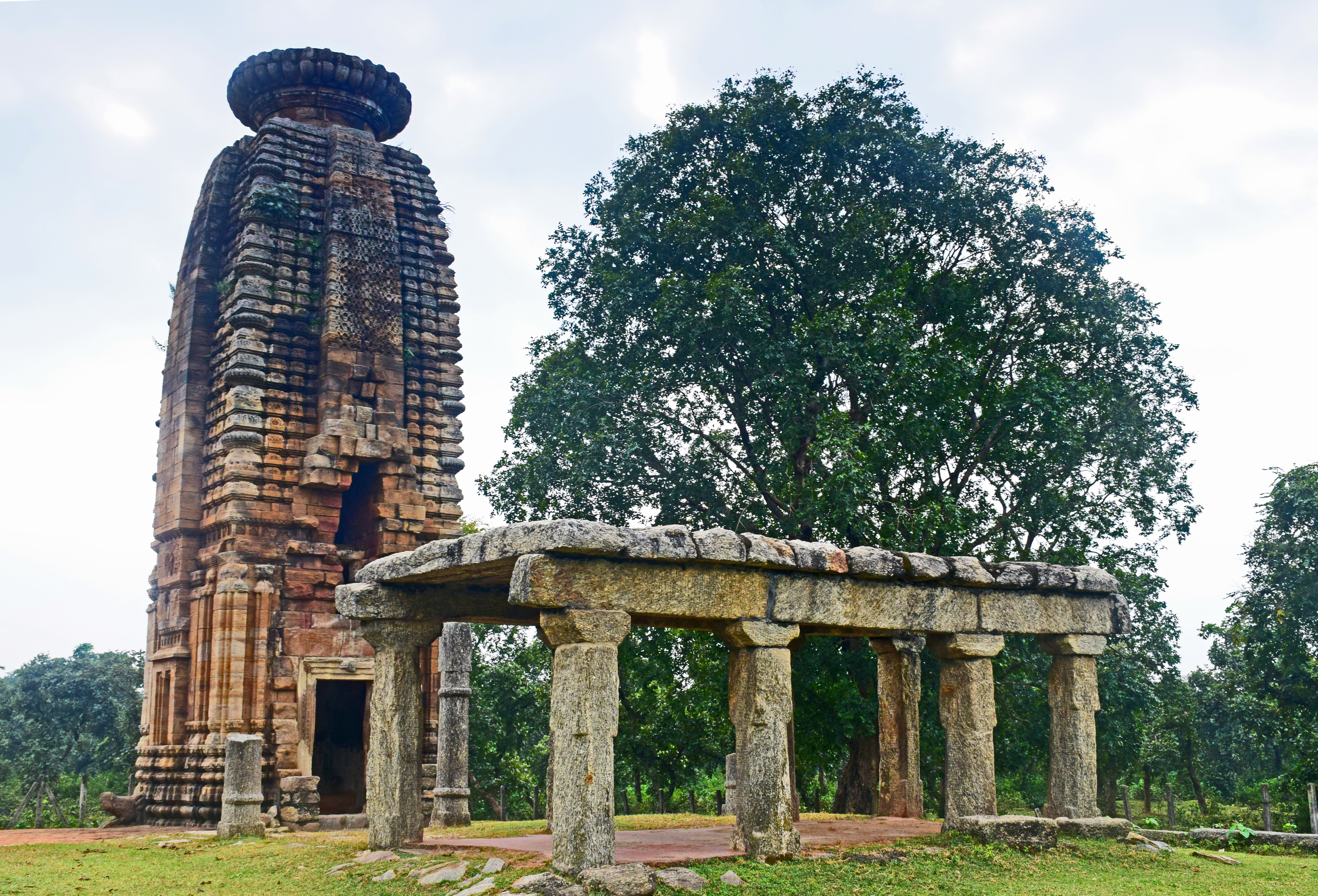
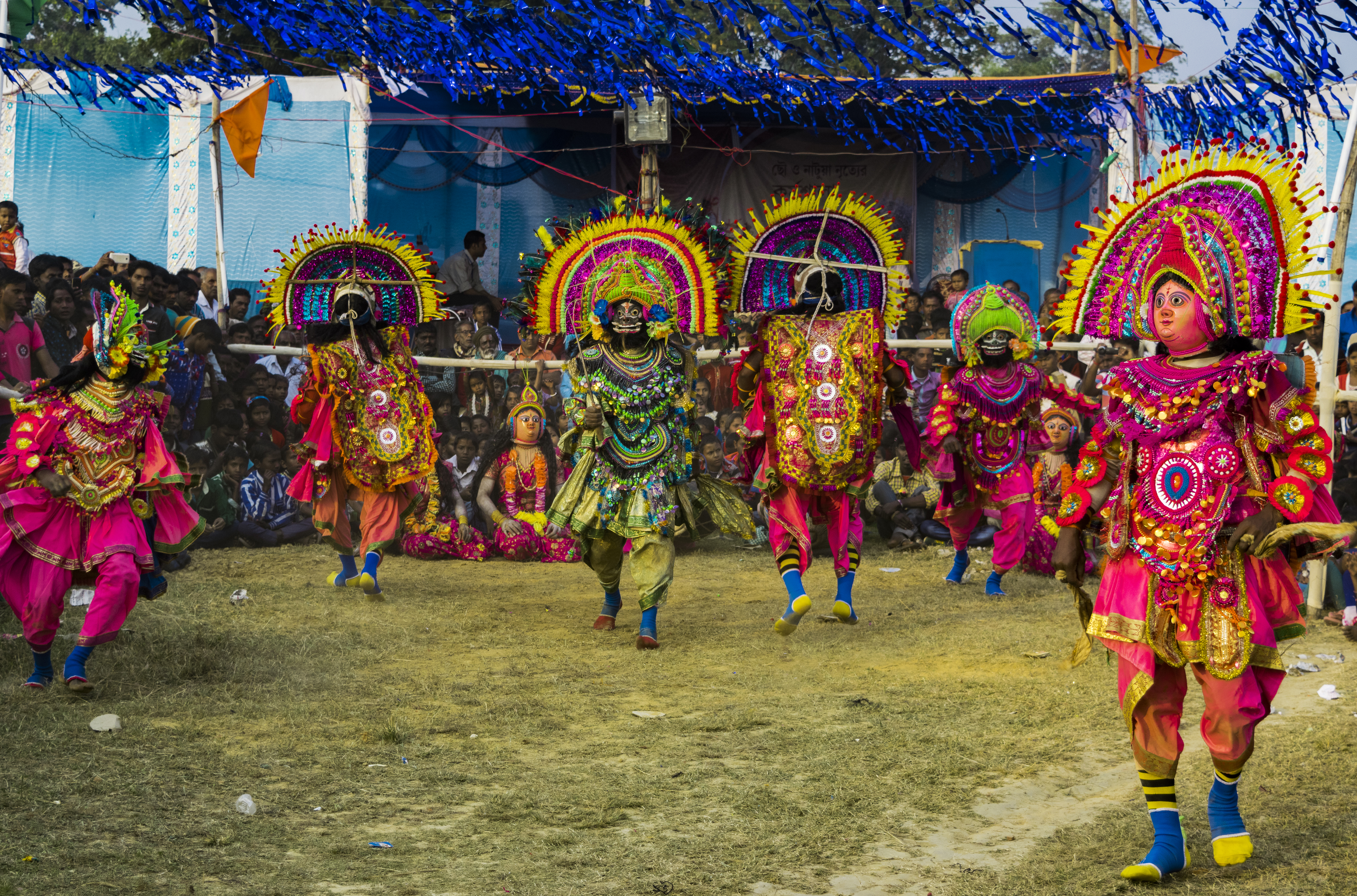
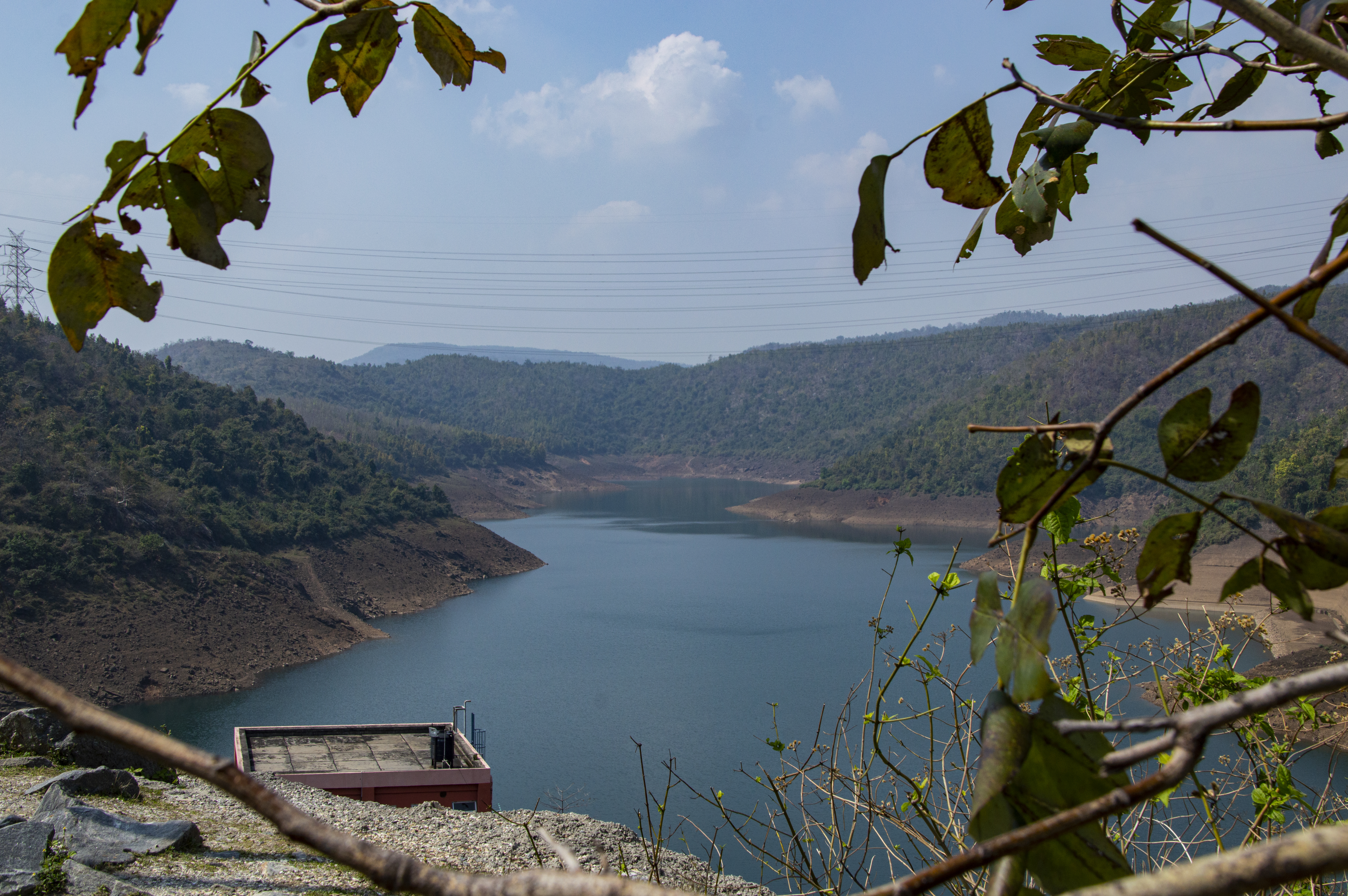
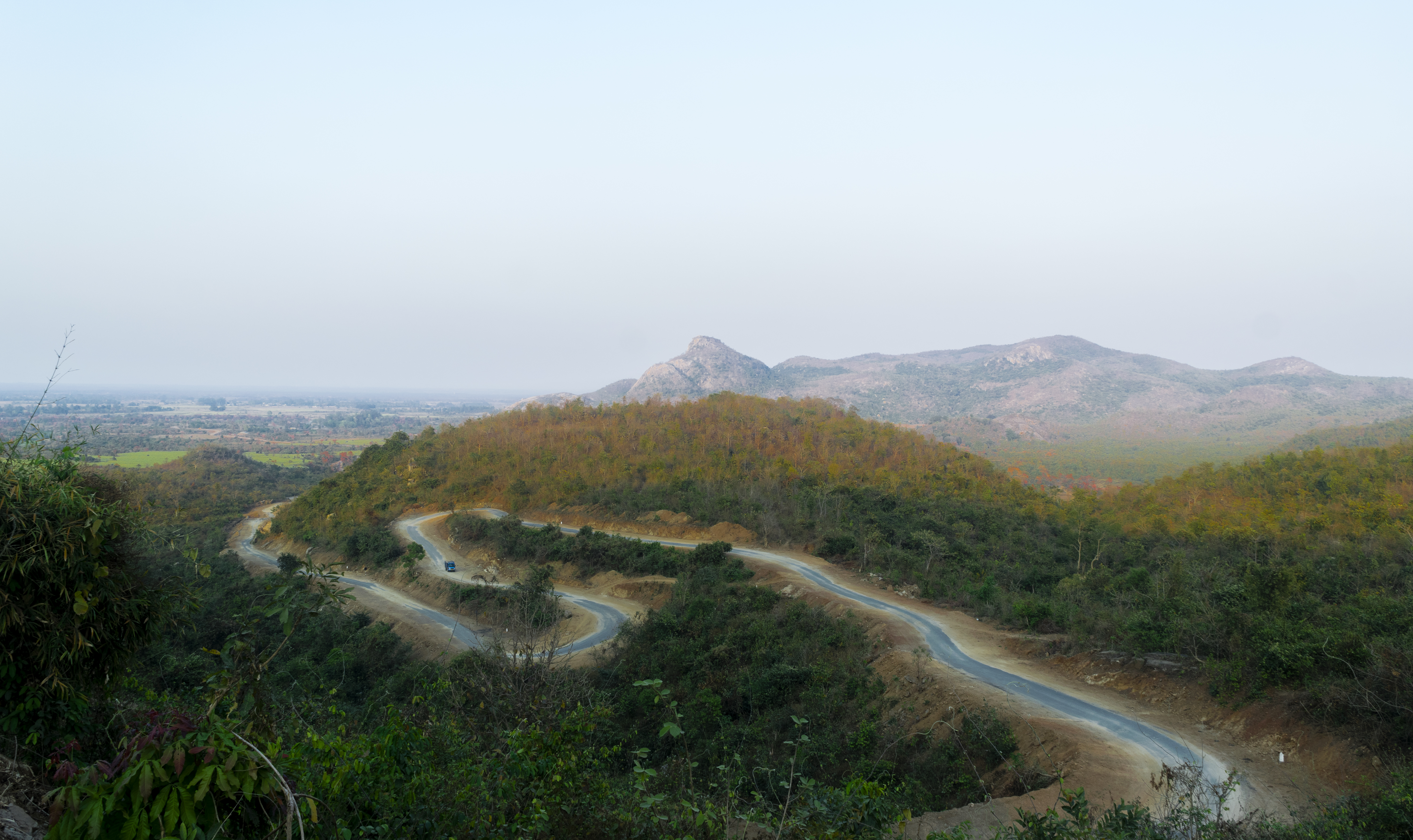
- Clockwise from top-left: Joychandi Pahar, Banda Deul temple, Ajodhya Hills, Winding hill-road, Chhau dance

- Location of Purulia district in West Bengal
- Coordinates: 23°20′N 86°22′E
- Country: India
- State: West Bengal
- Division: Medinipur
- Established: 1 November 1956
- Named for: Purulia town
- Headquarters: Purulia
- District subdivisions: Puruliya Sadar; Manbazar; Jhalda; Raghunathpur

Government
  - District Magistrate: Kontham Sudhir, IAS
  - Superintendent of Police: Vaibhab Tewari, IPS

Area
  - Total: 6,259 km^{2} (2,417 sq mi)

Population (2011)
  - Total: 2,930,115
  - Density: 468.1/km^{2} (1,212/sq mi)

Demographics
  - Sex ratio: 955 ♂/1000 ♀
  - Literacy rate: 75.48%
  - Scheduled Castes: 19.38% (567,767)
  - Scheduled Tribes: 18.45% (540,652)

Languages
  - Official: Bengali
  - Additional official: English, Santali, Kudmali
- Time zone: UTC+05:30 (IST)
- Website: purulia.gov.in

Purulia district (Bengali pronunciation: [puruliːaː]) is one of the twenty-three districts of West Bengal state in Eastern India. Purulia is the administrative headquarters of the district. Some of the other important towns of Purulia district are Raghunathpur-Adra, Manbazar, Jhalda, Anara and Balarampur.

== History ==
=== Pre history ===
The territory of present Purulia district was a part of Banga, one of the 16 Mahajanapadas according to Jaina Bhagavati Sutra (c. fifth century CE) and was also a part of the country known as Vajra-bhumi in ancient period. Little is known about Purulia before the British East India Company acquired this territory by obtaining the grant of Diwani of the subahs of Bengal, Bihar, Odisha in 1765.

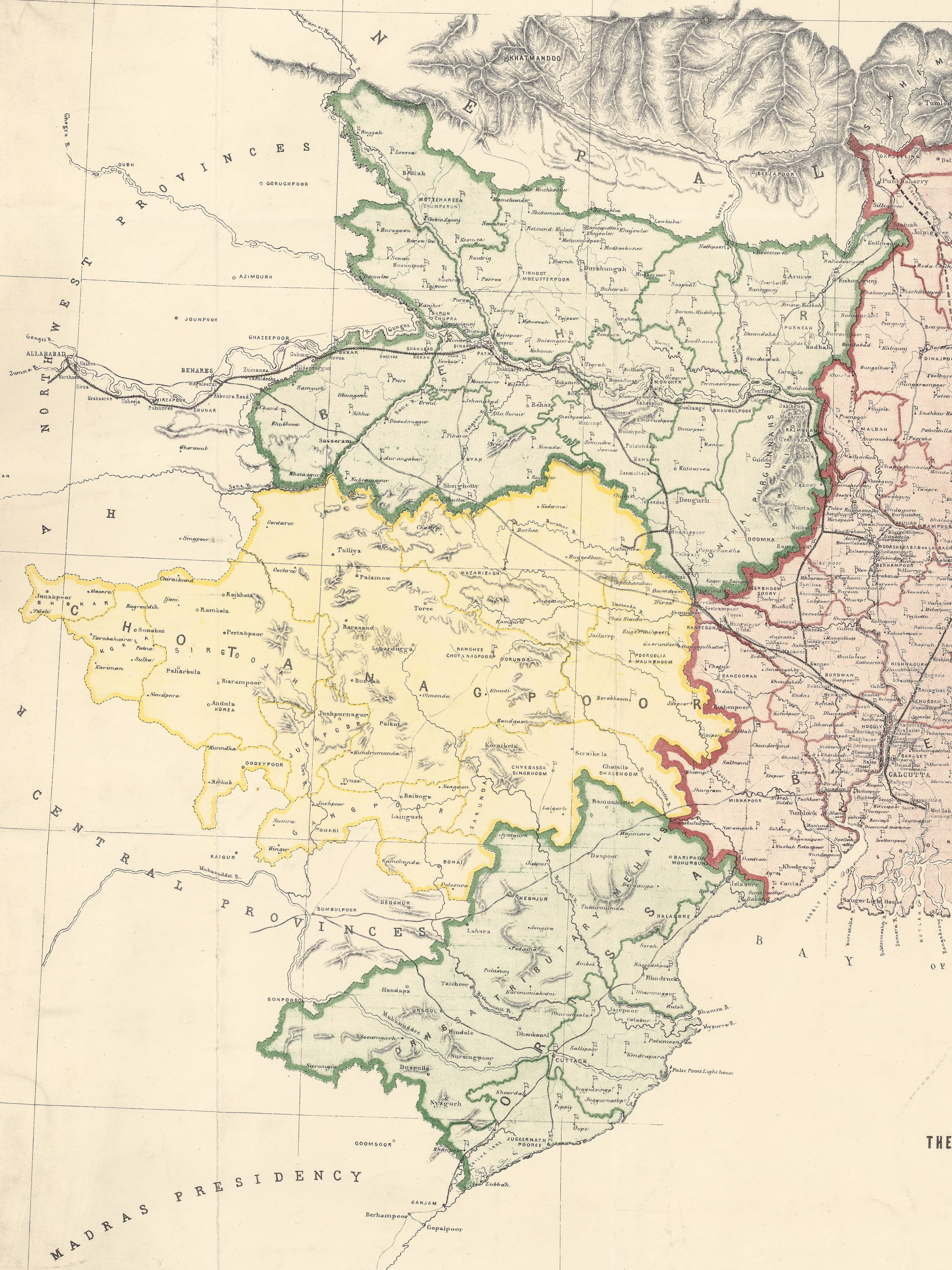
Purulia Under Chota Nagpur Division of the Bengal Presidency, 1872

=== Pre independence ===
By Regulation XVIX of 1805, a Jungle Mahals district composed of 23 parganas and mahals including the present Purulia was formed. By Regulation XIII of 1833 the Jungle Mahals district was broken up and a new district called Manbhum was constituted with headquarters at Manbazar. The district was very large in size and included parts of Bankura and Bardhaman districts of present West Bengal state and Dhanbad, Dhalbhum and Seraikela-Kharswan districts of present Jharkhand states. In 1838 the district headquarters was transferred from Manbazar to Purulia. Since the formation of the district it was withdrawn from regular administration and placed under an officer called Principal Assistant to the agent to the Governor-General for South-West Frontier. Under Act XX of 1854, the Principal Agent was redesignated as Deputy Commissioner, and the Chota Nagpur Division was formally established.

=== Post independence ===
Finally in 1956 Manbhum district was partitioned between Bihar and West Bengal following the States Reorganization Act and the Bihar and West Bengal (Transfer of Territories) Act 1956 and the present Purulia district was born on 1 November 1956. The district used to be a part of the Red Corridor.

== Geography ==
Purulia lies between 22.60 degrees and 23.50 degrees north latitudes and 85.75 degrees and 86.65 degrees east longitudes. Compass Declination 0º22'W. The geographical area of the district is 6,259 km^{2} (2,417 sq mi). This district is bordered on the east by Bankura, Paschim Medinipur districts, on the north by Bardhaman district of West Bengal state and Dhanbad district of Jharkhand state, on the west by Bokaro, Ramgarh district and Ranchi districts of Jharkhand state and on the south by West Singhbhum and East Singhbhum districts of Jharkhand state.

Purulia is the westernmost district of West Bengal with an all-India significance because of its tropical location, its shape as well as function like a funnel. It funnels not only the tropical monsoon current from the Bay to the subtropical parts of north-west India, but also acts as a gateway between the developed industrial belts of West Bengal and the hinterlands in Odisha, Jharkhand, Madhya Pradesh and Uttar Pradesh.

=== Climate ===
Using the Köppen classification, Purulia has a tropical savanna climate (Aw) and receives most of its rainfall during the monsoon season. Temperature is high in summer, averaging 40 °C (104 °F) and average in winter, around 10 °C (50 °F). Rainfall defines the climate of the district. South west monsoon is the principal source of rainfall in the district. Average annual rainfall varies between 1,100 and 1,500 mm (43 and 59 in). The relative humidity is high in monsoon season, being 75% to 85%. But in hot summer it comes down to 20% to 35%.

Climate data for Purulia (1981–2010, extremes 1901–2001)
| Month | Jan | Feb | Mar | Apr | May | Jun | Jul | Aug | Sep | Oct | Nov | Dec | Year |
|---|---|---|---|---|---|---|---|---|---|---|---|---|---|
| Record high °C (°F) | 33.4 (92.1) | 37.3 (99.1) | 41.7 (107.1) | 46.0 (114.8) | 46.3 (115.3) | 46.2 (115.2) | 40.7 (105.3) | 37.8 (100.0) | 39.0 (102.2) | 39.4 (102.9) | 35.1 (95.2) | 33.3 (91.9) | 46.3 (115.3) |
| Mean daily maximum °C (°F) | 24.6 (76.3) | 27.9 (82.2) | 33.1 (91.6) | 37.5 (99.5) | 38.0 (100.4) | 35.1 (95.2) | 32.1 (89.8) | 31.6 (88.9) | 31.7 (89.1) | 31.3 (88.3) | 28.7 (83.7) | 25.3 (77.5) | 31.4 (88.5) |
| Mean daily minimum °C (°F) | 11.2 (52.2) | 14.1 (57.4) | 18.7 (65.7) | 23.1 (73.6) | 24.8 (76.6) | 25.0 (77.0) | 24.5 (76.1) | 24.4 (75.9) | 23.7 (74.7) | 20.9 (69.6) | 16.3 (61.3) | 12.2 (54.0) | 19.9 (67.8) |
| Record low °C (°F) | 3.8 (38.8) | 6.3 (43.3) | 10.7 (51.3) | 13.5 (56.3) | 15.6 (60.1) | 18.3 (64.9) | 17.8 (64.0) | 17.2 (63.0) | 17.0 (62.6) | 13.2 (55.8) | 7.7 (45.9) | 5.7 (42.3) | 3.8 (38.8) |
| Average rainfall mm (inches) | 15.4 (0.61) | 22.9 (0.90) | 30.4 (1.20) | 39.1 (1.54) | 78.6 (3.09) | 282.6 (11.13) | 326.1 (12.84) | 295.9 (11.65) | 244.8 (9.64) | 93.3 (3.67) | 21.4 (0.84) | 15.2 (0.60) | 1,465.9 (57.71) |
| Average rainy days | 1.5 | 2.0 | 2.3 | 2.9 | 5.6 | 13.0 | 16.4 | 16.0 | 11.6 | 4.1 | 1.1 | 1.0 | 77.5 |
| Average relative humidity (%) (at 17:30 IST) | 55 | 46 | 39 | 38 | 48 | 67 | 79 | 80 | 77 | 67 | 60 | 59 | 59 |
Source: India Meteorological Department

=== Rivers and lakes ===
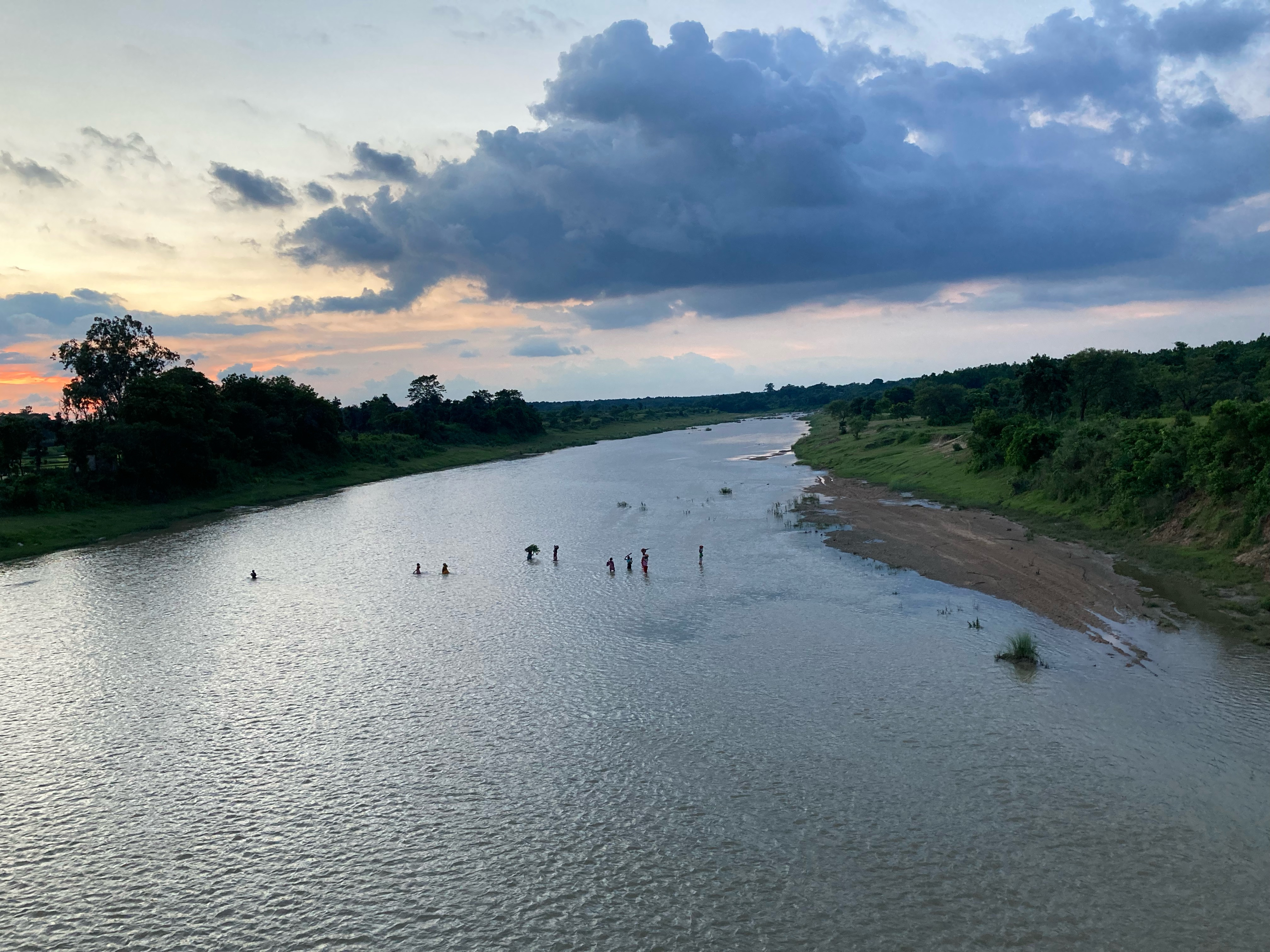
Kansabati River

Several rivers flow across Purulia district. Among these Kangsabati, Kumari, Silabati (silai), Dwarakeswar, Subarnarekha and Damodar are the important ones. Although several rivers flows across the district, 50% of the water run off due to the undulated topography. There are also several Small dams like Futiyary, Murguma, Pardi, Burda, Gopalpur, which are mainly used for irrigation of agriculture field. Saheb Bandh is one of the popular and famous waterbodies of Purulia. It is located in the heart of the purulia town. It is a shelter of the migratory birds which comes from Bangladesh, Burma, Sindh, Baluchistan during December to March.

=== Geology ===
Due to undulated topography nearly 50% of the rainfall flows away as runoff. The district is covered by mostly residual soil formed by weathering of bed rocks.

== Economy ==
The economy of the Purulia district is mainly driven by the industrial & Agricultural sector and tourism. Among these, the industrial sector is the backbone of the economy of the district.

From 2001, with the new industrial policies of government of West Bengal, this district has attracted investments in steel, cement and power sectors. The district has large scale industries like Santaldih Thermal Power Station at Santaldih, Pumped Storage Project at Baghmundi, ACC Damodar Cement Factory at Madhukunda. The Purulia Pumped Storage Project of West Bengal State Electricity Distribution Company Ltd. consists of 4 units with a capacity of 224 MW each, which generates 900 MW of electricity. DVC is involved with a thermal power plant in Raghunathpur sub division with a capacity of 2400 MW. It has investments in steel and cement sectors. The manufacturing sector specially the sponge iron sector got an investment of 306.17 crores, which is comparable to the economically developed districts of West Bengal.

Among small scale industries, the lac industry and sericulture industry is another major source of income of this district. Purulia produces 90% of the lac produced in West Bengal. Lac is cultivated in all the blocks of Purulia and about 70,000 people are associated with this industry. Sericulture industry is supported by the ample amount of caterpillar larvae as raw materials.

Tourism is another source of income for this district. Forests, hillocks, rivulets, streams, wildlife, flora, and fauna provide opportunities for tourism. Locations in the district such as Ajodhya Hills, Matha, Murguma Dam, Kuilapal Forests, Jaychandi Pahar, Panchakote Raj, and Duarsini Hills and Forests attract visitors to Purulia every year.

Due to the rough weather and soil, purulia lags behind in agricultural arena from the other districts of West Bengal. However cultivation of silk and lac are the main agricultural products.

In 2006 the Ministry of Panchayati Raj named Purulia one of the country's 250 most backward districts (out of a total of 640). It is one of the eleven districts in West Bengal that has received funds from the Backward Regions Grant Fund programme (BRGF).

== Divisions ==
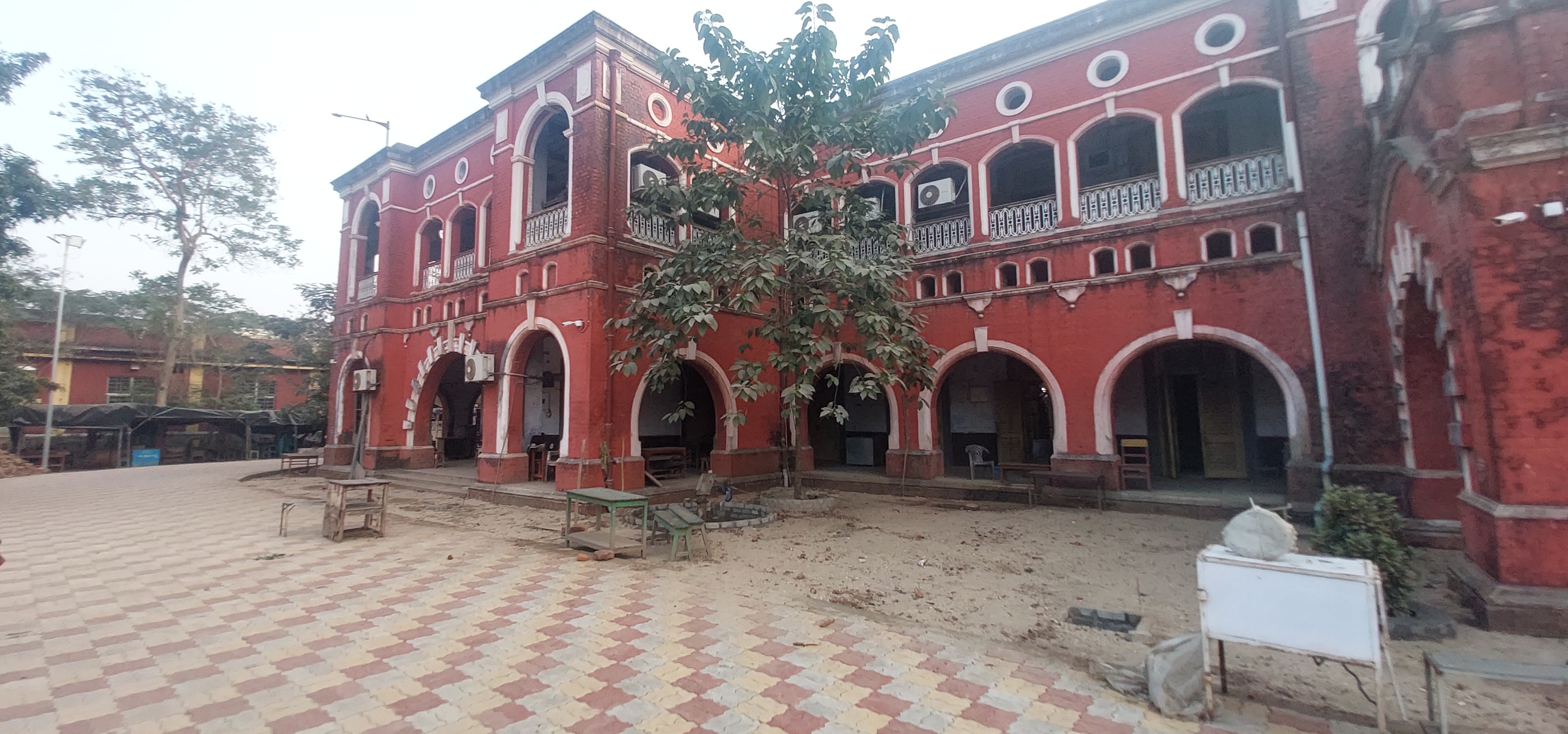
Purulia District Court

=== Administrative subdivisions ===
Administrative map of Purulia by Subdivision and Blocks

The district comprises four subdivisions: Purulia Sadar, Jhalda, Raghunathpur and Manbazar. Puruliya Sadar consists of Purulia municipality and five community development blocks: Purulia–I, Purulia–II, Hura, Puncha and Balarampur. Jhalda subdivision consists of Jhalda municipality and four community development blocks: Jhalda–I, Jhalda–II, Jaipur, Bagmundi. Raghunathpur subdivision consists of Raghunathpur municipality and six community development blocks: Para, Raghunathpur–I, Raghunathpur–II, Neturia, Santuri and Kashipur. Manbazar subdivision consists of five community development blocks: Manbazar–I, Manbazar–II Barabazar, Bandwan and Puncha. Purulia town is the district headquarters. There are 21 police stations, 20 development blocks, 3 municipalities, 170 gram panchayats, and 2459 inhabited villages in this district.

Each subdivision except Manbazar contains one municipality each along with community development blocks which in turn is divided into rural areas and census towns. In total there are 11 urban units: 3 municipalities and 9 census towns.

==== Purulia Sadar subdivision ====
- Purulia: municipality
- Purulia–I community development block consists of rural areas only with 8 gram panchayats.
- Purulia–II community development block consists of rural areas only with 9 gram panchayats.
- Hura community development block consists of rural areas only with 10 gram panchayats.
- Balarampur community development block consists of rural areas with 7 gram panchayats and one census town: Balarampur.
- Arsha is a community development block

==== Manbazar subdivision ====
- Manbazar I community development block consists of rural areas only with 10 gram panchayats.
- Manbazar II community development block consists of rural areas only with 8 gram panchayats.
- Bandwan community development block consists of rural areas only with 8 gram panchayats.
- Puncha community development block consists of rural areas only with 10 gram panchayats.
- Barabazar community development block consists of rural areas with 10 gram panchayats and one census town: Barabazar.

==== Jhalda subdivision ====
- Jhalda: municipality
- Jhalda–I community development block consists of rural areas only with 10 gram panchayats.
- Jhalda–II community development block consists of rural areas only with 9 gram panchayats.
- Joypur community development block consists of rural areas only with 7 gram panchayats.
- Baghmundi community development block consists of rural areas only with 8 gram panchayats.

==== Raghunathpur subdivision ====
- Raghunathpur: municipality
- Para community development block consists of rural areas with 10 gram panchayats and two census towns: Santaldih and Chapari.
- Raghunathpur I community development block consists of rural areas with 7 gram panchayats and one census town: Arra.
- Raghunathpur II community development block consists of rural areas with 6 gram panchayats and one census town: Nabagram.
- Neturia community development block consists of rural areas with 7 gram panchayats and two census towns: Hijuli and Par Beliya.
- Santuri community development block consists of rural areas only with 6 gram panchayats.
- Kashipur community development block consists of rural areas with 13 gram panchayats and one census town: Adra.

=== Assembly constituencies ===
The district is divided into assembly constituencies:

1. Bandwan (ST) (assembly constituency no. 234)
2. Manbazar (assembly constituency no. 243),
3. Balarampur (ST) (assembly constituency no. 235),
4. Joypur (assembly constituency no. 238),
5. Purulia (assembly constituency no. 239),
6. Para (SC) (assembly constituency no. 240),
7. Raghunathpur (SC) (assembly constituency no. 241),
8. Kashipur (ST) (assembly constituency no. 242)
9. Bagmundi Vidhan Sabha

Para constituency was reserved for Scheduled Castes (SC) candidates. Banduan, Manbazar, Balarampur, Arsa, Jhalda, Jaipur and Purulia constituencies formed the Purulia (Lok Sabha constituency). Para, Raghunathpur, Kashipur and Hura were assembly segments of Bankura (Lok Sabha constituency), which also contained three assembly segments from Bankura district.

==== Impact of delimitation of constituencies ====
As per order of the Delimitation Commission in respect of the delimitation of constituencies in the West Bengal, the district is presently divided into 9 assembly constituencies:

1. Bandwan (ST) (assembly constituency no. 234)
2. Balarampur (assembly constituency no. 239),
3. Baghmundi (assembly constituency no. 240),
4. Joypur (assembly constituency no. 241),
5. Purulia (assembly constituency no. 242),
6. Manbazar (ST) (assembly constituency no. 243),
7. Kashipur (assembly constituency no. 244),
8. Para (SC) (assembly constituency no. 245) and
9. Raghunathpur (SC) (assembly constituency no. 246).

Bandwan and Manbazar constituencies are reserved for Scheduled Tribes (ST) candidates, while Para and Raghunathpur constituencies are reserved for Scheduled Castes (SC) candidates. Banduan is an assembly segment of Jhargram (Lok Sabha constituency), which also contains six assembly segments from Paschim Medinipur district. Balarampur, Baghmundi, Jaipur, Purulia, Manbazar, Kashipur and Para constituencies will form the Purulia (Lok Sabha constituency). Raghunathpur assembly segment is part of Bankura (Lok Sabha constituency), which also contains six assembly segments from Bankura district.

== Demographics ==
Historical population
| Year | Pop. | ±% |
|---|---|---|
| 1901 | 777,801 | — |
| 1911 | 884,372 | +13.7% |
| 1921 | 831,497 | −6.0% |
| 1931 | 972,077 | +16.9% |
| 1941 | 1,088,201 | +11.9% |
| 1951 | 1,169,097 | +7.4% |
| 1961 | 1,360,016 | +16.3% |
| 1971 | 1,602,875 | +17.9% |
| 1981 | 1,853,801 | +15.7% |
| 1991 | 2,224,577 | +20.0% |
| 2001 | 2,536,516 | +14.0% |
| 2011 | 2,930,115 | +15.5% |
Source: Census of India

According to the 2011 census Purulia district has a population of 2,930,115, roughly equal to the nation of Jamaica or the US state of Arkansas. This gives it a ranking of 129th in India (out of a total of 640). The district has a population density of 468 inhabitants per square kilometre (1,210/sq mi). Its population growth rate over the decade 2001-2011 was 15.43%. Puruliya has a sex ratio of 955 females for every 1000 males, and a literacy rate of 65.38%. The literacy rates of male and female are 74.18% and 37.15% of the total population. 12.74% of the population lives in urban areas. Scheduled Castes and Scheduled Tribes collectively account for 37.83% (SC: 19.38% and ST: 18.45%) of the district's total population. The prominent communities in this group, in terms of the district's total population, are Santal (11.57%), Bauri (8.29%), Bhumij (3.57%), Sunri (excluding Saha) (1.68%), Rajwar (1.61%), Kora (1.14%), Hari (1.02%), Bhuiya (1.01%), Dom (0.98%), Chamar (0.88%), Dhoba (0.81%), Jalia Kaibartta (0.62%), Ghasi (0.45%), Lohar (0.45%), Bagdi/Duley (0.44%), Munda (0.35%), and Mahali (0.35%). Additionally, populations ranging between ten thousand to one thousand include Oraon, Savar, Bedia, Keot, Mal, Lodha/Kharia, Lohara, Gorait, and Dosadh.

=== Religion ===
Religion in Purulia district (2011)
| Hinduism | 81.00% |
| Other (tribal religion) | 10.55% |
| Islam | 7.75% |
| Other or not stated | 0.70% |

=== Language ===
Languages of Purulia district (2011)
1. Bengali (80.6%)
2. Santali (11.2%)
3. Kurmali (5.04%)
4. Hindi (1.93%)
5. Others (1.30%)

According to the 2011 census, 80.56% of the population spoke Bengali, 11.17% Santali, 5.04% Kurmali and 1.93% Hindi as their first language.

== Transport ==
Purulia district is well connected with other cities and towns of West Bengal and neighbourhood states by road and rail transport.

=== Rail ===
The District is served by three Rail connections provided by the South Eastern Railways. One line runs from Jharkhand in the South through the district up to Asansol passing through Adra division. Another line runs between Bankura and Dhanbad also via the Adra Division. The third line connects purulia with Jharkhand. Major cities and towns like Ranchi, Tatanagar, Patna, Howrah, Bokaro, Dhanbad, Lucknow, Asansol, Bhubaneswar, Puri, Durgapur, Mumbai, Chennai and Delhi are now well connected with this district by railways. The Railway Divisional Headquarter Adra railway division, which is one of the major rail division of South Eastern Railway, is situated on the northeastern part of Purulia district.

=== Road ===
The road transport is another important transportation medium of Purulia. The road transport is adequate in terms of bus availability and goods flow. NH 18 (NH 32) connects this district with Jamshedpur, Bokaro, Chas and Dhanbad. National Highway 60A (now NH 314) connects Purulia with State Highway 9 at Bankura and subsequently to NH2 at Durgapur. State Highway 5 also plays an important role in district's transport network as it connects the towns like Raghunathpur, Adra, Santaldih and Neturia to NH2 at Neamatpur and Asansol. Purulia has excellent road connectivity with Raniganj-Asansol industrial belt. South Bengal State Transport Corporation runs 4 buses from Purulia to Kolkata via State Highway 5 thus connecting towns and cities like Raghunathpur, Adra, Neturia to the industrial belt of Asansol, Raniganj, Durgapur and Burdwan. There are also many private bus operators on this route.

== Culture ==
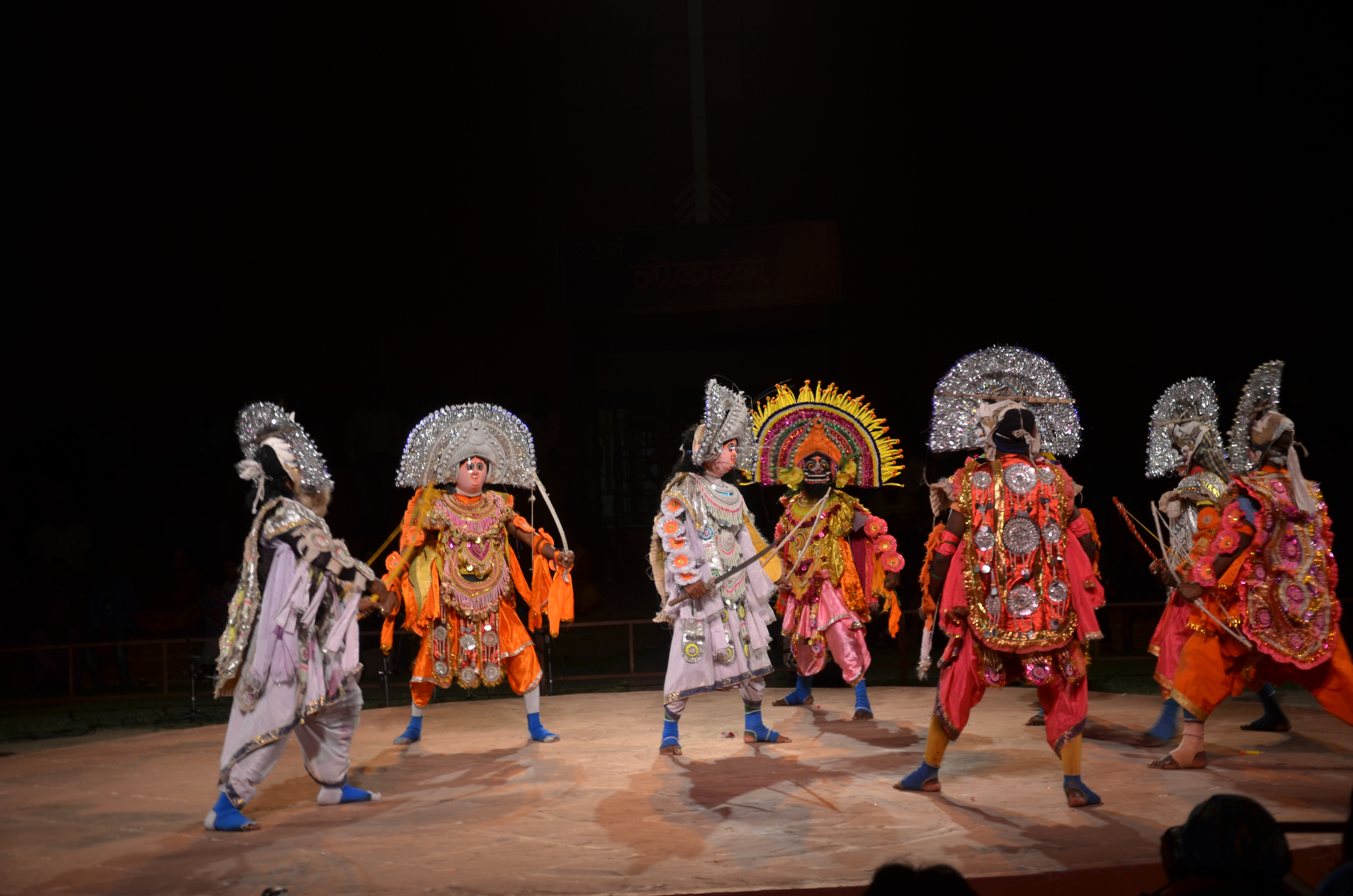
Chhau dance of Purulia

Purulia has rich cultural heritage. It has the mixed culture of Bengal, Jharkhand, and Odisha as it was a part of these areas for various times. From archaeological evidences to local festivals, every cultural event has got a tribal touch in it, which is the speciality of Purulia. Living mostly in rural areas and keeping intact many of their socio-cultural values, more or less in pristine forms, the rural people of Purulia have their folks to speak about many of their tenets. The distinctiveness of those is well demonstrated with the sentiments and feelings of the population and these are marked with splash of colours and often entwined with pathos, romanticism, velour and social consciousness. Purulia has a range of traditional song types, including Jhumair, Ahirageet, Bhadu, Bihargeet, Baul, Karamgeet, and Tusugeet. It is also the birthplace of a martial dance of Bengal Chhau.

== Tourism ==
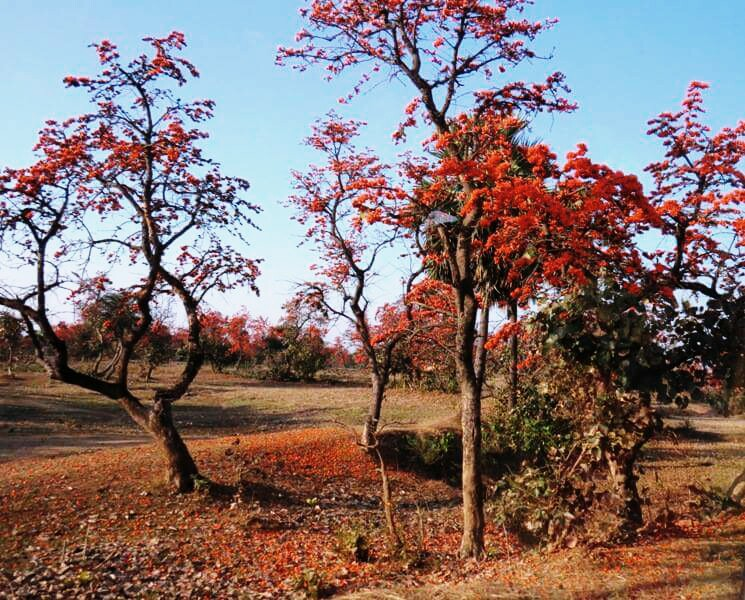
Palash (Butea monosperma) woodland at Baranti Forest

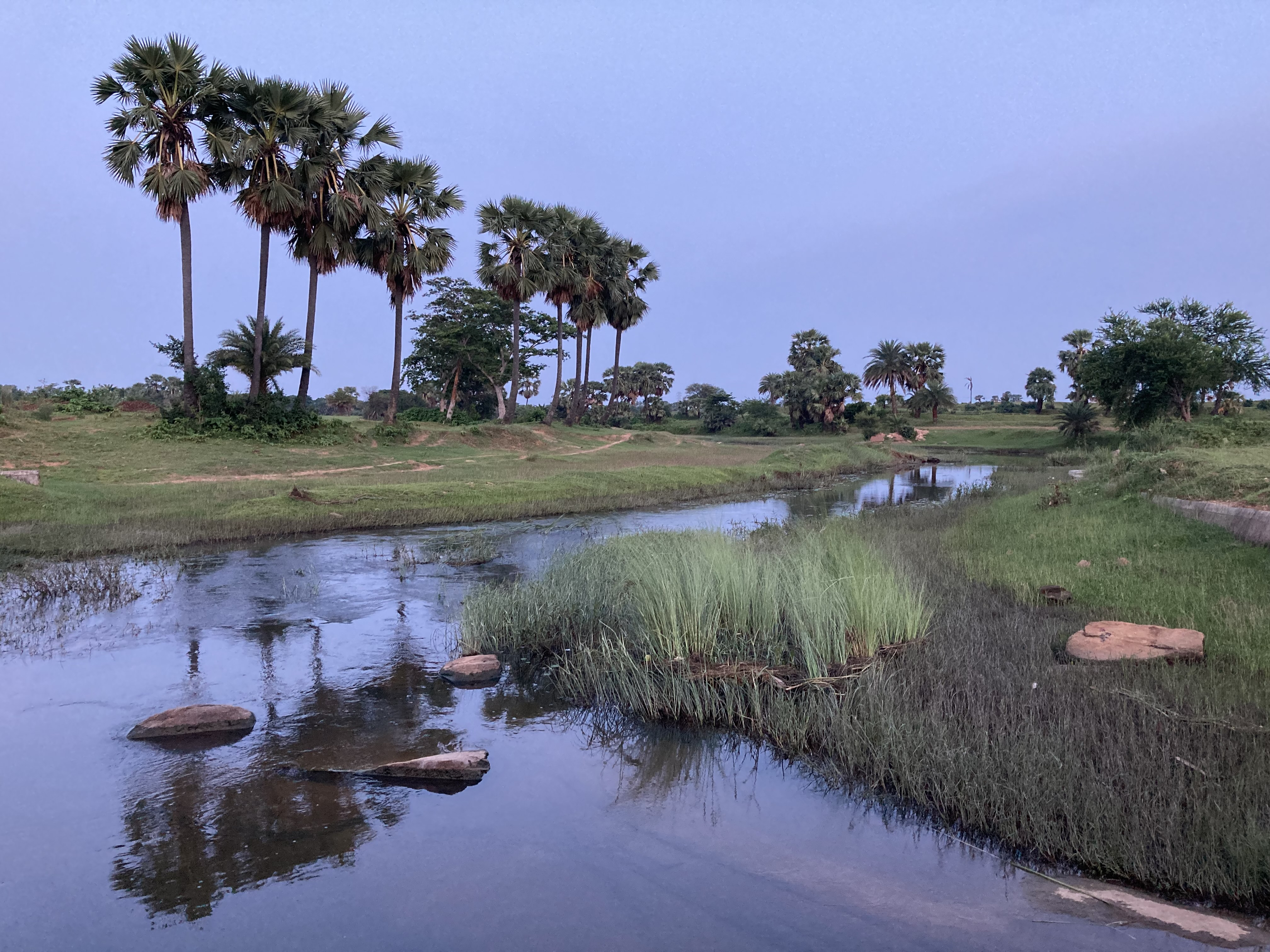
Patralekha River is a tributary of Kangsabati River

Tourists visit Purulia annually for a variety of reasons: to witness the natural scenery of Ayodhya, Turga Falls, PPSP Upper and Lower Dam, Dawri khal in Kesto Bazar Dam, Lahoria Shiv Mandir, Matha and Kuilapal, and falls and tribal habitations in Ajodhya Hills and Bagmundih. Other popular sites are Panchet, Murguma Dam and Futiari dam, the heritage building Panchakot Raj Place, the hiking spots Pakhi Hills and Joychandi Pahar, picnic spots like Baranti, Duarsini, Doladanga, Jamuna. Traditional folk dance and culture such as Chhou Dance and Jhumur Song are also popular.

== Notable people ==
- Ajitesh Bandopadhyay, Bengali actor, playwright, activist and director
- Bhabini Mahato, Indian freedom fighter
- Atul Chandra Ghosh, Indian freedom fighter
- Basudeb Acharia, politician
- Gambhir Singh Mura, Padma Shri awardee and Chhau dancer
- Labanya Prabha Ghosh, Indian freedom fighter
- Mabinul Haq, Sahitya Akademi Award for Bengali Translation winning Bengali writer
- Mihir Sen, first Indian to swim the English Channel from Dover to Calais in 1958
- Nepal Mahata, chhau artiste, He was awarded Padmashree in 1983
- Pinki Pramanik, an Indian track and field athlete winning silver at the 2006 Commonwealth Games, gold at the 2006 Asian Games, and gold at the 2005 Asian Indoor Games
- Shyam Sundar Besra, Sahitya Akademi Award-winning Santali and Hindi writer
- Anuparna Roy, an Indian film director and screenwriter. She won the Best Director Award in the Orizzonti (Horizons) section at the 82nd Venice International Film Festival in 2025 for her debut feature film Songs of Forgotten Trees.

== See also ==
- Bengali Language Movement (Manbhum)
- Purulia arms drop case
- Pandri, Purulia district (First solar-powered village in India)
