= Nituria =

- Village
- Location in West Bengal, India Nituria (India)
- Coordinates: 23°39′50.4″N 86°49′37.0″E
- Country: India
- State: West Bengal
- District: Purulia
- Subdivision: Raghunathpur

Government
  - Body: Gram panchayat

Languages
  - Official: Bengali, English
- Time zone: UTC+5:30 (IST)
- ISO 3166 code: IN-WB
- Website: wb.gov.in

Nituria (also spelled Neturia) is a village, with a police station, in the Neturia CD block in the Raghunathpur subdivision of the Purulia district in West Bengal, India.

== Geography ==
Places in Raghunathpur subdivision in Purulia district
M: municipal town, CT: census town, R: rural/ urban centre, H: historical/ religious centre, T: tourist centre
Owing to space constraints in the small map, the actual locations in a larger map may vary slightly

=== Location ===
Nituria is located at 23°39′50.4″N 86°49′37.0″E.

=== Area overview ===
Purulia district forms the lowest step of the Chota Nagpur Plateau. The general scenario is undulating land with scattered hills. Raghunathpur subdivision occupies the northern part of the district. 83.80% of the population of the subdivision lives in rural areas. However, there are pockets of urbanization and 16.20% of the population lives in urban areas. There are 14 census towns in the subdivision. It is presented in the map given alongside. There is a coal mining area around Parbelia and two thermal power plants are there – the 500 MW Santaldih Thermal Power Station and the 1200 MW Raghunathpur Thermal Power Station. The subdivision has a rich heritage of old temples, some of them belonging to the 11th century or earlier. The Banda Deul is a monument of national importance. The comparatively more recent in historical terms, Panchkot Raj has interesting and intriguing remains in the area.

Note: The map alongside presents some of the notable locations in the subdivision. All places marked in the map are linked in the larger full screen map.

== Demographics ==
According to the 2011 Census of India Nituria had a total population of 1,144 of which 580 (51%) were males and 564 (49%) were females. There were 149 persons in the age range of 0–6 years. The total number of literate persons in Nituria was 689 (69.25% of the population over 6 years).

== Civic administration ==
=== Police station ===
Neturia police station has jurisdiction over the Neturia CD block. The area covered is 203.65 km^{2} and the population covered is 101,922.

== Education ==
Panchakot Mahavidyalaya was established in 2001 at Sarbari.

Garh Panchakot International School is an English-medium coeducational institution, with a plan to extend classes to the higher secondary level of CBSE. It has hostel facilities. It is located at Sarbari morh, PO & PS Nituria.

Bhamuria S.M. High School is a Bengali-medium co-educational institution established in 1965. It has facilities for teaching from class V to class XII.

Neturia Girls School is a Bengali-medium girls only higher secondary school established in 1988.

== Culture ==
Garh Panchkot is a ruined 16th century fort/ palace of the Panchkot Raj at the foot of the Panchet Hill.

Achkoda, located in this block, showcases aatchala-style temples with terracotta work on the walls. One of these temples is dedicated to Raghunath and it was constructed by the local landlord of the area. Other temples are mortuary temples of Vaishnava sadhaks.

== Healthcare ==
Harmadih Rural Hospital, with 30 beds at Harmadih, is the major government medical facility in the Neturia CD block.
