= Gobag =

- Village
- Location in West Bengal, India Gobag (India)
- Coordinates: 23.5979°N 86.7587°E
- Country: India
- State: West Bengal
- District: Purulia

Population (2011)
  - Total: 1,395

Languages
  - Official: Bengali, English
- Time zone: UTC+5:30 (IST)
- PIN: 723160(Adra)
- Telephone/STD code: 03251
- Lok Sabha constituency: Bankura
- Vidhan Sabha constituency: Raghunathpur
- Website: purulia.gov.in

Gobag is a village in the Neturia CD block in the Raghunathpur subdivision of the Purulia district in the state of West Bengal, India.

== Geography ==
Places in Raghunathpur subdivision in Purulia district
M: municipal town, CT: census town, R: rural/ urban centre, H: historical/ religious centre, T: tourist centre
Owing to space constraints in the small map, the actual locations in a larger map may vary slightly

=== Location ===
Gobag is located at 23.5979°N 86.7587°E.

=== Area overview ===
Purulia district forms the lowest step of the Chota Nagpur Plateau. The general scenario is undulating land with scattered hills. Raghunathpur subdivision occupies the northern part of the district. 83.80% of the population of the subdivision lives in rural areas. However, there are pockets of urbanization and 16.20% of the population lives in urban areas. There are 14 census towns in the subdivision. It is presented in the map given alongside. There is a coal mining area around Parbelia and two thermal power plants are there – the 500 MW Santaldih Thermal Power Station and the 1200 MW Raghunathpur Thermal Power Station. The subdivision has a rich heritage of old temples, some of them belonging to the 11th century or earlier. The Banda Deul is a monument of national importance. The comparatively more recent in historical terms, Panchkot Raj has interesting and intriguing remains in the area.

Note: The map alongside presents some of the notable locations in the subdivision. All places marked in the map are linked in the larger full screen map.

== Demographics ==
According to the 2011 Census of India Gobag had a total population of 1,395 of which 715 (51%) were males and 680 (49%) were females. There were 165 persons in the age range of 0–6 years. The total number of literate persons in Gobag was 882 (71.71% of the population over 6 years).

== Civic administration ==
=== CD block HQ ===
The headquarters of Neturia CD block are located at Gobag (Ramkanali).

== Transport ==
Ramkanali is a station on the Asansol-Adra line of South Eastern Railway.

== Education ==
Janardandih High School is a Bengali-medium coeducational institution established in 1950. It has facilities for teaching from class V to class XII. It has a library with 6,500 books.

Gobag Junior High School is a Bengali-medium girls only institution established in 2011. It has facilities for teaching from class V to class VIII.

Ramkanali Purushottam Vidyapith is an English-medium coeducation institution. It was established in 2006 by Dr. Chittaranjan Chowdhuri, as per the ideals of Sri Sri Thakur Anukul Chandra. It has facilities for teaching from pre-nursery to class XII. It has a boys hostel.

== Culture ==
Garh Panchkot is a ruined 16th century fort/ palace of the Panchkot Raj at the foot of the Panchet Hill.

Achkoda, located in this block, showcases aatchala-style temples with terracotta work on the walls. One of these temples is dedicated to Raghunath and it was constructed by the local landlord of the area. Other temples are mortuary temples of Vaishnava sadhaks.

== Healthcare ==
Harmadih Rural Hospital, with 30 beds at Harmadih, is the major government medical facility in the Neturia CD block.
