= Saltore =

- Census Town
- Location in West Bengal, India Saltore (India)
- Coordinates: 23.6800°N 86.8089°E
- Country: India
- State: West Bengal
- District: Purulia

Area
  - Total: 4.4111 km^{2} (1.7031 sq mi)

Population (2011)
  - Total: 5,094
  - Density: 1,155/km^{2} (2,991/sq mi)

Languages
  - Official: Bengali, English
- Time zone: UTC+5:30 (IST)
- PIN: 723121
- Telephone/STD code: 03251
- Lok Sabha constituency: Bankura
- Vidhan Sabha constituency: Raghunathpur
- Website: purulia.gov.in

Saltore (also spelled Saltor) is a census town and a gram panchayat in the Neturia CD block in the Raghunathpur subdivision of the Purulia district in the state of West Bengal, India.

== Geography ==
Places in Raghunathpur subdivision in Purulia district
M: municipal town, CT: census town, R: rural/ urban centre, H: historical/ religious centre, T: tourist centre
Owing to space constraints in the small map, the actual locations in a larger map may vary slightly

=== Location ===
Saltore is located at 23.6800°N 86.8089°E.

As per the map of Neturia CD block on page 309 of District Census Handbook, Puruliya. Saltore, Hijuli and Parbelia form a cluster of census towns.

=== Area overview ===
Purulia district forms the lowest step of the Chota Nagpur Plateau. The general scenario is undulating land with scattered hills. Raghunathpur subdivision occupies the northern part of the district. 83.80% of the population of the subdivision lives in rural areas. However, there are pockets of urbanization and 16.20% of the population lives in urban areas. There are 14 census towns in the subdivision. It is presented in the map given alongside. There is a coal mining area around Parbelia and two thermal power plants are there – the 500 MW Santaldih Thermal Power Station and the 1200 MW Raghunathpur Thermal Power Station. The subdivision has a rich heritage of old temples, some of them belonging to the 11th century or earlier. The Banda Deul is a monument of national importance. The comparatively more recent in historical terms, Panchkot Raj has interesting and intriguing remains in the area.

Note: The map alongside presents some of the notable locations in the subdivision. All places marked in the map are linked in the larger full screen map.

== Demographics ==
According to the 2011 Census of India, Saltor had a total population of 5,094, of which 2,543 (50%) were males and 2,551 (50%) were females. There were 668 persons in the age range of 0–6 years. The total number of literate persons in Saltor was 2,961 (66.90% of the population over 6 years).

=== Languages ===
Languages spoken in Saltore Town (2011)
1. Bengali (64.3%)
2. Hindi (18.8%)
3. Santali (9.42%)
4. Urdu (6.89%)
5. Odia (0.36%)
6. Others (0.15%)

== Infrastructure ==
According to the District Census Handbook 2011, Puruliya, Saltor covered an area of 4.4111 km^{2}. There is a railway station at Asansol, 15 km away. Among the civic amenities, the protected water supply involved hand pumps. It had 343 domestic electric connections. Among the medical facilities it had 4 medicine shops. Among the educational facilities it had were 1 primary school, 1 middle school, 1 secondary school, the nearest senior secondary school at Parbelia 2 km away, the nearest general degree college at Sarbari 5 km away.

== Economy ==
=== Coal ===
There are presently (2020) two collieries under Sodepur Area of Eastern Coalfields Ltd., in Neturia CD block: Parbelia and Dubeswari. Saltore colliery functioned for many years from the days of Bird & Co.

== Education ==
Panchakot Mahavidyalaya was established in 2001 at Sarbari.

Saltore Colliery High School is a Bengali-medium coeducational institution established in 1947. It has facilities for teaching from class V to class X.

Saltore Colliery Hindi High School is a Hindi-medium coeducational institution established in 1974. It has facilities for teaching from class Vi to class XII.
