= Arra, Purulia =

Arra
- Census Town
- Location in West Bengal, India Arra (India)
- Coordinates: 23.50645°N 86.69361°E
- Country: India
- State: West Bengal
- District: Puruliya

Area
  - Total: 8.64 km^{2} (3.34 sq mi)

Population (2011)
  - Total: 21,272
  - Density: 2,460/km^{2} (6,380/sq mi)

Languages
  - Official: Bengali, English
- Time zone: UTC+5:30 (IST)
- PIN: 723121
- Telephone/STD code: 03251
- ISO 3166 code: IN-WB
- Vehicle registration: WB
- Website: purulia.gov.in

Arra is a census town in the Raghunathpur I CD block in the Raghunathpur subdivision of the Puruliya district in the state of West Bengal, India.

== Geography ==
Places in Raghunathpur subdivision in Purulia district
M: municipal town, CT: census town, R: rural/ urban centre, H: historical/ religious centre, T: tourist centre
Owing to space constraints in the small map, the actual locations in a larger map may vary slightly

=== Location ===
Aara is located at 23.5045°N 86.6963°E.

=== Area overview ===
Purulia district forms the lowest step of the Chota Nagpur Plateau. The general scenario is undulating land with scattered hills. Raghunathpur subdivision occupies the northern part of the district. 83.80% of the population of the subdivision lives in rural areas. However, there are pockets of urbanization and 16.20% of the population lives in urban areas. There are 14 census towns in the subdivision. It is presented in the map given alongside. There is a coal mining area around Parbelia and two thermal power plants are there – the 500 MW Santaldih Thermal Power Station and the 1200 MW Raghunathpur Thermal Power Station. The subdivision has a rich heritage of old temples, some of them belonging to the 11th century or earlier. The Banda Deul is a monument of national importance. The comparatively more recent in historical terms, Panchkot Raj has interesting and intriguing remains in the area.

Note: The map alongside presents some of the notable locations in the subdivision. All places marked in the map are linked in the larger full screen map.

== Demographics ==
According to the 2011 Census of India, Arra had a total population of 21,272, of which 11,135 (52%) were males and 10,137 (48%) were females. There were 2,063 persons in the age range of 0–6 years. The total number of literate persons in Arra was 15,604 (81.23% of the population over 6 years).

=== Languages ===
Languages spoken in Arra Town (2011)
1. Bengali (63.2%)
2. Hindi (31.0%)
3. Urdu (4.08%)
4. Telugu (0.59%)
5. Others (1.08%)

As of 2001 India census, Arra had a population of 19,911. Males constitute 52% of the population and females 48%. Arra has an average literacy rate of 66%, higher than the national average of 59.5%; with 59% of the males and 41% of females literate. 12% of the population is under 6 years of age.

== Infrastructure ==
According to the District Census Handbook 2011, Puruliya, Arra covered an area of 8.64 km^{2}. There is a railway station at Adra, 1 km away. Among the civic amenities, the protected water supply involved uncovered well, tube-well, bore-well. It had 1,665 domestic electric connections. Among the medical facilities it had 1 dispensary/ health centre. Among the educational facilities it had were 8 primary schools, 3 middle schools, the nearest secondary school, the nearest senior secondary school at Adra 1 km away, the nearest general degree college at Raghunathpur 8 km away. It had 2 special schools for disabled. Three important commodities it produced were paddy, clay pots and bamboo products.

== Education ==
Barabagan Junior High School is a Bengali-medium coeducational institution established in 2009. It has facilities for teaching from class V to class VIII.
