= Santuri, Purulia =

Santuri
- Village
- Location in West Bengal, India Santuri (India)
- Coordinates: 23°31′44″N 86°51′50″E
- Country: India
- State: West Bengal
- District: Purulia
- Subdivision: Raghunathpur

Government
  - Body: Gram panchayat

Languages
  - Official: Bengali, English
- Time zone: UTC+5:30 (IST)
- ISO 3166 code: IN-WB
- Website: wb.gov.in

Santuri is a village, with a police station, in the Santuri CD block in the Raghunathpur subdivision of the Purulia district in West Bengal, India.

== Geography ==
Places in Raghunathpur subdivision in Purulia district
M: municipal town, CT: census town, R: rural/ urban centre, H: historical/ religious centre, T: tourist centre
Owing to space constraints in the small map, the actual locations in a larger map may vary slightly

=== Location ===
Santuri is located at 23°31′44″N 86°51′50″E.

=== Area overview ===
Purulia district forms the lowest step of the Chota Nagpur Plateau. The general scenario is undulating land with scattered hills. Raghunathpur subdivision occupies the northern part of the district. 83.80% of the population of the subdivision lives in rural areas. However, there are pockets of urbanization and 16.20% of the population lives in urban areas. There are 14 census towns in the subdivision. It is presented in the map given alongside. There is a coal mining area around Parbelia and two thermal power plants are there – the 500 MW Santaldih Thermal Power Station and the 1200 MW Raghunathpur Thermal Power Station. The subdivision has a rich heritage of old temples, some of them belonging to the 11th century or earlier. The Banda Deul is a monument of national importance. The comparatively more recent in historical terms, Panchkot Raj has interesting and intriguing remains in the area.

== Demographics ==
As per 2011 Census of India Santuri had a total population of 2,700 of which 1,390 (51%) were males and 1,310 (49%) were females. Population below 6 years was 322. The total number of literates in Santuri was 1,576 (66.27% of the population over 6 years).

== Police station ==
Santuri police station has jurisdiction over Santuri CD Block. The area covered is 179.69 km^{2} and the population covered is 78,461.

== Transport ==
State Highway 8 (West Bengal) running from Santaldih (in Purulia district) to Majhdia (in Nadia district) passes through Santuri.

== Healthcare ==
Santuri Primary Health Centre functions with 10 beds.
