= Hijuli =

- Census Town
- Location in West Bengal, India Hijuli (India)
- Coordinates: 23.6773°N 86.8155°E
- Country: India
- State: West Bengal
- District: Puruliya

Population (2011)
  - Total: 7,917

Languages
  - Official: Bengali, English
- Time zone: UTC+5:30 (IST)
- Postal code: 713121
- ISO 3166 code: IN-WB
- Vehicle registration: WB
- Website: purulia.gov.in

Hijuli is a census town in the Neturia CD block in Raghunathpur subdivision of the Purulia district in the Indian state of West Bengal.

== Geography ==
Places in Raghunathpur subdivision in Purulia district
M: municipal town, CT: census town, R: rural/ urban centre, H: historical/ religious centre, T: tourist centre
Owing to space constraints in the small map, the actual locations in a larger map may vary slightly

=== Location ===
Hijuli is located at 23.6773°N 86.8155°E.

Hijuli is not marked on Google maps. The location has been identified as per the map of Neturia CD block on page 309 of District Census Handbook, Puruliya. Saltore, Hijuli and Parbelia form a cluster of census towns.

=== Area overview ===
Purulia district forms the lowest step of the Chota Nagpur Plateau. The general scenario is undulating land with scattered hills. Raghunathpur subdivision occupies the northern part of the district. 83.80% of the population of the subdivision lives in rural areas. However, there are pockets of urbanization and 16.20% of the population lives in urban areas. There are 14 census towns in the subdivision. It is presented in the map given alongside. There is a coal mining area around Parbelia and two thermal power plants are there – the 500 MW Santaldih Thermal Power Station and the 1200 MW Raghunathpur Thermal Power Station. The subdivision has a rich heritage of old temples, some of them belonging to the 11th century or earlier. The Banda Deul is a monument of national importance. The comparatively more recent in historical terms, Panchkot Raj has interesting and intriguing remains in the area.

Note: The map alongside presents some of the notable locations in the subdivision. All places marked in the map are linked in the larger full screen map.

== Demographics ==
According to the 2011 Census of India Hijuli had a total population of 7,917 of which 4,277 (54%) were males and 3,640 (46%) were females. There were 836 persons in the age range of 0–6 years. The total number of literate persons in Hijuli was 5,604 (79.14% of the population over 6 years).

=== Languages ===
Languages spoken in Hijuli (2011)
1. Bengali 28.67 (27.6%)
2. Hindi 52.83 (50.9%)
3. Magadhi 8.23 (7.93%)
4. Khortha 2.76 (2.66%)
5. Bhojpuri 2.19 (2.11%)
6. Santali 0.18 (0.17%)
7. Others 8.89 (8.57%)

As of 2001 India census, Hijuli had a population of 6856. Males constitute 53% of the population and females 47%. Hijuli has an average literacy rate of 61%, higher than the national average of 59.5%: male literacy is 71%, and female literacy is 50%. In Hijuli, 15% of the population is under 6 years of age.

== Infrastructure ==
According to the District Census Handbook 2011, Puruliya, Hijuli covered an area of 1.42 km^{2}. There is a railway station at Barakar, 8 km away. Among the civic amenities, the protected water supply involved hand pumps. It had 600 domestic electric connections. Among the medical facilities it had 1 maternity and child welfare centre and 5 medicine shops. Among the educational facilities it had were 2 primary schools, 1 secondary school, 1 senior secondary school, the nearest general degree college at Sarbari 5 km away.

== Education ==
Panchakot Mahavidyalaya was established in 2001 at Sarbari.

Parbelia Colliery Hindi Higher Secondary School is a Hindi-medium institution established in 1945. It has facilities for teaching from class V to class XII.

Parbelia Colliery High School is a Bengali-medium coeducational institution established in 1964. It has facilities for teaching from class V to class XII.
