= Basudeb Acharia =

Indian communist politician (1942–2023)

MP Basudeb Acharia

Member of the Indian Parliament
- In office 1980–2014
- Preceded by: Bijoy Mondal
- Succeeded by: Moon Moon Sen
- Constituency: Bankura

Leader of Communist Party of India (Marxist) Parliamentary Party, Lok Sabha
- In office 2004–2014
- Preceded by: Somnath Chatterjee
- Succeeded by: P. Karunakaran

Personal details
- Born: 11 July 1942 Bero, Purulia district, Burdwan division, Bengal Province, British India
- Died: 13 November 2023 (aged 81) Hyderabad, Telangana, India
- Party: Communist Party of India (Marxist)
- Spouse: Rajlakhsmi Acharia
- Children: 3
- As of 17 September, 2006

Basudeb Acharia (11 July 1942 – 13 November 2023) was an Indian Bengali-Tamil politician and a leader of the Communist Party of India (Marxist) political party. His ancestors were originally from Present-day Tamil Nadu, who settled in Bengal in 16th century. He considered himself to be a Bengali.

== Early life ==
The son of Kanai Lal Acharia and Konak Lata Acharia, he was born in Bero village of Raghunathpur I block in Purulia district to a family of Tamil Brahmins, who had once migrated to the village during the 16th century as the royal priests of Garh Panchkot under the Panchkot Raj family. He lived in Kantaranguni, P.O. Adra, in Purulia district. He held a M.A. and B.T. He got involved with politics from his student life. After completing his MA from Ranchi University, he started his career as a school teacher.

== Early political life ==
Working as a school teacher, he evolved as a state level leader of the All Bengal Teachers Association. He was arrested in 1974 during the historic 20-day railway strike for his involvement in organising the railway workers. In 1980, he was nominated as the CPIM candidate for the 1980 Indian general election from the Bankura constituency after Biman Bose, initially party's first choice as the candidate, opted out due to his preference in organisational activities instead of parliamentary politics and instead proposed Acharia's name to the party as a potential candidate. Acharia was elected for the first time as a member of the 7th Lok Sabha from Bankura constituency in 1980.

Acharia was a member of the Puruliya district committee of CPI(M). In 1981, he was inducted as a member of the CPI(M) Purulia district committee and to the CPIM West Bengal State Committee in 1985. From 1985 until his death, he was a member of the CPI(M) West Bengal State Committee.

== Political career ==
Acharia was re-elected to the Lok Sabha repeatedly in 1989, 1991, 1996, 1998, 1999, 2004, and 2009.

While in Lok Sabha he was associated with Committee on Railways, member, Rules Committee, General Purposes Committee, Committee on Security in Parliament Complex, and Committee on Installation of Portraits/Statues of National Leaders and Parliamentarian in Parliament House.

Acharia served as the chairman, Committee on Public Undertakings from 1990 to 1991.Between 1993 and 96 he was the chairman, Committee on Government Assurances. From 1990 to 1996 he was a member of the Consultative Committee, Ministry of Railways.

In 1996–97 he was the chairman, Committee on Railways and a Member, Consultative Committee, Ministry of Industry. In 1998–99 he was the Convenor, Sub-Committee on Power, Committee on Energy and a Special Invitee, Consultative Committee, Ministry of Railways. Between 1999 and 2004 he was the chairman, Committee on Petitions.

Acharia was elected as leader of the CPI (M) Parliamentary Party in the 14th Lok Sabha in 2004 after Somnath Chatterjee was elected as Lok Sabha Speaker. He was a member of several parliamentary committees. In 2007, he was made the chairman, Committee on Railways.

In 2005, he was elected as a member of the Central Committee of the Communist Party of India (Marxist) from the 18th party congress held at New Delhi. He was also one of the All India Vice-presidents of the Centre of Indian Trade Unions.

In 2009, he was re-elected as the leader of the CPI (M) Parliamentary Party in the 15th Lok Sabha. From August 2009 to 2014, he served as the chairman, Committee on Agriculture.

Acharia visited several nations as a parliamentarian.

Acharia was a senior trade union leader. He was one of the vice-presidents of the Centre of Indian Trade Unions, also of DVC Shramik Union, Colliery Mazdoor Sabha. He was a member of the General Council of the CITU and its member of West Bengal State Working Committee. He was also the President of Purulia District CITU.

Acharia served as a President of West Bengal Railway Contractor Labour Union, DVC Contractor Workers Union, LIC Agent Organisation of India, Thikadar Sramik Union (at Santaldih Thermal Power Station) and at Damodar Cement & Slag Workers Union.

Acharia lost the 2014 Lok Sabha election to Moonmoon Sen, a film actress who contested the elections with the symbol of Trinamool Congress.

During 2018 Panchayat elections he was attacked by the Trinamool Congress and was left bloodied and injured while leading a procession with candidates for filing nomination at the BDO office of Kashipur in Purulia district.

Acharia remained in the state committee till 2018 and in the central committee until 2022. Between 2018 and 2022, he was the chairman of CPI(M)'s central control commission. During 2018 to 2022, he was also made an invited member of CPI(M) state committee.

== Personal life and death ==
Acharia married Rajlakhsmi on 25 February 1975. The couple had one son and two daughters.

Basudeb Acharia died in Hyderabad on 13 November 2023, at the age of 81.

Party political offices
Preceded by Somnath Chatterjee	Leader of the Communist Party of India (Marxist) in the 15th Lok Sabha; 2004-2014	Succeeded by P. Karunakaran
