= Bero railway station =

Railway station in West Bengal, India

BERO

- Bero station seen from track

General information
- Location: Bero, Purulia district, West Bengal; India
- Coordinates: 23.5482°N 86.7265°E
- Elevation: 147 metres (482 ft)
- System: Indian Railways station
- Line: Asansol–Tatanagar–Kharagpur line
- Platforms: 2

Construction
- Structure type: At ground
- Parking: Available
- Cycle facilities: Not available

Other information
- Station code: BERO
- Zone(s): South Eastern Railway
- Division(s): Adra

History
- Opened: 1891
- Electrified: 1957–62
- Former names: Bengal Nagpur Railway
Services
Preceding station	Indian Railways	Following station
Ramkanali towards ?	South Eastern Railway zone Asansol–Adra section	Joychandi Pahar towards ?
Route map
Location
- Location within India Location within West Bengal
- Interactive map of Bero

Bero railway station serves Bero and surrounding villages in Purulia district in the Indian state of West Bengal.

== History ==
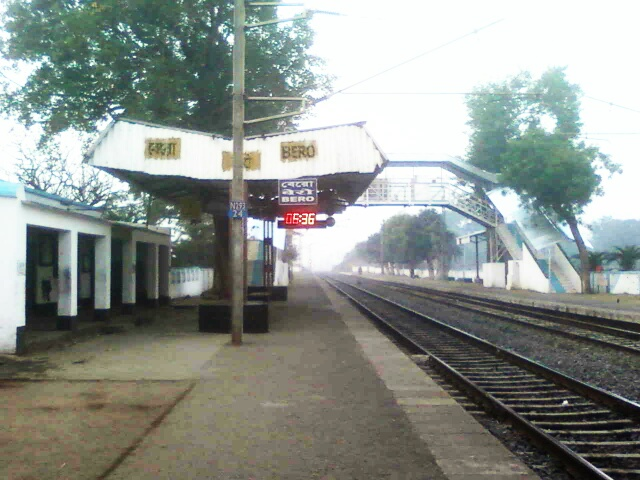
Bero railway station

The Bengal Nagpur Railway was formed in 1887 for the purpose of upgrading the Nagpur Chhattisgarh Railway and then extending it via Bilaspur to Asansol, in order to develop a shorter Howrah–Mumbai route than the one via Allahabad. The Bengal Nagpur Railway main line from Nagpur to Asansol, on the Howrah–Delhi main line, was opened for goods traffic on 1 February 1891.

=== History of settlement ===
Iyengars are mainly settled in the states of Tamil Nadu, Karnataka and Andhra Pradesh. A small section has settled in the village Bero (Gadi Bero), Purulia, West Bengal. Migration of this vaishnavite community from South India to a remote village of Purulia District of West Bengal is connected with the history of Panchakot Raj. Although no authentic history of settlement Iyengars in Bero is available but from the publication of Sri B.K. Gokhle, ICS, Settlement Officer Chotanagpur, named "Survey and Settlement Operation", published in the year 1928 at Govt. Printing Press, Patna. It has been recorded that in the middle of 17th century a learned and virtuous Brahmin named Trilochanacharya alias Tiru Ranga Acharya alias Trilochan of Kanchi, while returning from pilgrimage of various North Indian shrines on foot, came to the foothills of Panchakot for rest. While he was meditating, cowherds nearby saw emanating radiant rays from his body. This supernatural phenomenon was reported to the then Maharaja of Panchakot state, Sri Satrughna Singh alias Gorur Narayan Singh. Maharaja, after seeing the wonderful phenomenon, prayed him to live in his palace and to initiate him as his disciple...The saint did not agree to his proposal but agreed to send his brother Rangaraj, who was also a saint of high order to become the Raja Guru of Maharaja of Panchakot. After some time, probably in the year 1651, brother of Tirumalacharya, Sri Rangaraj arrived at Panchakot and met the maharaja. Later, the saint initiated the maharaja as his disciple. After few days, Sri Rangaraj moved his residence to the foothill of Bero hills and prayed for the Mohantaship of the deity Sri Keshab Roy Jiu of the Bero temple. The Maharaja of Panchakot state granted him Sevait (custodian) of the deity and also made him custodian of 57 1\2 Mouzas of Devattar state on behalf of the deity. Other family members of Sri Rangaraj were also brought to Bero. Vedic Brahmins in South India had no constant income except revenue from agricultural produce from their lands. They had to maintain a huge family. In order to improve their economic condition and through the influence of Brahmins, who were already migrated to Gadi Bero, these Brahmins not only from Kanchipuran but also from Ambasamudram and surrounding villages in Tirunelveli Districts.

So, the village Bero became the permanent seat (Gadi) of Mohantta. Since then, Bero is also known as Gadi Bero. This also marked the beginning of settlement of Iyengars in this part of Eastern India. In course of time, many other Iyengar families from different parts of the then Madras Province migrated to this village under the patronage of the Raj Guru and the Maharaja of Panchakot. The Maharaja had special likings for this Vedic orthodox south Indian Brahmins. Brahmotter properties were donated to each such family. Migration continued till 19th century, during the tenure of different maharajas. In the meantime, the capital of the Panchakot state shifted to Kashipur village after the attack of Bargis. More than forty families settled in this village and gradually adapted to the new socio-linguistic environment. This micro settlement of Iyengars kept intact the south Indian traditions and customs, and with the passage of time, local cultures were also adapted. Functions like Upanayan, Marriage etc. are still being held in South Indian traditions. Marriages are arranged for the boys and girls of this village from place in South India through contacts maintained by them constantly. Language barrier is ignored as the boys and girls are capable of learning their spouse's language in no time. Nowadays, most of the children knew English fluently and Hindi in conversation type.

Survival of Iyengars in this alien environment can be attributed to their contributions in the field of Education and culture of the area. Establishment of a High School by the then Mahanta Raj Gopal Acharya Goswami in the village was an important step. Later on, with the contributions from Iyengar community and also from other donors, one High School for girls was also established. Since the abolition of zamindari system in West Bengal agricultural income of Iyengars of the village was reduced and migration of educated youth for job began. New settlements within the country and abroad are being made by the Iyengars from Bero. Many of them are maintaining contact with their ancestral place. It is expected that this article will evoke response from all persons belonging to Iyengar community who have direct or indirect connection with the place. Their suggestions are welcome.

Sri Gopala Govindachariar, a great Sanskrit scholar of this village composed divine verses on the native deity Keshab, which are even today recited daily in the temple. Keshavashtagam composed by him explains the glory of lord Krishna and present generation youngsters are in the habit of reciting this slokas every day in their morning prayers and strongly believe that the grace of deity Keshab is showered on them. He has also composed Keshab Subrapadham in Samskrit. Akanda Rama japam is conducted every year for 3 days and everyone, not only from Gadi Bero but also from the neighboring villages, participates in this event without fail. Though the Iyengar population in the village has come down considerably due to large scale of migration to major cities, a small number of families still lives in the village and maintains the temple of lord Keshab with all daily rituals poojas and yearly festivals.

A number of persons belonging to Gadi Bero Iyengar community have contributed in different walks of life such as Dr V Ranga Chari, Mathematician, Dr Govinda Chari, Principal, Patna Medical College, Dr N K Achari, Neuro Surgeon Dr A N Achari Physician, Sri S.Vir Raghab Achari, Freedom fighter, Sri Basudeb Acharia MP, Jagannath Tathachari, Chief General Manager BSNL (Retd), Srinivasacharya, Managing Director, Sundaram PNB Paribas Home Finance Limited, Dr. Anupama Mishra (Senera Village), Research Scientist., Venkataraman Acharya, Senior Vice President, Kotak Mahindra bank Limited, Mumbai

=== Electrification ===
The Tatanagar–Adra–Asansol section was electrified in the 1957–1962 period.
