= Adra, Purulia =

Adra Adra(CT)
- Town
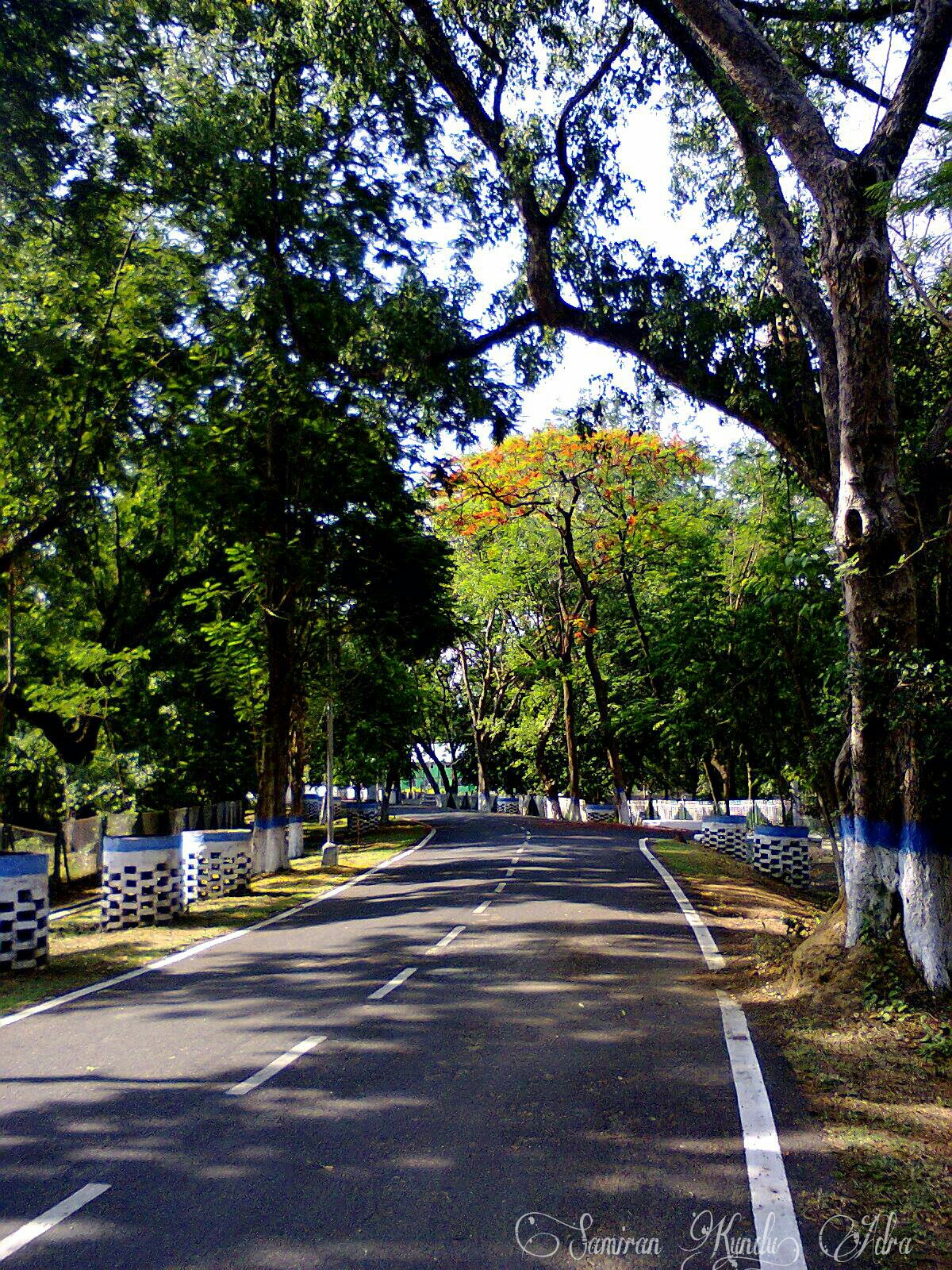
- Nickname: City of Cakes
- Location in West Bengal, India Adra (India)
- Coordinates: 23.5°N 86.67°E
- Country: India
- State: West Bengal
- District: Purulia district
- Established: 1800's
- Founder: Britishers (land provided by The King of Kashipur)
- Named for: BNR railway settlement, Adra

Area
  - Total: 15.69 km^{2} (6.06 sq mi)
  - Rank: 2
- Elevation: 185 m (607 ft)

Population (2025(estimated))
  - Total: 40,000
  - Rank: 4
- Demonym: Adravasi

Languages
  - Official: Bengali, English
- Time zone: UTC+5:30 (IST)
- PIN: 723121
- Telephone code: 03251
- ISO 3166 code: IN-WB
- Vehicle registration: WB-82/WB-37/WB-38/WB-44(44A,44B,44C,44D)
- Lok Sabha constituency: Purulia and Bankura
- Vidhan Sabha constituency: Kashipur and Raghunathpur
- Website: purulia.gov.in

Adra is a town and a railway colony situated in the Raghunathpur subdivision of Purulia district in the Indian state of West Bengal. It was well known for its Anglo-Indian population. It is also an important town of north east Purulia. Adra is also a well known railway divisional headquarter of South Eastern Railways.

== Geography ==
Places in Raghunathpur subdivision in Purulia district
M: municipal town, CT: census town, R: rural/ urban centre, H: historical/ religious centre, T: tourist centre
Owing to space constraints in the small map, the actual locations in a larger map may vary slightly

=== Location ===
The major sub-divisions of Adra are Agradoot, Subhasnagar, Beniasole, Sixty Four Unit, Palashkola, Kantaranguni, Jhariadih, Panchudanga, Mission para, Laldanga, Daulatpur, Arabinda Pally and SER colonies (North and South).

=== Area overview ===
Purulia district forms the lowest step of the Chota Nagpur Plateau. The general scenario is undulating land with scattered hills. Raghunathpur subdivision occupies the northern part of the district. 83.80% of the population of the subdivision lives in rural areas. However, there are pockets of urbanization and 16.20% of the population lives in urban areas. There are 14 census towns in the subdivision. It is presented in the map given alongside. There is a coal mining area around Parbelia and two thermal power plants are there – the 500 MW Santaldih Thermal Power Station and the 1200 MW Raghunathpur Thermal Power Station. The subdivision has a rich heritage of old temples, some of them belonging to the 11th century or earlier. The Banda Deul is a monument of national importance. The comparatively more recent in historical terms, Panchkot Raj has interesting and intriguing remains in the area.

Note: The map alongside presents some of the notable locations in the subdivision. All places marked in the map are linked in the larger full screen map.

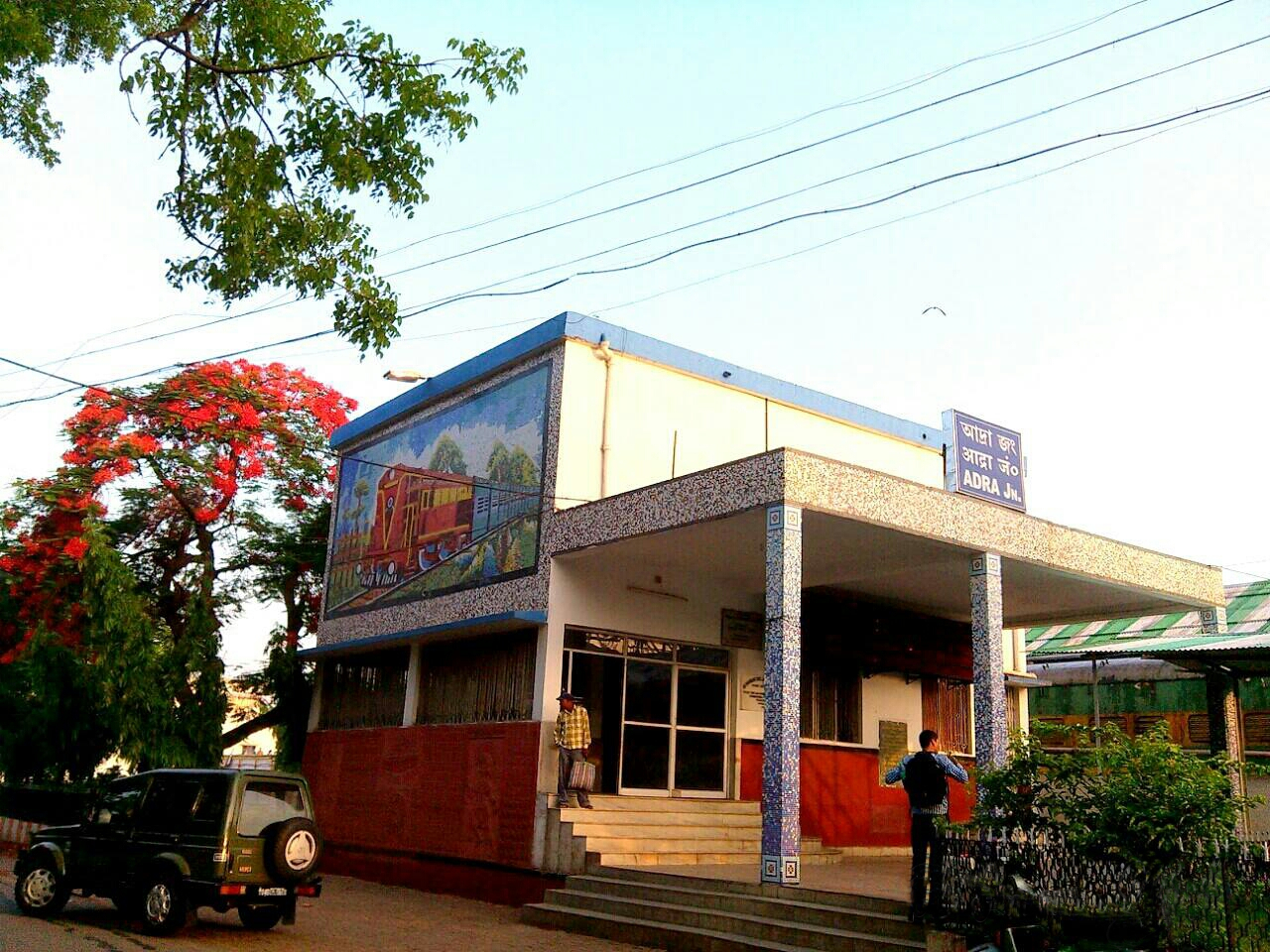
Adra Junction railway station

=== Railway centre ===
Adra is the divisional headquarters of the Adra division of South Eastern Railway. The economy of the town is driven by the presence of the railways there. It is one of the three important coal loading divisions (the other two being Bilaspur and Dhanbad) which supply coal to power plants across India.

An important railway junction, Adra railway station connects to Asansol on the Howrah-Delhi Main Line, Tatanagar on the Howrah-Nagpur-Mumbai line, Kharagpur on the Kolkata-Chennai and Kolkata-Mumbai lines, and Gomoh on the Kolkata-Delhi line. The present station building was built in 1903.

== Demographics ==
According to the 2011 census of India, Adra had a total population of 14,956, of which 7,596 (51%) were males and 7,360 (49%) were females. There were 1,187 persons in the age range of 0–6 years. The total number of literate persons in Adra was 11,565 (83.99% of the population over 6 years).

In 2001, Adra had a population of 22,118 Males constitute 52% of the population and females 48%. Adra has an average literacy rate of 73%, higher than the national average of 59.5%; with 56% of the males and 44% of females literate. 10% of the population was under 6 years of age.

=== Languages ===
Languages spoken in Adra Town (2011)
1. Bengali (42.7%)
2. Hindi (28.1%)
3. Telugu (11.6%)
4. Urdu (2.98%)
5. Marwari (1.20%)
6. Others (13.4%)

== Infrastructure ==
According to the District Census Handbook 2011, Puruliya, Adra covered an area of 8.79 km^{2}. There is a railway station at Adra. Among the civic amenities, it had 48.7 km roads with both open and covered drains, the protected water supply involved overhead tank and service reservoir. It had 30,506 domestic electric connections and 869 road lighting points. Among the medical facilities it had 1 Railway divisional hospital, 2 dispensary/ health centre, 2 family welfare centre, 1 maternity and child welfare centre, 15 medicine shops. Among the educational facilities it had were 8 primary schools, 6 secondary schools, 4 senior secondary schools, the nearest degree college at Raghunathpur 8 km away. Among the social, recreational and cultural facilities, it had 2 stadium, 6 auditorium/ community hall, 2 public library and 1 reading room. It had the branches of 5 nationalised banks and 1 co-operative bank.

== Tourism ==
Joychandi Pahar is a popular tourist destination located 4 km north from the town. There is also the nature park Swarn Jayanti Park, the natural water reservoir Saheb Bandh, and the Monpura reserve forest. Adra is known for Sacred Heart Church, which is one of the oldest churches built by the British in 1918. Sacred Heart Church which is also running a missionary school is the largest church under the Jamshedpur Diocese.

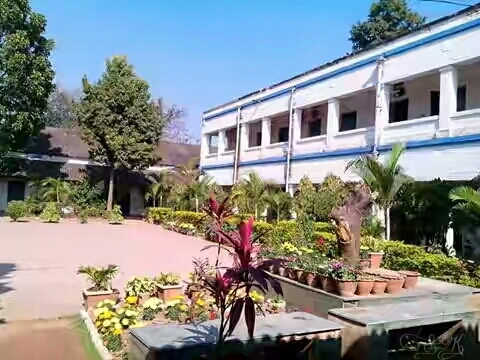
A part of S.E.Rly. Boys' H.S. School, Adra

== Education ==
There is Kendriya Vidyalaya, which is a part of the Kendriya Vidyalaya Sangathan (KVS), under the Ministry of HRD. The South Eastern Railway Boys' School, South Eastern Railway Girls' High School, South Eastern Railway Primary School, Sacred Heart School, Ashram School, Vidyasagar Vidyapith. Two colleges, Michael Madhusudan College and Raghunathpur College reside there.

== Sports ==
Adra is the state centre for training for the Bharat Scouts and Guides, and holds the Presidents' Award selection camps occasionally. It has the SERSA Stadium and Engineering Ground where annual Football and Cricket events are held.
