= Ramkanali Junction railway station =

Railway Station in West Bengal, India

RAMKANALI JUNCTION
- Indian Railways logo

General information
- Location: Ramkanali, Purulia district, West Bengal; India
- Coordinates: 23.5797°N 86.7619°E
- Elevation: 157 metres (515 ft)
- System: Indian Railways junction station
- Owner: Indian Railways
- Operator: South Eastern Railway
- Line: Asansol–Adra line
- Platforms: 2

Construction
- Structure type: Standard at ground
- Parking: No
- Cycle facilities: No

Other information
- Station code: RKI
- Division(s): Adra

History
- Opened: 1891
- Electrified: 1957–62
- Former names: Bengal Nagpur Railway
Services
Preceding station	Indian Railways	Following station
Muradi towards ?	South Eastern Railway zone Asansol–Adra section	Bero towards ?
Route map
Location
- Location within West Bengal Location within India

Ramkanali Junction railway station serves Ramkanali, Gobag, and surrounding areas in Purulia district in the Indian state of West Bengal. There is a freight line link to Par Beliya colliery.

== The railway station ==
Ramkanali railway station is located at an elevation of 157 metres (515 ft) above sea level. It was allotted the railway station code of RKI and is under the jurisdiction of Adra railway division of South Eastern Railway.

== History ==
The Bengal Nagpur Railway main line from Nagpur to Asansol, on the Howrah–Delhi main line, was opened for goods traffic on 1 February 1891.

== Electrification ==
The Tatanagar–Adra–Asansol section was electrified in the 1957–1962 period. The Asansol–Purulia sector was electrified in 1961–62. The freight link from Ramkanali to Chaurasi siding of Par Beliya colliery was electrified in 1963–64.
