= Neturia (community development block) =

- Community development block
- Location in West Bengal
- Coordinates: 23°39′47″N 86°49′37″E
- Country: India
- State: West Bengal
- District: Purulia
- Parliamentary constituency: Bankura
- Assembly constituency: Raghunathpur

Area
  - Total: 203.65 km^{2} (78.63 sq mi)
- Elevation: 139 m (456 ft)

Population (2011)
  - Total: 101,427
  - Density: 498.05/km^{2} (1,289.9/sq mi)

Languages
  - Official: Bengali, English
  - Additional official: Santali
- Time zone: UTC+5.30 (IST)
- PIN: 723142
- Telephone/STD code: 03251
- Vehicle registration: WB-55, WB-56
- Literacy Rate: 65.14 per cent
- Website: http://purulia.gov.in/

Neturia is a community development block (CD block) that forms an administrative division in the Raghunathpur subdivision of the Purulia district in the Indian state of West Bengal.

== History ==
=== Background ===
The Jaina Bhagavati-Sutra of the 5th century AD mentions that Purulia was one of the sixteen mahajanapadas and was a part of the kingdom known as Vajra-bhumi in ancient times. In 1833, the Manbhum district was carved out of the Jungle Mahals district, with headquarters at Manbazar. In 1838, the headquarters was transferred to Purulia. After independence, when Manbhum district was a part of Bihar, efforts were made to impose Hindi on the Bengali-speaking majority of the district and it led to the Bengali Language Movement (Manbhum). In 1956, the Manbhum district was partitioned between Bihar and West Bengal under the States Reorganization Act and the Bihar and West Bengal (Transfer of Territories) Act 1956.

== Geography ==
CD blocks in Purulia district

Neturia is located at 23°39′47″N 86°49′37″E.

The Neturia CD block is located in the north-western part of the district. The Damodar marks the northern boundary of the Neturia CD block. The Damodar Dwaraka upland is an extension of the Chota Nagpur Plateau. The area is undulating with hillocks of hard rocks.

The Neturia CD block is bounded by the Nirsa CD block, in the Dhanbad district of Jharkhand, and the Asansol Municipal Corporation, in the Paschim Bardhaman district, both across the Damodar River on the north, the Santuri CD block on the east, the Raghunathpur I CD block on the south and the Raghunathpur II CD block on the west.

The Neturia CD block has an area of 203.65 km^{2}. It has 1 panchayat samity, 7 gram panchayats, 73 gram sansads (village councils), 124 mouzas, 110 inhabited villages and 3 census towns. Neturia police station serves this block. Headquarters of this CD block are at Gobag, Ramkanali.

Gram panchayats in the Neturia CD block/panchayat samiti are: Bhamuria, Digha, Guniara, Janardandi, Raibandh, Saltore and Sarbari.

== Demographics ==
=== Population ===
According to the 2011 Census of India, the Neturia CD block had a total population of 101,427, of which 83,137 were rural and 18,290 were urban. There were 52,310 (52%) males and 49,117 (48%) females. There were 13,661 persons in the age range of 0 to 6 years. The Scheduled Castes numbered 29,275 (28.86%) and the Scheduled Tribes numbered 22,616 (22.30%).

According to the 2001 census, the Neturia CD block had a total population of 90,632, out of which 46,900 were males and 43,732 were females. The Neturia CD block registered a population growth of 10.24 per cent during the 1991-2001 decade. Decadal growth for the Purulia district was 13.96 per cent. Decadal growth in West Bengal was 17.84 per cent.

Census towns in the Neturia CD block are (2011 census figures in brackets): Saltore (5,094), Hijuli (7,917) and Par Beliya (5,279).

Large villages (with 4,000+ population) in the Neturia CD block are (2011 census figures in brackets): Sarbari (5,007).

Other villages in the Neturia CD block are (2011 census figures in brackets): Bhamaria (3,425), Nituria (1,144), Garh Panchkot (1,415), Digha (2,300), Gunyara (1,179) and Janardandi (686).

=== Literacy ===
According to the 2011 census, the total number of literate persons in the Neturia CD block was 57,174 (65.14% of the population over 6 years) out of which males numbered 35,092 (77.38% of the male population over 6 years) and females numbered 22,082 (52.06%) of the female population over 6 years). The gender disparity (the difference between female and male literacy rates) was 25.32%.

See also – List of West Bengal districts ranked by literacy rate

Literacy in CD blocks of
Purulia district
Purulia Sadar subdivision
Arsha – 57.48%
Balarampur – 60.40%
Hura – 68.79%
Purulia I – 78.37%
Purulia II – 63.39%
Manbazar subdivision
Barabazar – 63.27
Bandwan – 61.38%
Manbazar I – 63.78%
Manbazar II – 60.27%
Puncha – 68.14%
Jhalda subdivision
Baghmundi – 57.17%
Jhalda I – 66.18%
Jhalda II – 54.76%
Joypur – 57.94%
Raghunathpur subdivision
Para – 65.62%
Raghunathpur I – 67.36%
Raghunathpur II – 67.29%
Neturia – 65.14%
Santuri – 64.15%
Kashipur – 71.06%
2011 Census: CD Block Wise

Primary Census Abstract Data

=== Language and religion ===
Religion in Neturia CD block (2011)
Hinduism	85.40%
Islam	9.65%
Other (tribal religion)	4.31%
Other or not stated	0.64%

In the 2011 census Hindus numbered 86,614 and formed 85.40% of the population in Neturia CD Block. Muslims numbered 9,783 and formed 9.65% of the population. Others numbered 5,030 and formed 4.95% of the population. Others include Addi Bassi, Marang Boro, Santal, Saranath, Sari Dharma, Sarna, Alchchi, Bidin, Sant, Saevdharm, Seran, Saran, Sarin, Kheria, and other religious communities. In 2001, Hindus were 82.54%, Muslims 8.44% and tribal religions 8.54% of the population respectively.

Languages of Neturia CD block (2011)
1. Bengali (69.1%)
2. Santali (19.6%)
3. Hindi (8.66%)
4. Urdu (1.30%)
5. Others (1.35%)

At the time of the 2011 census, 69.11% of the population spoke Bengali, 19.58% Santali, 8.66% Hindi and 1.30% Urdu as their first language.

== Rural Poverty ==
According to the Rural Household Survey in 2005, 32.85% of total number of families were BPL families in Purulia district. According to a World Bank report, as of 2012, 31-38% of the population in Purulia, Murshidabad and Uttar Dinajpur districts were below poverty level, the highest among the districts of West Bengal, which had an average 20% of the population below poverty line.

== Economy ==
=== Livelihood ===
Livelihood
in Neturia CD block
1. Cultivators (15.2%)
2. Agricultural labourers (24.8%)
3. Household industries (2.90%)
4. Other Workers (57.1%)

In the Neturia CD block in 2011, among the class of total workers, cultivators numbered 5,655 and formed 15.17%, agricultural labourers numbered 9,242 and formed 24.79%, household industry workers numbered 1,080 and formed 2.90% and other workers numbered 21,297 and formed 57.14%. Total workers numbered 37,274 and formed 36.75% of the total population, and non-workers numbered 64,153 and formed 63.25% of the population.

Note: In the census records a person is considered a cultivator, if the person is engaged in cultivation/ supervision of land owned by self/government/institution. When a person who works on another person's land for wages in cash or kind or share, is regarded as an agricultural labourer. Household industry is defined as an industry conducted by one or more members of the family within the household or village, and one that does not qualify for registration as a factory under the Factories Act. Other workers are persons engaged in some economic activity other than cultivators, agricultural labourers and household workers. It includes factory, mining, plantation, transport and office workers, those engaged in business and commerce, teachers, entertainment artistes and so on.

=== Infrastructure ===
There are 110 inhabited villages in the Neturia CD block, as per the District Census Handbook, Puruliya, 2011, 100% villages have power supply. 107 villages (97.27%) have drinking water supply. 15 villages (13.64%) have post offices. 83 villages (75.45%) have telephones (including landlines, public call offices and mobile phones). 32 villages (29.09%) have pucca (paved) approach roads and 38 villages (34.55%) have transport communication (includes bus service, rail facility and navigable waterways). 2 villages (1.82%) have agricultural credit societies and 4 villages (3.64%) have banks.

=== Coal mining ===
Parbelia and other collieries are under the Sodepur Area (see details with map) of the Eastern Coalfields Ltd.

=== Industry ===
Industries in Neturia CD block are: Maithon Steel & Power at Bonra, Maa Chhinnamstika Steel & Power at Madandihi, Raghubeer Steel & Power Ltd. at Digha.

=== Agriculture ===
In 2013–14, persons engaged in agriculture in the Neturia CD block could be classified as follows: bargadars 0.62%, patta (document) holders 14.46%, small farmers (possessing land between 1 and 2 hectares) 6.34%, marginal farmers (possessing land up to 1 hectare) 42.04% and agricultural labourers 36.54%.

In 2013–14, the total area irrigated in the Neturia CD block was 3,805.83 hectares, out of which 3,303.99 hectares by tank water, 13.64 hectares by river lift irrigation, 116.20 hectares by open dug wells and 372.00 hectares by other means.

In 2013–14, Neturia CD block produced 3,218 tonnes of Aman paddy, the main winter crop, from 1,771 hectares. It also produced wheat, gram and mustard.

=== Banking ===
In 2013–14, the Neturia CD block had offices of 6 commercial banks and 1 gramin bank.

=== Backward Regions Grant Fund ===
The Purulia district is listed as a backward region and receives financial support from the Backward Regions Grant Fund. The fund, created by the Government of India, is designed to redress regional imbalances in development. As of 2012, 272 districts across the country were listed under this scheme. The list includes 11 districts of West Bengal.

== Transport ==
In 2013–14, the Neturia CD block had 2 ferry services and 4 originating/ terminating bus routes.

State Highway 5 running from Rupnarayanpur (in the Bardhaman district) to Junput (in the Purba Medinipur district) passes through this block.

== Education ==
In 2013–14, the Neturia CD block had 107 primary schools with 8,852 students, 19 middle schools with 1,146 students, 4 high schools with 1,305 students and 10 higher secondary schools with 9,118 students. Neturia CD Block had 1 general college with 1,627 students, 1 professional/ technical institute with 100 students and 221 institutions with 5,925 students for special and non-formal education.

See also – Education in India

According to the 2011 census, in Neturia CD block, amongst the 110 inhabited villages, 17 villages did not have a school, 13 villages had two or more primary schools, 23 villages had at least 1 primary and 1 middle school and 10 villages had at least 1 middle and 1 secondary school.

Panchakot Mahavidyalaya was established in 2001 at Sarbari.

== Healthcare ==
In 2014, the Neturia CD block had 1 rural hospital and 3 primary health centres, with total 48 beds and 6 doctors. 5,366 patients were treated indoor and 168,817 patients were treated outdoor in the hospitals, health centres and subcentres of the CD Block.

Harmadih Rural Hospital, with 30 beds at Harmadih, is the major government medical facility in the Neturia CD block. There are primary health centres at Bartoria (with 2 beds) and Gunara (with 10 beds).
