= Panchet Hill =

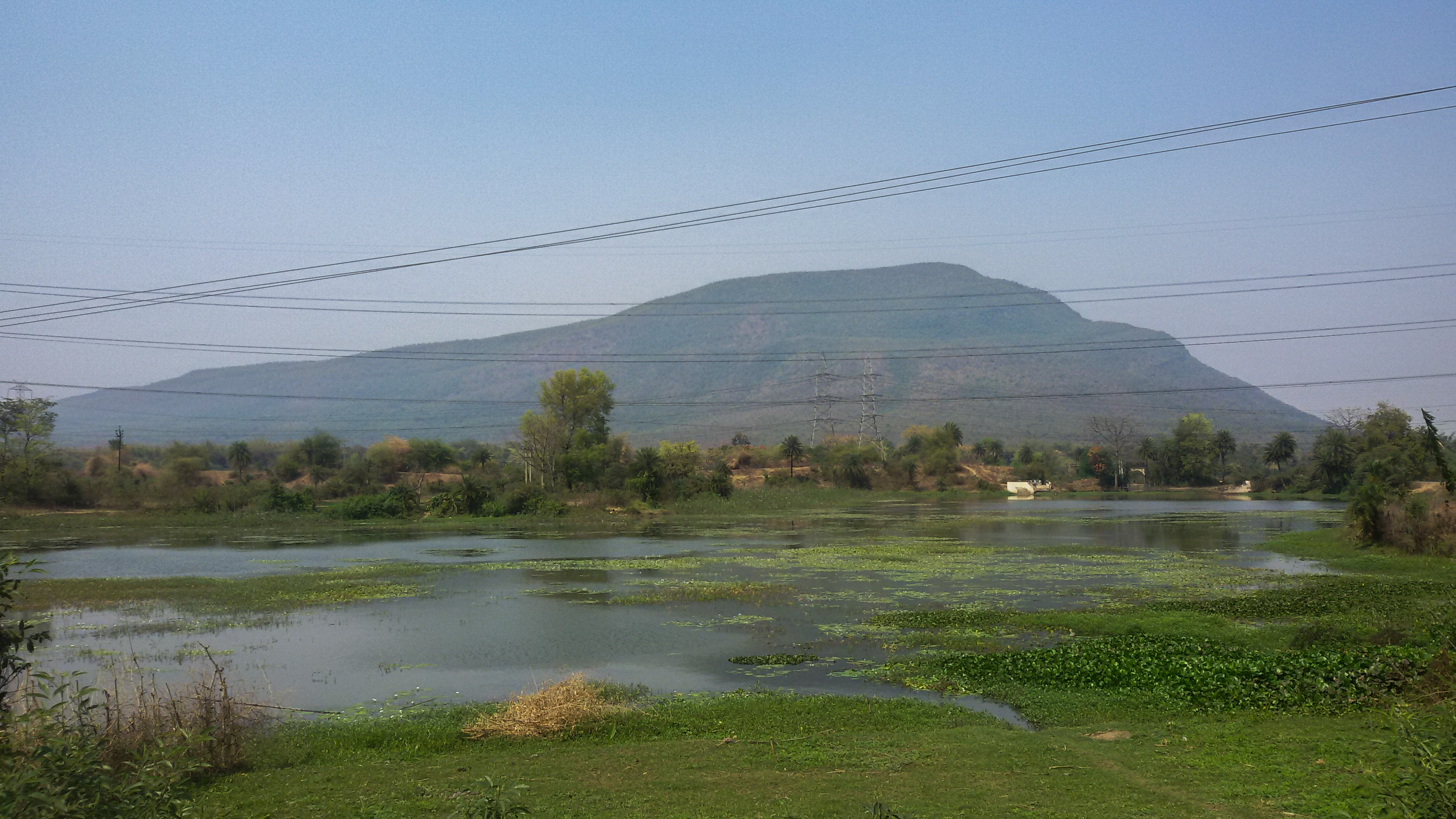
- Panchakot or Panchet Hill

Highest point
- Elevation: 490 m (1,610 ft)
- Coordinates: 23°37′N 86°47′E

Geography
- Location within West Bengal
- Location: Neturia CD Block, Purulia district, West Bengal, India
- Parent range: Chota Nagpur Plateau

Panchet Hill, referred to in Bengali as Panchakot Pahar, is located in Neturia (community development block) at the north-eastern end of Purulia district, in the Indian state of West Bengal.

== The hill ==
In 1911, H. Coupland had described the hill as follows: "Panchakot or Panchet (1,600 feet) is the most conspicuous object in the north-east of the district, some 35 miles north of Purulia. In shape it is a long crescent like ridge rising to its highest point at its eastern extremity: it is covered with small but dense jungle, with some fine clumps of mango and mahua scattered over the low foothills at its base. At the foot of the eastern face are the ruins of the old palace and fort of the Panchet Rajas, and above and also below them some ancient temples."

See also: Garh Panchkot

== Panchet Dam ==
Panchet Dam has been constructed across the Damodar at the foot of the Panchet Hill.
