= Parbelia =

- Census Town
- Location in West Bengal, India Parbelia (India)
- Coordinates: 23°40′26.4″N 86°49′8.4″E
- Country: India
- State: West Bengal
- District: Purulia

Population (2011)
  - Total: 5,279

Languages
  - Official: Bengali, English
- Time zone: UTC+5:30 (IST)
- ISO 3166 code: IN-WB
- Vehicle registration: WB
- Website: purulia.gov.in

Parbelia is a census town in the Neturia CD block in the Raghunathpur subdivision of the Purulia district in the Indian state of West Bengal.

== Geography ==
Places in Raghunathpur subdivision in Purulia district
M: municipal town, C: census town, R: rural/ urban centre, H: historical/ religious centre, T: tourist centre
Owing to space constraints in the small map, the actual locations in a larger map may vary slightly

=== Location ===
As per the map of Neturia CD block on page 309 of District Census Handbook, Puruliya. Saltore, Hijuli and Parbelia form a cluster of census towns.

=== Area overview ===
Purulia district forms the lowest step of the Chota Nagpur Plateau. The general scenario is undulating land with scattered hills. Raghunathpur subdivision occupies the northern part of the district. 83.80% of the population of the subdivision lives in rural areas. However, there are pockets of urbanization and 16.20% of the population lives in urban areas. There are 14 census towns in the subdivision. It is presented in the map given alongside. There is a coal mining area around Parbelia and two thermal power plants are there – the 500 MW Santaldih Thermal Power Station and the 1200 MW Raghunathpur Thermal Power Station. The subdivision has a rich heritage of old temples, some of them belonging to the 11th century or earlier. The Banda Deul is a monument of national importance. The comparatively more recent in historical terms, Panchkot Raj has interesting and intriguing remains in the area.

Note: The map alongside presents some of the notable locations in the subdivision. All places marked in the map are linked in the larger full screen map.

== Demographics ==
According to the 2011 Census of India Parbeliya had a total population of 5,279 of which 2,783 (53%) were males and 2,496 (47%) were females. There were 613 persons in the age range of 0–6 years. The total number of literate persons in Parbeliya was 3,462 (74.20% of the population over 6 years).

As of 2001 India census, Parbelia had a population of 6036. Males constitute 53% of the population and females 47%. Par Beliya has an average literacy rate of 59%, lower than the national average of 59.5%: male literacy is 69%, and female literacy is 48%. In Par Beliya, 14% of the population is under 6 years of age.

== Infrastructure ==
According to the District Census Handbook 2011, Puruliya, Parbeliya covered an area of 6.23 km^{2}. There is a railway station at Barakar, 8 km away. Among the civic amenities, the protected water supply involved hand pumps. It had 403 domestic electric connections. Among the medical facilities it had 4 dispensaries/ health centres, 1 maternity and child welfare centre. Among the educational facilities it had were 2 primary schools, 1 secondary school, 1 senior secondary school.

== Economy ==
=== Coal ===
This area of Purulia district is linked with Dishergarh in Asansol subdivision with a bridge across the Damodar River.

Collieries in the Sodepur Area of Eastern Coalfields are: Sodepur, Mouthdih, Parbelia, Dubeswari, Chinakuri I, Chinakuri II, Chinakuri III, Ranipur and Poidih. Out of these collieries Parbelia, Dubeswari and Ranipur are located in Purulia district, south of the Damodar River. There is a railway link from Ramkanali station on the Asansol-Adra line for colliery sidings.

== Transport ==
State Highway 5 (West Bengal) running from Rupnarayanpur (in Bardhaman district) to Junput (in Purba Medinipur district) passes through Par Beliya.

== Education ==
Panchakot Mahavidyalaya was established in 2001 at Sarbari.

Parbelia Colliery Hindi Higher Secondary School is a Hindi-medium institution established in 1945. It has facilities for teaching from class V to class XII.

Parbelia Colliery High School is a Bengali-medium coeducational institution established in 1964. It has facilities for teaching from class V to class XII.

== See also ==
- Dishergarh
- Mugma
