= Garh Panchkot =

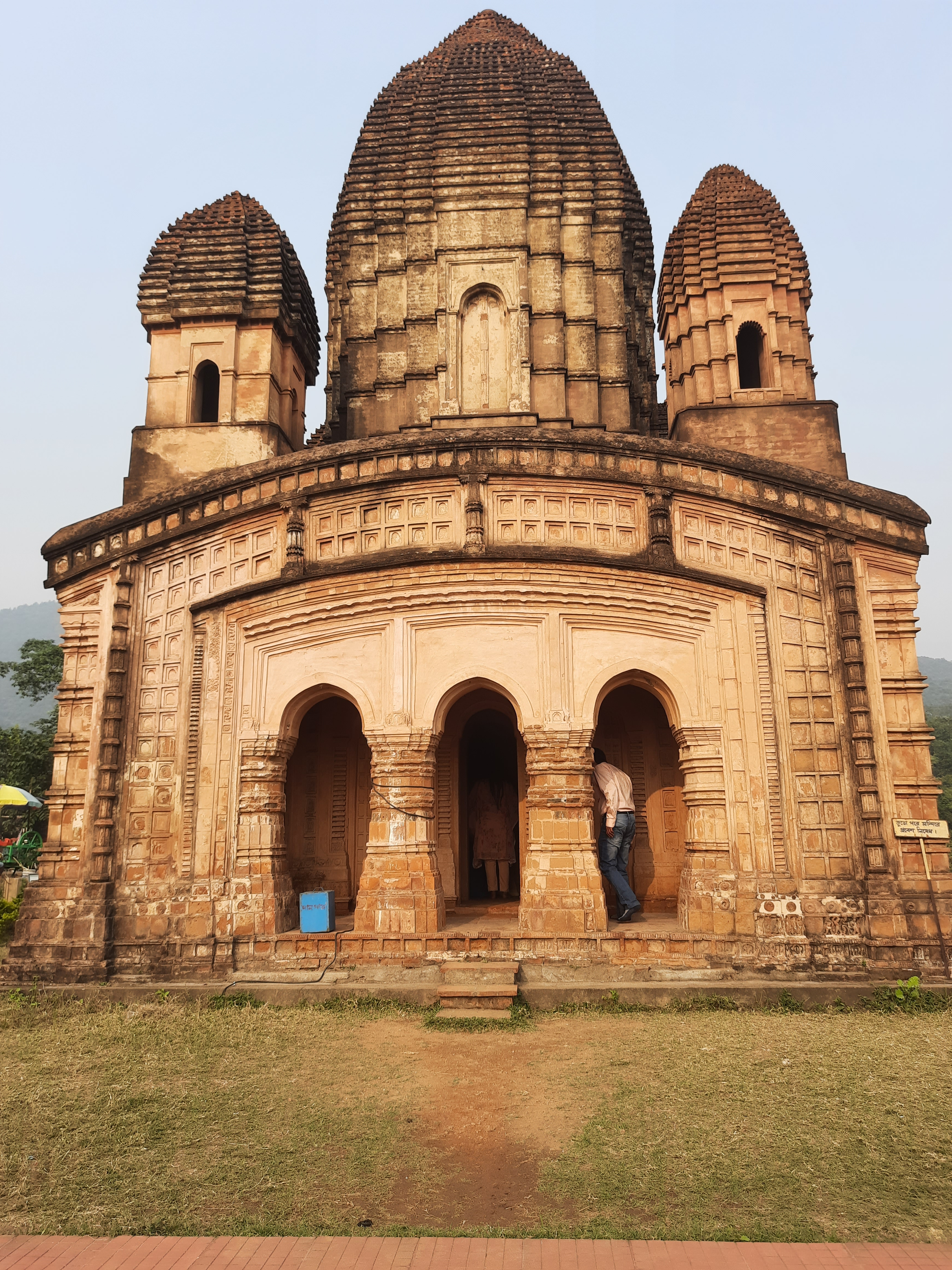
- Garh Panchkot Ras Mandir

- Location in West Bengal, India
- 23.6°N 86.76667°E
- Location: India

Site notes
- Area: Purulia District, West Bengal

Garh Panchkot, meaning "Fort of the Five Clans", is a ruined fort located in the eastern part of India at the foothills of Panchet Hill in the district of Purulia, West Bengal.

== Location ==
Garh Panchkot is located at 23.6°N 86.8°E.

Note: The map alongside presents some of the notable locations in the subdivision. All places marked in the map are linked in the larger full screen map.

Places in Raghunathpur subdivision in Purulia district
M: municipal town, CT: census town, R: rural/ urban centre, H: historical/ religious centre, T: tourist centre
Owing to space constraints in the small map, the actual locations in a larger map may vary slightly

== Gallery ==
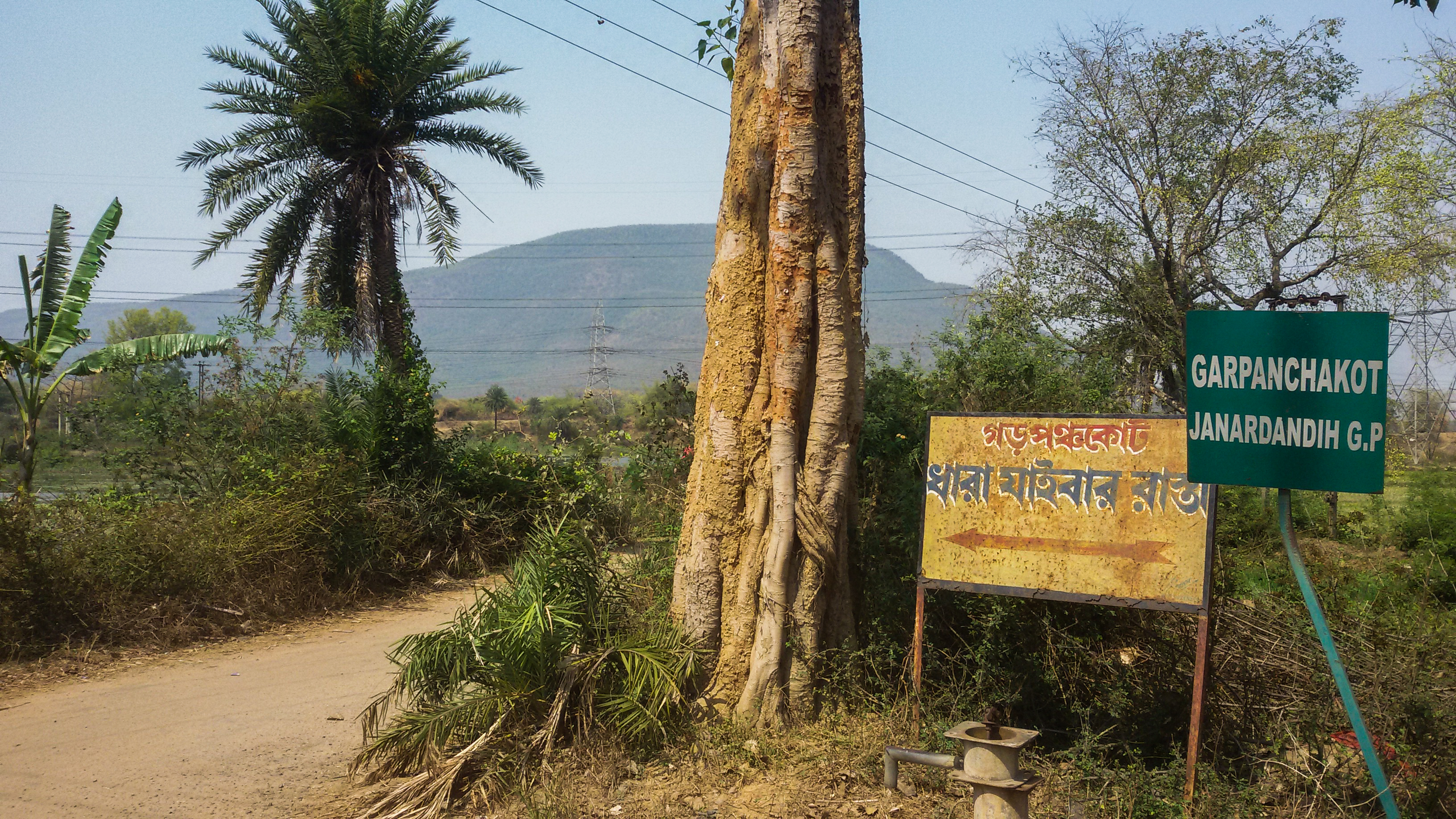

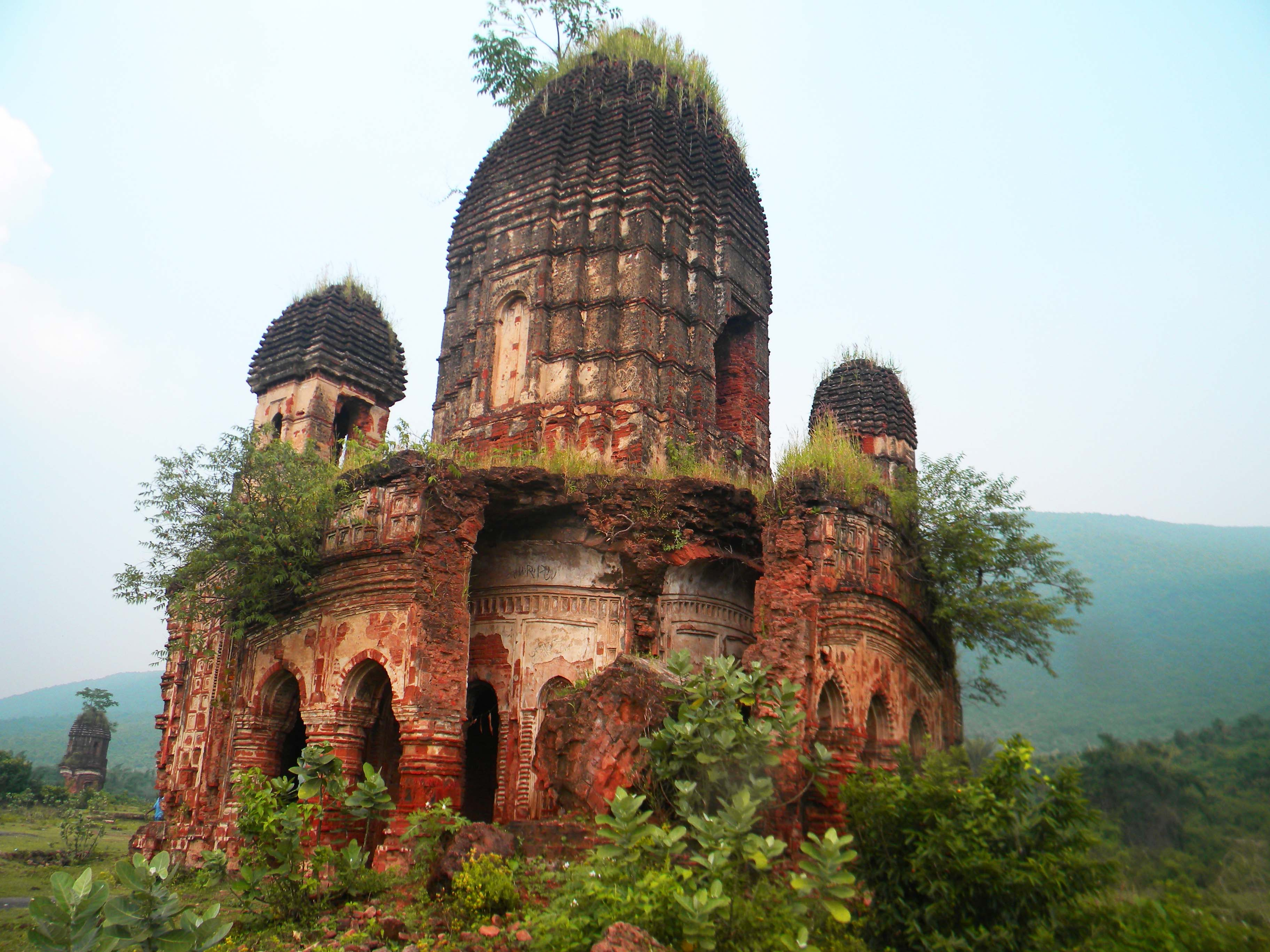

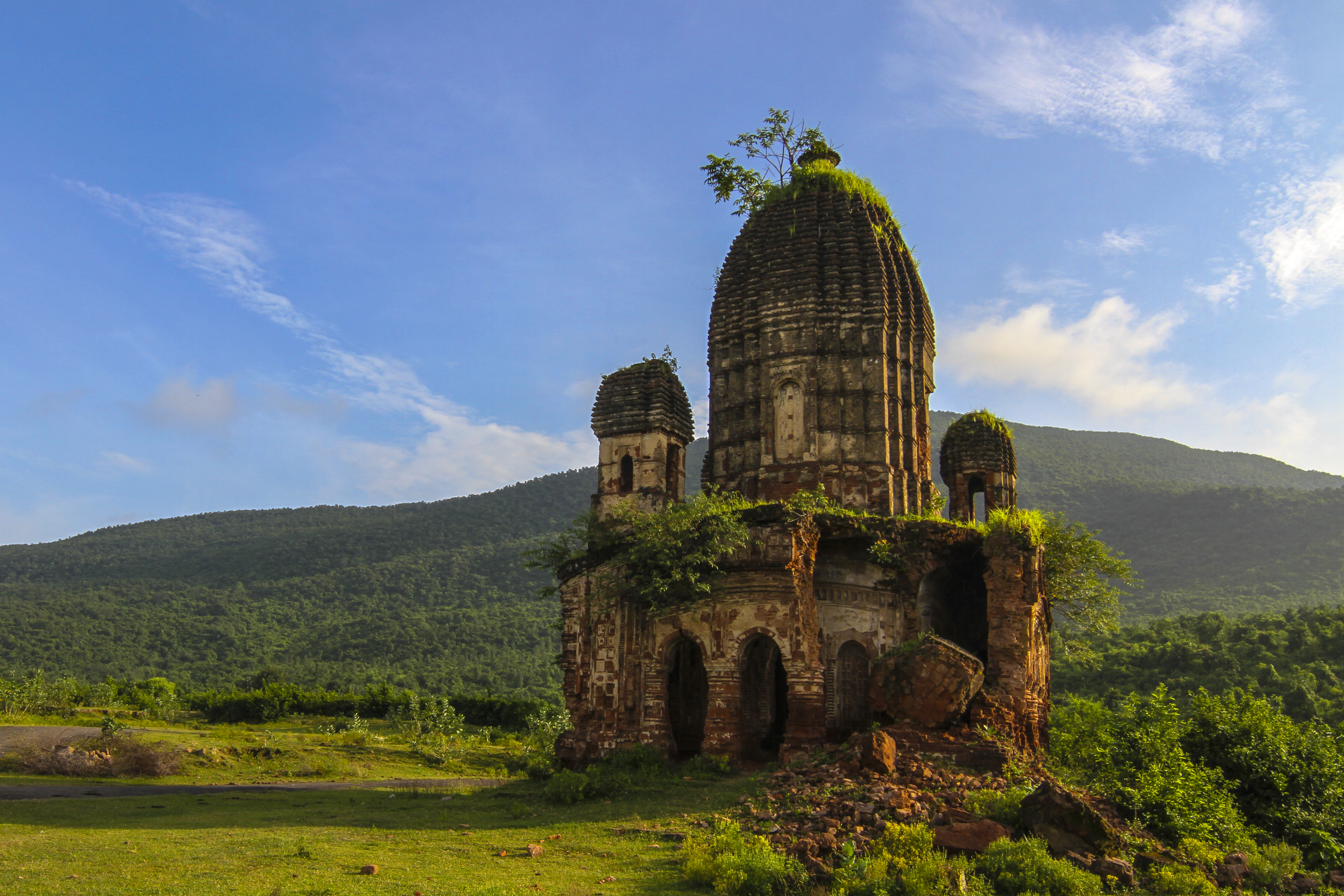

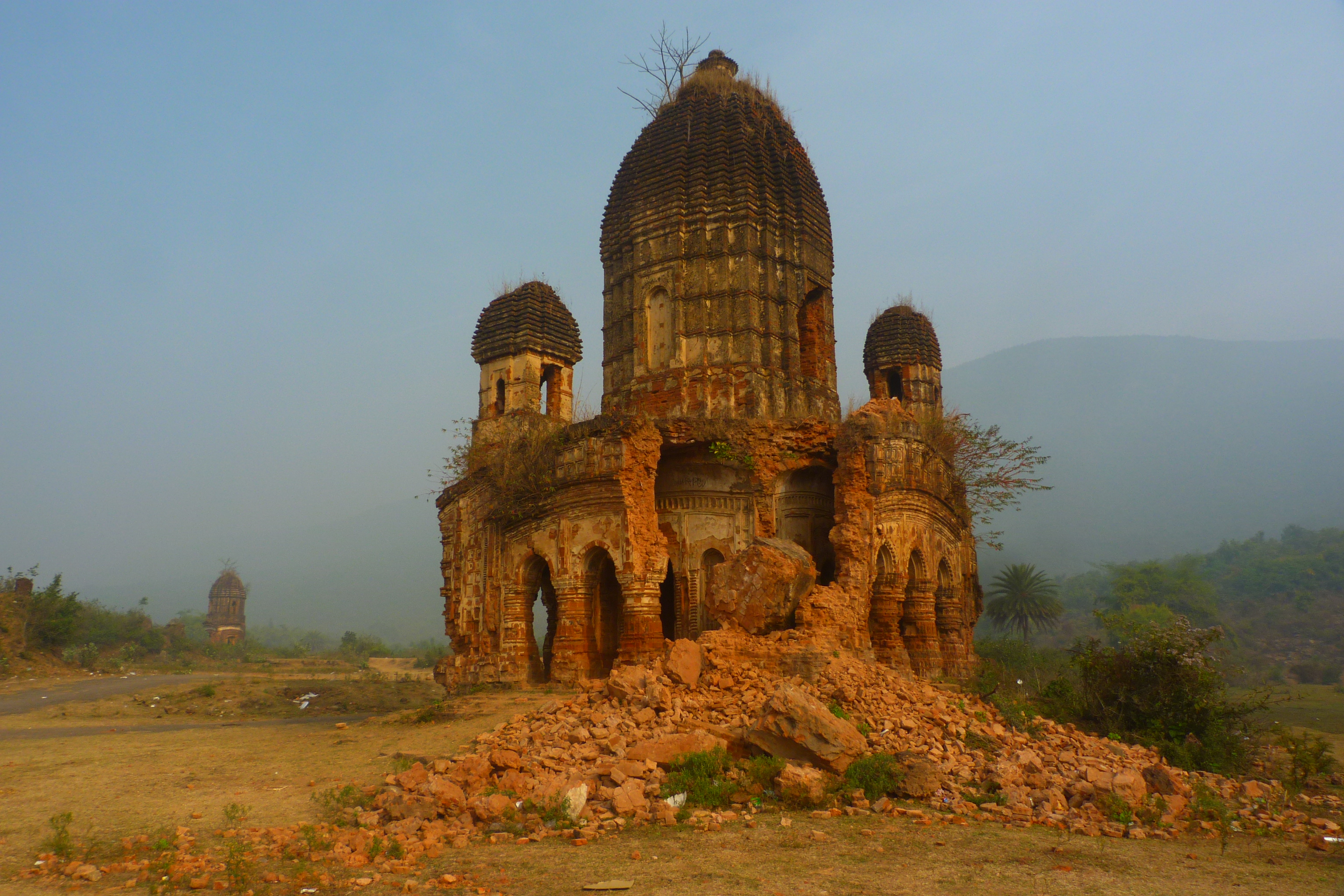

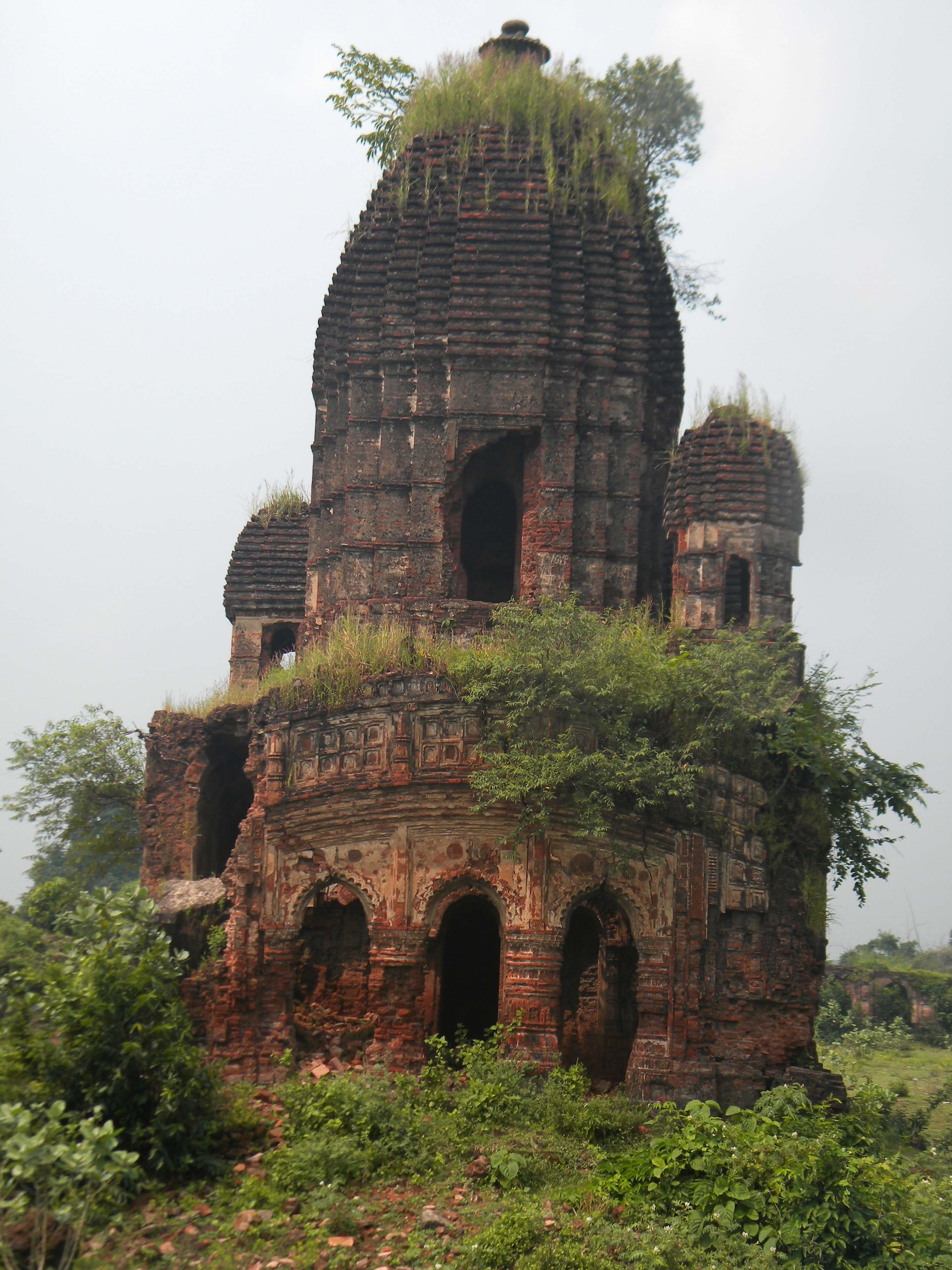

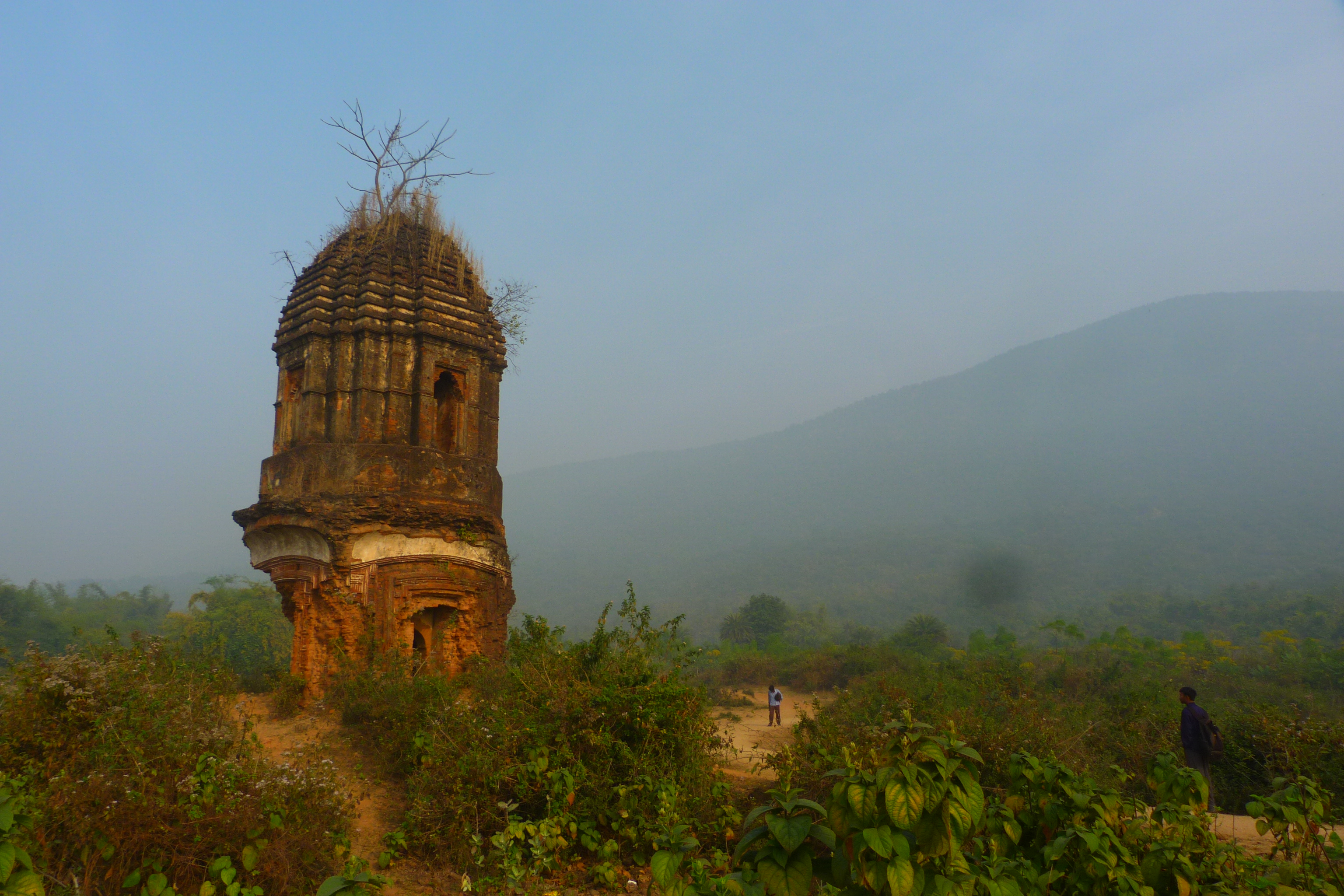

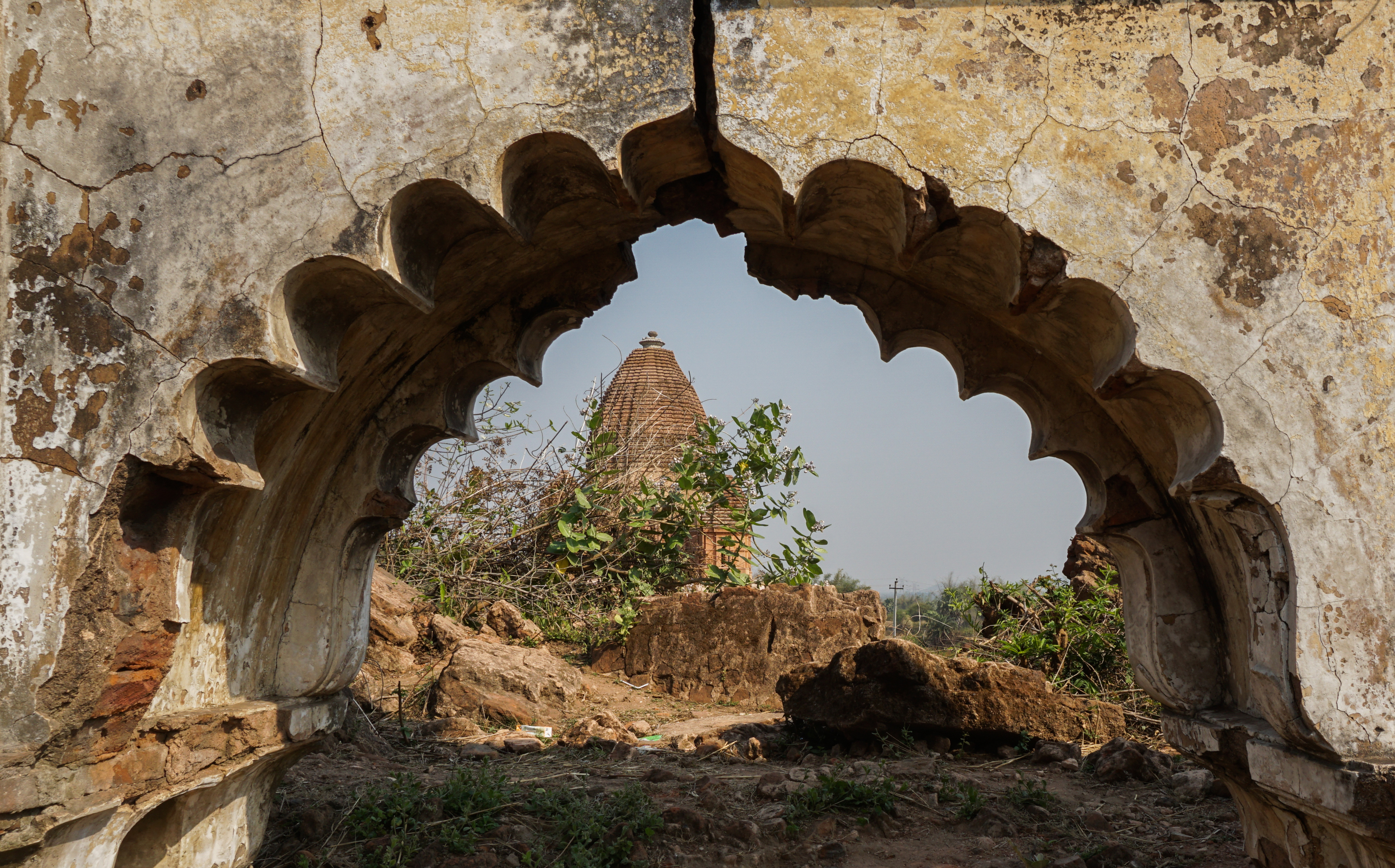

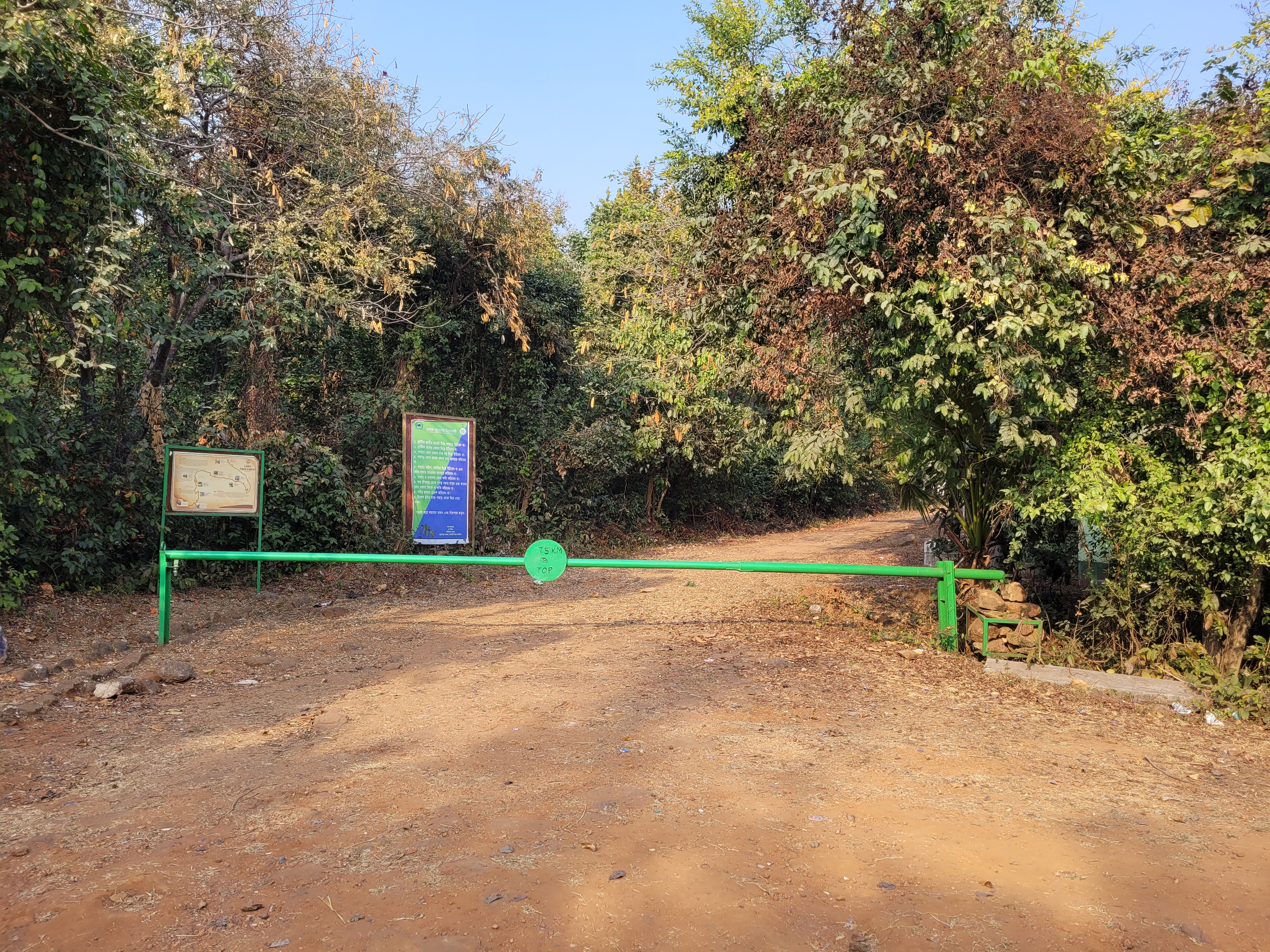
