= Raghunathpur Thermal Power Station =

Thermal power station of India

Raghunathpur Thermal Power Station is a 1200 MW coal-based thermal power plant located at Raghunathpur in Purulia district in the Indian state of West Bengal.

The power station was proposed by Damodar Valley Corporation and would comprise two 600 MW units slated to be commissioned in 2013.

In March 2014 it was reported that "the first phase was supposed to become operational in November 2010. However, because of major issues such as non-availability of land, water and rail connectivity, the project has been delayed," an official said.

Unit 1 was commissioned in August 2014.Unit 2 was commissioned in January 2016. However, the two units did not enter commercial operation until March 2016.

== Capacity ==
It has a planned capacity of 2520 MW. It has two Phases. Phase-I (1200 MW)+Phase-II (1320 MW)

Unit No.	Generating Capacity	Commissioned on	Status
1	600 MW	27 March 2016	(Commercial operation 27 MAR 2016)
2	600 MW		Full Load achieved 2016
