= Santaldih Thermal Power Station =

Thermal power station in West Bengal, India

Santaldih Thermal Power Station(Power sector)
- Country: India
- Location: Para (community development block), Purulia district, West Bengal
- Coordinates: 23°36′05″N 86°28′01″E
- Status: Operational
- Commission date: 1 January 1974
- Owner: West Bengal Power Development Corporation Limited

Thermal power station
- Primary fuel: Coal

Power generation
- Units operational: 2x 250 MW
- Nameplate capacity: 500 MW; 800x2 MW (planned)

Santaldih Thermal Power Station (Bengali: সাঁওতালডিহ তাপবিদ্যুৎ কেন্দ্র) of West Bengal Power Development Corporation Limited is a power station with an installed capacity of 500 MW (2x250 MW).

== Location ==
Santaldih Thermal Power Station is located at 23°35′53″N 86°28′26″E, at Santaldih, in Para (community development block) of Purulia district in the Indian state of West Bengal. It is located on the Adra-Gomoh branch line of South-Eastern Railway, on the southern bank of Damodar River. There is a railway station at Santaldih on the Adra-Gomoh branch line.

== Capacity ==
The installed capacity of Santaldih Thermal Power Station is 2 x 250 MW. The four units were commissioned as follows- Unit 1: 1.1.1974; Unit 2: 16.7.1975; Unit 3: 6.12.1978; Unit 4: 30.3.1981. STPS has expanded capacity by 2 x 250 MW . The previous units (1,2,3,4) are non functional now and they are demolished. Unit 5 & 6 are operating now both are 250 MW. Unit 7 & 8 are proposed to be installed in future. Unit 7 & 8 will be super critical of 800 MW each.
