= Shankara, Purulia =

Shankara
- Census Town
- Location in West Bengal, India Shankara (India)
- Coordinates: 23.4824°N 86.5258°E
- Country: India
- State: West Bengal
- District: Purulia

Area
  - Total: 5.3831 km^{2} (2.0784 sq mi)

Population (2011)
  - Total: 11,171
  - Density: 2,075.2/km^{2} (5,374.7/sq mi)

Languages
  - Official: Bengali, English
- Time zone: UTC+5:30 (IST)
- PIN: 723155
- Telephone/STD code: 03251
- Lok Sabha constituency: Purulia
- Vidhan Sabha constituency: Para
- Website: purulia.gov.in

Shankara (also spelled Shankra, Sankra) is a census town and a gram panchayat in the Para CD block in the Raghunathpur subdivision of the Purulia district in the state of West Bengal, India.

== Geography ==
Places in Raghunathpur subdivision in Purulia district
M: municipal town, CT: census town, R: rural/ urban centre, H: historical/ religious centre, T: tourist centre
Owing to space constraints in the small map, the actual locations in a larger map may vary slightly

=== Location ===
Shankara is located at 23.4824°N 86.5258°E.

=== Area overview ===
Purulia district forms the lowest step of the Chota Nagpur Plateau. The general scenario is undulating land with scattered hills. Raghunathpur subdivision occupies the northern part of the district. 83.80% of the population of the subdivision lives in rural areas. However, there are pockets of urbanization and 16.20% of the population lives in urban areas. There are 14 census towns in the subdivision. It is presented in the map given alongside. There is a coal mining area around Parbelia and two thermal power plants are there – the 500 MW Santaldih Thermal Power Station and the 1200 MW Raghunathpur Thermal Power Station. The subdivision has a rich heritage of old temples, some of them belonging to the 11th century or earlier. The Banda Deul is a monument of national importance. The comparatively more recent in historical terms, Panchkot Raj has interesting and intriguing remains in the area.

Note: The map alongside presents some of the notable locations in the subdivision. All places marked in the map are linked in the larger full screen map.

== Demographics ==
According to the 2011 Census of India, Shankara had a total population of 11,171, of which 5,735 (51%) were males and 5,436 (49%) were females. There were 2,523 persons in the age range of 0–6 years. The total number of literate persons in Shankara was 3,520 (40.84% of the population over 6 years).

== Infrastructure ==
According to the District Census Handbook 2011, Puruliya, Shankara covered an area of 5.3831 km^{2}. There is a railway station at Anara, 5 km away. Among the civic amenities, it had 23 km roads with both open and closed drains, the protected water supply involved overhead tank, tap water from untreated source, uncovered well. It had 887 domestic electric connections. Among the medical facilities it had 1 hospital, 1 dispensary/ health centre, 2 medicine shops. Among the educational facilities it had were 2 primary schools, 1 middle school, the nearest secondary school at Jhapur 3 km away, the nearest senior secondary school at Khapur 3 km away, the nearest general degree college at Raghunathpur 19 km away. Among the important commodities it manufactured was beedi.

== Transport ==
The railway station at Anara, on the Adra-Gomoh branch line, is located nearby.

== Education ==
Sankra High School is a Bengali-medium coeducational institution established in 1973. It has facilities for teaching up to the higher secondary level.

Jhapra High School is a Bengali-medium coeducational institution established in 1966. It has facilities for teaching up to the higher secondary level.

== Culture ==
Ancient idols of Jain tirthakars Parshvanath and Shantinatha have been found at Shankara. Many age-old idols that have weathered with time are stored inside modern temples.

Banda Deul, located nearby, an 11th-century temple, is a monument of national importance.

There are some protected monuments at Para, under the Government of West Bengal . There is an 11th-century rekha deul at Banda.

Numerous statues related to Jainism and Hinduism have been found at Haraktor.

== Shankara picture gallery ==
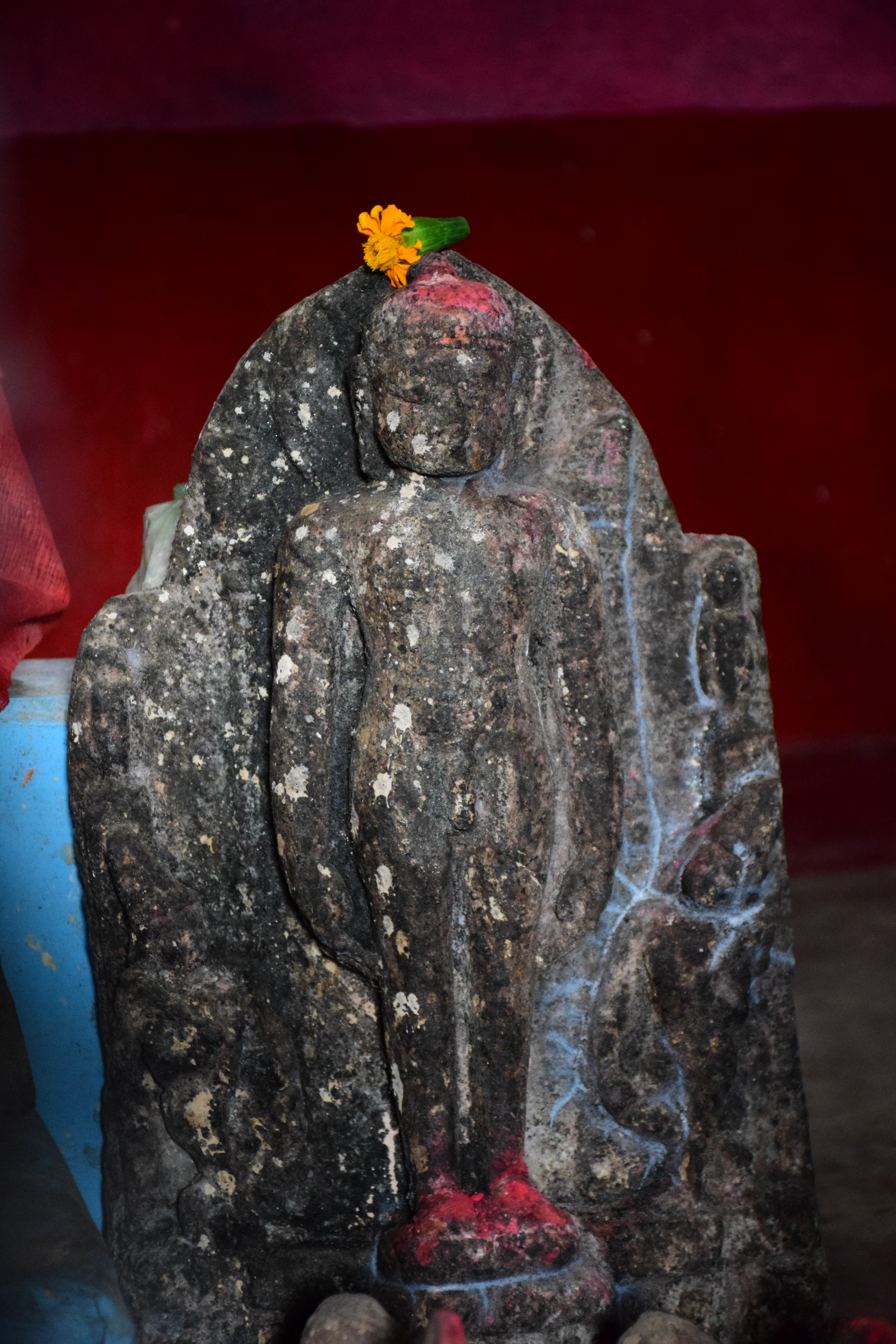
Jain idol in Dharmaraj temple

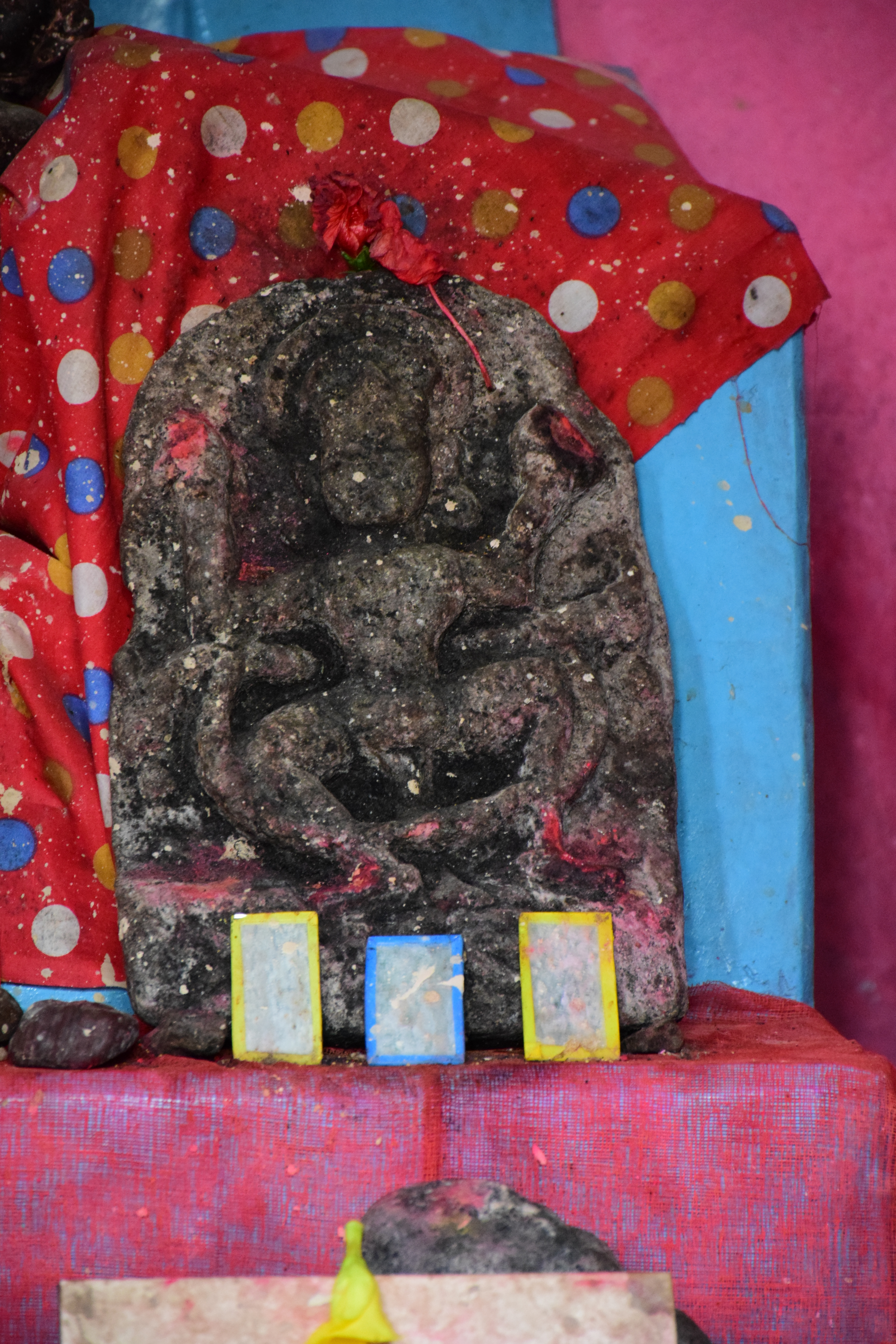
Jain idol in Dharmaraj temple

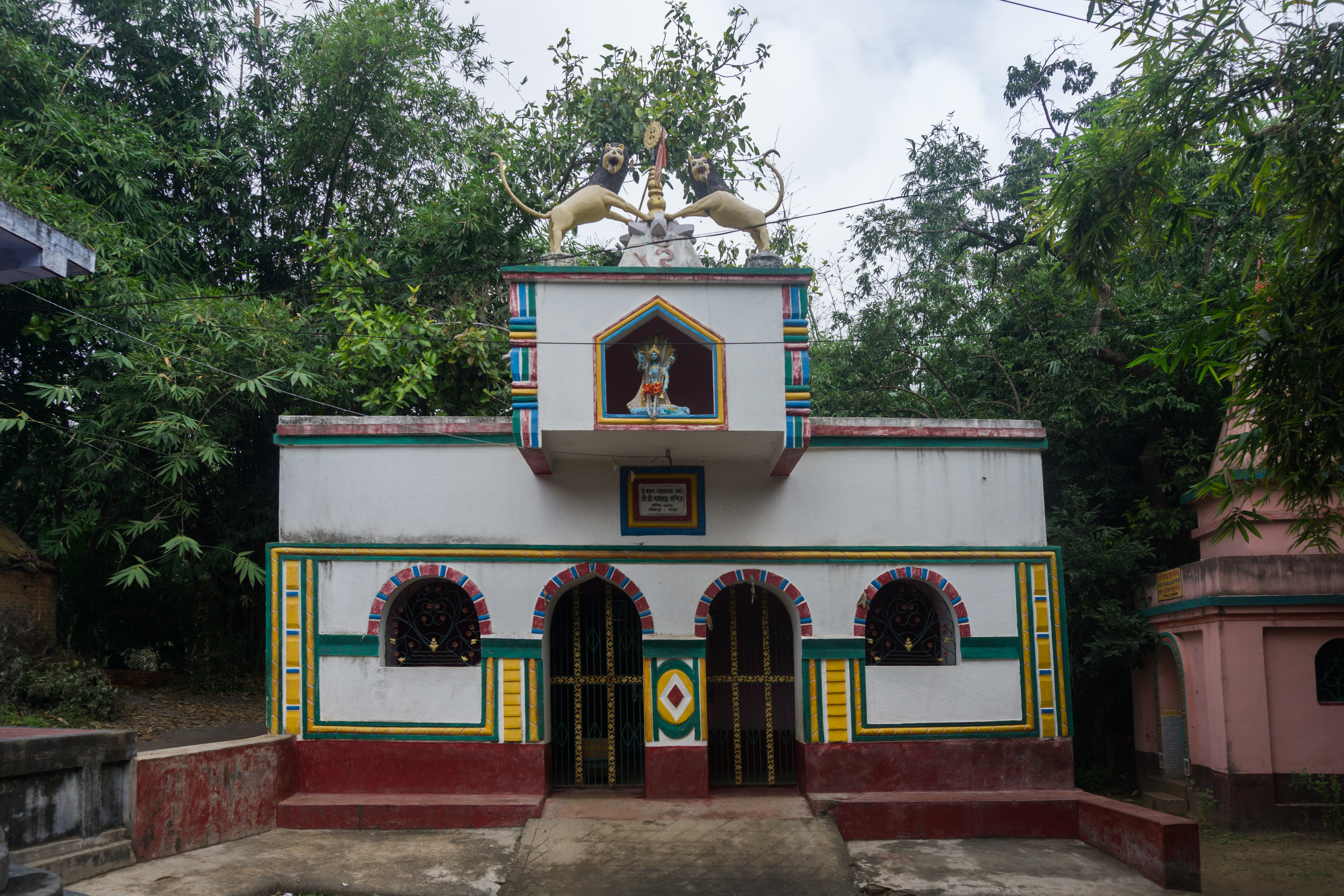
Dharmaraj temple

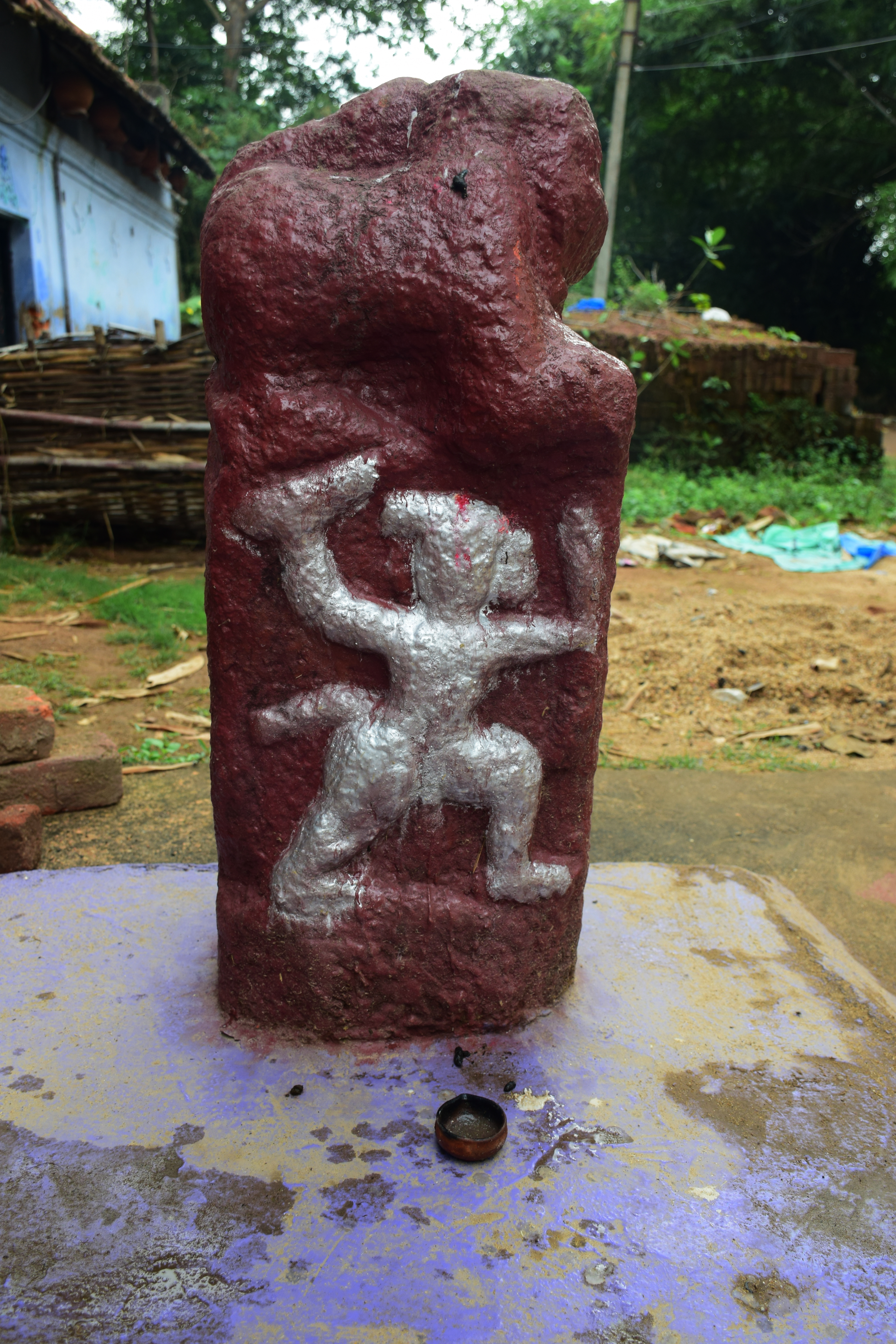
Bir stambha

== Healthcare ==
Para Block Primary Health Centre, with 30 beds, at Para, is a major government medical facility in the Para CD block.
