= Dubra, Purulia =

Dubra
- Census Town
- Location in West Bengal, India Dubra (India)
- Coordinates: 23.5474°N 86.5182°E
- Country: India
- State: West Bengal
- District: Purulia

Area
  - Total: 3.1268 km^{2} (1.2073 sq mi)

Population (2011)
  - Total: 5,506
  - Density: 1,761/km^{2} (4,561/sq mi)

Languages
  - Official: Bengali, English
- Time zone: UTC+5:30 (IST)
- PIN: 723155
- Telephone/STD code: 03251
- Lok Sabha constituency: Purulia
- Vidhan Sabha constituency: Para
- Website: purulia.gov.in

Dubra is a census town and a gram panchayat in the Para CD block in the Raghunathpur subdivision of the Purulia district in the state of West Bengal, India.

== Geography ==
Places in Raghunathpur subdivision in Purulia district
M: municipal town, CT: census town, R: rural/ urban centre, H: historical/ religious centre, T: tourist centre
Owing to space constraints in the small map, the actual locations in a larger map may vary slightly

=== Location ===
Dubra is located at 23.5474°N 86.5182°E.

=== Area overview ===
Purulia district forms the lowest step of the Chota Nagpur Plateau. The general scenario is undulating land with scattered hills. Raghunathpur subdivision occupies the northern part of the district. 83.80% of the population of the subdivision lives in rural areas. However, there are pockets of urbanization and 16.20% of the population lives in urban areas. There are 14 census towns in the subdivision. It is presented in the map given alongside. There is a coal mining area around Parbelia and two thermal power plants are there – the 500 MW Santaldih Thermal Power Station and the 1200 MW Raghunathpur Thermal Power Station. The subdivision has a rich heritage of old temples, some of them belonging to the 11th century or earlier. The Banda Deul is a monument of national importance. The comparatively more recent in historical terms, Panchkot Raj has interesting and intriguing remains in the area.

Note: The map alongside presents some of the notable locations in the subdivision. All places marked in the map are linked in the larger full screen map.

== Demographics ==
According to the 2011 Census of India, Dubra had a total population of 5,506, of which 2,866 (52%) were males and 2,640 (48%) were females. There were 745 persons in the age range of 0–6 years. The total number of literate persons in Dubra was 3,450 (72.46% of the population over 6 years).

== Infrastructure ==
According to the District Census Handbook 2011, Puruliya, Dubra covered an area of 3.1268 km^{2}. There is a railway station at Rukni, 5 km away. Among the civic amenities, it had 11 km roads with both open and closed drains, the protected water supply involved overhead tank, hand pump, uncovered well. It had 582 domestic electric connections. Among the medical facilities it had 1 dispensary/ health centre, 1 family welfare centre, 1 maternity and child welfare centre, 3 medicine shops. Among the educational facilities it had were 1 primary school, 1 middle school, 1 secondary school, 1 senior secondary school, the nearest general degree college at Raghunathpur 20 km away. It had 1 non-formal education centre (Sarvya Siksha Abhiyan centre). Among the important products it manufactured were soft cocks and leather products. It had the branch of 1 nationalised bank.

== Transport ==
The railway station at Rukni, on the Adra-Gomoh branch line is located nearby.

== Education ==
Santaldih College was established in 2008 at Usir, PO Chatarmahul.

Dubra High School is a Bengali-medium coeducational school established in 1956. It has arrangements for teaching from class V to class XII.

== Culture ==
Banda Deul, located nearby, an 11th-century temple, is a monument of national importance.

There are some protected monuments at Para, under the Government of West Bengal .

Numerous statues related to Jainism and Hinduism have been found at Haraktor.

== Healthcare ==
Para Block Primary Health Centre, with 30 beds, at Para, is a major government medical facility in the Para CD block.
