= Chapari =

- Census Town
- Location in West Bengal, India Chapari (India)
- Coordinates: 23°29′52.8″N 86°33′43.2″E
- Country: India
- State: West Bengal
- District: Puruliya

Population (2011)
  - Total: 6,556

Languages
  - Official: Bengali, English
- Time zone: UTC+5:30 (IST)
- ISO 3166 code: IN-WB
- Vehicle registration: WB 81 & WB 82
- Website: purulia.gov.in

Chapari is a census town in the Para CD block in the Raghunathpur subdivision of the Puruliya district in the state of West Bengal, India.

== History ==
The Jaina Bhagavati-Sutra of 5th century AD mentions that Purulia was one of the sixteen mahajanapadas and was a part of the Vejra-bhumi kingdom. In 1833, the Manbhum district was carved out of Jungle Mahals district, with headquarters at Manbazar.

== Geography ==
Places in Raghunathpur subdivision in Purulia district
M: municipal town, CT: census town, R: rural/ urban centre, H: historical/ religious centre, T: tourist centre
Owing to space constraints in the small map, the actual locations in a larger map may vary slightly

=== Area overview ===
Purulia district forms the lowest step of the Chota Nagpur Plateau. The general scenario is undulating land with scattered hills. Raghunathpur subdivision occupies the northern part of the district. 83.80% of the population of the subdivision lives in rural areas. However, there are pockets of urbanization and 16.20% of the population lives in urban areas. There are 14 census towns in the subdivision. It is presented in the map given alongside. There is a coal mining area around Parbelia and two thermal power plants are there – the 500 MW Santaldih Thermal Power Station and the 1200 MW Raghunathpur Thermal Power Station. The subdivision has a rich heritage of old temples, some of them belonging to the 11th century or earlier. The Banda Deul is a monument of national importance. The comparatively more recent in historical terms, Panchkot Raj has interesting and intriguing remains in the area.

Note: The map alongside presents some of the notable locations in the subdivision. All places marked in the map are linked in the larger full screen map.

== Demographics ==
According to the 2011 Census of India Chapari had a total population of 6,556 of which 3,381 (52%) were males and 3,175 (48%) were females. There were 678 persons in the age range of 0–6 years. The total number of literate persons in Chapari was 5,121 (87.12% of the population over 6 years).

As of 2001 India census, Chapari had a population of 7242. Males constitute 53% of the population and females 47%. Chapari has an average literacy rate of 77%, higher than the national average of 59.5%; with male literacy of 84% and female literacy of 69%. 11% of the population is under 6 years of age.

== Infrastructure ==
According to the District Census Handbook 2011, Puruliya, Chapari covered an area of 2.87 km^{2}. There is a railway station at Anara, 4 km away. Among the civic amenities, it had 7 km roads with both open and closed drains, the protected water supply involved overhead tank, tap water from untreated source, uncovered well. It had 1,838 domestic electric connections and 176 road lighting points. Among the medical facilities it had 2 dispensaries/ health centres, 2 family welfare centres, 2 maternity and child welfare centres. Among the educational facilities it had were 2 primary schools, the nearest middle school, the nearest secondary school, the nearest senior secondary school, at Anara 3 km away, the nearest general degree college at Raghunathpur 13 km away. It had 1 special school for disabled. It had the branch of 1 nationalised bank and 1 private commercial bank.

== Transport ==
There is a station at Anara on the Adra-Purulia sector of the Asansol-Tatanagar-Kharagpur line of the South Eastern Railway.

== Education ==
Raghunathpur College was established in 1961 at Raghunathpur.

Anara South Eastern Railway Colony High School is a Bengali-medium boys only institution established in 1957. It has facilities for teaching from class V to class XII.

Anara Girls High School is a Bengali-medium girls only institution established in 1962. It has facilities for teaching from class V to class XII.

== Culture ==
Banda Deul, located nearby, an 11th century temple, is a monument of national importance.

There are some protected monuments at Para, under the Government of West Bengal.
