= Hura (community development block) =

- Community development block
- post office in hura

- Coordinates: 23.30°N 86.65°E
- Country: India
- State: West Bengal
- District: Purulia

Government
  - Type: Representative democracy

Area
  - Total: 382.21 km^{2} (147.57 sq mi)
- Elevation: 167 m (548 ft)

Population (2011)
  - Total: 143,575
  - Density: 375.64/km^{2} (972.91/sq mi)

Languages
  - Official: Bengali, Santali, English
- Time zone: UTC+5:30 (IST)
- PIN: 723130 (Hura)
- Telephone/STD code: 03251
- Vehicle registration: WB-55, WB-56
- Literacy: 68.79%
- Lok Sabha constituency: Purulia
- Vidhan Sabha constituency: Manbazar, Kashipur
- Website: purulia.gov.in

Hura is a community development block (CD block) that forms an administrative division in the Purulia Sadar subdivision of the Purulia district in the Indian state of West Bengal.

== History ==
=== Background ===
The Jaina Bhagavati-Sutra of the 5th century AD mentions that Purulia was one of the sixteen mahajanapadas and was a part of the kingdom known as Vajra-bhumi in ancient times. In 1833, Manbhum district was carved out of the Jungle Mahals district, with headquarters at Manbazar. In 1838, the headquarters was transferred to Purulia. After independence, when Manbhum district was a part of Bihar, efforts were made to impose Hindi on the Bengali-speaking majority of the district and it led to the Bengali Language Movement (Manbhum). In 1956, the Manbhum district was partitioned between Bihar and West Bengal under the States Reorganization Act and the Bihar and West Bengal (Transfer of Territories) Act 1956.

== Geography ==
CD blocks in Purulia district

Hura is located at 23°18′N 86°39′E.

The Hura CD block is located in the eastern part of the district. The Kangsabati River forms the boundary between the Hura and Puncha CD blocks. The lower Kangsabati basin has degraded lowlands.

The Hura CD block is bounded by the Kashipur and Para CD blocks on the north, the Indpur and Hirbandh CD blocks, in the Bankura district, on the east, the Puncha CD block on the south, and the Purulia I CD block on the west.

The Hura CD block has an area of 382.21 km^{2}. It has 1 panchayat samity, 10 gram panchayats, 107 gram sansads (village councils), 116 mouzas and 111 inhabited villages. Hura police station serves this block. Headquarters of this CD block are at Hura.

Gram panchayats of the Hura CD block/panchayat samiti are: Chatumadar, Daldali, Hura, Jabarrah, Kalabani, Keshargarh, Ladhurka, Lakhanpur, Manguria-Lalpur and Rakhera-Bishpuria.

== Demographics ==
=== Population ===
According to the 2011 Census of India the Hura CD block had a total population of 143,575, all of which were rural. There were 72,867 (51%) males and 70,708 (49%) females. There were 18,467 persons in the age range of 0 to 6 years. The Scheduled Castes numbered 28,087 (19.56%) and the Scheduled Tribes numbered 36,561 (25.46%).

According to the 2001 census, the Hura block had a total population of 127,423, out of which 64,462 were males and 62,961 were females. The Hura CD block registered a population growth of 12.04 per cent during the 1991-2001 decade. Decadal growth for the Purulia district was 13.96 per cent. Decadal growth in West Bengal was 17.84 per cent.

Large villages (with 4,000+ population) in the Hura CD Block are (2011 census figures in brackets): Kalabani (5,698), Manguralalpur (6,683), Daldali (4,488), Kesargarh (4,626) and Parsia (4,075).

Other villages in the Hura CD Block are (2011 census figures in brackets): Hura (3,419), Rakshyara (2,387), Bishpuria (3,661), Chatumatar (1,842), Jabra (2,073), Ladhurka (3,652) and Lakshanpur (2,973).

=== Literacy ===
According to the 2011 census the total number of literate persons in the Hura CD block was 86,067 (68.79% of the population over 6 years) out of which males numbered 51,971 (81.95% of the male population over 6 years) and females numbered 34,096 (55.27%) of the female population over 6 years). The gender disparity (the difference between female and male literacy rates) was 26.68%.

See also – List of West Bengal districts ranked by literacy rate

Literacy in CD blocks of
Purulia district
Purulia Sadar subdivision
Arsha – 57.48%
Balarampur – 60.40%
Hura – 68.79%
Purulia I – 78.37%
Purulia II – 63.39%
Manbazar subdivision
Barabazar – 63.27
Bandwan – 61.38%
Manbazar I – 63.78%
Manbazar II – 60.27%
Puncha – 68.14%
Jhalda subdivision
Baghmundi – 57.17%
Jhalda I – 66.18%
Jhalda II – 54.76%
Joypur – 57.94%
Raghunathpur subdivision
Para – 65.62%
Raghunathpur I – 67.36%
Raghunathpur II – 67.29%
Neturia – 65.14%
Santuri – 64.15%
Kashipur – 71.06%
2011 Census: CD Block Wise

Primary Census Abstract Data

=== Language and religion ===
Religion in Hura CD block (2011)
Hinduism	81.00%
Other (tribal religion)	11.87%
Islam	6.83%
Other or not stated	0.30%

In the 2011 census Hindus numbered 116,296 and formed 81.00% of the population in Hura CD Block. Muslims numbered 9,807 and formed 6.83% of the population. Others numbered 17,472 and formed 12.17% of the population. Others include Addi Bassi, Marang Boro, Santal, Saranath, Sari Dharma, Sarna, Alchchi, Bidin, Sant, Saevdharm, Seran, Saran, Sarin, Kheria, and other religious communities. In 2001, Hindus were 80.45%, Muslims 6.26% and tribal religions 13.19% of the population respectively.

Languages of Hura CD block (2011)
1. Bengali (81.7%)
2. Santali (16.1%)
3. Kurmali (1.90%)
4. Others (0.25%)

At the time of the 2011 census, 81.74% of the population spoke Bengali, 16.11% Santali and 1.90% Kurmali as their first language.

== Rural poverty ==
According to the Rural Household Survey in 2005, 32.85% of total number of families were BPL families in Purulia district. According to a World Bank report, as of 2012, 31-38% of the population in Purulia, Murshidabad and Uttar Dinajpur districts were below poverty level, the highest among the districts of West Bengal, which had an average 20% of the population below poverty line.

== Economy ==
=== Livelihood ===
Livelihood
in Hura CD block
1. Cultivators (25.1%)
2. Agricultural labourers (50.3%)
3. Household industries (2.53%)
4. Other Workers (22.1%)

In the Hura CD block in 2011, among the class of total workers, cultivators numbered 17,454 and formed 25.06%, agricultural labourers numbered 35,033 and formed 50.31%, household industry workers numbered 1,762 and formed 2.53% and other workers numbered 15,391 and formed 22.10%. Total workers numbered 69,640 and formed 48.50% of the total population, and non-workers numbered 73,935 and formed 51.50% of the population.

Note: In the census records a person is considered a cultivator, if the person is engaged in cultivation/ supervision of land owned by self/government/institution. When a person who works on another person's land for wages in cash or kind or share, is regarded as an agricultural labourer. Household industry is defined as an industry conducted by one or more members of the family within the household or village, and one that does not qualify for registration as a factory under the Factories Act. Other workers are persons engaged in some economic activity other than cultivators, agricultural labourers and household workers. It includes factory, mining, plantation, transport and office workers, those engaged in business and commerce, teachers, entertainment artistes and so on.

=== Infrastructure ===
There are 111 inhabited villages in the Hura CD block, as per the District Census Handbook, Puruliya, 2011. 100% villages have power supply. 111 villages (100%) have drinking water supply. 25 villages (22.52%) have post offices. 98 villages (88.29%) have telephones (including landlines, public call offices and mobile phones). 59 villages (53.15%) have pucca (paved) approach roads and 46 villages (36.04%) have transport communication (includes bus service, rail facility and navigable waterways). 10 villages (9.01%) have agricultural credit societies and 12 villages (10.81%) have banks.

=== Agriculture ===
In 2013-14, persons engaged in agriculture in the Hura CD block could be classified as follows: bargadars 0.51%, patta (document) holders 13.39%, small farmers (possessing land between 1 and 2 hectares) 6.71%, marginal farmers (possessing land up to 1 hectare) 22.12% and agricultural labourers 57.27%.

In 2013-14, the total area irrigated in the Hura CD block was 13,160.68 hectares, out of which 1,198.00 hectares by canal water, 8,397.97 hectares by tank water, 11.21 hectares by river lift irrigation, 185.4 hectares by open dug wells and 3,368.10 hectares by other means.

In 2013-14, the Hura CD block produced 3,673 tonnes of Aman paddy, the main winter crop, from 2,233 hectares, 13 tonnes of Boro paddy, the spring crop, from 5 hectares, 32 tonnes of wheat from 16 hectares. It also produced maskalai, mustard and potatoes.

=== Banking ===
In 2013-14, the Hura CD block had offices of 6 commercial banks and 2 gramin banks.

=== Backward Regions Grant Fund ===
The Purulia district is listed as a backward region and receives financial support from the Backward Regions Grant Fund. The fund, created by the Government of India, is designed to redress regional imbalances in development. As of 2012, 272 districts across the country were listed under this scheme. The list includes 11 districts of West Bengal.

== Transport ==
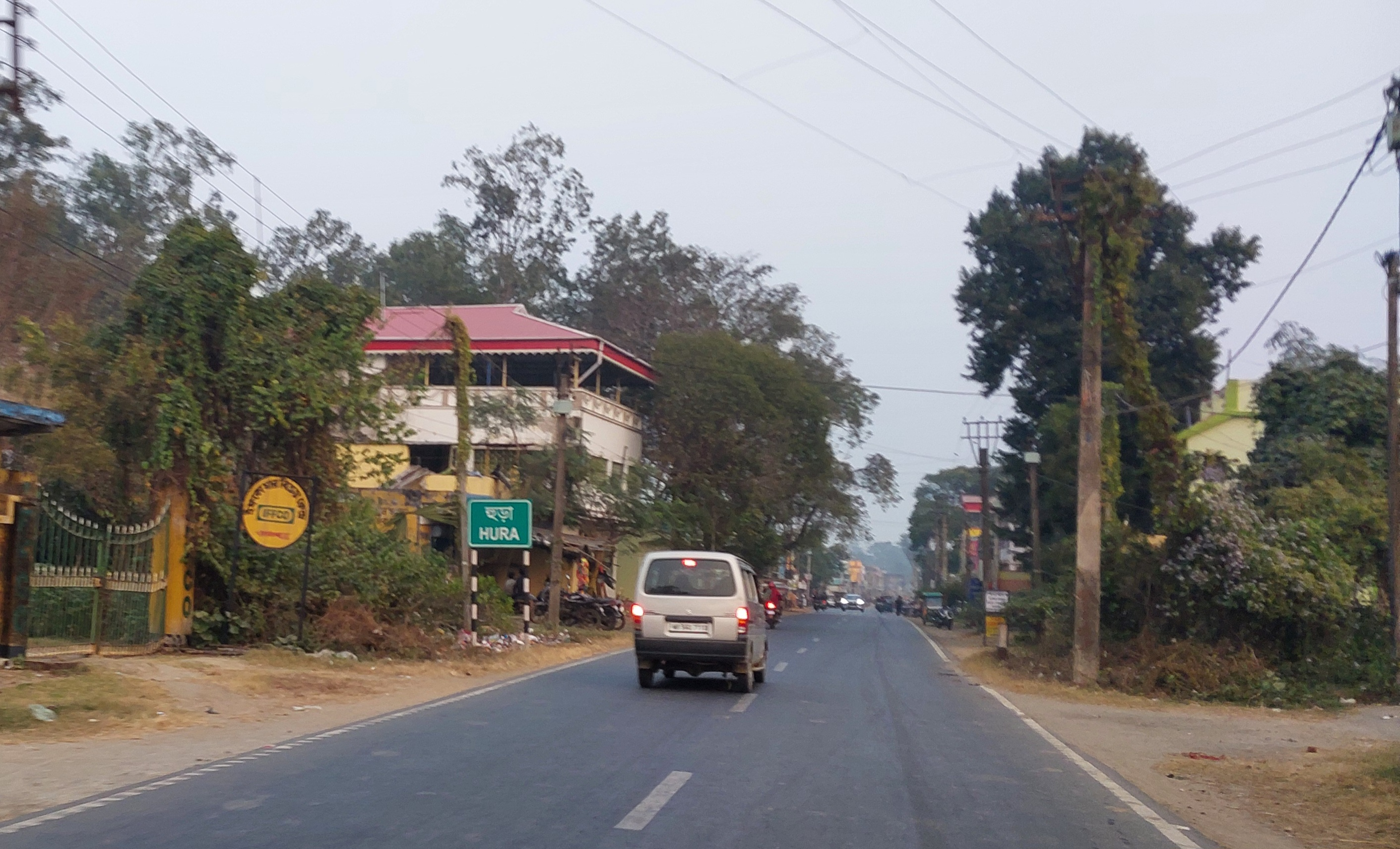
Hura bus stand

In 2013-14, the Hura CD block had 8 originating/ terminating bus routes. The nearest railway station is 24 km from CD block headquarters.

The National Highway 314, running from Bankura to Purulia, passes through this CD block.

== Education ==
In 2013-14, the Hura CD block had 189 primary schools with 13,322 students, 27 middle schools with 1,084 students, 7 high schools with 3,452 students and 16 higher secondary schools with 15,499 students. Hura CD Block had 1 general college with 2,496 students, 2 professional/ technical institutes with 165 students and 322 institutions with 9,023 students for special and non-formal education.

See also – Education in India

According to the 2011 census, in Hura CD block, amongst the 111 inhabited villages, 1 village did not have a school, 72 villages had two or more primary schools, 42 villages had at least 1 primary and 1 middle school and 22 villages had at least 1 middle and 1 secondary school.

Mahatma Gandhi College was established at Daldali, Lalpur in 1981.

== Healthcare ==
In 2014, the Hura CD block had 1 rural hospital and 3 primary health centres, with total 48 beds and 6 doctors. 8,735 patients were treated indoor and 242,155 patients were treated outdoor in the hospitals, health centres and subcentres of the CD block.

Hura Rural Hospital

Inaugration plaque of hura rural hospital

Hura Rural Hospital, with 30 beds at Hura, is the major government medical facility in the Hura CD block. There are primary health centres at Chatumadar (with 4 beds), Khairipihira (with 4 beds) and Ladurkha (with 10 beds).

== See also ==
- Hura Assembly constituency
