= Hura, Purulia =

Hura
- Village
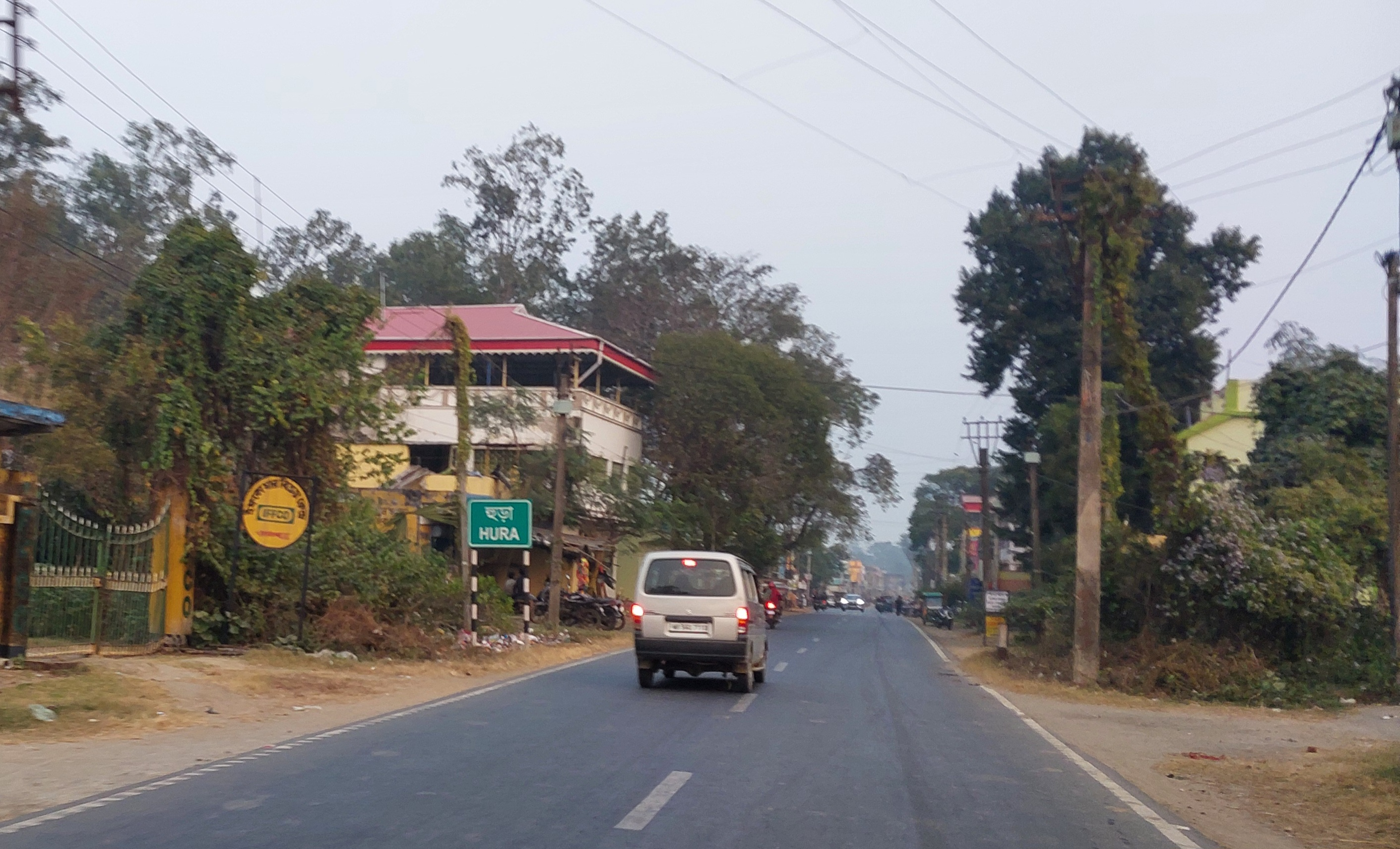
- Hura village

- Location in West Bengal, India Hura (India)
- Coordinates: 23°18′N 86°39′E
- Country: India
- State: West Bengal
- District: Purulia

Population (2011)
  - Total: 3,419

Languages
  - Official: Bengali, English
- Time zone: UTC+5:30 (IST)
- PIN: 723130 (Hura)
- Telephone/STD code: 03251
- Lok Sabha constituency: Purulia
- Vidhan Sabha constituency: Kashipur
- Website: purulia.gov.in

Hura is a village, with a police station, in the Hura CD block in the Purulia Sadar subdivision of the Purulia district in the state of West Bengal, India.

== Geography ==
Places in Purulia Sadar subdivision in Purulia district
M: municipality, CT: census town, R: rural/ urban centre, H: historical/ religious centre, F: facility
Owing to space constraints in the small map, the actual locations in a larger map may vary slightly

=== Location ===
Hura is located at 23°18′N 86°39′E.

=== Area overview ===
Purulia district forms the lowest step of the Chota Nagpur Plateau. The general scenario is undulating land with scattered hills. Purulia Sadar subdivision covers the central portion of the district. 83.80% of the population of the subdivision lives in rural areas. The map alongside shows some urbanization around Purulia city. 18.58% of the population, the highest among the subdivisions of the district, lives in urban areas. There are 4 census towns in the subdivision. The Kangsabati (locally called Kansai) flows through the subdivision. The subdivision has old temples, some of them belonging to the 11th century or earlier. The focus is on education - the university, the sainik school, the Ramakrishna Mission Vidyapith at Bongabari, the upcoming medical college at Hatuara, et al.

Note: The map alongside presents some of the notable locations in the subdivision. All places marked in the map are linked in the larger full screen map.

== Demographics ==
According to the 2011 Census of India, Hura had a total population, of 3,419 of which 1,785 (52%) were males and 1,634 (48%) were females. There were 340 persons in the age range of 0–6 years. The total number of literate persons in Hura was 2,566 (83.34% of the population over 6 years).

== Civic administration ==
=== Police station ===
Hura’s police station has jurisdiction over the Hura CD block. The area covered is 382.21 km^{2} and the population covered is 143,425.

=== CD block HQ ===
The headquarters of Hura CD block are located in Hura.

== Transport ==
The NH 314, running from Bankura to Purulia, passes through Hura. The Kashipur-Hura Road connects to NH 314 at Hura.

== Education ==
Mahatma Gandhi College, at Daldali, Lalpur in Hura PS is a non-government undergraduate college affiliated to Sidho Kanho Birsha University. It offers honours courses in: Bengali, English, Sanskrit, history, political science, education, geography, philosophy. It has courses in B.A. general, B.Sc. general, B.Com. honours and B.Com. general. Santhali is a subject at the B.A. pass level.

== Healthcare ==
Hura Rural Hospital, with 30 beds at Hura, is the major government medical facility in the Hura CD block.
