= Lalpur =

Lalpur may refer to:

- Lalpur, Khutar, Shahjahanpur, Uttar Pradesh, India
- Lalpur Chowk, a residential area in Ranchi, India
- Lalpur, Ranchi, Jharkhand, India
- Lalpur, Agra, Agra, Uttar Pradesh, India
- Lalpur Upazila, Bangladesh
- Lalpur, Uttarakhand, India
- Lalpur, Lumbini, Nepal
- Lalpur, Sagarmatha, Nepal
- Lalpur, Kanpur Dehat district
- Lalpur, Jamnagar district, Gujarat, India
- Lalpur (Rewari), a village in Rewari district in Haryana, India; near Bariawas
- Lalpur (Jhunjhunu), a village in Jhunjhunu district, Rajasthan, India; near Bagar
- Lalpur, Mathurapur, a census town in South 24 Parganas district, West Bengal, India
- Lalpur, Nadia, a census town in Nadia district, West Bengal, India
- Lalpur, Tarn Taran district, Punjab, India
- Lalpur, Khiron, a village in Raebareli district, Uttar Pradesh, India

== See also ==
- Lalpura, Bhopal, a village in Madhya Pradesh, India
