= Kanki =

Kanki can refer to the following:

- Kanki, Uttar Dinajpur, an Indian town
- Kanki, Purulia, a census town in West Bengal, India

== People with the surname ==
- Hiromitsu Kanki, Japanese shogi player
- Tomoya Kanki (神吉 智也, born 1987), Japanese musician
