= Anara, Purulia =

Anara
- Town
- Location in West Bengal Anara (India)
- Coordinates: 23.4802174°N 86.5603302°E
- Country: India
- State: West Bengal
- District: Purulia
- Subdistrict: Para

Population (2011)
  - Total: 5,517
- Time zone: UTC+05:30 (IST)
- Pincode: 723126
- ISO 3166 code: IN-WB

Anara is a Town in the Para CD block in the Raghunathpur subdivision of the Purulia district, West Bengal, India, about 14 km from Adra Junction. Anara Railway Station is having 2 platforms for up trains and down trains. Anara has large number of Railway employees mostly Running staff residing in 3 pockets viz. Bungalow side, Old colony and new colony apart from the market area. There is a big railway school and adjacent to it a play ground.

== Geography ==
Places in Raghunathpur subdivision in Purulia district
M: municipal town, CT: census town, R: rural/ urban centre, H: historical/ religious centre, T: tourist centre
Owing to space constraints in the small map, the actual locations in a larger map may vary slightly

=== Area overview ===
Purulia district forms the lowest step of the Chota Nagpur Plateau. The general scenario is undulating land with scattered hills. Raghunathpur subdivision occupies the northern part of the district. 83.80% of the population of the subdivision lives in rural areas. However, there are pockets of urbanization and 16.20% of the population lives in urban areas. There are 14 census towns in the subdivision. It is presented in the map given alongside. There is a coal mining area around Parbelia and two thermal power plants are there – the 500 MW Santaldih Thermal Power Station and the 1200 MW Raghunathpur Thermal Power Station. The subdivision has a rich heritage of old temples, some of them belonging to the 11th century or earlier. The Banda Deul is a monument of national importance. The comparatively more recent in historical terms, Panchkot Raj has interesting and intriguing remains in the area.

Note: The map alongside presents some of the notable locations in the subdivision. All places marked in the map are linked in the larger full screen map.

== Demographics ==
According to the 2011 Census of India, Anara had a total population of 5,517, of which 2,822 (51%) were males and 2695 (49%) were females. There were 679 persons in the age range of 0–6 years. The total number of literate persons in Anara was 2,964 (61.26& of the population over 6 years).

== Transport ==
Anara is off State Highway 5 running from Rupnarayanpur (in Bardhaman district) to Junput (in Purba Medinipur district).

There is a station at Anara on the Adra-Purulia sector of the Asansol-Tatanagar-Kharagpur line of the South Eastern Railway. South Bihar Express and Swarnarekha Express are two major trains that stops here.

== Education ==
Raghunathpur College was established in 1961 at Raghunathpur.

Anara South Eastern Railway Colony High School is a Bengali-medium boys only institution established in 1957. It has facilities for teaching from class V to class XII.

Anara Girls High School is a Bengali-medium girls only institution established in 1962. It has facilities for teaching from class V to class XII.

== Culture ==
Banda Deul, located nearby, an 11th-century temple, is a monument of national importance.

There are some protected monuments at Para, under the Government of West Bengal.
