= Para (community development block) =

- Community development block
- Location in West Bengal
- Coordinates: 23°31′00″N 86°31′00″E
- Country: India
- State: West Bengal
- District: Purulia
- Parliamentary constituency: Purulia
- Assembly constituency: Para

Area
  - Total: 312.59 km^{2} (120.69 sq mi)
- Elevation: 192 m (630 ft)

Population (2011)
  - Total: 200,621
  - Density: 641.80/km^{2} (1,662.3/sq mi)
- Time zone: UTC+5.30 (IST)
- PIN: 723155 (Para); 723162 (Dubra); 723126 (Anara RS); 723146 (Santaldih TP)
- Telephone/STD code: 03251
- Vehicle registration: WB-55, WB-56
- Literacy Rate: 65.62 per cent

Para is a community development block (CD block) that forms an administrative division in the Raghunathpur subdivision of the Purulia district in the Indian state of West Bengal.

== History ==
=== Background ===
The Jaina Bhagavati-Sutra of the 5th century AD mentions that Purulia was one of the sixteen mahajanapadas and was a part of the kingdom known as Vajra-bhumi in ancient times. In 1833, the Manbhum district was carved out of the Jungle Mahals district, with headquarters at Manbazar. In 1838, the headquarters was transferred to Purulia. After independence, when Manbhum district was a part of Bihar, efforts were made to impose Hindi on the Bengali-speaking majority of the district and it led to the Bengali Language Movement (Manbhum). In 1956, the Manbhum district was partitioned between Bihar and West Bengal under the States Reorganization Act and the Bihar and West Bengal (Transfer of Territories) Act 1956.

== Geography ==
CD blocks in Purulia district

Para is located at 23°31′N 86°31′E.

The Para CD block is located in the north-western part of the district. The area becomes undulating with hillocks of hard rocks, which are extended from the high Chota Nagpur Plateau. There are some hills ranging from 150 to 750 meters approximately in altitude.

The Para CD block is bounded by the Raghunathpur II CD block on the north, the Raghunathpur I and Kashipur CD blocks on the east, the Hura and Purulia II CD blocks on the south and the Jhalda II CD block and the Chandankiyari CD block, in the Bokaro district of Jharkhand, on the west.

The Para CD block has an area of 312.59 km^{2}. It has 1 panchayat samity, 10 gram panchayats, 136 gram sansads (village councils), 135 mouzas, 118 inhabited villages and 5 census towns. Para and Santaldih (partly) police stations serve this block. Headquarters of this CD block is at Para.

Gram panchayats of the Para CD block/panchayat samiti are: Anara, Bahara, Deoli, Dubra, Jabarra Jhapra I, Jabara Jhapra II, Nadiha Surulia, Para and Udaipur-Joinagar.

== Demographics ==
=== Population ===
According to the 2011 Census of India, the Para CD block had a total population of 200,621, of which 167,997 were rural and 32,624 were urban. There were 103,306 (51%) males and 97,315 (49%) females. There were 29,376 persons in the age range of 0 to 6 years. The Scheduled Castes numbered 66,751 (33.27%) and the Scheduled Tribes numbered 10,335 (5.15%).

According to the 2001 census, the Para CD block had a total population of 174,596, out of which 90,259 were males and 84,337 were females. The Para CD block registered a population growth of 15.45 per cent during the 1991-2001 decade. Decadal growth for the Purulia district was 13.96 per cent. Decadal growth in West Bengal was 17.84 per cent.

Census towns in the Para CD block are (2011 census figures in brackets): Santaldih Power Project Town (2,507), Kanki (6,884), Dubra (5,506), Chapari (6,556) and Shankara (11,171).

Large villages (with 4,000+ population) in the Para CD block are (2011 census figures in brackets): Para (9,697), Anara (5,517) and Phusrabai 4,207).

Other villages in Para CD block are (2011 census figures in brackets): Deuli (2,044), Jabarra (3,244), Nadiha (2,029), Baharra (2,241), Suruliya (3,405), Jhapra alias Udaipur (2,944) and Haraktor (1,309).

=== Literacy ===
According to the 2011 census, the total number of literate persons in the Para CD block was 112,377 (65.62% of the population over 6 years) out of which males numbered 70,311 (79.61% of the male population over 6 years) and females numbered 42,066 (50.73%) of the female population over 6 years). The gender disparity (the difference between female and male literacy rates) was 28.88%.

See also – List of West Bengal districts ranked by literacy rate

Literacy in CD blocks of
Purulia district
Purulia Sadar subdivision
Arsha – 57.48%
Balarampur – 60.40%
Hura – 68.79%
Purulia I – 78.37%
Purulia II – 63.39%
Manbazar subdivision
Barabazar – 63.27
Bandwan – 61.38%
Manbazar I – 63.78%
Manbazar II – 60.27%
Puncha – 68.14%
Jhalda subdivision
Baghmundi – 57.17%
Jhalda I – 66.18%
Jhalda II – 54.76%
Joypur – 57.94%
Raghunathpur subdivision
Para – 65.62%
Raghunathpur I – 67.36%
Raghunathpur II – 67.29%
Neturia – 65.14%
Santuri – 64.15%
Kashipur – 71.06%
2011 Census: CD Block Wise

Primary Census Abstract Data

=== Language and religion ===
Religion in Para CD block (2011)
Hinduism	79.53%
Islam	18.37%
Other (tribal religion)	1.68%
Other or not stated	0.42%

In the 2011 census, Hindus numbered 159,554 and formed 79.53% of the population in the Para CD block. Muslims numbered 36,853 and formed 18.37% of the population. Others numbered 4,214 and formed 2.10% of the population. Others include Addi Bassi, Marang Boro, Santal, Saranath, Sari Dharma, Sarna, Alchchi, Bidin, Sant, Saevdharm, Seran, Saran, Sarin, Kheria, and other religious communities. In 2001, Hindus were 81.16%, Muslims 16.10% and tribal religions 2.07% of the population respectively.

Languages of Para CD block (2011)
1. Bengali (93.5%)
2. Santali (2.20%)
3. Hindi (2.07%)
4. Kurmali (1.47%)
5. Others (0.71%)

At the time of the 2011 census, 93.55% of the population spoke Bengali, 2.20% Santali, 2.07% Hindi and 1.47% Kurmali as their first language.

== Rural Poverty ==
According to the Rural Household Survey in 2005, 32.85% of total number of families were BPL families in Purulia district. According to a World Bank report, as of 2012, 31-38% of the population in Purulia, Murshidabad and Uttar Dinajpur districts were below poverty level, the highest among the districts of West Bengal, which had an average 20% of the population below poverty line.

== Economy ==
=== Livelihood ===
Livelihood
in Para CD block
1. Cultivators (16.9%)
2. Agricultural labourers (35.3%)
3. Household industries (3.34%)
4. Other Workers (44.4%)

In the Para CD block in 2011, among the class of total workers, cultivators numbered 12,249 and formed 16.95%, agricultural labourers numbered 25,529 and formed 35.34%, household industry workers numbered 2,410 and formed 3.34% and other workers numbered 32,059 and formed 44.37%. Total workers numbered 72,247 and formed 36.01% of the total population, and non-workers numbered 128,374 and formed 63.99% of the population.

Note: In the census records a person is considered a cultivator, if the person is engaged in cultivation/ supervision of land owned by self/government/institution. When a person who works on another person's land for wages in cash or kind or share, is regarded as an agricultural labourer. Household industry is defined as an industry conducted by one or more members of the family within the household or village, and one that does not qualify for registration as a factory under the Factories Act. Other workers are persons engaged in some economic activity other than cultivators, agricultural labourers and household workers. It includes factory, mining, plantation, transport and office workers, those engaged in business and commerce, teachers, entertainment artistes and so on.

=== Infrastructure ===
There are 118 inhabited villages in the Para CD block, as per the District Census Handbook, Puruliya, 2011, 100% villages have power supply. 117 villages (99.15%) have drinking water supply. 16 villages (13.56%) have post offices. 113 villages (95.76%) have telephones (including landlines, public call offices and mobile phones). 40 villages (33.90%) have pucca (paved) approach roads and 55 villages (46.61%) have transport communication (includes bus service, rail facility and navigable waterways). 4 villages (3.39%) have banks.

=== Agriculture ===
In 2013-14, persons engaged in agriculture in the Para CD block could be classified as follows: bargadars 1.90%, patta (document) holders 11.35%, small farmers (possessing land between 1 and 2 hectares) 3.88%, marginal farmers (possessing land up to 1 hectare) 28.42% and agricultural labourers 54.44%.

In 2013-14, the total area irrigated in the Para CD block was 9,794.63 hectares, out of which 2,792.00 hectares were by canals, 6,162.63 hectares by tank water, 235.0 hectares by open dug wells and 635.00 hectares by other means.

In 2013-14, the Para CD block produced 33,070 tonnes of Aman paddy, the main winter crop from 14,499 hectares. It also produced wheat, mustard and potatoes.

=== Banking ===
In 2013-14, the Para CD block had offices of 8 commercial banks and 2 gramin banks.

=== Backward Regions Grant Fund ===
The Purulia district is listed as a backward region and receives financial support from the Backward Regions Grant Fund. The fund, created by the Government of India, is designed to redress regional imbalances in development. As of 2012, 272 districts across the country were listed under this scheme. The list includes 11 districts of West Bengal.

== Transport ==
In 2013-14, the Para CD block had 7 originating/ terminating bus routes.

The Adra-Gomoh branch line of the South-Eastern Railway passes through this CD block. There is a station at Santaldih.

The Adra-Chandil section of the Asansol-Tatanagar-Kharagpur line of the South Eastern Railway passes through this CD block and there is a station at Anara.

The State Highway 8 running from Santaldih (in the Purulia district) to Majhdia (in the Nadia district) originates in this CD block.

== Education ==
In 2013-14, the Para CD block had 166 primary schools with 18,432 students, 26 middle schools with 2,143 students, 3 high schools with 2,250 students and 16 higher secondary schools with 17,204 students. Para CD Block had 2 professional/ technical institutions with 179 students and 289 institutions with 10,029 students for special and non-formal education.

See also – Education in India

According to the 2011 census, in Para CD block, amongst the 118 inhabited villages, 8 villages did not have a school, 30 villages had two or more primary schools, 31 villages had at least 1 primary and 1 middle school and 14 villages had at least 1 middle and 1 secondary school.

== Culture ==
There are some protected monuments at Para village, under the Government of West Bengal.

== Healthcare ==
In 2014, the Para CD block had 1 block primary health centre, 3 primary health centres, 1 medical centre of PSU/ other department and 1 private nursing home with total 156 beds and 29 doctors. 15,895 patients were treated indoor and 331,506 patients were treated outdoor in the hospitals, health centres and subcentres of the CD block.

Para Rural Hospital, with 30 beds at Para, is the major government medical facility in the Para CD block. There are primary health centres at Nadiha (with 10 beds), Ashar Bandh (PO Tentulbari) (with 2 beds) and Phursrabad (with 4 beds).
