= Haraktor =

- Village
- Location in West Bengal, India Haraktor (India)
- Coordinates: 23.5215°N 86.4516°E
- Country: India
- State: West Bengal
- District: Purulia

Population (2011)
  - Total: 1,309

Languages
  - Official: Bengali, English
- Time zone: UTC+5:30 (IST)
- PIN: 723155
- Telephone/STD code: 03251
- Lok Sabha constituency: Purulia
- Vidhan Sabha constituency: Para
- Website: purulia.gov.in

Haraktor (also referred to as Deulbhita) is a village in the Para CD block in the Raghunathpur subdivision of the Purulia district in the state of West Bengal, India.

== Geography ==
Places in Raghunathpur subdivision in Purulia district
M: municipal town, CT: census town, R: rural/ urban centre, H: historical/ religious centre, T: tourist centre
Owing to space constraints in the small map, the actual locations in a larger map may vary slightly

=== Location ===
Haraktor is located at 23.5215°N 86.4516°E.

=== Area overview ===
Purulia district forms the lowest step of the Chota Nagpur Plateau. The general scenario is undulating land with scattered hills. Raghunathpur subdivision occupies the northern part of the district. 83.80% of the population of the subdivision lives in rural areas. However, there are pockets of urbanization and 16.20% of the population lives in urban areas. There are 14 census towns in the subdivision. It is presented in the map given alongside. There is a coal mining area around Parbelia and two thermal power plants are there – the 500 MW Santaldih Thermal Power Station and the 1200 MW Raghunathpur Thermal Power Station. The subdivision has a rich heritage of old temples, some of them belonging to the 11th century or earlier. The Banda Deul is a monument of national importance. The comparatively more recent in historical terms, Panchkot Raj has interesting and intriguing remains in the area.

Note: The map alongside presents some of the notable locations in the subdivision. All places marked in the map are linked in the larger full screen map.

== Demographics ==
According to the 2011 Census of India, Haraktor had a total population of 1,309, of which 656 (50%) were males and 653 (50%) were females. There were 189 persons in the age range of 0–6 years. The total number of literate persons in Haraktor was 702 (62.68% of the population over 6 years).

== Culture ==
Harkator is 40 km from Purulia town. The images of Hara-Parbati, Jain Tirthankar, Gayetri, Lokeswar and Bishnu in different postures bear the architectural grace of the 10th century.

According to a news report, numerous statues related to Jainism and Hinduism found in the mound at Haraktor have led to the popular belief that there was a craft centre there. Subash Roy, a history researcher, feels that the craft centre came up on the banks of the Harak River around the 9th century. Many of the statues have been preserved in the Basanti temple, primarily as a result of the efforts of the local priest Sudhir Mishra.

The mound at Haraktor is included in the List of State Protected Monuments in West Bengal.

== Haraktor picture gallery ==
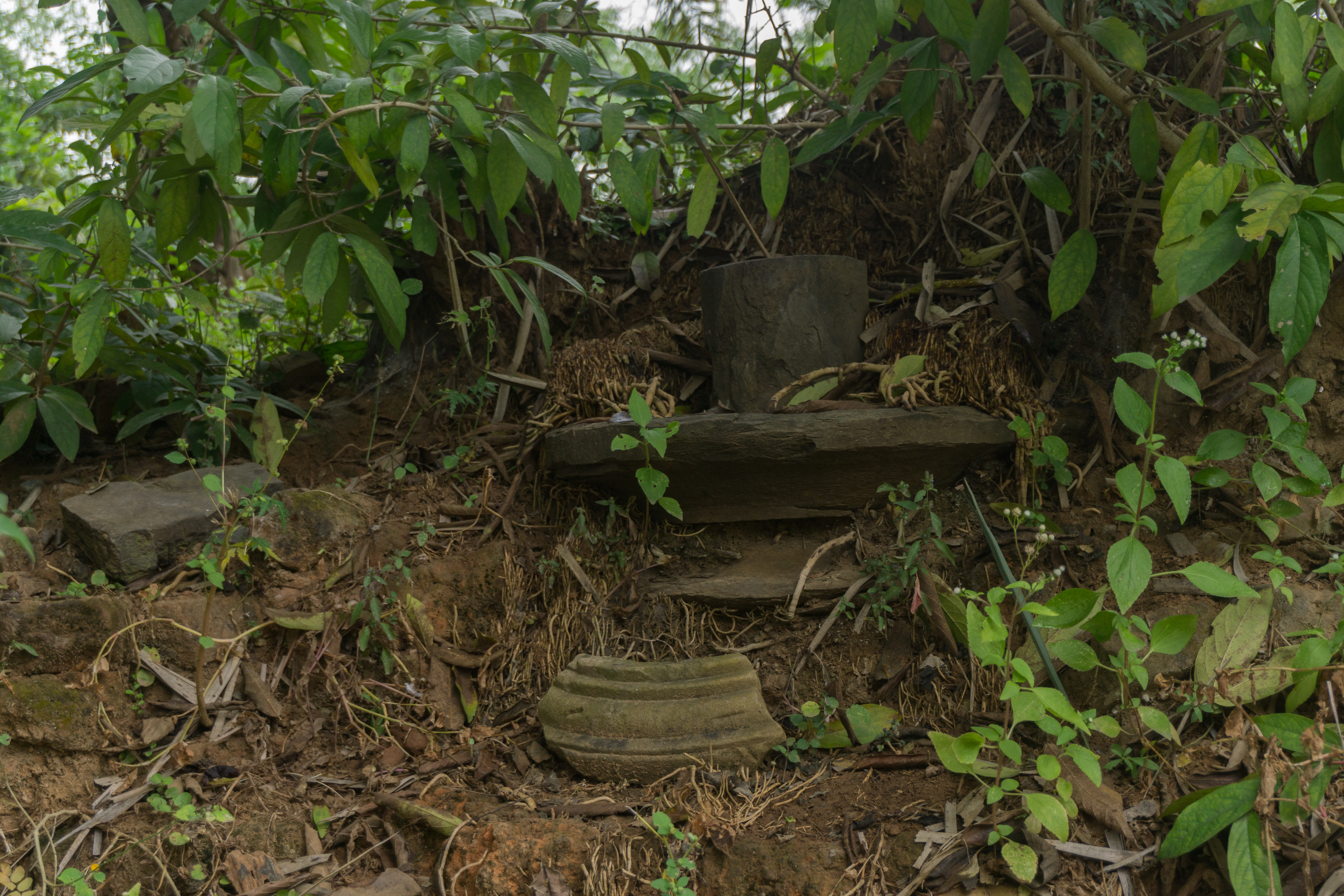
Harktor mound

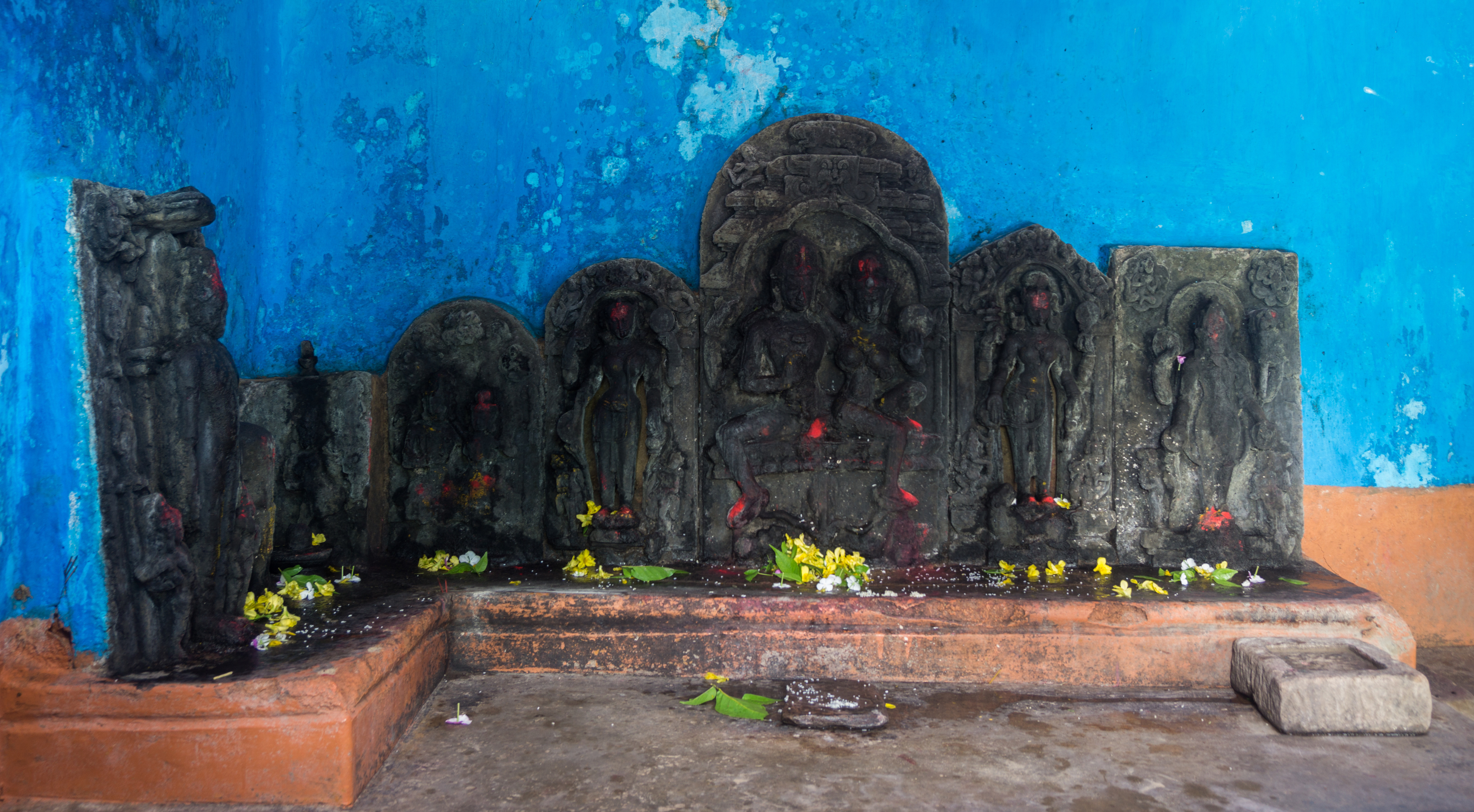
Stone idols preserved inside the temple

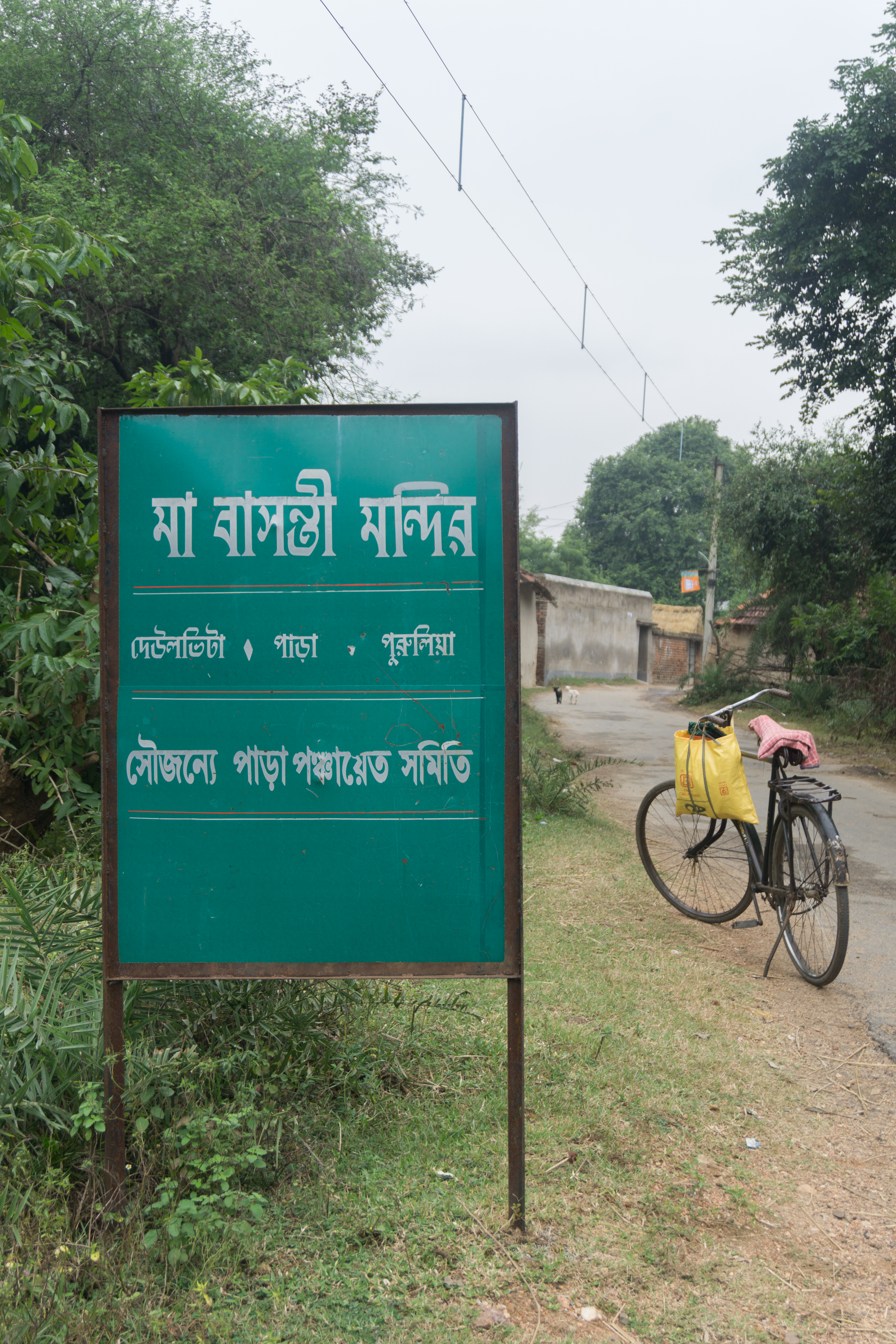
Haraktor temple board

== Healthcare ==
Para Block Primary Health Centre, with 30 beds, at Para, is a major government medical facility in the Para CD block.
