= Lalpura, Bhopal =

Lalpura
- village
- Location within Madhya Pradesh Location within India
- Coordinates: 23.2272728°N 77.5511944°E
- Country: India
- State: Madhya Pradesh
- District: Bhopal
- Tehsil: Huzur
- Elevation: 452 m (1,483 ft)

Population (2011)
  - Total: 100
- Time zone: UTC+5:30 (IST)
- ISO 3166 code: MP-IN
- 2011 census code: 482443

Lalpura is a village in the Bhopal district of Madhya Pradesh, India. It is located in the Huzur tehsil and the Phanda block.

== Demographics ==
According to the 2011 census of India, Lalpura has 20 households. The effective literacy rate (i.e. the literacy rate of population excluding children aged 6 and below) is 12.2%.

Demographics (2011 Census)
	Total	Male	Female
Population	100	55	45
Children aged below 6 years	18	9	9
Scheduled caste	1	0	1
Scheduled tribe	0	0	0
Literates	10	7	3
Workers (all)	47	26	21
Main workers (total)	47	26	21
Main workers: Cultivators	1	1	0
Main workers: Agricultural labourers	44	24	20
Main workers: Household industry workers	2	1	1
Main workers: Other	0	0	0
Marginal workers (total)	0	0	0
Marginal workers: Cultivators	0	0	0
Marginal workers: Agricultural labourers	0	0	0
Marginal workers: Household industry workers	0	0	0
Marginal workers: Others	0	0	0
Non-workers	53	29	24
