= Lalpur, Kapilvastu =

Lalpur लालपुर
- Village development committee
- Location in Nepal
- Coordinates: 27.59°N 82.89°E
- Country: Nepal
- Zone: Lumbini Zone
- District: Kapilvastu District

Population (1991)
  - Total: 4,590
- Time zone: UTC+5:45 (Nepal Time)

Lalpur is a village development committee in Kapilvastu District in the Lumbini Zone of southern Nepal. At the time of the 1991 Nepal census it had a population of 2730 people living in 503 individual households.
