= Mahatma Gandhi College, Purulia =

College in West Bengal, India

Mahatma Gandhi College of Lalpur
- Type: Undergraduate college Public college
- Established: 1981; 45 years ago
- Affiliations: Sidho Kanho Birsha University
- President: Sri Kamalakanta Hansda
- Principal: Dr. Santi Kundu
- Location: The official address of Mahatma Gandhi College (Lalpur College) is:Bankura - Purulia Road, Lalpur, Purulia District, West Bengal, 723130, India., Daldali, Lalpur, Purulia, West Bengal, 723103, India; 23.3067823°N 86.6246699°E
- Campus: Urban
- Language: Bengali, Santali Medium
- Website: http://mahatmagandhicollegelalpur.ac.in/ , https://mgclalpur.ac.in/
- Location within West Bengal Location within India

Mahatma Gandhi College Of Lalpur , established in 1981, is a general degree college in Daldali, Lalpur, Purulia district in Indian state of West Bengal. It offers undergraduate courses in arts, commerce and sciences.

== Accreditation and affiliation ==
The college is recognized by the University Grants Commission (UGC). Recently, it was awarded B grade by the National Assessment and Accreditation Council (NAAC). It is affiliated to Sidho Kanho Birsha University.

== Departments ==
The college has the following departments in Science, Arts and Commerce.

=== Science ===
==== Chemistry ====
The college has its chemistry department with an intake of 30 students. It got affiliation for this department on the session 2005–06. And the course introduced from 2010–2011 session.

==== Mathematics ====
The mathematics department of this college is introduced on 2010–11 session and it has capacity of 30 students.

==== Computer Science ====
The college has got affiliation for this department on 2010–11 session. Currently, it has an intake of 20 students.

==== Botany ====
Botany department of this college got affiliation on 2005–06 session and this course has been started from 2010–2011 session with an intake of 30 students.

==== Zoology ====
The college has its chemistry department with an intake of 30 students. It got affiliation for this department on the session 2005–06. And the course introduced from 2010–2011 session.

=== Arts and Commerce ===
- Bengali
- English
- Sanskrit
- Santhali
- History
- Geography
- Political Science
- Philosophy
- Economics
- Education
- Commerce

== See also ==
- List of institutions of higher education in West Bengal
- Education in India
- Education in West Bengal
