= National Highway 314 (India) =

National highway in India

National Highway 314

Route information
- Length: 206 km (128 mi)

Major junctions
- From: Bankura
- NH-14 at Dhaldanga & NH-43 & NH-20 at Ranchi.
- To: Ranchi

Location
- Country: India
- States: West Bengal, Jharkhand
- Primary destinations: Dhaldanga-Puabagan-Hura-Hutmura-Purulia-Jhalda-Tulin-Muri-Ranchi

Highway system
- Roads in India; Expressways; National; State; Asian
← NH 60A	→ NH 61

National Highway 314 (NH 314) starts from Dhaldanga at Bankura & goes via Purulia to end at Ranchi, in the state of West Bengal & Jharkhand. The highway is 206 km (128 mi) long once used to run only in the state of West Bengal, now after extension to Ranchi, it covers Jharkhand also. The highway was previously known as NH 60A.

== Route ==
- Dhaldanga at Bankura
- Puabagan
- Hura
- Hutmura
- Bhagabanpur
- Purulia
- Kotshila
- Jhalda
- Tulin
- Muri
- Gangadhara
- Tatisilwai
- Namkom
- Ranchi.

== See also ==
- List of national highways in India
- National Highways Development Project
