= Para, Purulia =

Para
- Village
- Location in West Bengal, India Para (India)
- Coordinates: 23.52°N 86.52°E
- Country: India
- State: West Bengal
- District: Purulia
- Subdivision: Raghunathpur

Government
  - Body: Gram panchayat

Languages
  - Official: Bengali, English
- Time zone: UTC+5:30 (IST)
- ISO 3166 code: IN-WB
- Lok Sabha constituency: Purulia
- Vidhan Sabha constituency: Para
- Website: wb.gov.in

Para is a village, with a police station, in the Para CD block in the Raghunathpur subdivision of the Purulia district in West Bengal, India.

== Geography ==
Places in Raghunathpur subdivision in Purulia district
M: municipal town, CT: census town, R: rural/ urban centre, H: historical/ religious centre, T: tourist centre
Owing to space constraints in the small map, the actual locations in a larger map may vary slightly

=== Location ===
Para is located at 23°31′N 86°31′E.

=== Area overview ===
Purulia district forms the lowest step of the Chota Nagpur Plateau. The general scenario is undulating land with scattered hills. Raghunathpur subdivision occupies the northern part of the district. 83.80% of the population of the subdivision lives in rural areas. However, there are pockets of urbanization and 16.20% of the population lives in urban areas. There are 14 census towns in the subdivision. It is presented in the map given alongside. There is a coal mining area around Parbelia and two thermal power plants are there – the 500 MW Santaldih Thermal Power Station and the 1200 MW Raghunathpur Thermal Power Station. The subdivision has a rich heritage of old temples, some of them belonging to the 11th century or earlier. The Banda Deul is a monument of national importance. The comparatively more recent in historical terms, Panchkot Raj has interesting and intriguing remains in the area.

Note: The map alongside presents some of the notable locations in the subdivision. All places marked in the map are linked in the larger full screen map.

== Demographics ==
According to the 2011 Census of India Para had a total population of 9,697 of which 5,031 (52%) were males and 4,666 (48%) were females. There were 1,158 persons in the age range of 0–6 years. The total number of literate persons in Para was 5,453 (63,86% of the population over 6 years).

== Civic administration ==
=== Police station ===
Para police station, along with Santaldih police station, has jurisdiction over the Para CD block. The area covered is 270.59 km^{2} and the population covered is 200,621.

=== CD block HQ ===
The headquarters of the Para CD block are located at Para.

== Education ==
Santaldih College was established in 2008 at Usir, PO Chatarmahul.

Para Shib Narayan High School is a Bengali-medium coeducational institution established in 1916. It has facilities for teaching from class V to class XII. It has a play ground and 2,500 books in the library.

== Culture ==
There are three dilapidated temple Numerous statues related to Jainism and Hinduism have been found at Haraktor.

=== Rekha deul ===
David J. McCutchion says that the pre-dominant traditional architectural style for temples in the western areas of Bengal in the pre-Muslim period is the tall curvilinear rekha deul and it went on developing from the late 7th century or early 8th century to around the 12th century, increasing its complexity and height but retaining its basic features. Such temples had “curvilinear shikhara with chaitya mesh decoration, surmounted by a large amalaka and kalasa finial. Examples of such dilapidated deulas are still standing at Satdeula (in Bardhaman), Bahulara and Sonatapal (in Bankura) and Deulghat (in Purulia). On the brick deulas already mentioned here, plus Jatar (in 24 Parganas) and Para (in Purulia), “we find extensive and remarkably fine stucco work on carved brick”.

== Para picture gallery ==
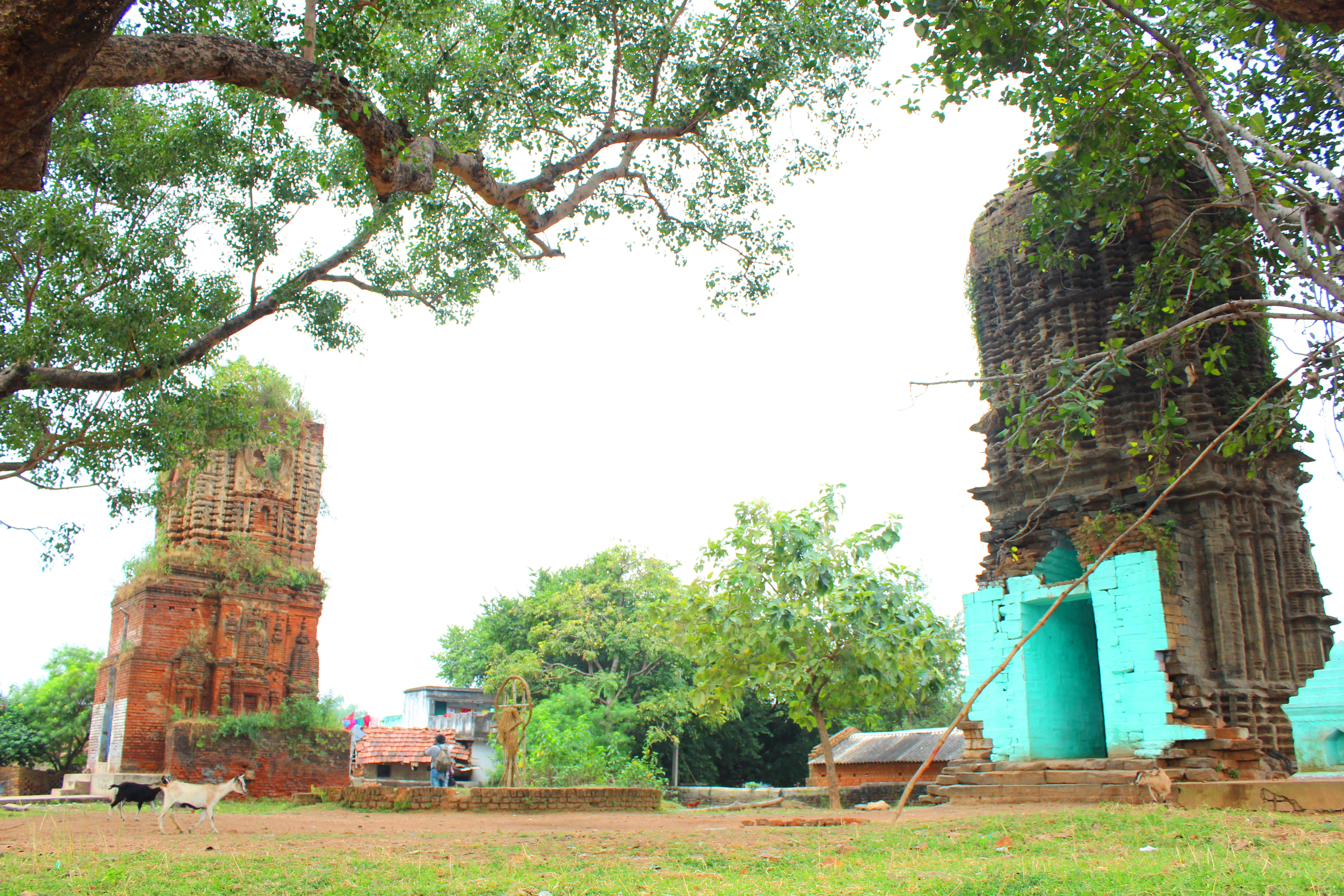
The stone and brick deuls at Para

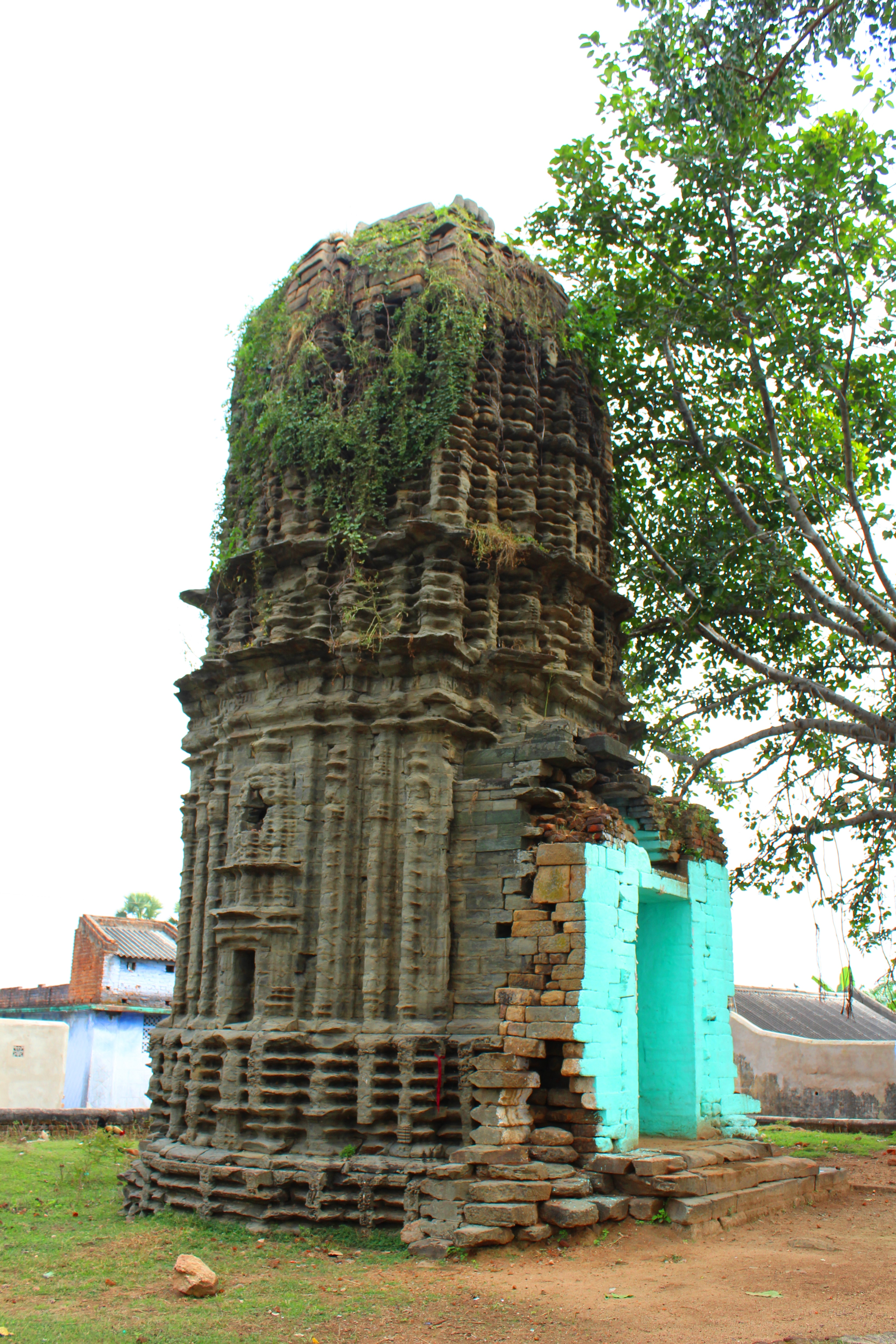
The stone deul

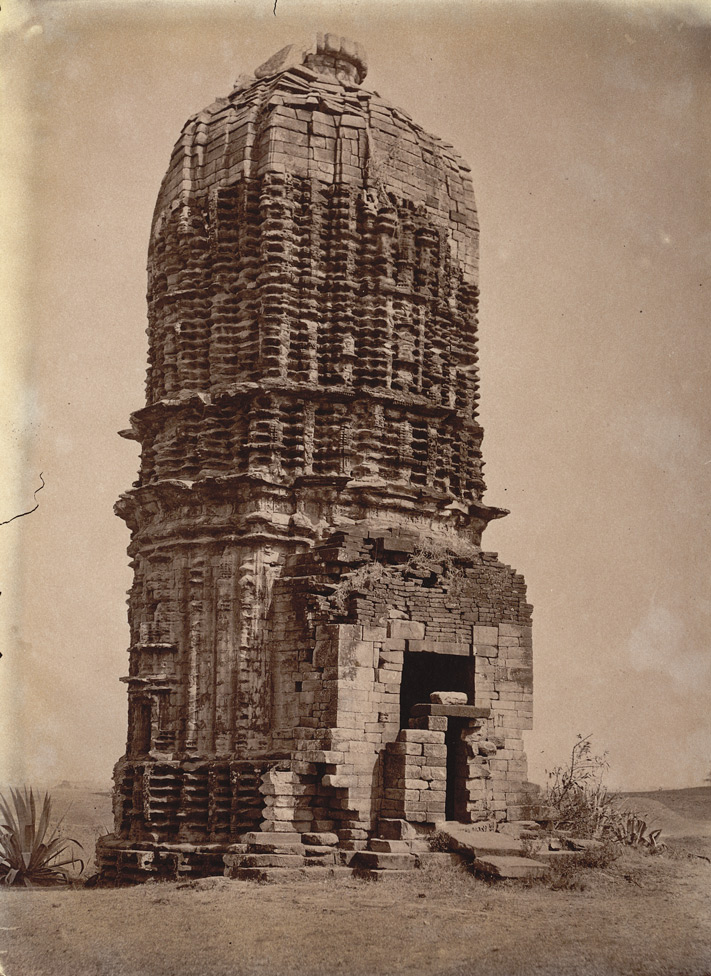
The stone deul in 1872-73
(photograph by Joseph David Beglar)

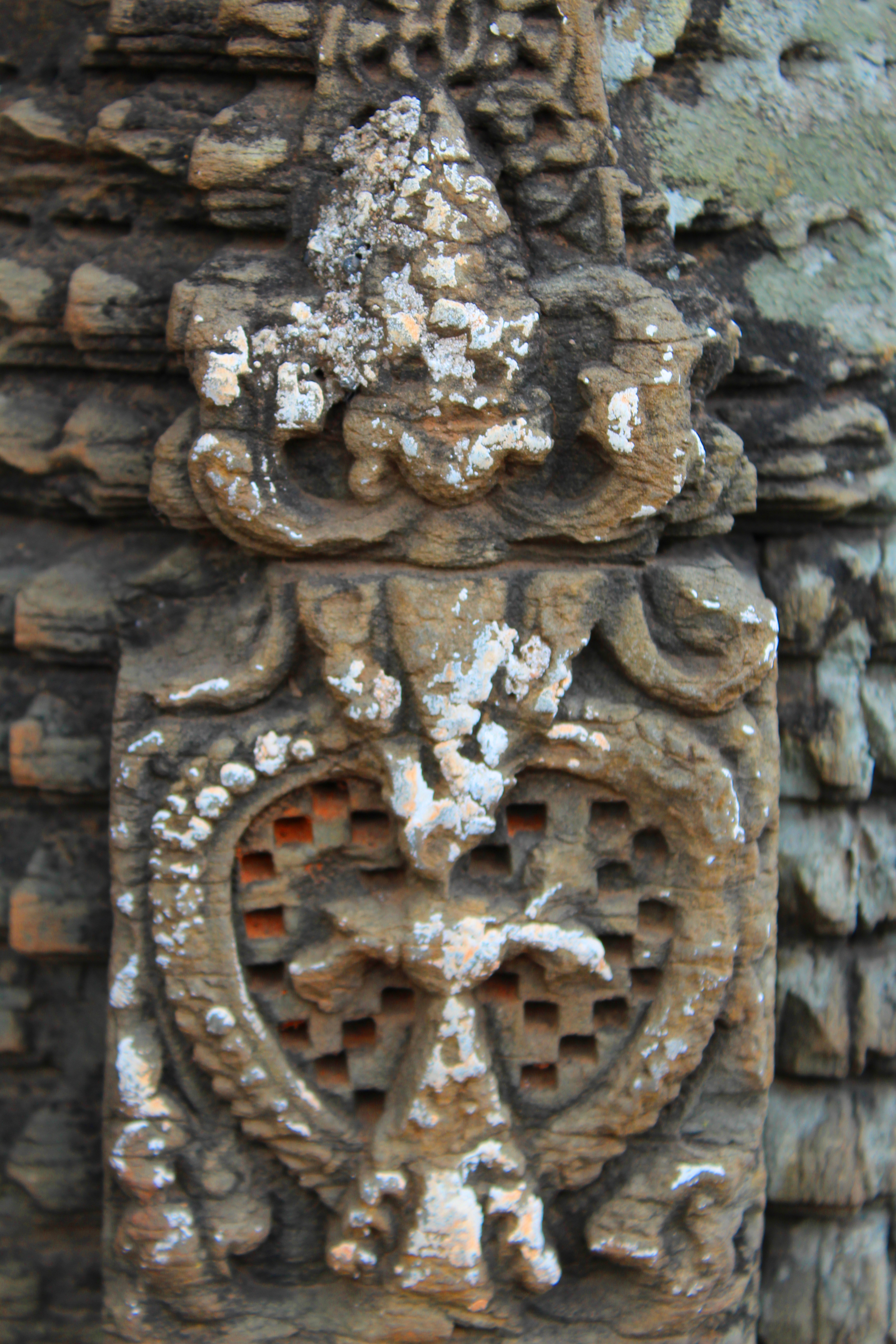
Sculptural panel in stone

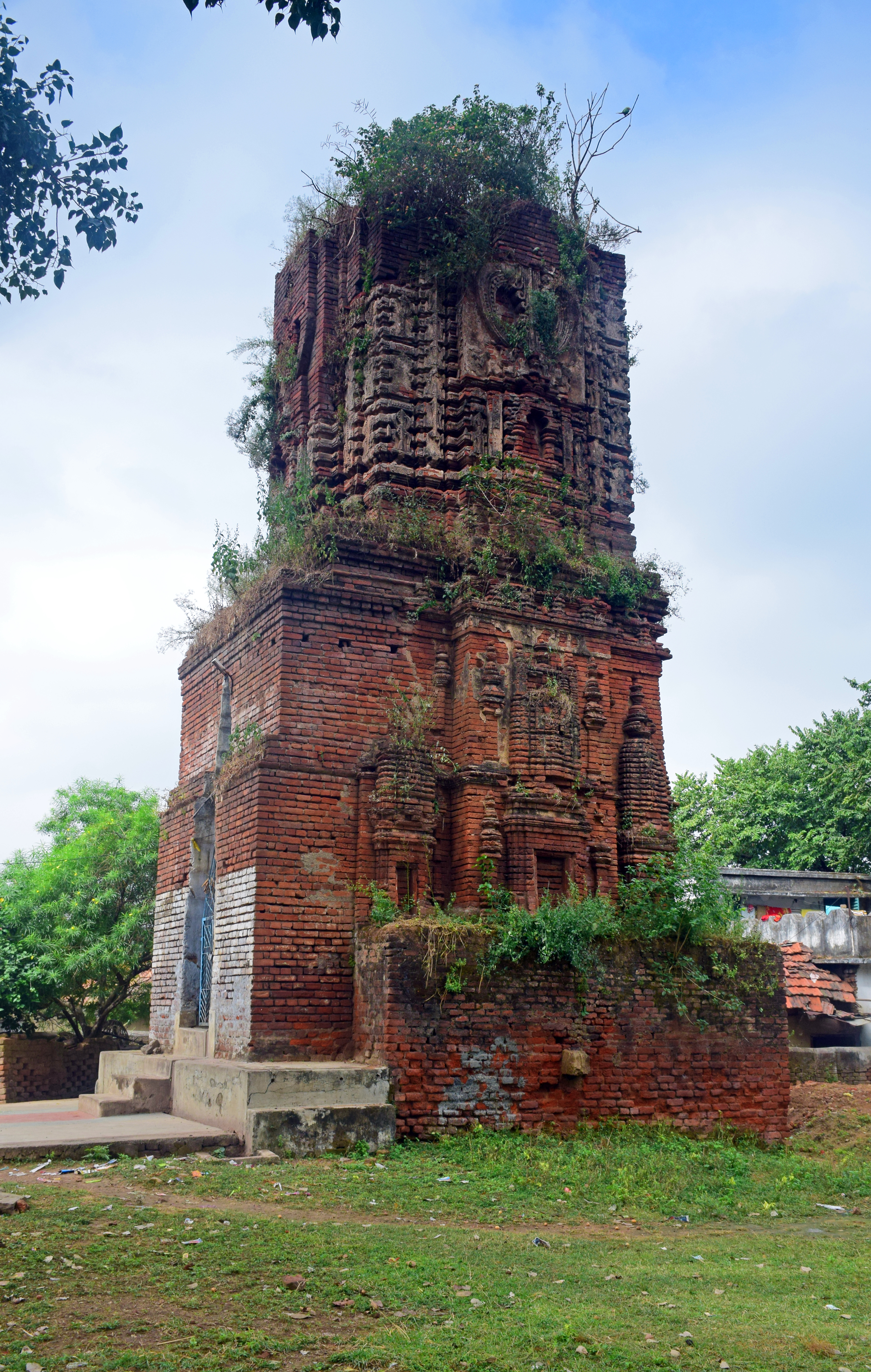
The brick deul

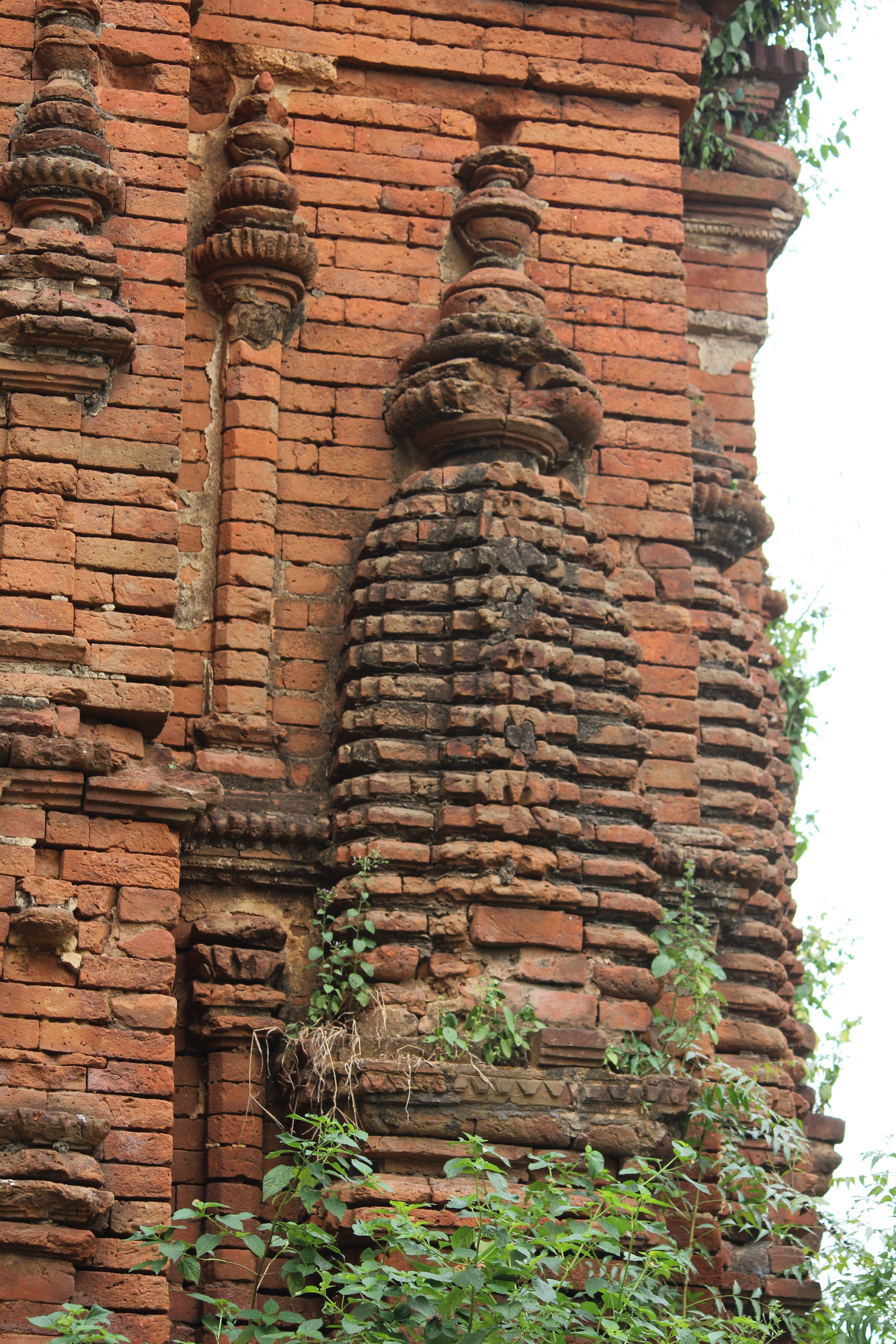
Brick deul wall

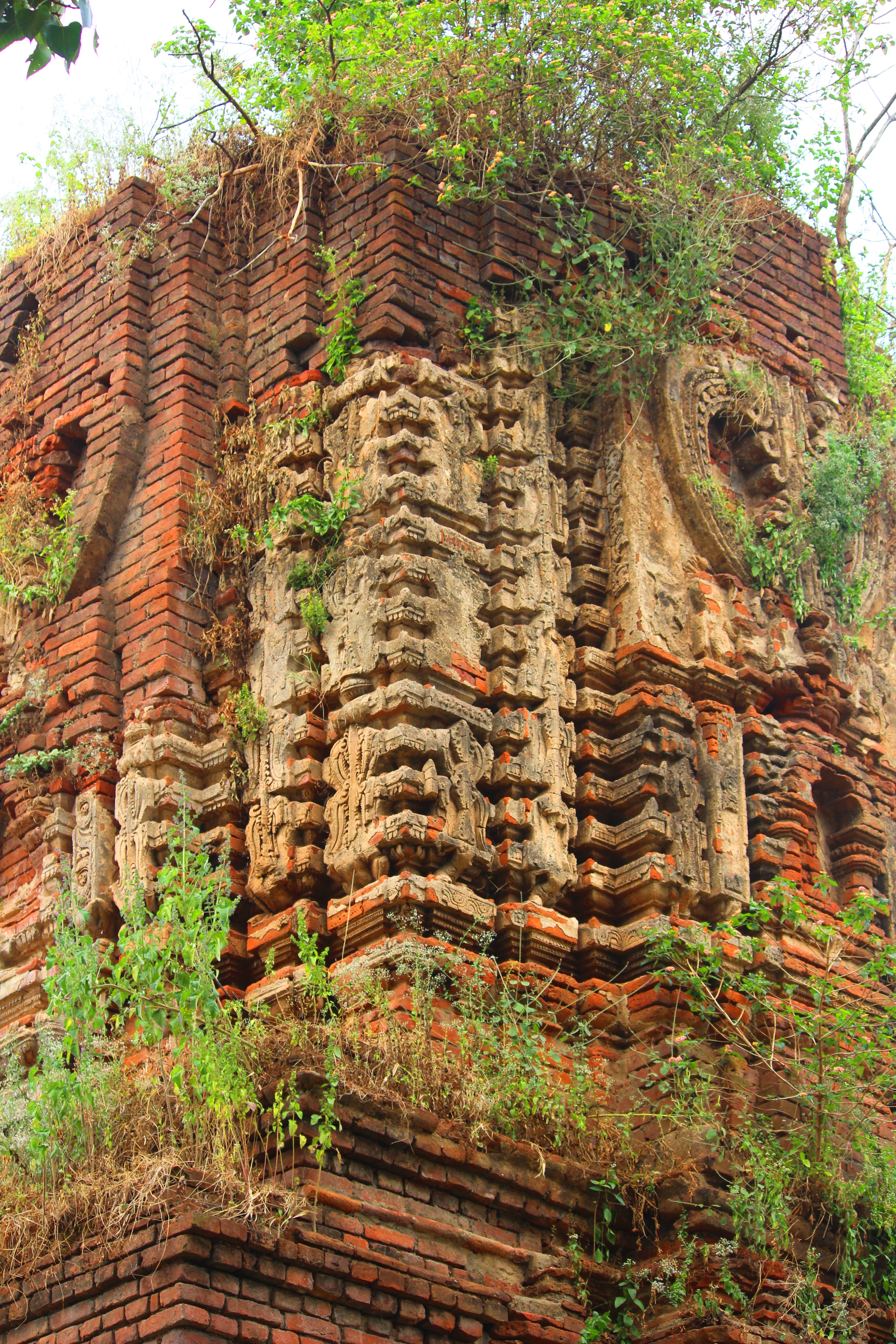
Brick deul with corbelled arch

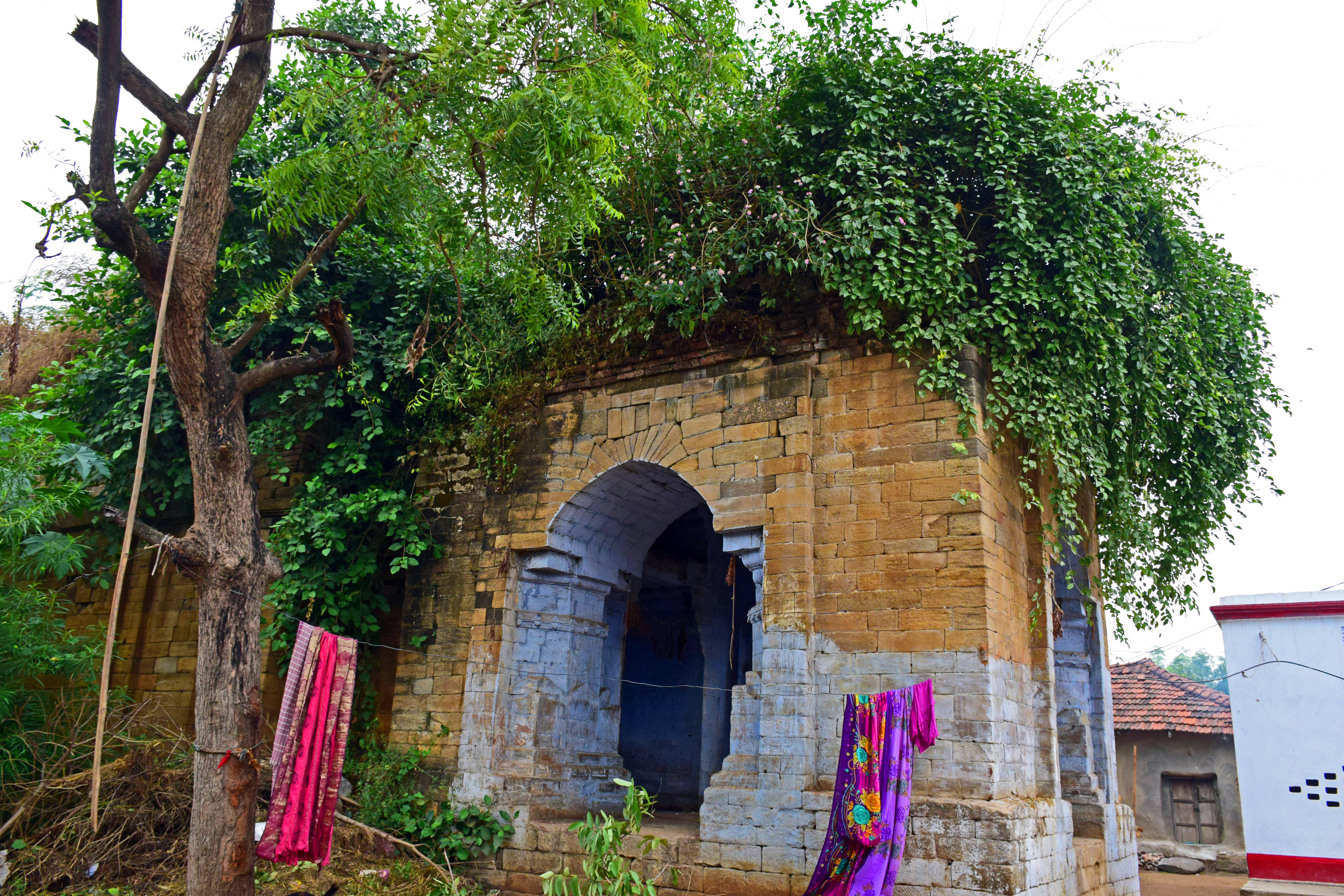
Side view of the third temple

== Healthcare ==
Para Block Primary Health Centre, with 30 beds, is a major government medical facility in the Para CD block.
