= Banda Deul =

Deul temple at Banda, Purulia district

- An ASI Listed Monument
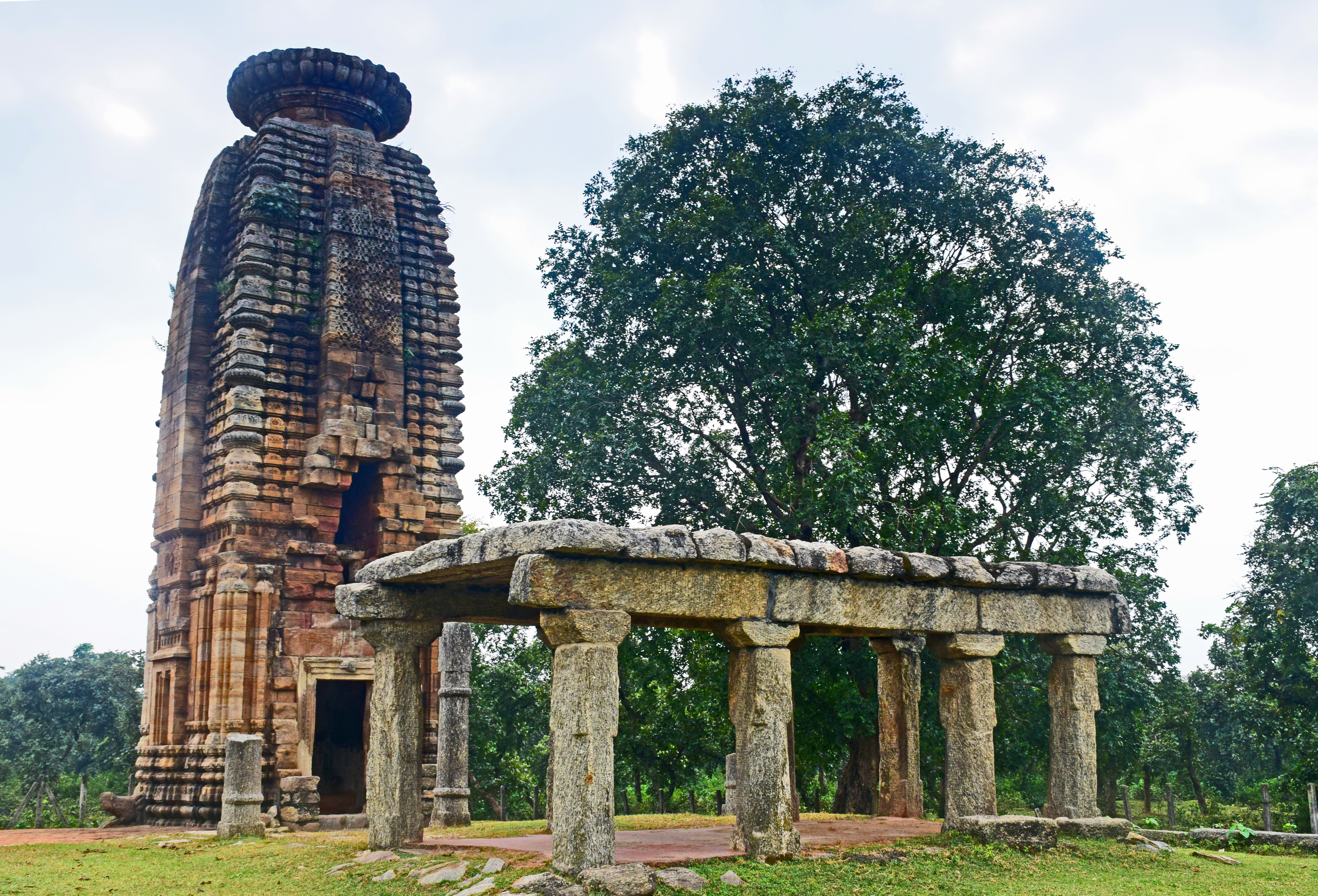

- Location within West Bengal Location within India

Religion
- Affiliation: Hinduism, Jainism

Location
- Location: Banda; Purulia district
- State: West Bengal
- Country: India
- Coordinates: 23.6074°N 86.5587°E

Architecture
- Type: Rekha deul
- Completed: 11th century

Banda Deul is an 11th-century temple in Banda village (also called Deulghera) in the Raghunathpur II CD block in the Raghunathpur subdivision of the Purulia district in the Indian state of West Bengal.

== Geography ==
Places in Raghunathpur subdivision in Purulia district
M: municipal town, CT: census town, R: rural/ urban centre, H: historical/ religious centre, T: tourist centre
Owing to space constraints in the small map, the actual locations in a larger map may vary slightly

=== Location ===
Banda is located at 23.6074°N 86.5587°E.

Banda is 1 km from Cheliyama, which contains the Radha Vinod temple with the most richly decorated terracotta carvings.

Note: The map alongside presents some of the notable locations in the subdivision. All places marked in the map are linked in the larger full screen map.

== Banda Deul ==
There is a temple at Banda, which is described by the Archaeological Survey of India as a rekha deul of triratha variety in sandstone. The temple is richly decorated, the themes being creepers, scroll work and stylised chaitya window. The temple is datable to c. 11th century CE.

In 1872, the archaeologist J.D.Beglar came across this temple, then covered with deep vegetation in a forest. The area around the deul was cleared and it started attracting attention. It is not clear whether it was a Hindu or a Jain temple. The ground plan is star shpaed. Internally the cella is square with a rectangular Mukhamandapa. The temple consists of a single cell and it once had a mandapa.

The temple had a mandapa which has largely collapsed, However, eight pillars are still there supporting the cross beams. The temple has a water outlet with a makara (crocodile) head.

According to the List of Monuments of National Importance in West Bengal the old temple at Banda is an ASI listed monument.

== Banda picture gallery ==
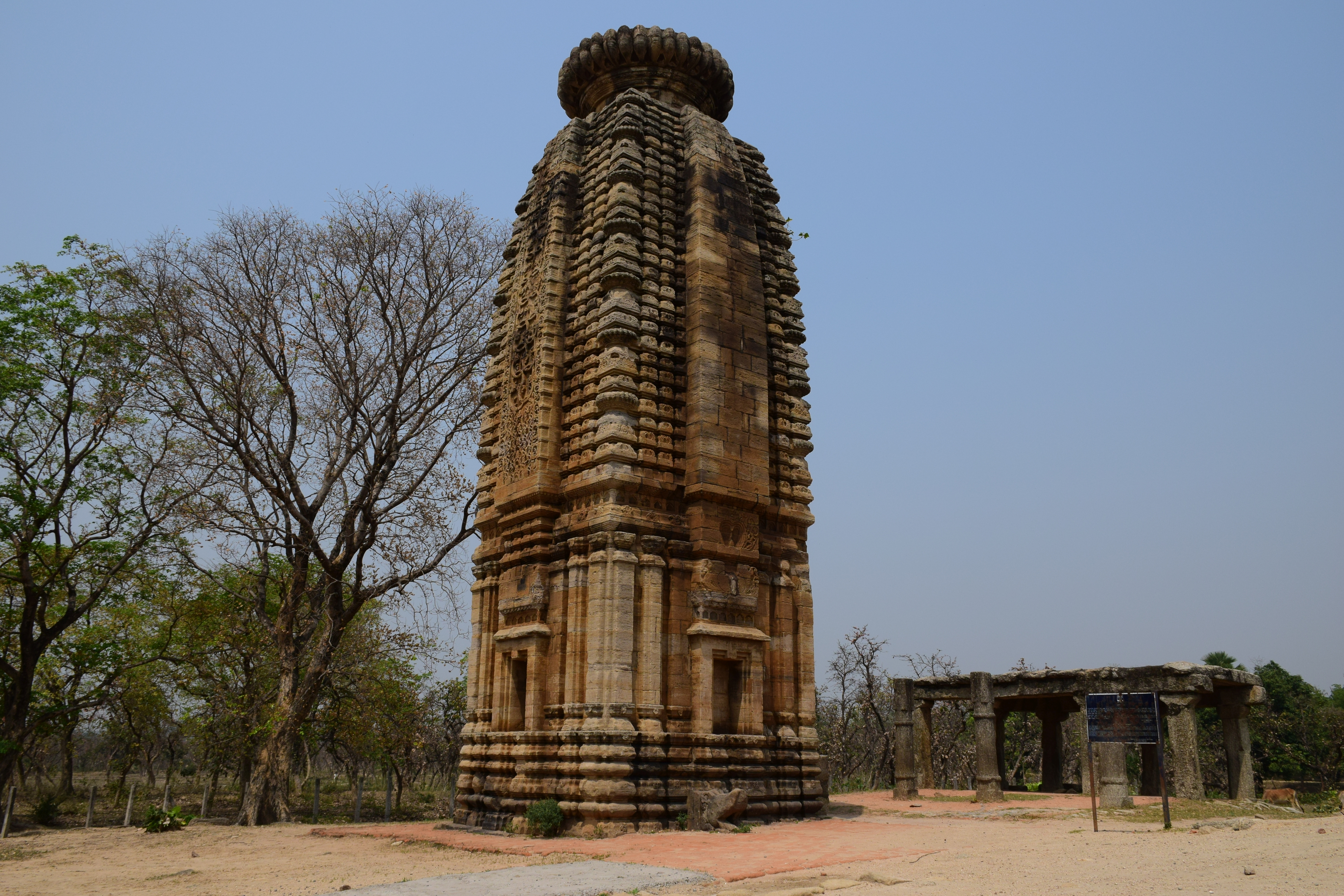
The deul at Banda with remains of the mandapa

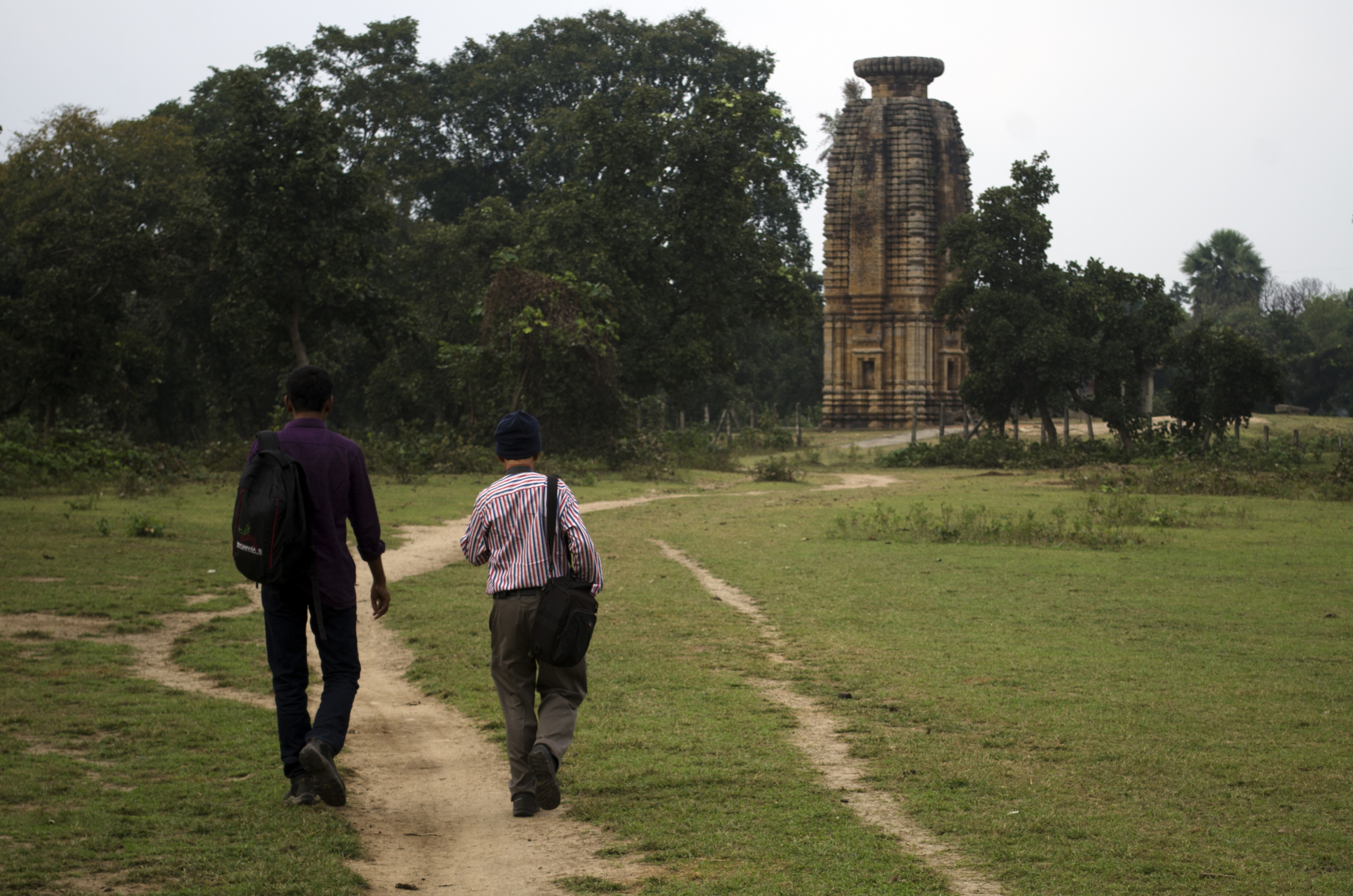
The deul at Banda

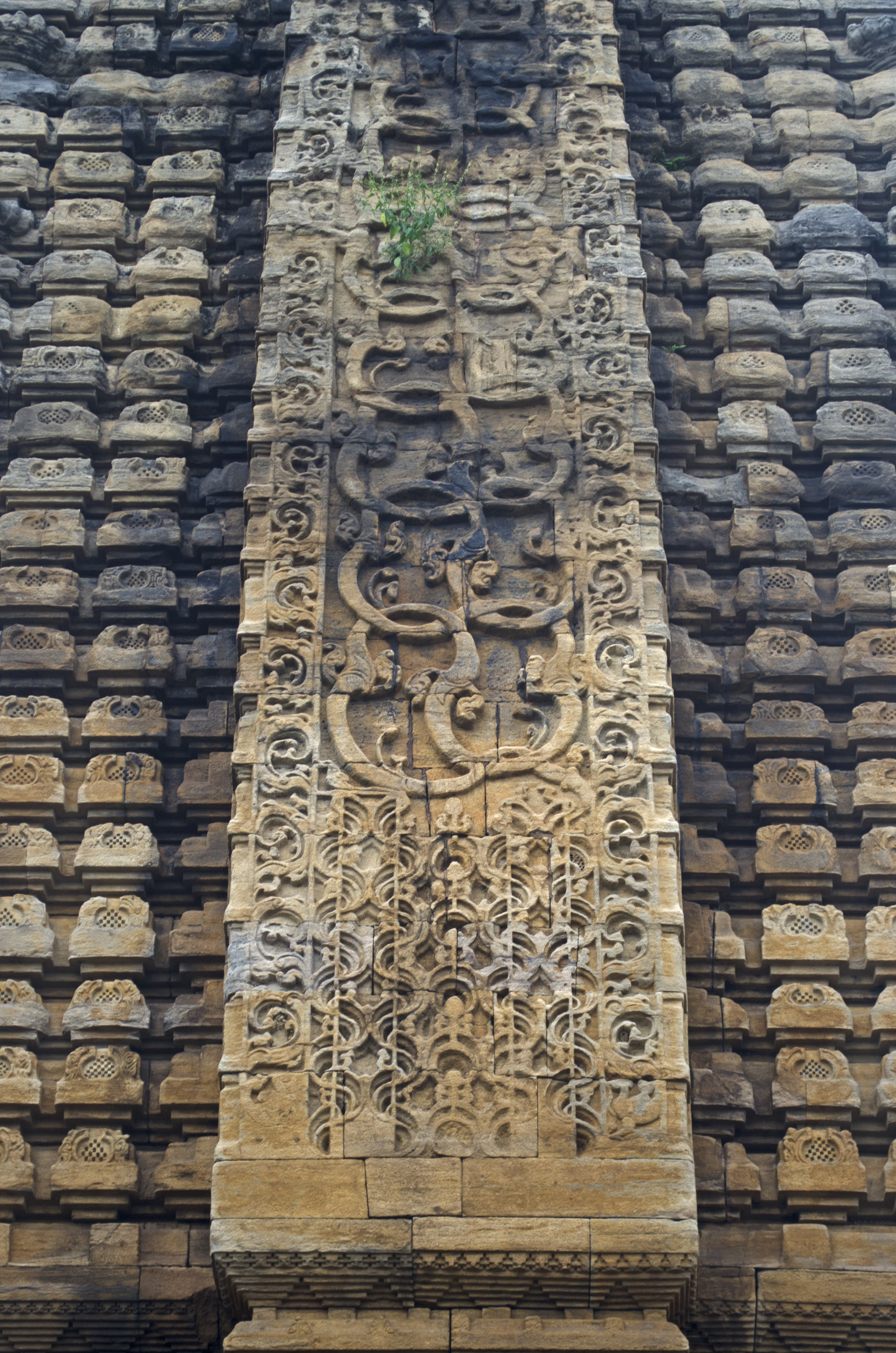
Stone decoration

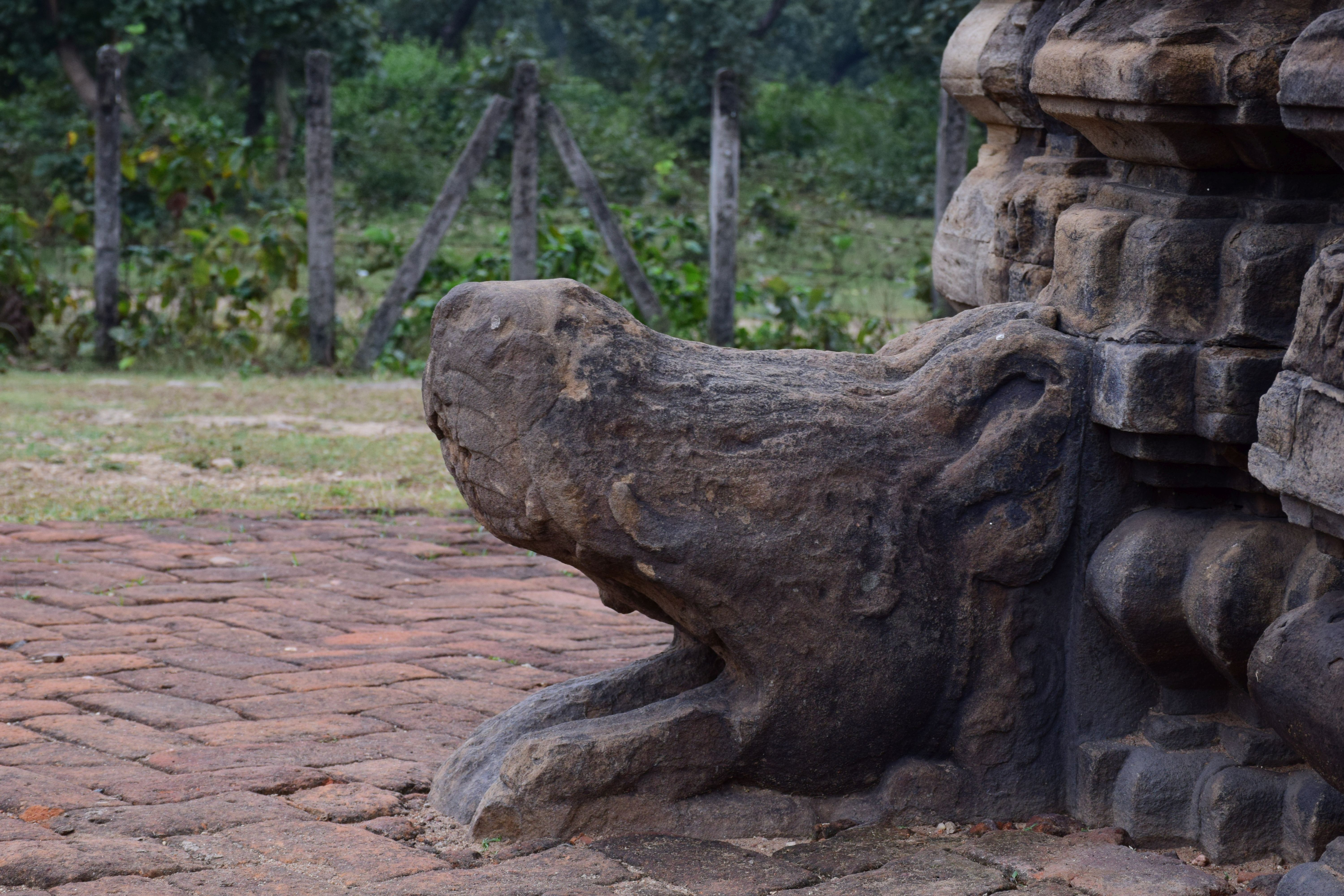
Crocodile head shaped water outlet

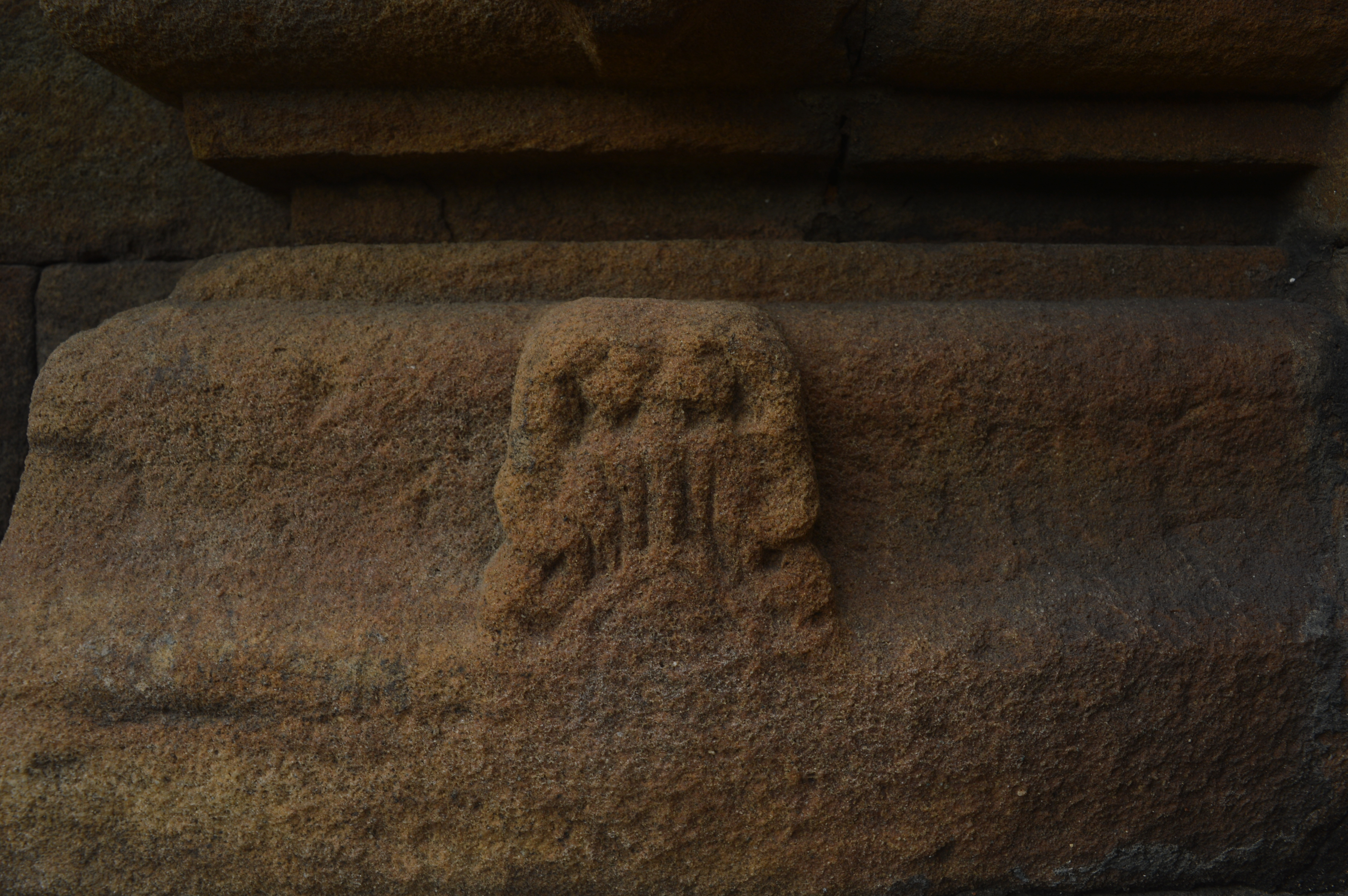
Sculpture on the wall of temple of Banda

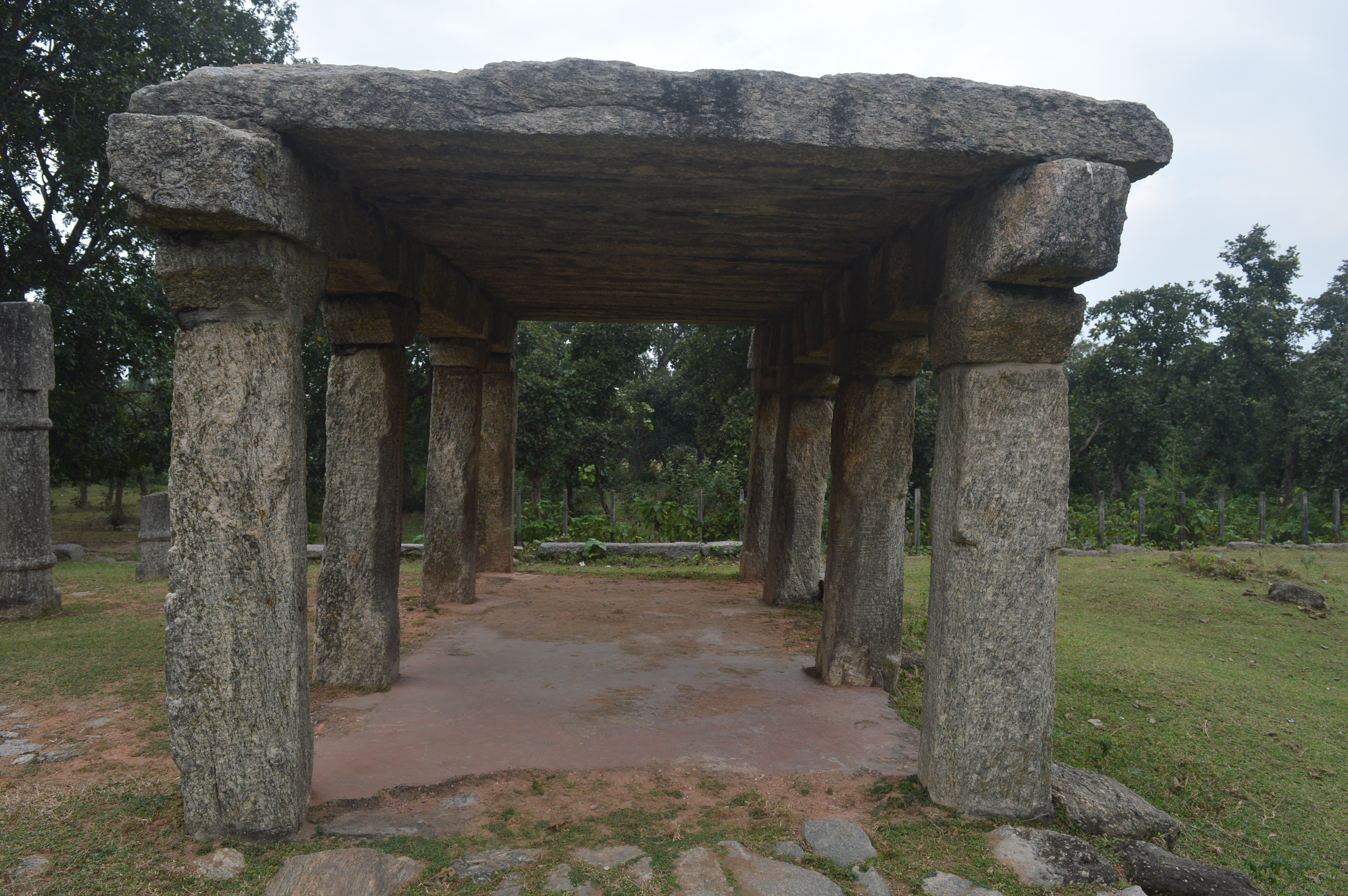
Mandapa in front of the temple of Banda
