= Lapara, Purulia =

Lapara
- Census Town
- Location in West Bengal, India Lapara (India)
- Coordinates: 23.4220°N 86.6622°E
- Country: India
- State: West Bengal
- District: Purulia

Area
  - Total: 3.2294 km^{2} (1.2469 sq mi)

Population (2011)
  - Total: 5,367
  - Density: 1,662/km^{2} (4,304/sq mi)

Languages
  - Official: Bengali, English
- Time zone: UTC+5:30 (IST)
- PIN: 723132
- Telephone/STD code: 03251
- Lok Sabha constituency: Purulia
- Vidhan Sabha constituency: Kashipur
- Website: purulia.gov.in

Lapara is a census town in the Kashipur CD block in the Raghunathpur subdivision of the Purulia district in the state of West Bengal, India.

== Geography ==
Places in Raghunathpur subdivision in Purulia district
M: municipal town, CT: census town, R: rural/ urban centre, H: historical/ religious centre, T: tourist centre
Owing to space constraints in the small map, the actual locations in a larger map may vary slightly

=== Location ===
Lapara is located at 23.4220°N 86.6622°E.

=== Area overview ===
Purulia district forms the lowest step of the Chota Nagpur Plateau. The general scenario is undulating land with scattered hills. Raghunathpur subdivision occupies the northern part of the district. 83.80% of the population of the subdivision lives in rural areas. However, there are pockets of urbanization and 16.20% of the population lives in urban areas. There are 14 census towns in the subdivision. It is presented in the map given alongside. There is a coal mining area around Parbelia and two thermal power plants are there – the 500 MW Santaldih Thermal Power Station and the 1200 MW Raghunathpur Thermal Power Station. The subdivision has a rich heritage of old temples, some of them belonging to the 11th century or earlier. The Banda Deul is a monument of national importance. The comparatively more recent in historical terms, Panchkot Raj has interesting and intriguing remains in the area.

Note: The map alongside presents some of the notable locations in the subdivision. All places marked in the map are linked in the larger full screen map.

== Demographics ==
According to the 2011 Census of India, Lapara had a total population of 5,367, of which 2,731 (51%) were males and 2,636 (49%) were females. There were 632 persons in the age range of 0–6 years. The total number of literate persons in Lapara was 3,372 (72.21% of the population over 6 years).

== Infrastructure ==
According to the District Census Handbook 2011, Puruliya, Lapara covered an area of 3.2294 km^{2}. There is a railway station at Adra 7 km away. Among the civic amenities, the protected water supply involved tap water from treated sources. It had 935 domestic electric connections and 41 road lighting points. Among the medical facilities it had 1 dispensary/ health centre, 1 family welfare centre, 1 veterinary hospital, 2 medicine shops. Among the educational facilities it had were 4 primary schools, 1 middle school, the nearest secondary school, the nearest senior secondary school, at Rangildih 0.3 km away. It had 1 non-formal education centre (Sarva Siksha Abhiyan centre). It had the branch of 1 co-operative bank.

== Education ==
Kashipur Michael Madhusudhan Mahavidyalaya was established in 2000 at Kashipur.

== Healthcare ==
Kolloli Rural Hospital, with 30 beds at Panchakot Raj, is the major government medical facility in the Kashipur CD block.
