= Kantaranguri =

- Census Town
- Location in West Bengal, India Kantaranguri (India)
- Coordinates: 23.4894°N 86.6627°E
- Country: India
- State: West Bengal
- District: Purulia

Area
  - Total: 1.6228 km^{2} (0.6266 sq mi)

Population (2011)
  - Total: 5,435
  - Density: 3,349/km^{2} (8,674/sq mi)

Languages
  - Official: Bengali, English
- Time zone: UTC+5:30 (IST)
- PIN: 723121
- Telephone/STD code: 03251
- Lok Sabha constituency: Purulia
- Vidhan Sabha constituency: Kashipur
- Website: purulia.gov.in

Kantaranguri is a census town in the Kashipur CD block in the Raghunathpur subdivision of the Purulia district in the state of West Bengal, India.

== Geography ==
Places in Raghunathpur subdivision in Purulia district
M: municipal town, CT: census town, R: rural/ urban centre, H: historical/ religious centre, T: tourist centre
Owing to space constraints in the small map, the actual locations in a larger map may vary slightly

=== Location ===
Kantaranguri is located at 23.4894°N 86.6627°E.

=== Area overview ===
Purulia district forms the lowest step of the Chota Nagpur Plateau. The general scenario is undulating land with scattered hills. Raghunathpur subdivision occupies the northern part of the district. 83.80% of the population of the subdivision lives in rural areas. However, there are pockets of urbanization and 16.20% of the population lives in urban areas. There are 14 census towns in the subdivision. It is presented in the map given alongside. There is a coal mining area around Parbelia and two thermal power plants are there – the 500 MW Santaldih Thermal Power Station and the 1200 MW Raghunathpur Thermal Power Station. The subdivision has a rich heritage of old temples, some of them belonging to the 11th century or earlier. The Banda Deul is a monument of national importance. The comparatively more recent in historical terms, Panchkot Raj has interesting and intriguing remains in the area.

Note: The map alongside presents some of the notable locations in the subdivision. All places marked in the map are linked in the larger full screen map.

== Demographics ==
According to the 2011 Census of India, Kantaranguri had a total population of 5,435, of which 2,736 (50%) were males and 2,699 (50%) were females. There were 472 persons in the age range of 0–6 years. The total number of literate persons in Kantaranguri was 4,445 (89.56% of the population over 6 years).

== Infrastructure ==
According to the District Census Handbook 2011, Puruliya, Kantaranguri covered an area of 1.6228 km^{2}. Among the civic amenities, the protected water supply involved tap water from treated sources. It had 1,081 domestic electric connections. Among the medical facilities it had a dispensary/ health centre 1 km away, a nursing home 6 km away, 25 medicine shops. Among the educational facilities it had were 2 primary schools, 1 middle school, the nearest secondary school, the nearest senior secondary school, at Raniganj 0.5 km away, the nearest degree college at Kashipur 8 km away.

== Education ==
Beko Anchal High School is a Bengali-medium coeducational institution established in 1967. It has facilities for teaching from class V to class XII.

Vidyasagar Vidyapith is a Bengali-medium coeducational institution established in 1996. It has facilities for teaching from class V to class X.

== Healthcare ==
There is a primary health centre at Kantaranguri (PO Beko), with 6 beds.
