= Baranti =

- Village
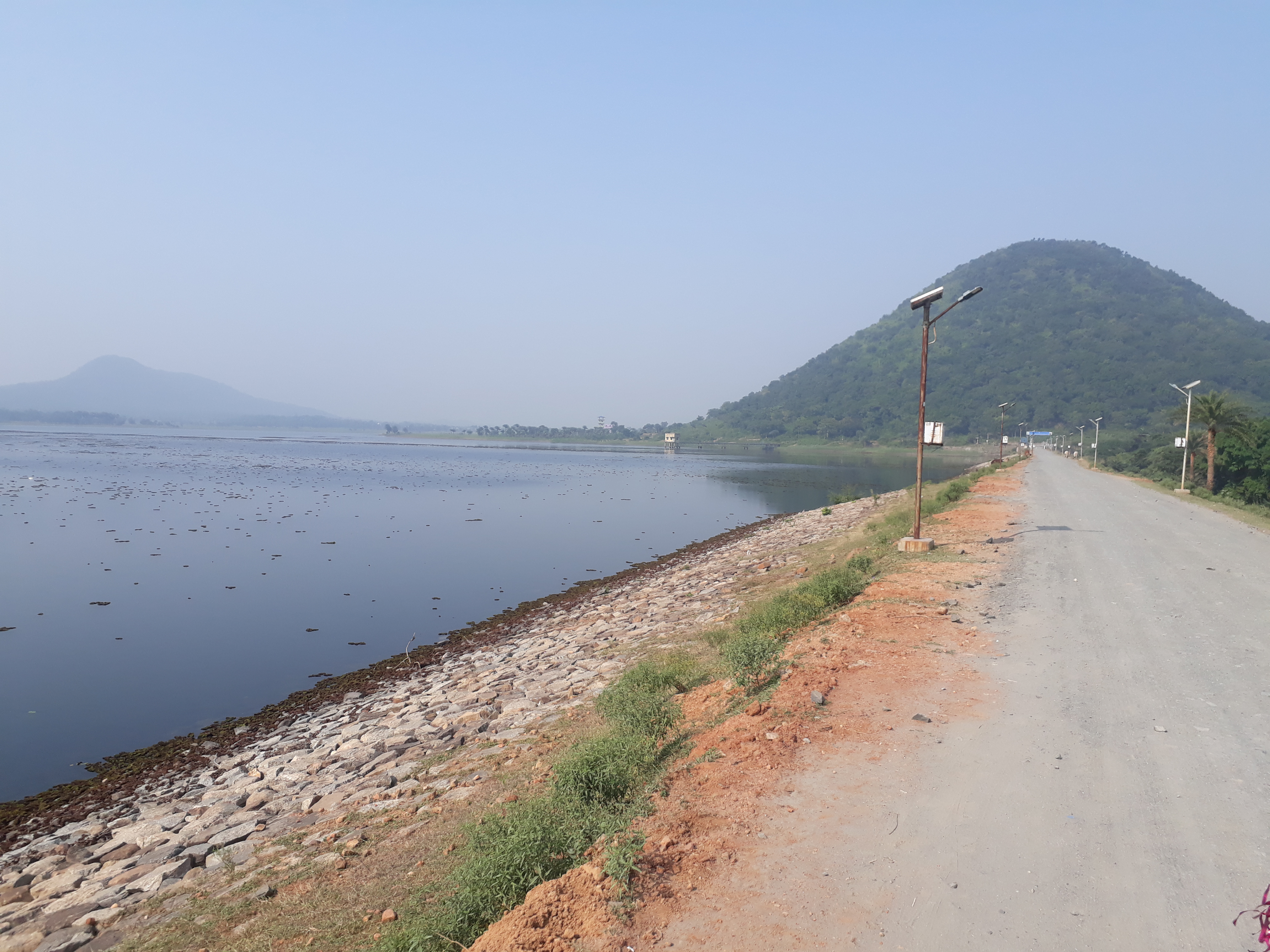
- Baranti Lake

- Location in West Bengal, India Baranti (India)
- Coordinates: 23.5811°N 86.8463°E
- Country: India
- State: West Bengal
- District: Purulia
- Subdivision: Raghunathpur subdivision

Languages
  - Official: Bengali, English
- Time zone: UTC+5:30 (IST)
- Police Station: Santuri

Baranti is a small tribal village in the Santuri (community development block) in the Raghunathpur subdivision of the Purulia district in the Indian state of West Bengal. It is situated beside Baranti Lake. This is a growing but quiet tourist spot.

== Geography ==
Places in Raghunathpur subdivision in Purulia district
M: municipal town, CT: census town, R: rural/ urban centre, H: historical/ religious centre, T: tourist centre
Owing to space constraints in the small map, the actual locations in a larger map may vary slightly

=== Location ===
Baranti is located at 23.5811°N 86.8463°E.

=== Area overview ===
Purulia district forms the lowest step of the Chota Nagpur Plateau. The general scenario is undulating land with scattered hills. Panchet Hill rises to a height of 1,600 feet (490 m). The Damodar forms the northern boundary of the district, but the Panchet Dam across the river is in Dhanbad district of Jharkhand.Raghunathpur subdivision occupies the northern part of the district. 83.80% of the population of the subdivision lives in rural areas. However, there are pockets of urbanization and 16.20% of the population lives in urban areas. There are 14 census towns in the subdivision. It is presented in the map given alongside. There is a coal mining area around Parbelia and two thermal power plants are there – the 500 MW Santaldih Thermal Power Station and the 1200 MW Raghunathpur Thermal Power Station. The subdivision has a rich heritage of old temples, some of them belonging to the 11th century or earlier. The Banda Deul is a monument of national importance. The comparatively more recent in historical terms, Panchkot Raj has interesting and intriguing remains in the area.

Note: The map alongside presents some of the notable locations in the subdivision. All places marked in the map are linked in the larger full screen map.

== Transport ==
The nearest railway connection of Baranti is Muradi railway station (6 km) on the Asansol-Adra line of South Eastern Railway zone. Bus and cars are available through the district headquarters Purulia to nearby Muraddi.

== Tourism ==
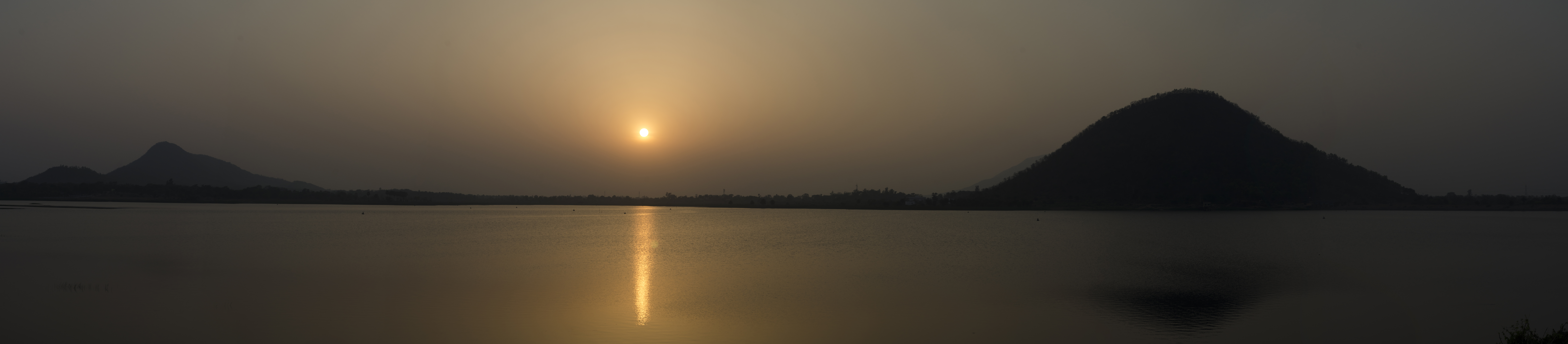
Sunset at Baranti Lake

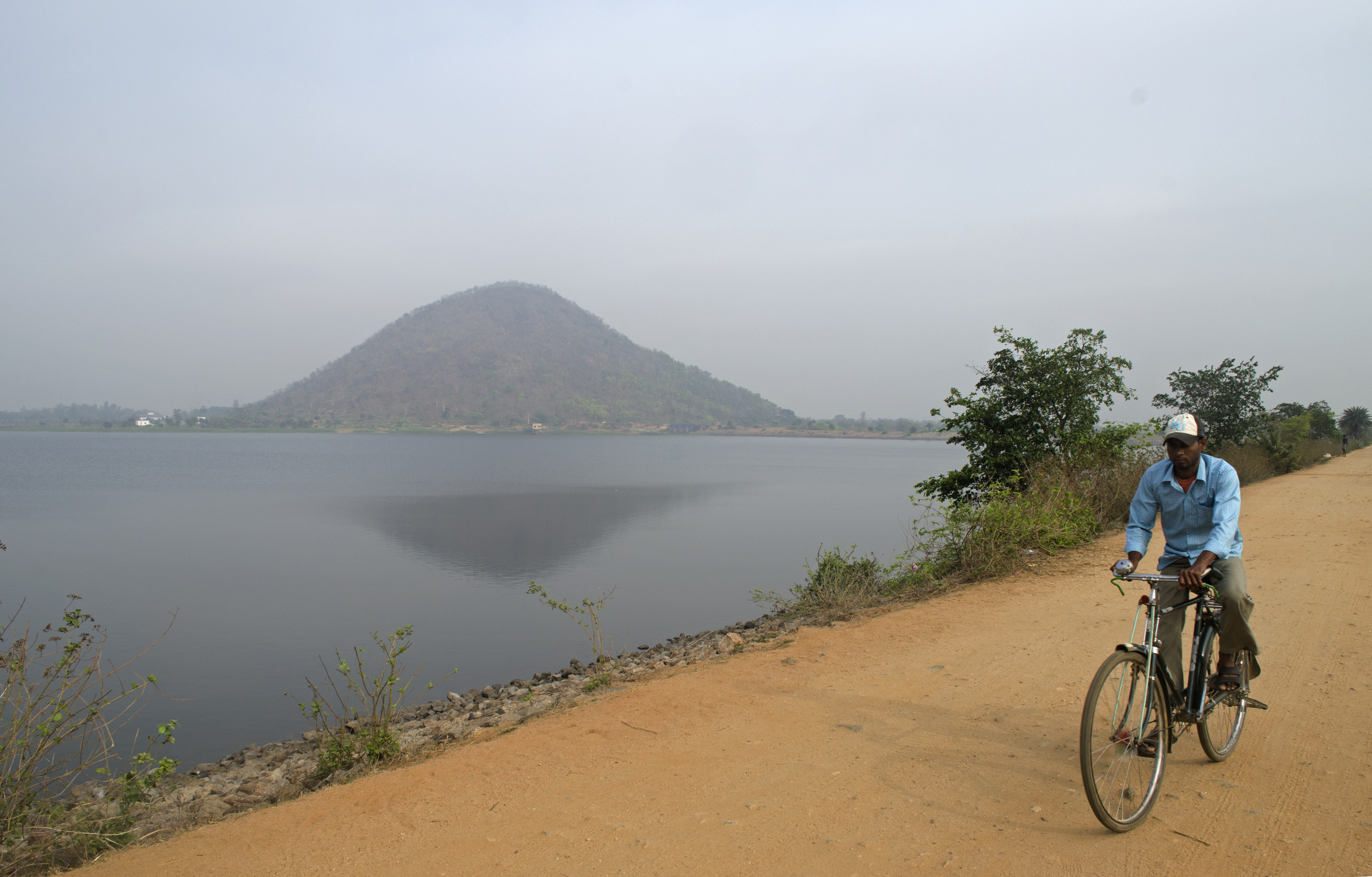
Baranti Lake

Baranti is a developing tourist center located in the lap of Gorongi Hill. This village is surrounded by the Panchkot Hill at one side and the Biharinath Hill on the other, with a water reservoir under Ramchandrapur Medium Irrigation Project. This area is popular for hill and jungle trekking due to its natural environment. Garh Panchkot is only 12 km away, and Joychandi Pahar just 21 km away from Baranti. Biharinath, the Araku Valley of Bengal is just 18 km from Baranti.

The place has been aptly described in The Telegraph, "right in the lap of a hilly range with a huge water reservoir...Sunset is particularly special in Baranti. The lake keeps changing colour from time to time. It's a real treat for the eyes to sit and watch the various shades of yellow and red reflected on the water and quietly spreading out on to the paddy fields... The huge water body around the dam attracts a lot of migratory birds every winter."

In recent years, a large number of resorts have come up in Baranti turning the place into a tourist hub. The tourist inflow is high during the winter months when the temperature is favourable. During the spring the blooming Palash flowers turn the area into a bright shade of red.

== Gallery ==
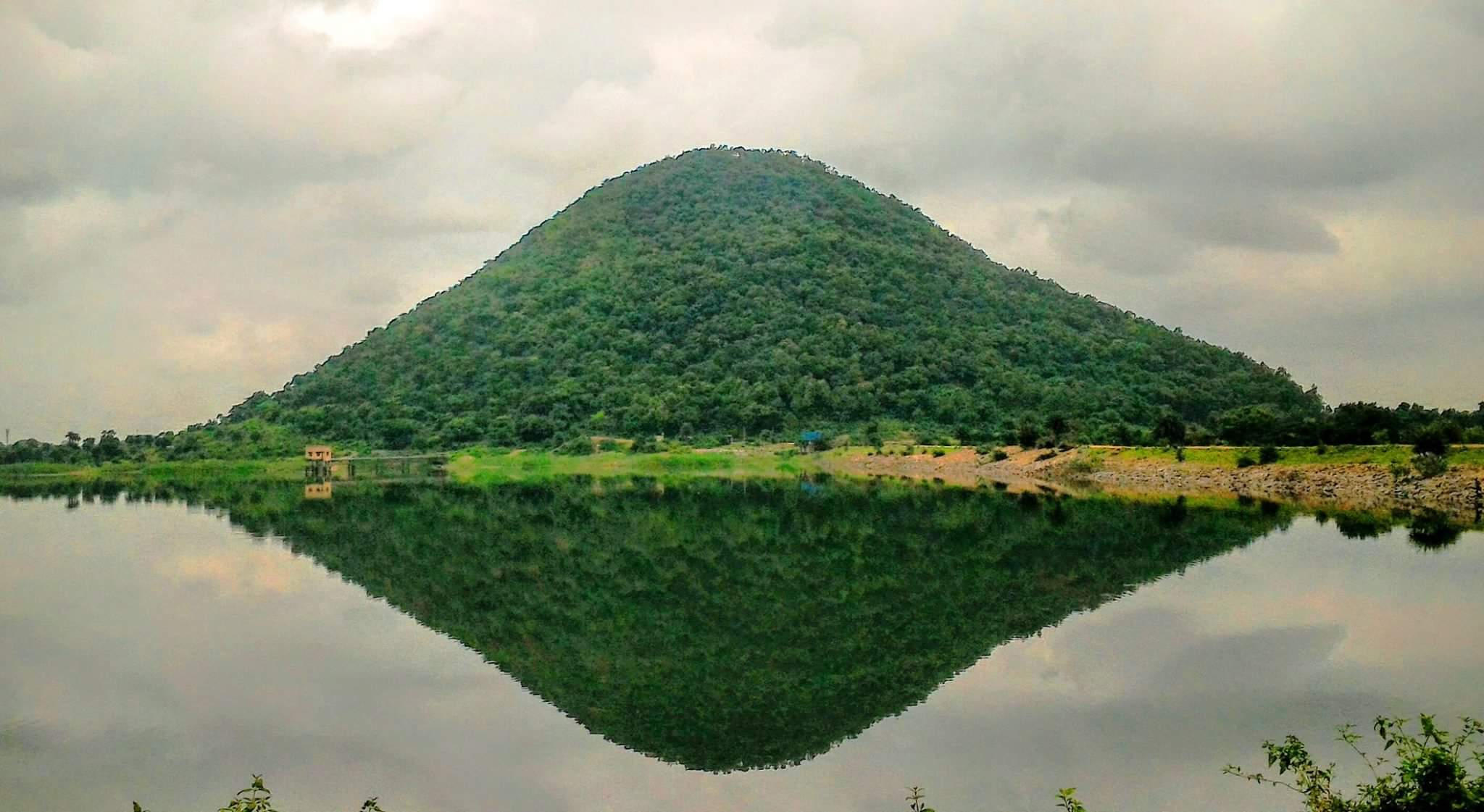
Reflection at Baranti

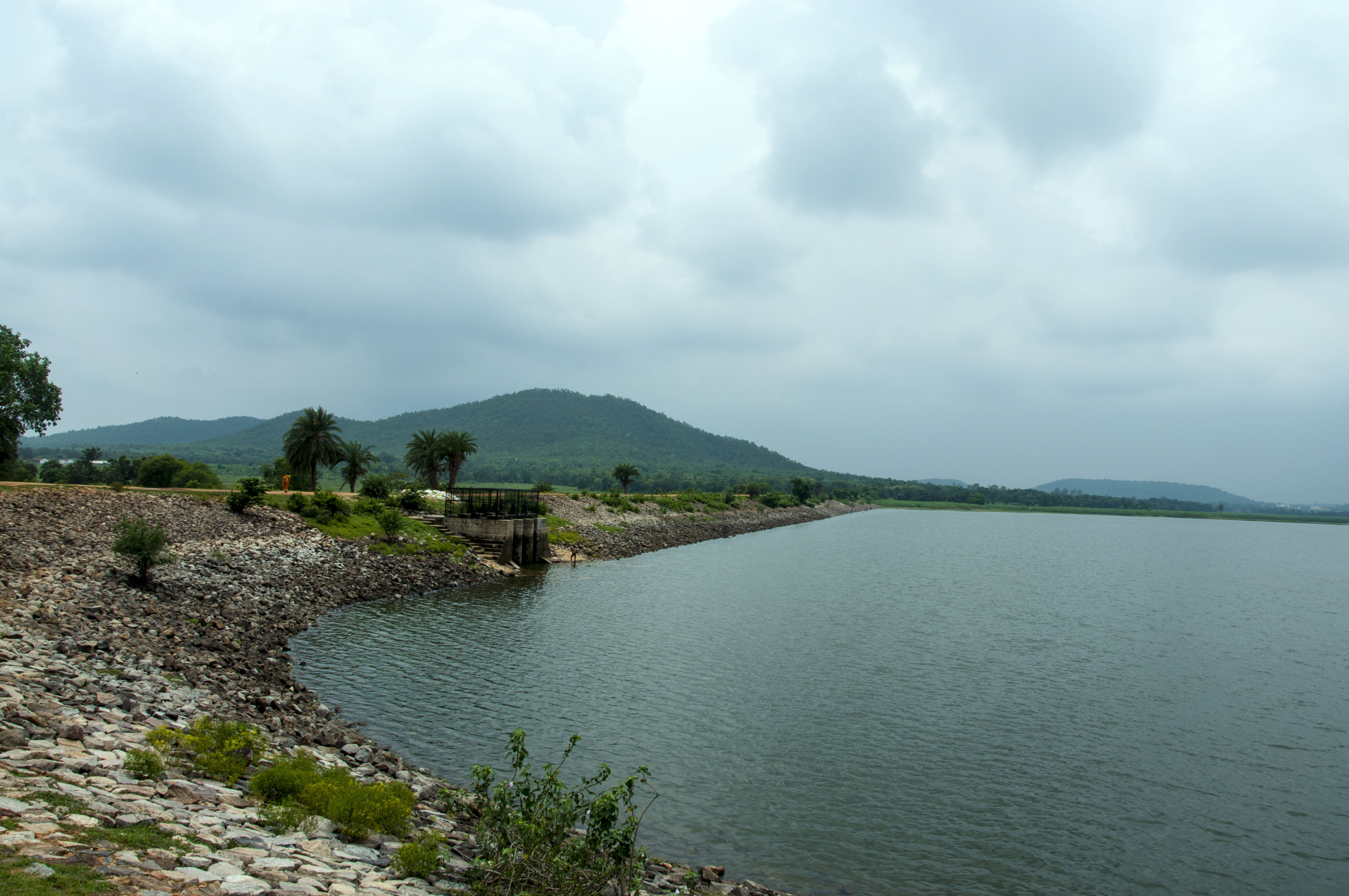
A panoramic view

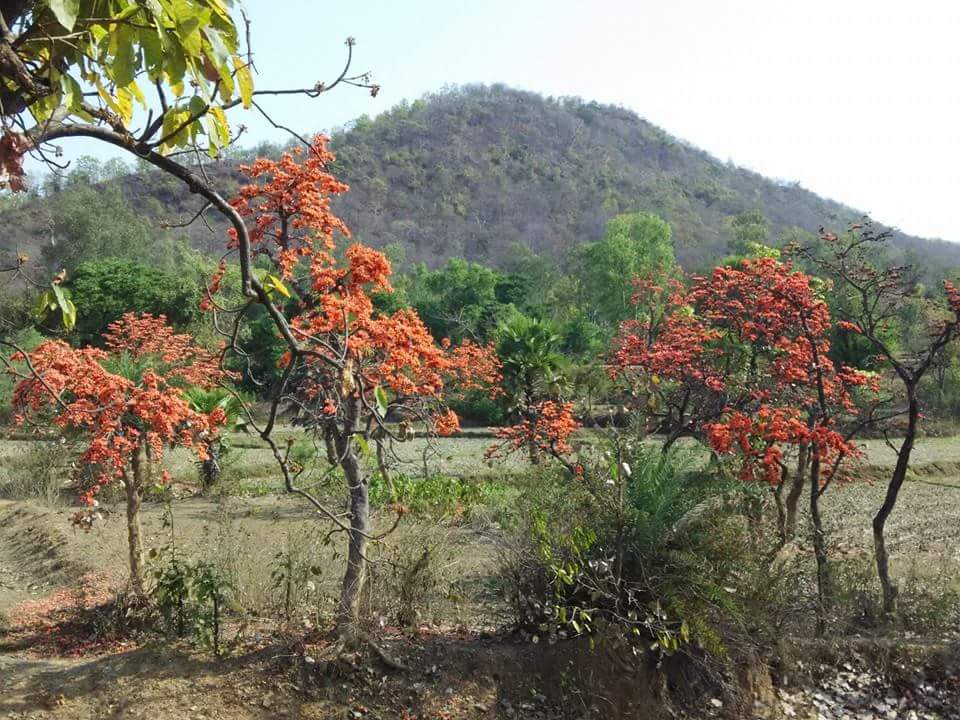
Palash in bloom

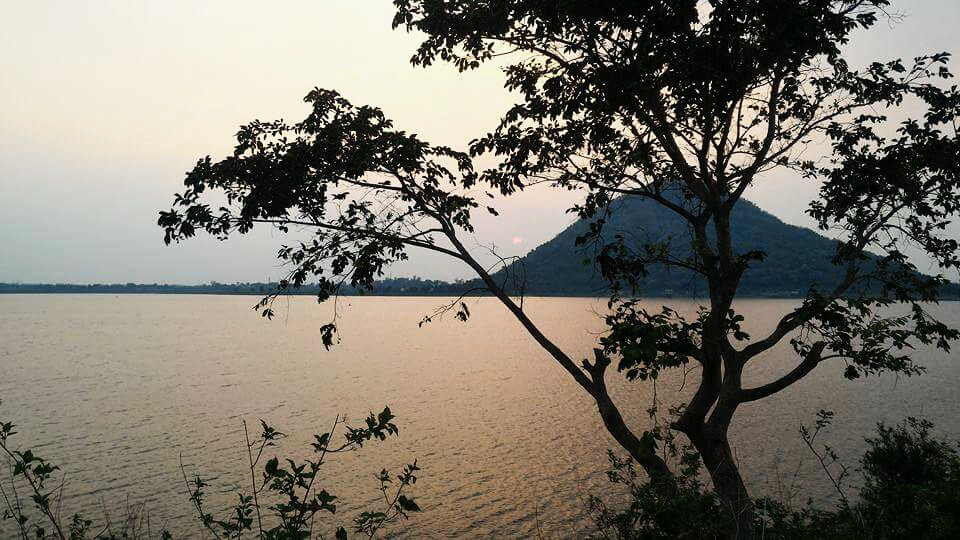
The day comes to an end

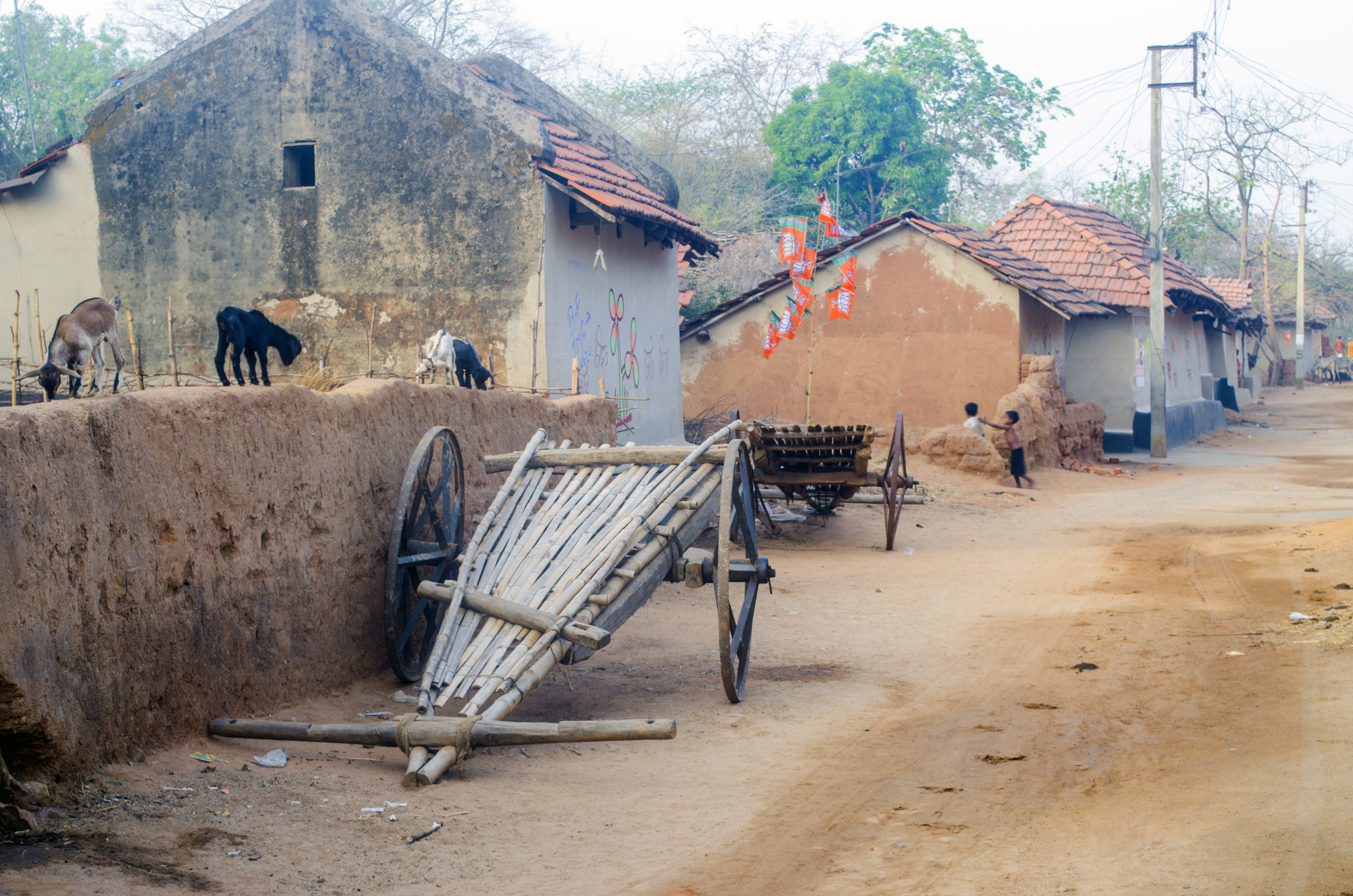
Baranti village

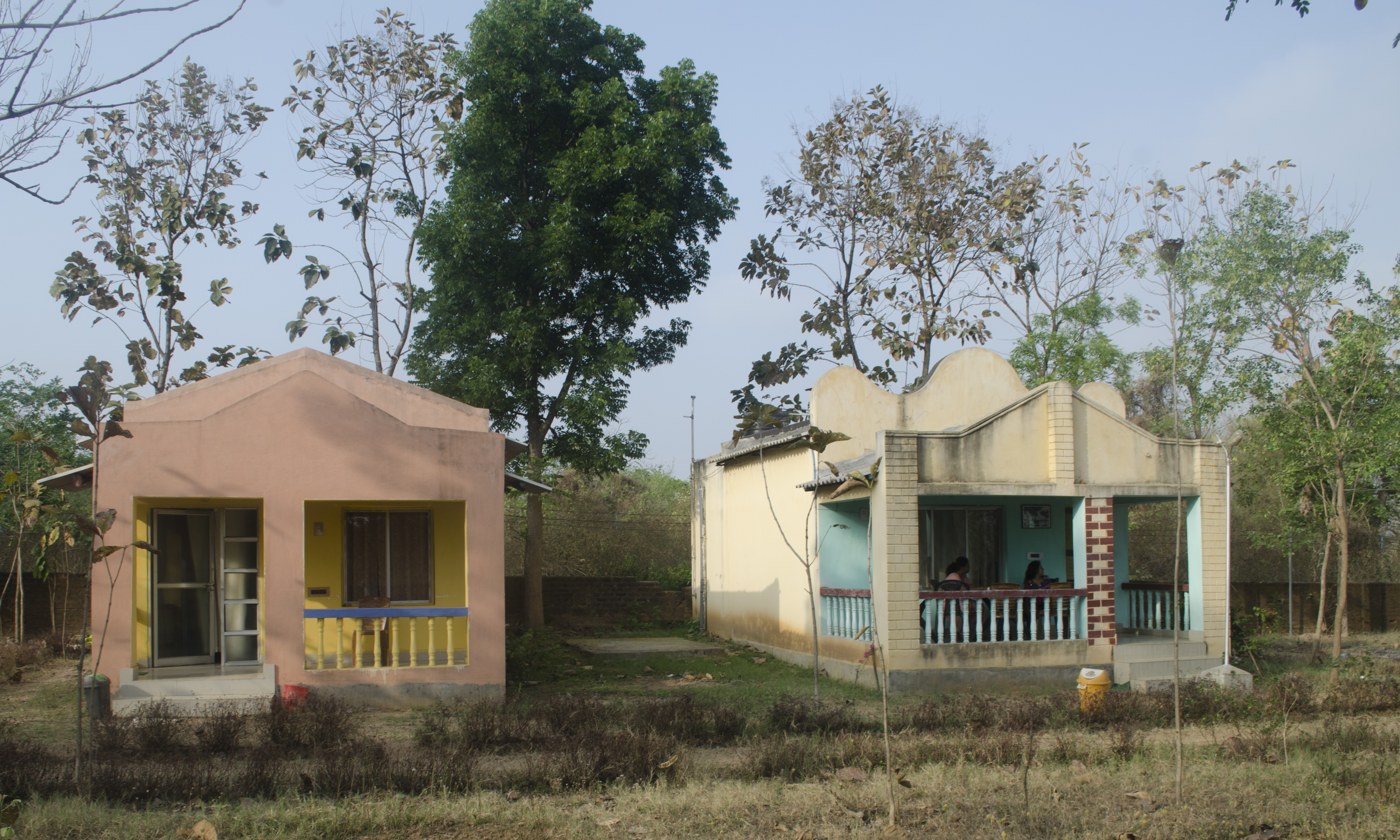
Resort at Baranti
