= Murulia =

- Census Town
- Location in West Bengal, India Murulia (India)
- Coordinates: 23.6111°N 86.8393°E
- Country: India
- State: West Bengal
- District: Purulia

Area
  - Total: 3.9068 km^{2} (1.5084 sq mi)

Population (2011)
  - Total: 5,929
  - Density: 1,518/km^{2} (3,931/sq mi)

Languages
  - Official: Bengali, English
- Time zone: UTC+5:30 (IST)
- PIN: 723121
- Telephone/STD code: 03251
- Lok Sabha constituency: Bankura
- Vidhan Sabha constituency: Raghunathpur
- Website: purulia.gov.in

Murulia is a census town in the Santuri CD block in the Raghunathpur subdivision of the Purulia district in the state of West Bengal, India.

== Geography ==
Places in Raghunathpur subdivision in Purulia district
M: municipal town, CT: census town, R: rural/ urban centre, H: historical/ religious centre, T: tourist centre
Owing to space constraints in the small map, the actual locations in a larger map may vary slightly

=== Location ===
Murulia is located at 23.6111°N 86.8393°E.

=== Area overview ===
Purulia district forms the lowest step of the Chota Nagpur Plateau. The general scenario is undulating land with scattered hills. Raghunathpur subdivision occupies the northern part of the district. 83.80% of the population of the subdivision lives in rural areas. However, there are pockets of urbanization and 16.20% of the population lives in urban areas. There are 14 census towns in the subdivision. It is presented in the map given alongside. There is a coal mining area around Parbelia and two thermal power plants are there – the 500 MW Santaldih Thermal Power Station and the 1200 MW Raghunathpur Thermal Power Station. The subdivision has a rich heritage of old temples, some of them belonging to the 11th century or earlier. The Banda Deul is a monument of national importance. The comparatively more recent in historical terms, Panchkot Raj has interesting and intriguing remains in the area.

Note: The map alongside presents some of the notable locations in the subdivision. All places marked in the map are linked in the larger full screen map.

== Demographics ==
According to the 2011 Census of India, Murulia had a total population of 5,929, of which 3,090 (52%) were males and 2,839 (48%) were females. There were 1,314 persons in the age range of 0–6 years. The total number of literate persons in Murulia was 2,371 (51.38% of the population over 6 years).

== Infrastructure ==
According to the District Census Handbook 2011, Puruliya, Murulia covered an area of 3.9068 km^{2}. There is a railway station at Muraddi, 6 km away. Among the civic amenities, the protected water supply involved hand pumps. It had 347 domestic electric connections. Among the medical facilities it had 1 dispensaries/ health centres, 1 family welfare centre, 1 maternity and child welfare centre, 4 medicine shops. Among the educational facilities it had were 2 primary schools, the nearest middle school, the nearest secondary school, the nearest senior secondary school, all at Muraddi, the nearest degree college at Asansol 35 km away. Three important commodities it manufactured were paddy, puffed rice and beedi.

== Healthcare ==
Muraddi Rural Hospital, with 30 beds at Muraddi, is the major government medical facility in the Santuri CD block.

Ramchandrapur Netaji Eye and General Hospital, at Ramchandrapur, functioning under the Health and Family Welfare department of the Government of West Bengal, established in 1953, is a 242 bedded eye care institution. 10,790 patients are treated in-door annually and 130,000 patients attend the Out Patient's Department.
