= Swapan Kumar Beltharia =

Indian politician

Swapan Kumar Beltharia (born 2 February 1961) is an Indian politician from West Bengal. He is a former two time member of the West Bengal Legislative Assembly from Kashipur, West Bengal Assembly constituency in Purulia district. He was elected in the 2011 and 2016 West Bengal Legislative Assembly election representing the All India Trinamool Congress.

== Early life and education ==
Beltharia is from Kalloli, Kashipur, Purulia district, West Bengal. He is the son of late Nandagopal Beltharia. He passed the Class 8 examinations at Rangamati Ranjandih High School. Later, he discontinued his studies and started his own business.

== Career ==
Beltharia was first elected as an MLA in the Kashipur, West Bengal Assembly constituency representing the All India Trinamool Congress in the 2011 West Bengal Legislative Assembly election. He polled 69.492 votes and defeated his nearest rival, Subhas Chandra Mahata of the Communist Party of India (Marxist), by a margin of 3,721 votes. He retained the Kashipur seat for the Trinamool Congress winning the 2016 West Bengal Legislative Assembly election. In 2016, he got 87,483 votes and defeated his closest opponent, Sudin Kisku of the Communist Party of India (Marxist), by a margin of 19,578 votes. However, he lost the 2021 West Bengal Legislative Assembly election to Kamalakanta Hansda of the Bharatiya Janata Party by a margin of 7,387 votes.
