= Panchet (disambiguation) =

Panchet may refer to:

== Places ==
- Panchet, is a town in Dhanbad district in the Indian state of Jharkhand.
- Panchet Dam, in Dhanbad district in the Indian state of Jharkhand.
- Panchet Hill, in the Indian state of West Bengal.

== Other ==
- House of Pachet in Eastern Manbhum.
- Pachet Raja claims to be a Go-banshi Rajput.

== See also ==
- Pachet
