= Hura Assembly constituency =

Coordinates: 23°18′N 86°39′E

Hura
- Former constituency No. 243 for the West Bengal Legislative Assembly

Constituency details
- Country: India
- Region: East India
- State: West Bengal
- District: Purulia
- Lok Sabha constituency: Bankura
- Established: 1962
- Abolished: 2011
- Reservation: None

Hura Assembly constituency was an assembly constituency in Purulia district in the Indian state of West Bengal.

== Overview ==
As a consequence of the orders of the Delimitation Commission, Hura Assembly constituency ceased to exist from 2011.

It was part of Bankura (Lok Sabha constituency).

For Members of Legislative Assembly from Hura Assembly constituency see Kashipur, West Bengal Assembly constituency

== Election results ==
=== 1977-2006 ===
In the 2006 elections to the state assembly, Subhas Chandra Mahata of CPI(M) won the Hura assembly seat defeating his nearest rival Baghambar Mahato of Trinamool Congress. Abinas Mahata of CPI(M) defeated Bikash Chandra Mahato of Trinamool Congress in 2001 and Baghambar Mahato representing JMM in 1996. Ambarish Mukhopadhyay of CPI(M) defeated Madan Mohan Mahato of Congress in 1991, Bikash Mahato of Congress in 1987, Bhola Nath Mahato of ICS in 1982, and Raj Rajeshwari Prasad Singhdeo of Janata Party in 1977.

=== 1962-1972 ===
Satadal Mahto of Congress won in 1972 and 1971. Saharendra Ojha of Lok Sewak Sangh won in 1969 and 1967. Ajit Prasad Singh Deo of Congress won in 1962. Prior to that the Hura seat did not exist.
