= Santuri (community development block) =

- Community development block
- Location in West Bengal
- Coordinates: 23°31′44″N 86°51′50″E
- Country: India
- State: West Bengal
- District: Purulia
- Parliamentary constituency: Bankura
- Assembly constituency: Raghunathpur

Area
  - Total: 179.69 km^{2} (69.38 sq mi)
- Elevation: 148 m (486 ft)

Population (2011)
  - Total: 78,515
  - Density: 436.95/km^{2} (1,131.7/sq mi)

Languages
  - Official: Bengali, Santali, English
- Time zone: UTC+5.30 (IST)
- PIN: 723157 (Santuri); 723156 (Murardih)
- Telephone/STD code: 03251
- Vehicle registration: WB-55, WB-56
- Literacy Rate: 64.15 per cent
- Website: http://purulia.gov.in/

Santuri is a community development block (CD block) that forms an administrative division in the Raghunathpur subdivision of the Purulia district in the Indian state of West Bengal.

== History ==
=== Background ===
The Jaina Bhagavati-Sutra of the 5th century AD mentions that Purulia was one of the sixteen Mahajanapadas and was a part of the kingdom known as Vajra-bhumi in ancient times. In 1833, the Manbhum district was carved out of the Jungle Mahals district, with headquarters at Manbazar. In 1838, the headquarters was transferred to Purulia. After independence, when Manbhum district was a part of Bihar, efforts were made to impose Hindi on the Bengali-speaking majority of the district and it led to the Bengali Language Movement (Manbhum). In 1956, the Manbhum district was partitioned between Bihar and West Bengal under the States Reorganization Act and the Bihar and West Bengal (Transfer of Territories) Act 1956.

== Geography ==
CD blocks in Purulia district

Santuri is located at 23°31′44″N 86°51′50″E.

The Santuri CD block is located in the north-eastern part of the district. The Damodar marks the northern boundary of the CD block. The Damodar Dwaraka upland is an extension of the Chota Nagpur Plateau. The area is undulating with hillocks of hard rocks.

The Santuri CD block is bounded by the Asansol Municipal Corporation, in the Paschim Bardhaman district, across the Damodar River on the north, the Saltora CD block, in the Bankura district, on the east, the Kashipur CD block on the south and the Raghunathpur I and Neturia CD blocks on the west.

Santuri CD block has an area of 179.69 km^{2}. It has 1 panchayat samity, 6 gram panchayats, 57 gram sansads (village councils), 104 mouzas, 92 inhabited villages and 1 census town. Santuri police station serves this block. Headquarters of this CD block was at Muraddi. which had now been shifted to Talberia in a newly set up establishment since 14-02-2006.

Gram panchayats in the Santuri CD block/panchayat samiti are: Balitora, Gariska, Muraddi, Ramchandrapur-Kotaldih, Santuri and Tarbari.

== Demographics ==
=== Population ===
According to the 2011 Census of India, Santuri CD block had a total population of 78,515, of which 72,586 were rural and 5,929 were urban. There were 40,085 (51%) males and 38,430 (49%) females. There were 10,584 persons in the age range of 0 to 6 years. The Scheduled Castes numbered 20,091 (25.59%) and the Scheduled Tribes numbered 25,083 (31.95%).

According to the 2001 census, the Santuri CD block had a total population of 69,546, out of which 35,839 were males and 33,707 were females. The Santuri CD block registered a population growth of 9.36 per cent during the 1991-2001 decade. Decadal growth for the Purulia district was 13.96 per cent. Decadal growth in West Bengal was 17.84 per cent.

Census towns in the Santuri CD block are (2011 census figures in brackets): Murulia (5,929).

Villages in the Santuri CD block are (2011 census figures in brackets): Santuri (2,700), Muraddi (2,321), Gorsika (1,741), Tarabari (1,772), Ramchandrapur (2,648), Kotaldih (1,663) and Balora (3,206).

=== Literacy ===
According to the 2011 census the total number of literate persons in the Santuri CD block was 43,604 (64.15% of the population over 6 years) out of which males numbered 26,495 (76.32% of the male population over 6 years) and females numbered 17,109 (51.45%) of the female population over 6 years). The gender disparity (the difference between female and male literacy rates) was 24.87%.

See also – List of West Bengal districts ranked by literacy rate

Literacy in CD blocks of
Purulia district
Purulia Sadar subdivision
Arsha – 57.48%
Balarampur – 60.40%
Hura – 68.79%
Purulia I – 78.37%
Purulia II – 63.39%
Manbazar subdivision
Barabazar – 63.27
Bandwan – 61.38%
Manbazar I – 63.78%
Manbazar II – 60.27%
Puncha – 68.14%
Jhalda subdivision
Baghmundi – 57.17%
Jhalda I – 66.18%
Jhalda II – 54.76%
Joypur – 57.94%
Raghunathpur subdivision
Para – 65.62%
Raghunathpur I – 67.36%
Raghunathpur II – 67.29%
Neturia – 65.14%
Santuri – 64.15%
Kashipur – 71.06%
2011 Census: CD Block Wise

Primary Census Abstract Data

=== Language and religion ===
Religion in Santuri CD block (2011)
Hinduism	70.71%
Other (tribal religion)	20.51%
Islam	8.00%
Other or not stated	0.42%

In the 2011 census, Hindus numbered 55,510 and formed 70.71% of the population in the Santuri CD block. Muslims numbered 6,282 and formed 8.00% of the population. Others numbered 16,723 and formed 21.30% of the population. Others include Addi Bassi, Marang Boro, Santal, Saranath, Sari Dharma, Sarna, Alchchi, Bidin, Sant, Saevdharm, Seran, Saran, Sarin, Kheria, and other religious communities. In 2001, Hindus were 66.88%, Muslims 7.34% and tribal religions 25.33% of the population respectively.

Languages of Santuri CD block (2011)
1. Bengali (66.3%)
2. Santali (30.4%)
3. Urdu (2.65%)
4. Others (0.66%)

At the time of the 2011 census, 66.32% of the population spoke Bengali, 30.37% Santali and 2.65% Urdu as their first language.

== Rural Poverty ==
According to the Rural Household Survey in 2005, 32.85% of total number of families were BPL families in Purulia district. According to a World Bank report, as of 2012, 31-38% of the population in Purulia, Murshidabad and Uttar Dinajpur districts were below poverty level, the highest among the districts of West Bengal, which had an average 20% of the population below poverty line.

== Economy ==
=== Livelihood ===
Livelihood
in Santuri CD block
1. Cultivators (21.3%)
2. Agricultural labourers (30.3%)
3. Household industries (3.37%)
4. Other Workers (45.0%)

In the Santuri CD block in 2011, among the class of total workers, cultivators numbered 6,274 and formed 21.28%, agricultural labourers numbered 9,837 and formed 33.36%, household industry workers numbered 994 and formed 3.37% and other workers numbered 12,378 and formed 41.98%. Total workers numbered 29,483 and formed 37.55% of the total population, and non-workers numbered 49,032 and formed 62.45% of the population.

Note: In the census records a person is considered a cultivator, if the person is engaged in cultivation/ supervision of land owned by self/government/institution. When a person who works on another person's land for wages in cash or kind or share, is regarded as an agricultural labourer. Household industry is defined as an industry conducted by one or more members of the family within the household or village, and one that does not qualify for registration as a factory under the Factories Act. Other workers are persons engaged in some economic activity other than cultivators, agricultural labourers and household workers. It includes factory, mining, plantation, transport and office workers, those engaged in business and commerce, teachers, entertainment artistes and so on.

=== Infrastructure ===
There are 92 inhabited villages in the Santuri CD block, as per the District Census Handbook, Puruliya, 2011, 100% villages have power supply. 100% villages have drinking water supply. 19 villages (20.65%) have post offices. 83 villages (90.22%) have telephones (including landlines, public call offices and mobile phones). 36 villages (39.13%) have pucca (paved) approach roads and 44 villages (47.83%) have transport communication (includes bus service, rail facility and navigable waterways). 2 villages (2.17%) have agricultural credit societies and 8 villages (8.70%) have banks.

=== Industry ===
There is a cement plant, Damodhar Cement Works, owned by ACC Ltd. at Madhukunda.

Other industries in Santuri CD block are: Mark Steel Private Ltd. in Jagannathdihi, Vision Sponge Iron at Madhukunda.

=== Agriculture ===
In 2013-14, persons engaged in agriculture in the Santuri CD block could be classified as follows: bargadars 3.73%, patta (document) holders 20.87%, small farmers (possessing land between 1 and 2 hectares) 2.77%, marginal farmers (possessing land up to 1 hectare) 30.70% and agricultural labourers 41.93%.

In 2013-14, the total area irrigated in the Santuri CD block was 12,154.1 hectares, out of which 4,117.16 hectares by canal water, 6,747.47 hectares by tank water, 20.59 hectares by river lift irrigation, 147.80 hectares by open dug wells and 1,121.10 hectares by other means.

In 2013-14, the Santuri CD block produced 3,001 tonnes of Aman paddy, the main winter crop, from 1,542 hectares. It also produced wheat, mustard and potatoes.

=== Banking ===
In 2013-14, the Santuri CD block had offices of 3 commercial banks and 2 gramin banks.

=== Backward Regions Grant Fund ===
The Purulia district is listed as a backward region and receives financial support from the Backward Regions Grant Fund. The fund, created by the Government of India, is designed to redress regional imbalances in development. As of 2012, 272 districts across the country were listed under this scheme. The list includes 11 districts of West Bengal.

== Transport ==
In 2013-14, the Santuri CD block had 3 originating/ terminating bus routes.

State Highway 8 running from Santaldih (in the Purulia district) to Majhdia (in the Nadia district) passes through this CD block.

The Asansol-Adra line of the South Eastern Railway passes through this block and there are stations at Madhukunda and Muradi.

== Education ==
In 2013-14, the Santuri CD block had 89 primary schools with 6,682 students, 13 middle schools with 999 students, 6 high schools with 2,321 students and 6 higher secondary schools with 4,601 students. Santuri CD Block had 176 institutions with 4,230 students for special and non-formal education.

See also – Education in India

According to the 2011 census, in Santuri CD block, amongst the 92 inhabited villages, 13 villages did not have a school, 18 villages had two or more primary schools, 24 villages had at least 1 primary and 1 middle school and 17 villages had at least 1 middle and 1 secondary school.

== Healthcare ==
In 2014, the Santuri CD block had 1 block primary health centre, 2 primary health centres and 1 private nursing home, with total 296 beds and 24 doctors. 13,260 patients were treated indoor and 216,626 patients were treated outdoor in the health centres and subcentres of the CD block.

Muraddi Rural Hospital, with 30 beds at Muraddi, is the major government medical facility in the Santuri CD block. Among the other medical facilities are the Balitora Block Primary Health Centre, with 10 beds and a primary health centre, with 10 beds, at Santuri.
