= Damodar Junction railway station =

Railway station in West Bengal, India

DAMODAR JUNCTION

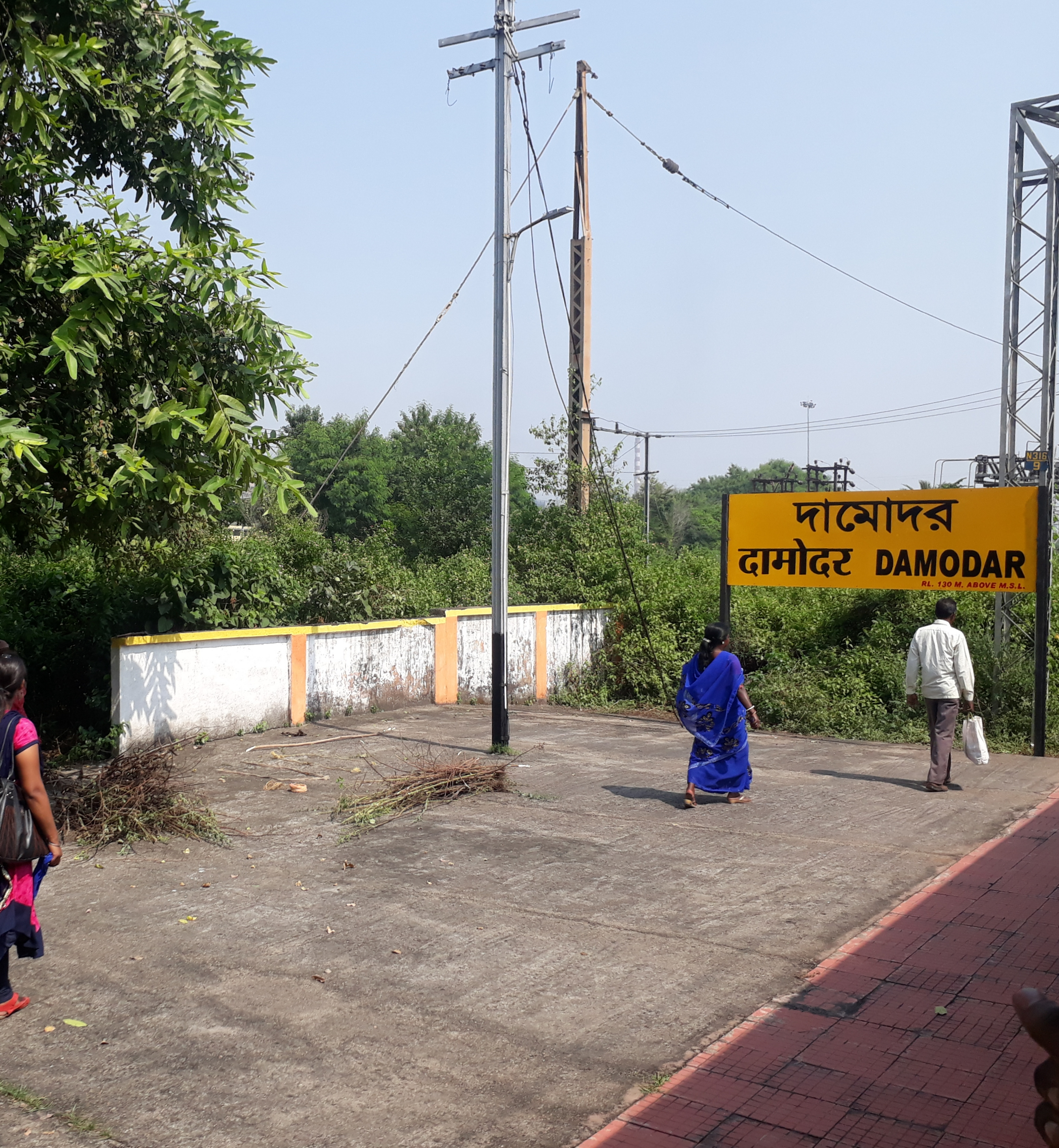
- Damodar junction sign board in Bangla, Hindi and English

General information
- Location: Damodar, Asansol, Paschim Bardhaman district, West Bengal; India
- Coordinates: 23°39′04″N 86°54′31″E
- Elevation: 115 metres (377 ft)
- System: Indian Railways station
- Owner: Indian Railways
- Operator: South Eastern Railway
- Line: Asansol–Tatanagar–Kharagpur line
- Platforms: 2

Construction
- Structure type: Standard (on ground station)
- Parking: No
- Cycle facilities: No

Other information
- Status: Functioning
- Station code: DMA
- Division(s): Adra

History
- Opened: 1891
- Electrified: 1960–61
Services
Preceding station	Indian Railways	Following station
Burnpur towards Asansol Junction	South Eastern Railway zone Asansol–Tatanagar–Kharagpur line	Madhukunda towards Kharagpur Junction
Route map
Location
- Location within West Bengal Location within India
- Interactive map of Damodar Junction

Damodar Junction is a railway station on the Asansol–Tatanagar–Kharagpur line, just east of the Damodar River. It is located in Asansol, Paschim Bardhaman district in the Indian state of West Bengal.

== History ==
The Bengal Nagpur Railway was formed in 1887 for the purpose of upgrading the Nagpur Chhattisgarh Railway and then extending it via Bilaspur to Asansol, in order to develop a shorter Howrah–Mumbai route than the one via Allahabad. The Bengal Nagpur Railway main line from Nagpur to Asansol, on the Howrah–Delhi main line, was opened for goods traffic on 1 February 1891.

== Electrification ==
The Asansol–Purulia sector was electrified in 1961–62.

== Important junction point ==
Damodar is the last station before the entry lines of the raw materials yard (Damodar Yard) of IISCO Steel Plant, which has been modernised at a cost of Rs. 16,408 crores.

To the north of Damodar railway station runs the line to numerous railway sidings for coal loading. The Damodar-Radhanagar sector of the coal sidings line was electrified in 1963–64.

To the south is the link to Kalipahari on the Bardhaman–Asansol section for freight trains (mainly iron ore rakes for Durgapur Steel Plant) to bypass Asansol . This line was electrified in 1961–62.
