= Madhukunda railway station =

Railway station in West Bengal, India

MADHUKUNDA

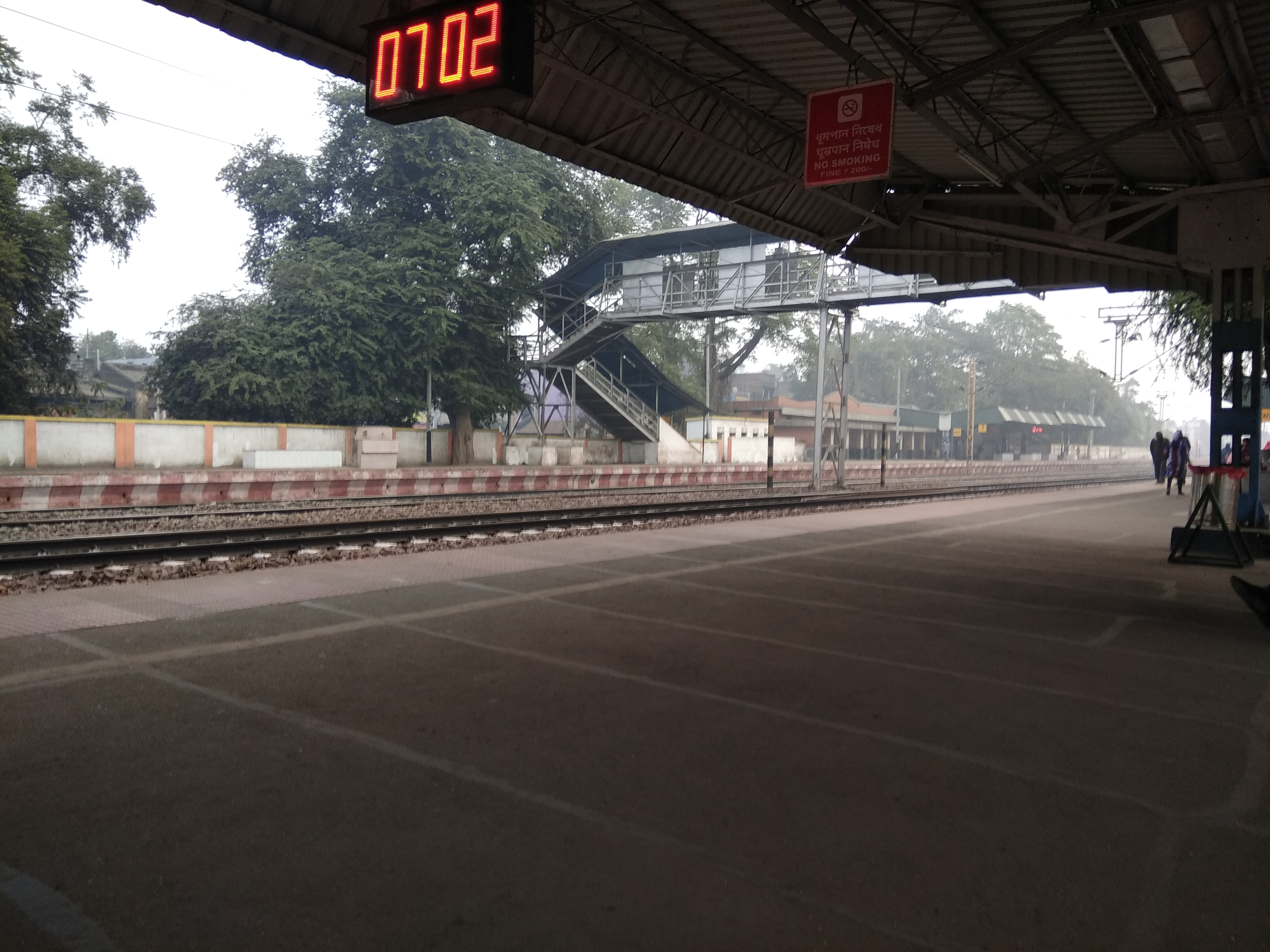

General information
- Location: Mdhukunda, Purulia district, West Bengal; India
- Coordinates: 23.6269°N 86.8695°E
- Elevation: 128 metres (420 ft)
- System: Indian Railways station
- Owner: Indian Railways
- Operator: South Eastern Railway
- Line: Asansol–Adra line
- Platforms: 2

Construction
- Structure type: At Ground
- Parking: No
- Cycle facilities: No

Other information
- Station code: MDKD
- Division(s): Adra

History
- Opened: 1891
- Electrified: 1957–62
- Former names: Bengal Nagpur Railway
Services
Preceding station	Indian Railways	Following station
Damodar towards ?	South Eastern Railway zone Asansol–Adra section	Muradi towards ?
Route map
Location
- Location within West Bengal Location within India

Madhukunda railway station serves Madhukunda, Tiluri village and surrounding areas in Purulia and Bankura districts in the Indian state of West Bengal. It is located on the southern bank of the Damodar and a railway bridge connects it to Damodar railway station.

== History ==
The Bengal Nagpur Railway main line from Nagpur to Asansol, on the Howrah–Delhi main line, was opened for goods traffic on 1 February 1891.

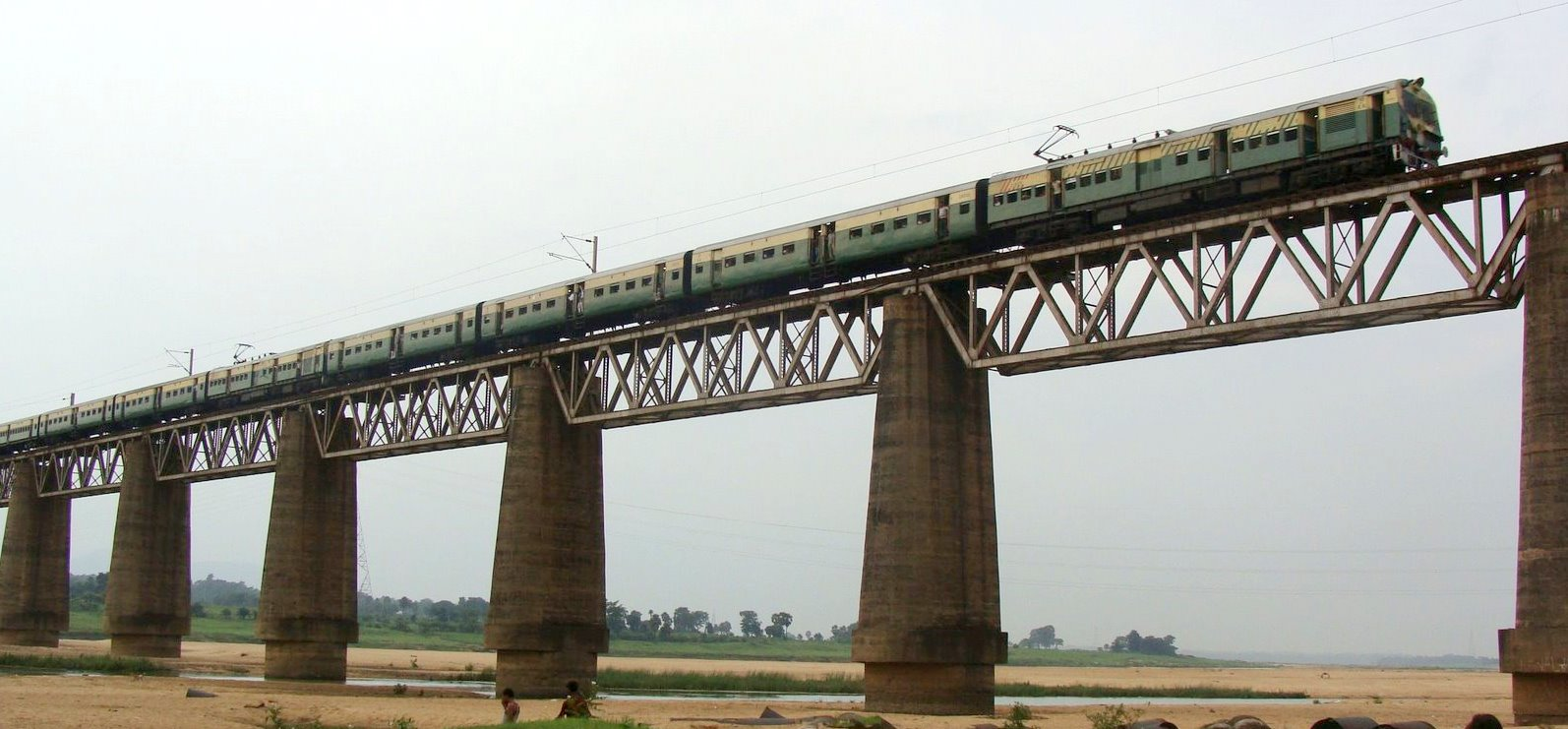
A MEMU train travelling on the bridge across Damodar River

== Electrification ==
The Tatanagar–Adra–Asansol section was electrified in the 1957–1962 period. The Asansol–Purulia sector was electrified in 1961–62.

== Economy ==
There is a cement plant, Damodhar Cement Works, owned by ACC Ltd. at Madhukunda.
