= Madan Mohan Mahato =

Indian politician (born 1927)

Madan Mohan Mahato (born 2 January 1927) was an Indian politician, belonging to the Indian National Congress.

Mahato was born on 2 January 1927 in Agardih village (Purulia District). He was the son of Joyram Mahato. He went to school at Hulmura H.E. School. Mahato worked as a school teacher. He lived in Agardih village and served as an office bearer in a number of local association there. In the Indian National Congress he served as the Kashipur Block Congress Committee Vice President and was a member of the Purulia District Congress Committee.

Mahato won the Kashipur constituency seat in the 1971 West Bengal Legislative Assembly election, obtaining 11,552 votes (38.52%). The following year he retained the Kashipur seat in the 1972 West Bengal Legislative Assembly election, obtaining 14,220 votes (57.28%).

Mahato contested the Hura constituency seat in the 1991 West Bengal Legislative Assembly election, finishing in second place with 25,439 votes (27.74%).
