= Kashipur (community development block) =

- Community development block
- Location in West Bengal
- Coordinates: 23°26′00″N 86°40′00″E
- Country: India
- State: West Bengal
- District: Purulia
- Parliamentary constituency: Purulia
- Assembly constituency: Kashipur

Area
  - Total: 451.31 km^{2} (174.25 sq mi)
- Elevation: 190 m (620 ft)

Population (2011)
  - Total: 200,083
  - Density: 443.34/km^{2} (1,148.2/sq mi)

Languages
  - Official: Bengali, Santali, English
- Time zone: UTC+5.30 (IST)
- PIN: 723132 (Panchakotraj); 723121 (Adra); 723168 (Manihara)
- Telephone/STD code: 03251
- Vehicle registration: WB-55, WB-56
- Literacy Rate: 71.06 per cent
- Website: http://purulia.gov.in/

Kashipur is a community development block (CD block) that forms an administrative division in the Raghunathpur subdivision of the Purulia district in the Indian state of West Bengal.

== History ==
=== Background ===
The Jaina Bhagavati-Sutra of the 5th century AD mentions that Purulia was one of the sixteen mahajanapadas and was a part of the kingdom known as Vajra-bhumi in ancient times. In 1833, the Manbhum district was carved out of the Jungle Mahals district, with headquarters at Manbazar. In 1838, the headquarters was transferred to Purulia. After independence, when Manbhum district was a part of Bihar, efforts were made to impose Hindi on the Bengali-speaking majority of the district and it led to the Bengali Language Movement (Manbhum). In 1956, the Manbhum district was partitioned between Bihar and West Bengal under the States Reorganization Act and the Bihar and West Bengal (Transfer of Territories) Act 1956.

== Geography ==
CD blocks in Purulia district

Kashipur is located at 23°26′N 86°40′E.

The Kashipur CD block is bounded by the Raghunathpur I and Santuri CD blocks on the north, the Chhatna CD block, in the Bankura district, on the east, the Hura CD block on the south and a part of the west, and the Para CD block on the west.

The Kashipur CD block has an area of 451.31 km^{2}. It has 1 panchayat samity, 13 gram panchayats, 137 gram sansads (village councils), 211 mouzas, 98 inhabited villages and 3 census towns. Kashipur and Adra police stations serve this block. Headquarters of this CD block are at Kalloli.

Gram panchayats in the Kashipur CD block/panchayat samiti are: Agardih-Chitra, Barrah, Beko, Gagnabaid, Gourandih, Hadalda-Upprah, Kalidaha, Kashipur, Monihara, Rangamati-Ranjandih, Simla-Dhanara, Sonajuri and Sonathali.

== Demographics ==
=== Population ===
According to the 2011 Census of India, the Kashipur CD block had a total population of 200,083, of which 174,325 were rural and 25,758 were urban. There were 101,801 (51%) males and 98,282 (49%) females. There were 23,737 persons in the age range of 0 to 6 years. The Scheduled Castes numbered 57,015 (28.50%) and the Scheduled Tribes numbered 49,537 (24.76%).

According to the 2001 census, the Kashipur block had a total population of 186,980, out of which 95,259 were males and 91,721 were females. The Kashipur CD block registered a population growth of 11.75 per cent during the 1991-2001 decade. Decadal growth for the Purulia district was 13.96 per cent. Decadal growth in West Bengal was 17.84 per cent.

Census towns in the Kashipur CD block are (2011 census figures in brackets): Kantaranguri (5,435), Adra (14,956) and Lapara (5,367).

Large villages (with 4,000+ population) in the Kashipur CD block are (2011 census figures in brackets): Palaskola (4,119).

Other villages in the Kashipur CD block are (2011 census figures in brackets): Kashipur (2,369), Uparra (1,836), Rangamatia (1,316), Barra (2,620), Sonajuri (2,624), Beko (3,149), Gagnabad (2,628), Kalidaha (2,110), Simla (2,530), Dhanera (1,165), Agardi (1,063), Sonathol (1,586), Manihara (3,104) and Gourangadih (2,246).

=== Literacy ===
According to the 2011 census the total number of literate persons in Kashipur CD block was 125,307 (71.06% of the population over 6 years) out of which males numbered 74,149 (82.83% of the male population over 6 years) and females numbered 51,128 (58.91%) of the female population over 6 years). The gender disparity (the difference between female and male literacy rates) was 23.92%.

See also – List of West Bengal districts ranked by literacy rate

Literacy in CD blocks of
Purulia district
Purulia Sadar subdivision
Arsha – 57.48%
Balarampur – 60.40%
Hura – 68.79%
Purulia I – 78.37%
Purulia II – 63.39%
Manbazar subdivision
Barabazar – 63.27
Bandwan – 61.38%
Manbazar I – 63.78%
Manbazar II – 60.27%
Puncha – 68.14%
Jhalda subdivision
Baghmundi – 57.17%
Jhalda I – 66.18%
Jhalda II – 54.76%
Joypur – 57.94%
Raghunathpur subdivision
Para – 65.62%
Raghunathpur I – 67.36%
Raghunathpur II – 67.29%
Neturia – 65.14%
Santuri – 64.15%
Kashipur – 71.06%
2011 Census: CD Block Wise

Primary Census Abstract Data

=== Language and religion ===
Religion in Kashipur CD block (2011)
Hinduism	85.71%
Other (tribal religion)	8.05%
Islam	5.16%
Christianity	0.42%
Other or not stated	0.66%

In the 2011 census, Hindus numbered 171,510 and formed 85.71% of the population in the Kashipur CD Block. Muslims numbered 10,315 and formed 5.16% of the population. Christians numbered 840 and formed 0.42% of the population. Others numbered 17,418 and formed 8.71% of the population. Others include ādivāshi, Sạri Dharma, sārnā, Sarin, Kheria, and other religious communities. In 2001, Hindus were 88.42%, Muslims 4.95%, Christians 0.61% and tribal religions 5.78% of the population respectively.

Languages of Kashipur CD block (2011)
1. Bengali (72.6%)
2. Santali (20.9%)
3. Hindi (3.30%)
4. Urdu (0.99%)
5. Telugu (0.94%)
6. Others (1.27%)

At the time of the 2011 census, 72.63% of the population spoke Bengali, 20.87% Santali, 3.30% Hindi, 0.99% Urdu and 0.94% Telugu as their first language.

== Rural Poverty ==
According to the Rural Household Survey in 2005, 32.85% of total number of families were BPL families in Purulia district. According to a World Bank report, as of 2012, 31-38% of the population in Purulia, Murshidabad and Uttar Dinajpur districts were below poverty level, the highest among the districts of West Bengal, which had an average 20% of the population below poverty line.

== Economy ==
=== Livelihood ===
Livelihood
in Kashipur CD block
1. Cultivators (18.3%)
2. Agricultural labourers (43.7%)
3. Household industries (2.97%)
4. Other Workers (35.0%)

In the Kashipur CD block in 2011, among the class of total workers, cultivators numbered 15,208 and formed 18.32%, agricultural labourers numbered 36,249 and formed 43.68%, household industry workers numbered 2,463 and formed 2.97% and other workers numbered 29,075 and formed 35.03%. Total workers numbered 82,995 and formed 41.48% of the total population, and non-workers numbered 117,088 and formed 58.52% of the population.

Note: In the census records a person is considered a cultivator, if the person is engaged in cultivation/ supervision of land owned by self/government/institution. When a person who works on another person's land for wages in cash or kind or share, is regarded as an agricultural labourer. Household industry is defined as an industry conducted by one or more members of the family within the household or village, and one that does not qualify for registration as a factory under the Factories Act. Other workers are persons engaged in some economic activity other than cultivators, agricultural labourers and household workers. It includes factory, mining, plantation, transport and office workers, those engaged in business and commerce, teachers, entertainment artistes and so on.

=== Infrastructure ===
There are 198 inhabited villages in the Kashipur CD block, as per the District Census Handbook, Puruliya, 2011, 100% villages have power supply. 197 villages (99.49%) have drinking water supply. 38 villages (18.18%) have post offices. 179 villages (90.40%) have telephones (including landlines, public call offices and mobile phones). 85 villages (45.93%) have pucca (paved) approach roads and 66 villages (33.33%) have transport communication (includes bus service, rail facility and navigable waterways). 3 villages (1.52%) have agricultural credit societies and 4 villages (2.02%) have banks.

=== Agriculture ===
In 2013–14, persons engaged in agriculture in the Kashipur CD block could be classified as follows: bargadars 0.96%, patta (document) holders 15.97%, small farmers (possessing land between 1 and 2 hectares) 4.74%, marginal farmers (possessing land up to 1 hectare) 25.96% and agricultural labourers 52.37%.

In 2013–14, the total area irrigated in the Kashipur CD block was 9,001.30 hectares, out of which 2,367.40 hectares by canal water, 4,435.92 hectares by tank water, 44.68 hectares by river lift irrigation, 228.60 hectares by open dug wells and 1,924.70 hectares by other means.

In 2013–14, the Kashipur CD block produced 48,385 tonnes of Aman paddy, the main winter crop, from 22,061 hectares, 25 tonnes of Boro paddy from 12 hectares, 25 tonnes of wheat from 17 hectares. It also produced maize, mustard, til and potatoes.

=== Banking ===
In 2013–14, the Kashipur CD block had offices of 7 commercial banks and 3 gramin banks.

=== Backward Regions Grant Fund ===
The Purulia district is listed as a backward region and receives financial support from the Backward Regions Grant Fund. The fund, created by the Government of India, is designed to redress regional imbalances in development. As of 2012, 272 districts across the country were listed under this scheme. The list includes 11 districts of West Bengal.

== Transport ==
In 2013–14, the Kashipur CD block had 5 originating/ terminating bus routes.

The Asansol-Adra line of the South Eastern Railway terminates in this CD block at a major junction station at the Adra with connections to Kharagpur, Purulia and Gomoh.

The Kharagpur-Bankura-Adra line of the South Eastern Railway terminates at Adra.

== Education ==
In 2013–14, the Kashipur CD block had 231 primary schools with 19,104 students, 40 middle schools with 2,203 students, 8 high schools with 4,991 students and 17 higher secondary schools with 17,986 students. Kashipur CD block had 1 general college with 1,521 students and 587 institutions with 9,197 students for special and non-formal education.

See also – Education in India

According to the 2011 census, in Kashipur CD block, amongst the 198 inhabited villages, 9 villages did not have a school, 46 villages had two or more primary schools, 35 villages had at least 1 primary and 1 middle school and 20 villages had at least 1 middle and 1 secondary school.

Kashipur Michael Madhusudhan Mahavidyalaya was established in 2000 at Kashipur.

== Healthcare ==
In 2014, the Kashipur CD block had 1 block primary health centre, 4 primary health centres and 1 central government medical facility, with total 256 beds and 13 doctors. 9,970 patients were treated indoor and 296,525 patients were treated outdoor in the hospitals, health centres and subcentres of the CD Block.

Kolloli Rural Hospital, with 30 beds at Panchakot Raj, is the major government medical facility in the Kashipur CD block. There are primary health centres at Talajuri (PO Gorangdih) (with 10 beds), Kroshjuri (with 10 beds), Agardih (with 2 beds) and Kantaranguri (PO Beko) (with 6 beds). South Eastern Railway Hospital at Adra functions with 222 beds.
