= Muraddi =

Muradi
- Village
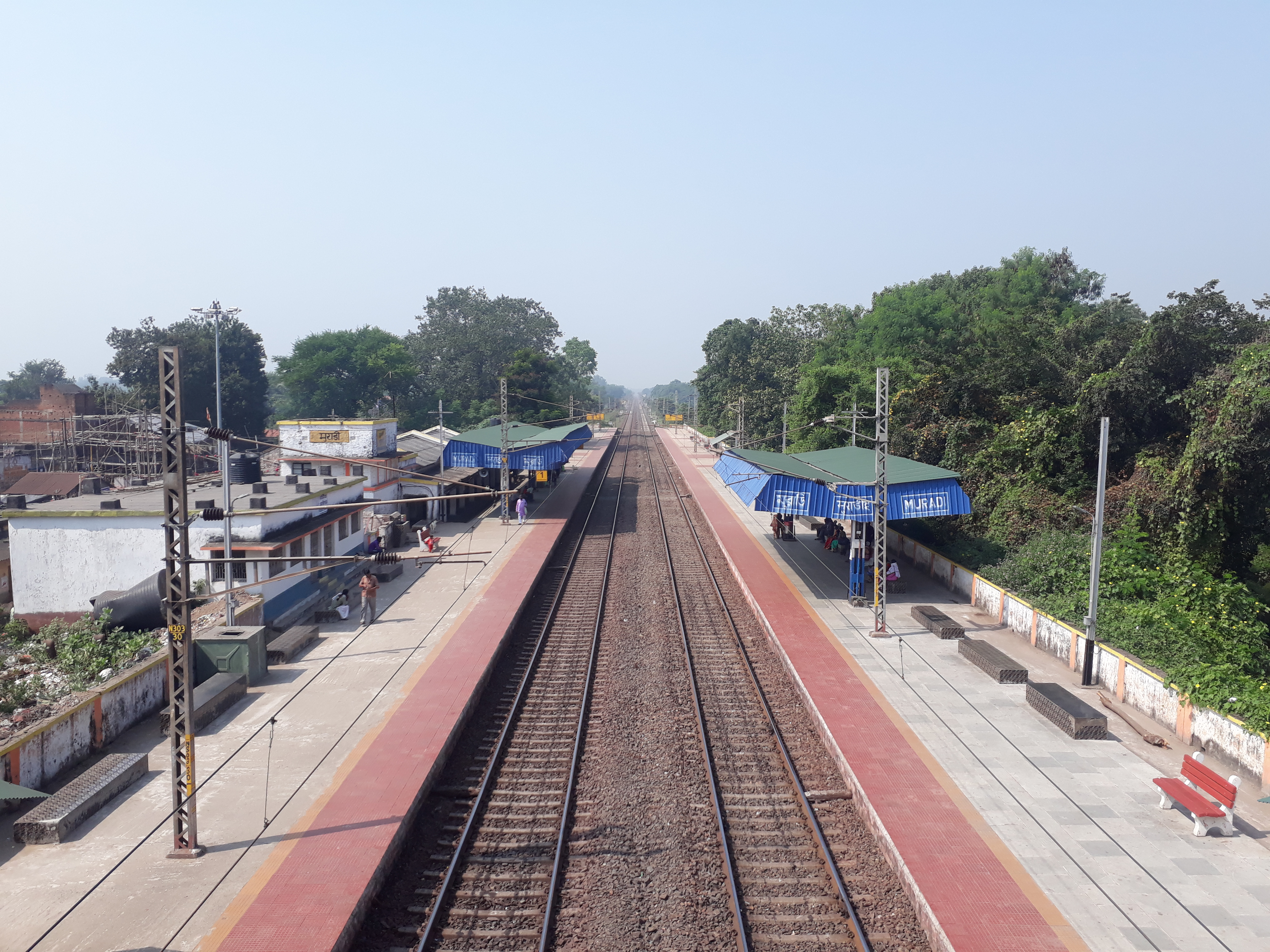
- Muradi railway station

- Location in West Bengal, India Muradi (India)
- Coordinates: 23°35′10.0″N 86°49′27.5″E
- Country: India
- State: West Bengal
- District: Purulia

Population (2011)
  - Total: 2,321

Languages
  - Official: Bengali, English
- Time zone: UTC+5:30 (IST)
- PIN: 723156 (Murardih)
- Telephone/STD code: 03251
- Lok Sabha constituency: Bankura
- Vidhan Sabha constituency: Raghunathpur
- Website: purulia.gov.in

Muradi (Muraddi) is a village in the Santuri CD block in the Raghunathpur subdivision of the Purulia district in the Indian state of West Bengal.

== Geography ==
Places in Raghunathpur subdivision in Purulia district
M: municipal town, CT: census town, R: rural/ urban centre, H: historical/ religious centre, T: tourist centre
Owing to space constraints in the small map, the actual locations in a larger map may vary slightly

=== Area overview ===
Purulia district forms the lowest step of the Chota Nagpur Plateau. The general scenario is undulating land with scattered hills. Raghunathpur subdivision occupies the northern part of the district. 83.80% of the population of the subdivision lives in rural areas. However, there are pockets of urbanization and 16.20% of the population lives in urban areas. There are 14 census towns in the subdivision. It is presented in the map given alongside. There is a coal mining area around Parbelia and two thermal power plants are there – the 500 MW Santaldih Thermal Power Station and the 1200 MW Raghunathpur Thermal Power Station. The subdivision has a rich heritage of old temples, some of them belonging to the 11th century or earlier. The Banda Deul is a monument of national importance. The comparatively more recent in historical terms, Panchkot Raj has interesting and intriguing remains in the area.

Note: The map alongside presents some of the notable locations in the subdivision. All places marked in the map are linked in the larger full screen map.

== Demographics ==
Sri Shyama Temple at Muradi

According to the 2011 Census of India, Muraddi had a total population of 2,321 of which 1,154 (50%) were males and 1,167 (50%) were females. There were 235 persons in the age range of 0–6 years. The total number of literate persons in Muraddi was 1,527 (73.20% of the population over 6 years).

== Civic administration ==
=== CD block HQ ===
The headquarters of Santuri CD block are located at Muraddi.

== Transport ==
Muradi is a station on the Asansol-Adra line of South Eastern Railway.

== Ramchandrapur Medium Irrigation Project ==
Ramchandrapur Dam across the Machkhandajore River, near Muraddi, was completed in 1991 as part of Ramchanndrapur Medium Irrigation Project. Muradi dam is an earthen dam 899 m long, with a concrete spillway. The maximum height above the foundation is 15 m. Baranti, a small village 6 km from Muradi railway station and near the dam, has become a popular tourist attraction.

== Education ==
Muradi S.R.B.P. High School is a Bengali-medium coeducational institution established in 1947. It has facilities for teaching from class V to class XII. It has 10 computers and 2,000 books in the library.

Muradi Girls High School is a Bengali-medium girls only institution established in 1960. It has facilities for teaching from class V to class XII. It has 10 computers.

== Healthcare ==
Muraddi Rural Hospital, with 30 beds at Muraddi, is the major government medical facility in the Santuri CD block.

Ramchandrapur Netaji Eye and General Hospital, at Ramchandrapur, functioning under the Health and Family Welfare department of the Government of West Bengal, established in 1953, is a 242 bedded eye care institution. 10,790 patients are treated in-door annually and 130,000 patients attend the Out Patient’s Department.
