= Kamalakanta Hansda =

Indian politician

Member of the West Bengal Legislative Assembly
- In office 2 May 2021 – Incumbent
- Preceded by: Swapan Kumar Beltharia
- Constituency: Kashipur

Personal details
- Party: Bharatiya Janata Party

Kamalakanta Hansda is an Indian politician from Bharatiya Janata Party. In May 2021, he was elected as a member of the West Bengal Legislative Assembly from Kashipur (constituency). He defeated Swapan Kumar Beltharia of All India Trinamool Congress by 7,240 votes in 2021 West Bengal Assembly election.
