= Annapurna pally =

Annapurna Pally is a township in ward no. 12 of Raghunathpur municipality, mouza Nanduara, Purulia district in the Indian state of West Bengal. This township is named after Goddess Annapurna, whose temple situated at the middle of the Township. It is situated at 1 kilometre from Joychandi Pahar railway station and adjacent to the mountain called Joychandi Pahar.
