= Damodar Sekhar =

Ruler of Panchkot Raj

Panchkot Raj
- 80 AD
- Capital: Garh Panchkot
- Raja (King or Chief)
  - 1st: Maharaja Damodar Shekhar
- History
  - Established: 80 AD
- Today part of: Jharkhand, West Bengal, India

Damodar Shekhar was the first king of the Panchkot Raj family, belonging to the Kudmi Mahato community.

== History ==
=== Panchkot Raj ===
The Panchkot Jagir (also known as Zamindari Raj of Panchkot or Chakla Panchkot) was founded about the year 80 AD by Damodar Shekhar. The Panchkot Raj had ruled from their capital at Garh Panchkot from 940 AD to 1750 AD. However, Bargi attacks laid waste to the place. Around 1750 AD, Panchkot Raj family shifted to Kashipur and have been there since then. Among the recent members were Raja Bahadur Jyoti Prasad Singh Deo, who ruled from 1901–1938 and was granted the title of Raja as a personal distinction in 1912. Raja Kalyani Prasad Singh Deo ruled from 1938–1945, Raja Shankari Prasad Singh Deo ruled from 1945 to 1956 and Raja Bhubaneswari Prasad Singh Deo ruled from 1956-1972.

=== Religion ===
The Panchkot Raj family, by the eighteenth century, had been Hinduized and provided with a genealogy linking the first Raja with the twelfth Maharaja of Ujjain.
