= Muradi railway station =

Railway station in West Bengal, India

MURADI

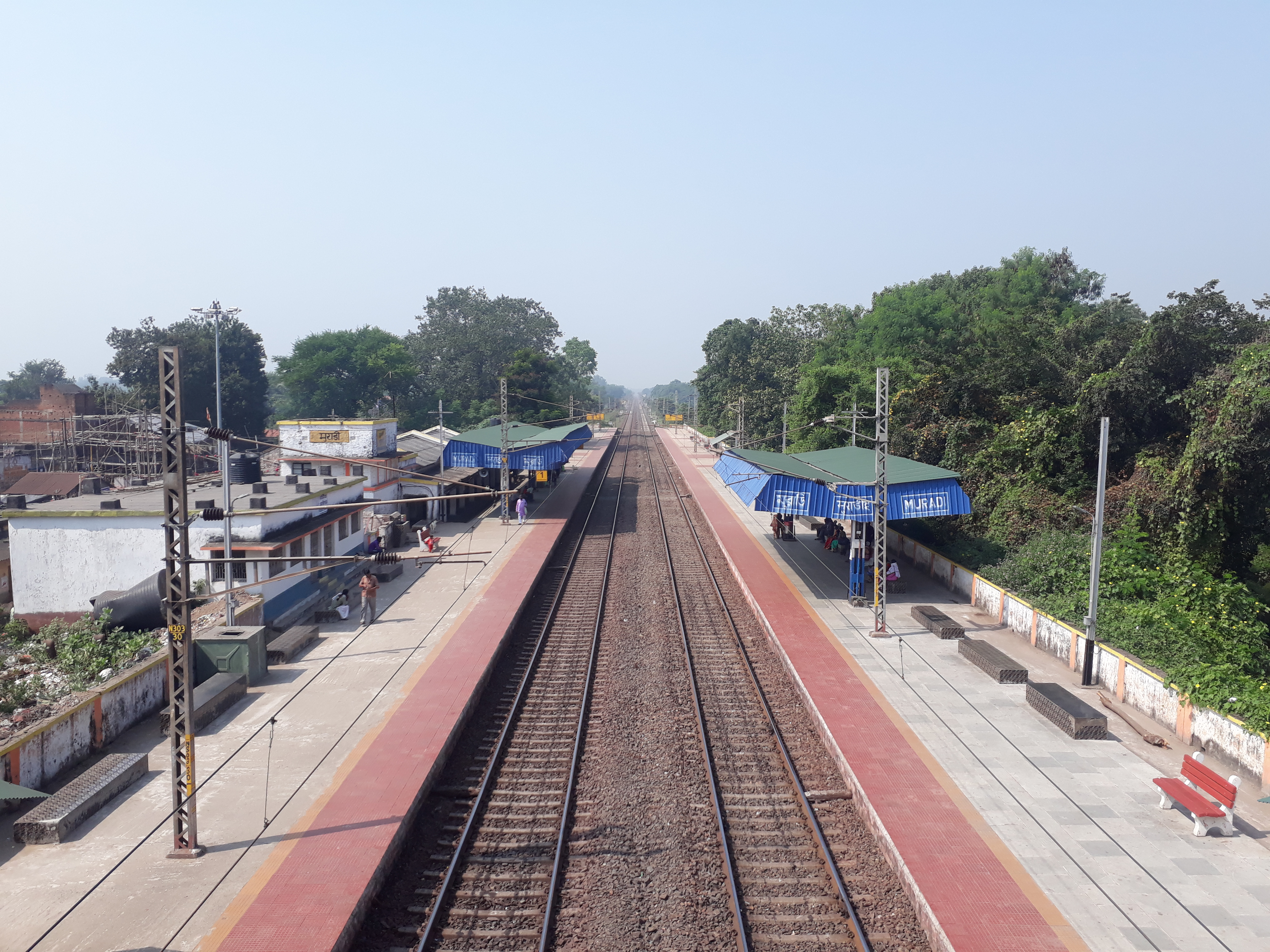
- Muradi station seen from foot overbridge

General information
- Location: Muradi, Purulia district, West Bengal; India
- Coordinates: 23°35′35″N 86°48′33″E
- Elevation: 139 metres (456 ft)
- System: Indian Railways station
- Owner: Indian Railways
- Operator: South Eastern Railway
- Line: Asansol–Adra line
- Platforms: 1

Construction
- Structure type: At Ground
- Parking: No
- Cycle facilities: No

Other information
- Station code: MDF
- Division(s): Adra

History
- Opened: 1891
- Electrified: 1957–62
- Former names: Bengal Nagpur Railway
Services
Preceding station	Indian Railways	Following station
Madhukunda towards ?	South Eastern Railway zone Asansol–Adra section	Ramkanali towards ?
Route map
Location
- Location within West Bengal Location within India

Muradi railway station serves Muraddi, Ramchandrapur and the surrounding areas in Purulia district in the Indian state of West Bengal.

== History ==
The Bengal Nagpur Railway main line from Nagpur to Asansol, on the Howrah–Delhi main line, was opened for goods traffic on 1 February 1891.

== Electrification ==
The Tatanagar–Adra–Asansol section was electrified in the 1957–1962 period. The Asansol–Purulia sector was electrified in 1961–62.

== Economy ==
Baranti, a small tribal village near Muradi railway station, is developing as a tourist centre and part of tourism industry in Purulia.

== Health ==
Netaji Eye Hospital established by Swami Asimananda Saraswati at Ramchandrapur serves the rural people.
