= Joychandi Pahar =

Hill in Purulia, West Bengal, India

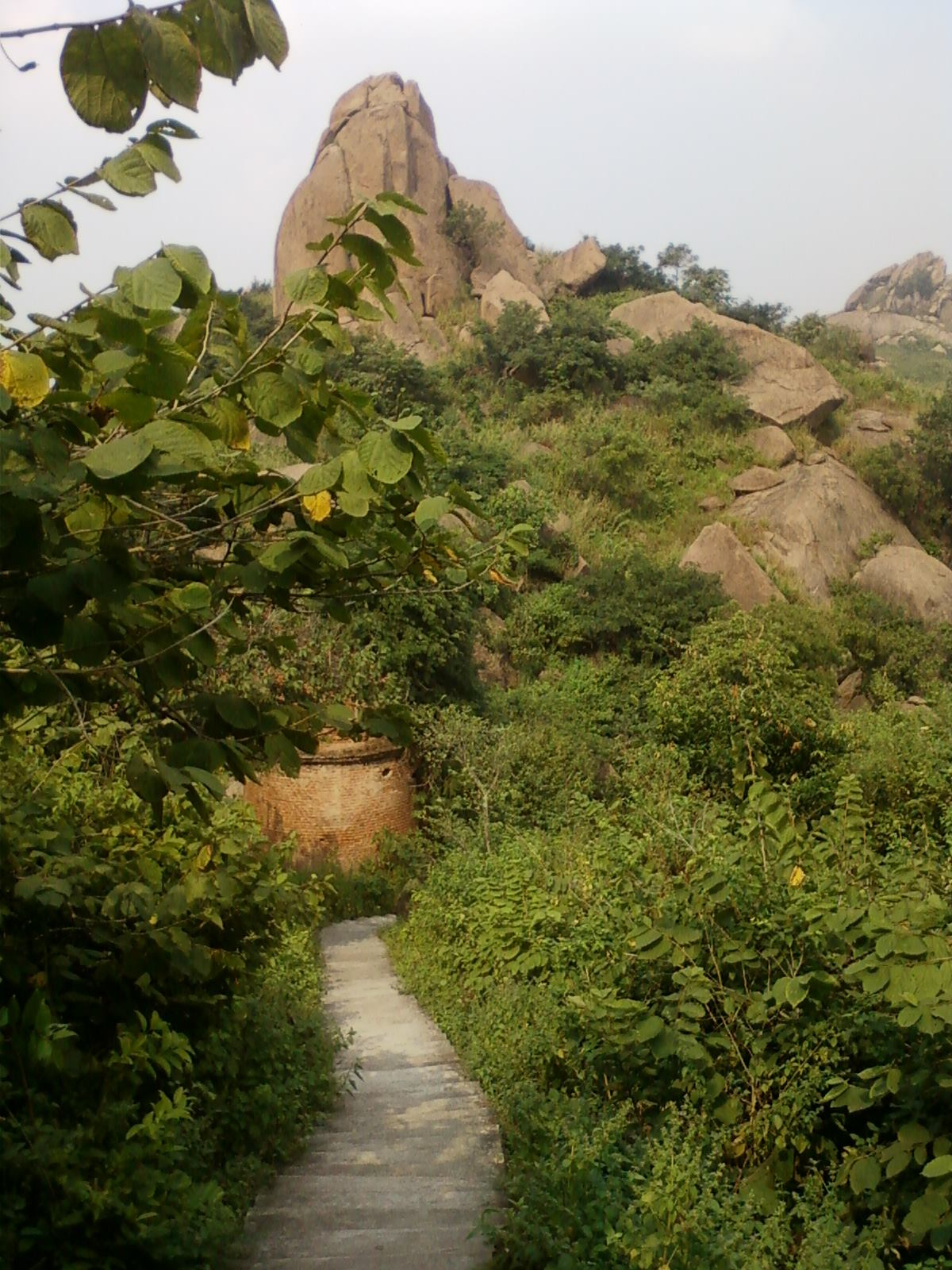
- Joychandi Pahar

Geography
- Approximate map of Joychandi Pahar and some locations in Raghunathpur subdivision in Purulia district. Mouse over or tap press for more information. A full screen map is available on click through. Key: M: Municipal town, C: census town, R: rural/ urban centre, H: historical/ religious centre, T: tourist centre, △：hill,: coal mine
- Location: Adra road, Raghunathpur, Purulia district, West Bengal, India
- Parent range: Chota Nagpur Plateau

Joychandi Pahar is a hill which is a popular tourist attraction in the Indian state of West Bengal in Purulia district. It is 2 kilometres (1.2 miles) from the subdivisional town of Raghunathpur and 4 kilometres (2.5 miles) from Adra town. The hill is situated 2 kilometres (1.2 miles) south from Purulia – Barakar road via Nanduara village and 1 kilometre (0.62 miles) west from Raghunathpur-Adra Road via a growing township known as Annapurna pally. It is also just 4 kilometres (2.5 miles) away from Adra Junction railway station and 1.5 kilometres (0.93 miles) from Joychandipahar railway station, which is situated on Adra-Asansol section. Joychandi hill is a popular tourist centre and major attraction for rock climbing. Joychandi Pahar railway station is on the Asansol – Adra section of South Eastern Railway, in the state capital of Kolkata. Another rock climbing centre to the south east is at Susunia Pahar. Joychandi Hill is characterized by its rich variety of plant species, including Acacia concinna, Helicteres isora, Alangium salviifolium, Holoptelea integrifolia, Azadirachta indica, Butea monosperma, and many others. Additionally, 74 species of butterflies have also been documented in the vicinity of Joychandi Hill.

== Geography ==
=== Location ===
Joychandi Pahar, Raghunathpur is located at 23.55°N 86.67°E. It has an average elevation of 155 m (509 ft).

=== Area overview ===
Purulia district forms the lowest step of the Chota Nagpur Plateau. The general scenario is undulating land with scattered hills.Raghunathpur subdivision occupies the north-western part of the district. 83.80% of the population of the subdivision lives in rural areas. However, there are pockets of urbanization and 16.20% of the population lives in urban areas. There are 14 census towns in the subdivision. It is presented in the map given alongside. There is a coal mining area around Parbelia and two thermal power plants are there – the 500 MW Santaldih Thermal Power Station and the 1200 MW Raghunathpur Thermal Power Station. The subdivision has a rich heritage of old temples, some of them belonging to the 11th century or earlier. The Banda Deul is a monument of national importance. The comparatively more recent in historical terms, Panchkot Raj has interesting and intriguing remains in the area.

== Festival ==
Every Year A Festival is held in the foothills after the Christmas and this Festival usually continues to 1 January or 2 January. This Festival often becomes tourist attraction and also motivates local artists. This Festival Gives all local artists to show their skills. The Festival Often referred as Joychandi Pahar Pariyatan Utsav।

== Fiction ==
The Bengali film directed by Satyajit Ray, Hirak Rajar Deshe was mostly shot in this mountain area.

== Gallery ==
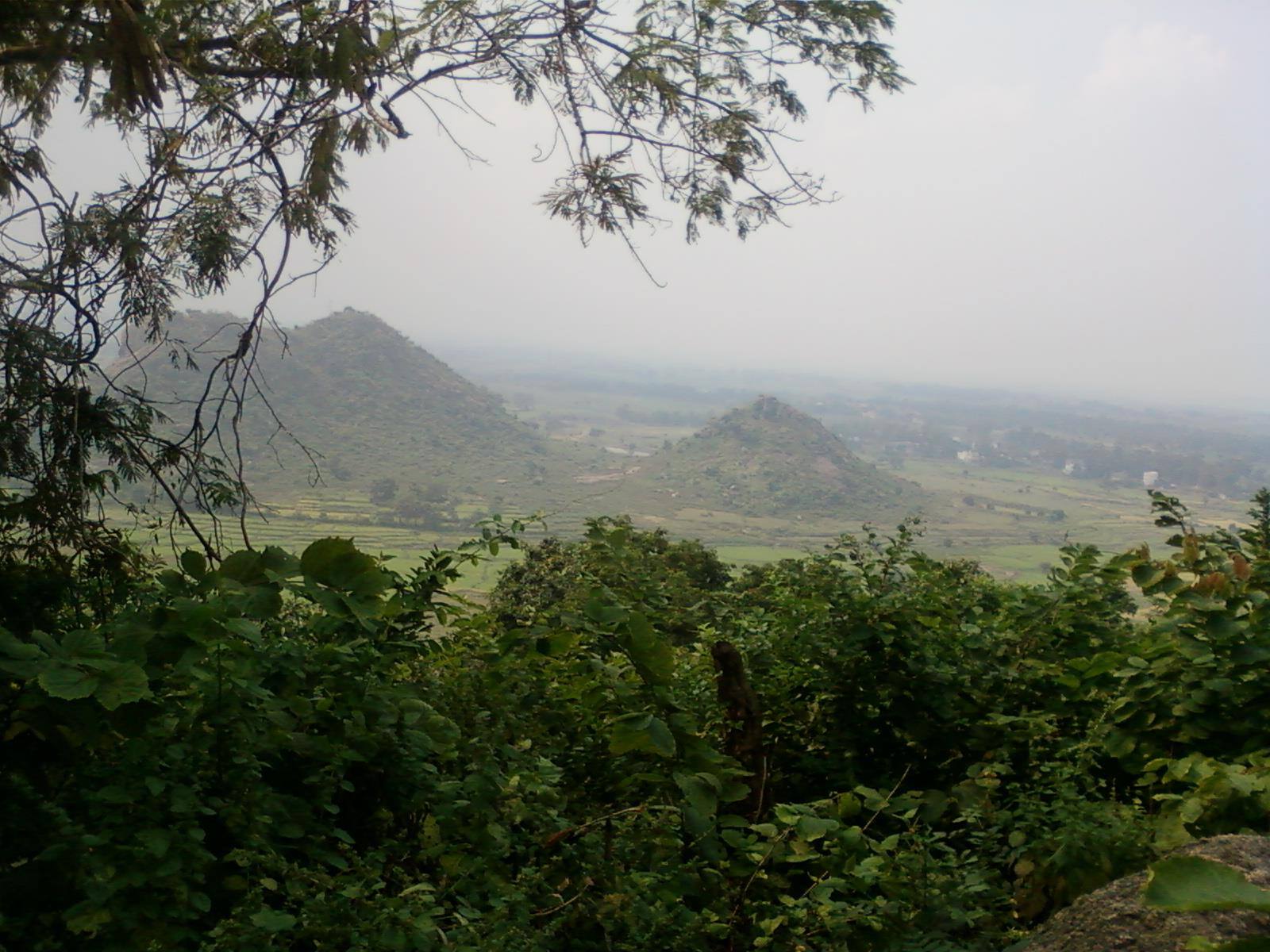
Joychandi pahar

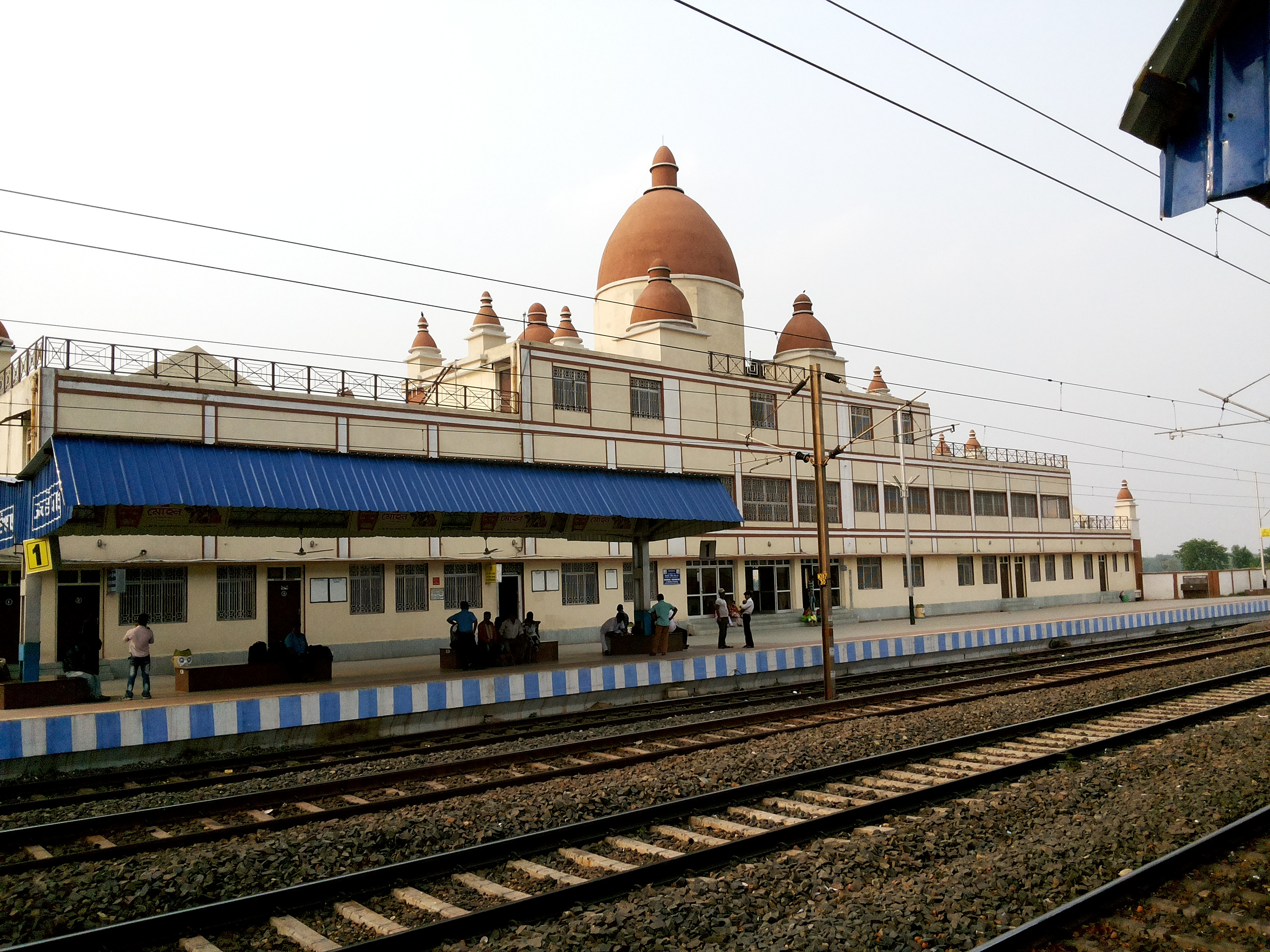
Inside view of the Joychandi Pahar Railway's station

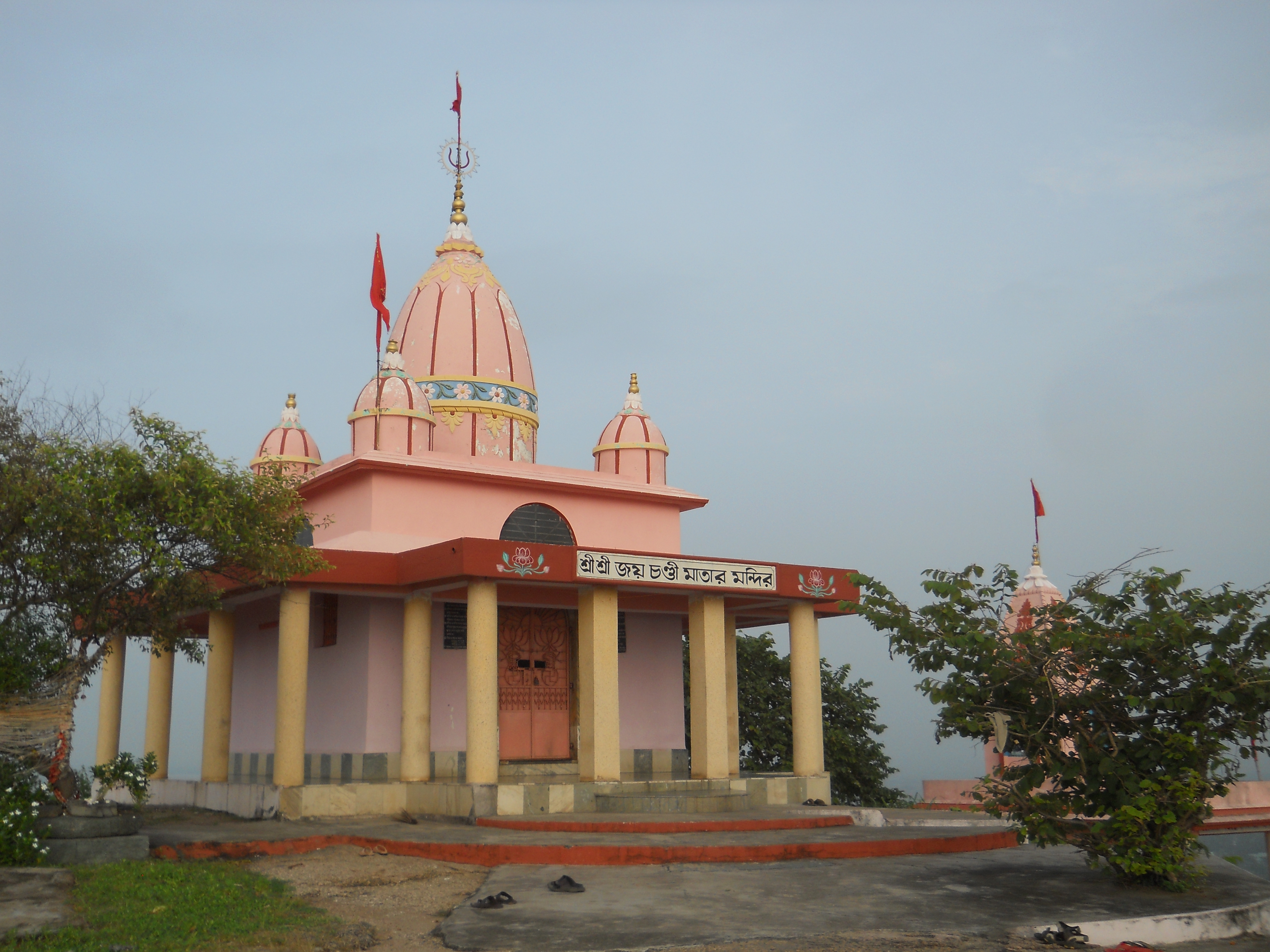
Temple at the hilltop of Jaychandi pahar, Purulia

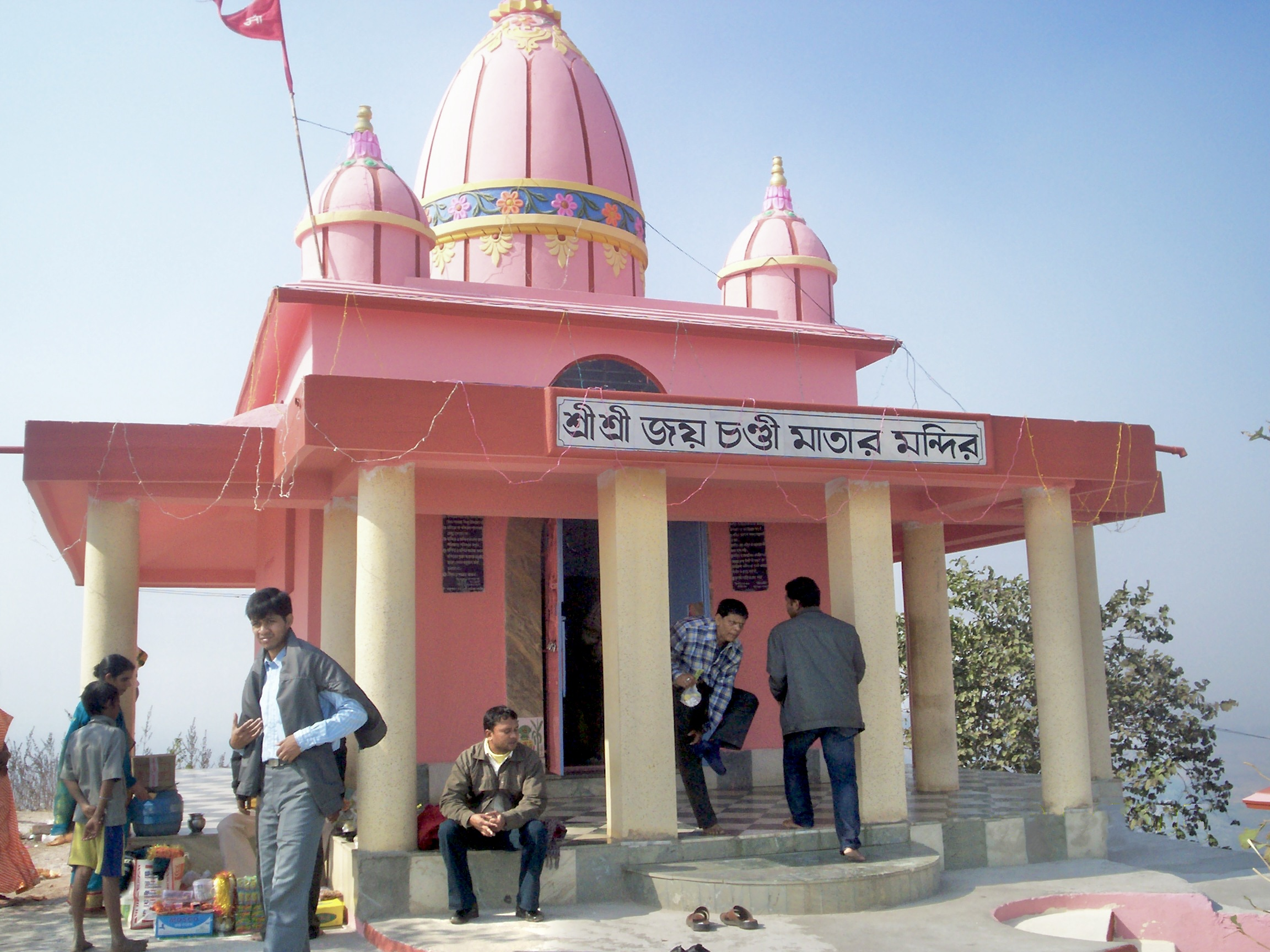
Goddess Joychandi Temple.( Locally known as "Joychandi Matar Mandir" )

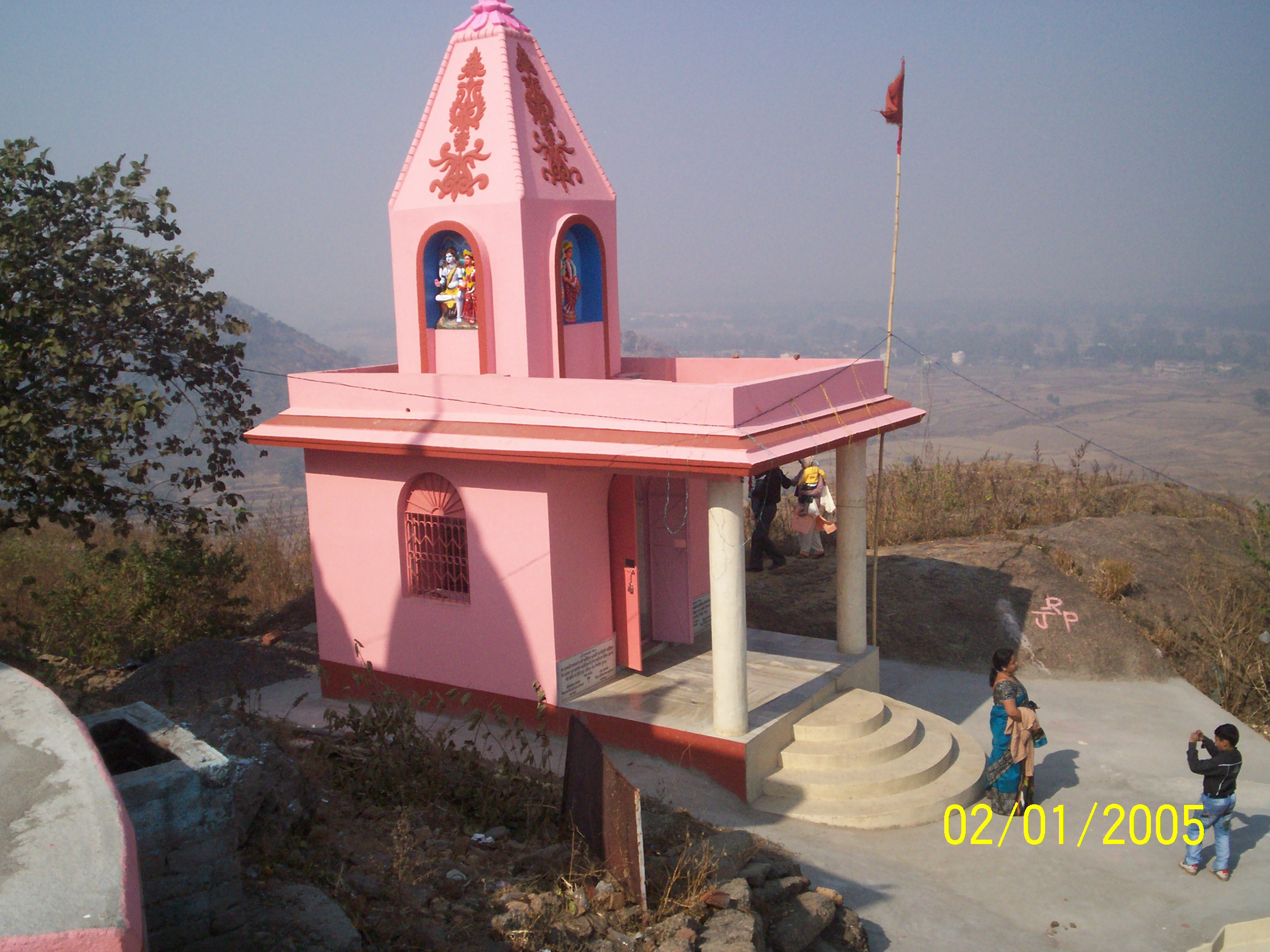
Hanuman Temple in the Joychandi Mountain

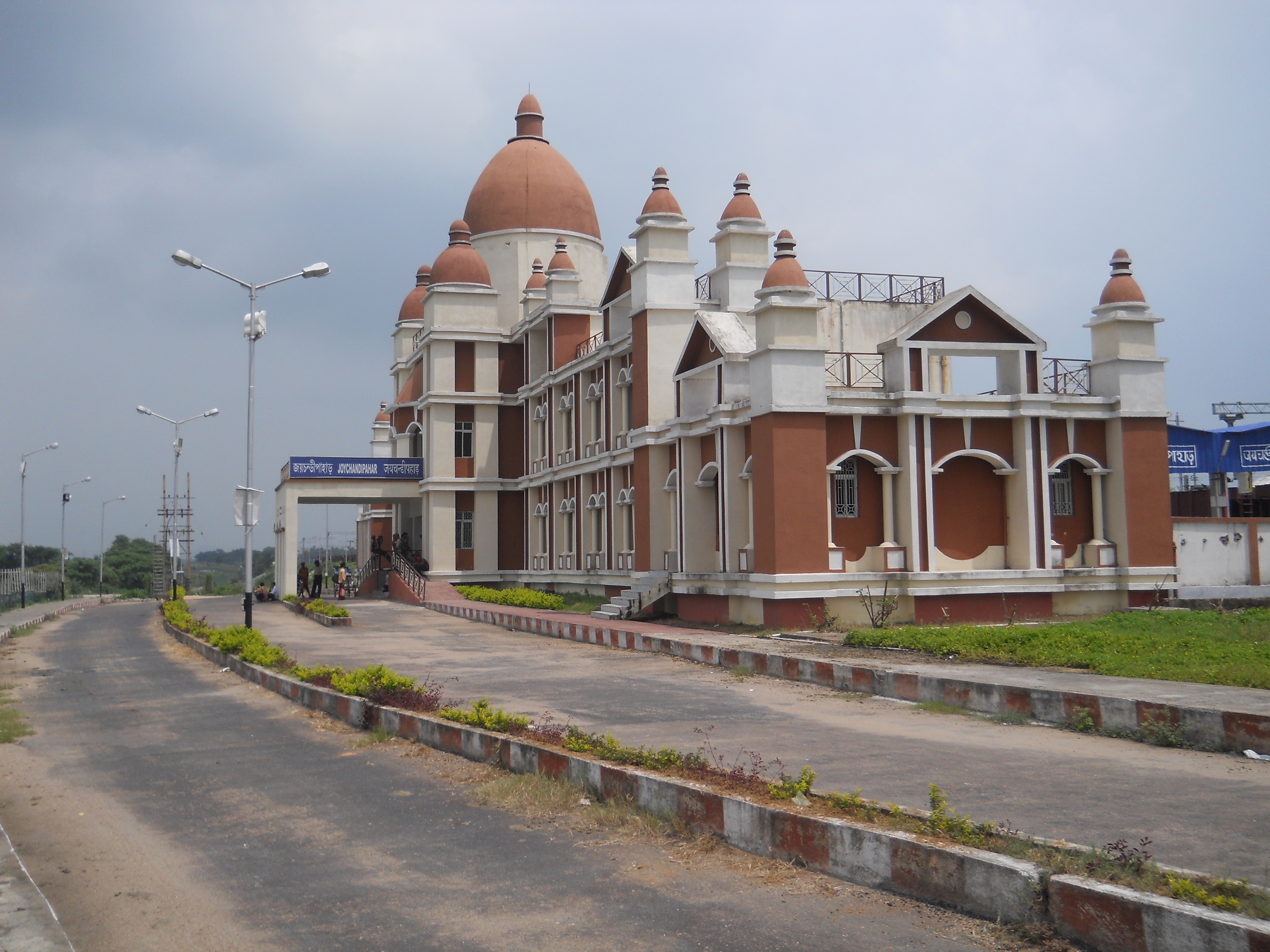
Joychandi Hill Railway Station
