= Madhukunda =

- Village
- Location in West Bengal, India Madhukunda (India)
- Coordinates: 23.6269°N 86.8695°E
- Country: India
- State: West Bengal
- District: Purulia

Population (2011)
  - Total: 984

Languages
  - Official: Bengali, English
- Time zone: UTC+5:30 (IST)
- PIN: 723 121
- ISO 3166 code: IN-WB
- Vehicle registration: WB
- Website: purulia.gov.in/egov/egov_initiative.html

Madhukunda is a census village under Bailtora village panchayat of Santuri intermediate panchayat in Purulia district in the Indian state of West Bengal. It is located on the south bank of Damodar River. It is served by the post office at Sunuri.

== Geography ==
Places in Raghunathpur subdivision in Purulia district
M: municipal town, CT: census town, R: rural/ urban centre, H: historical/ religious centre, T: tourist centre
Owing to space constraints in the small map, the actual locations in a larger map may vary slightly

=== Area overview ===
Purulia district forms the lowest step of the Chota Nagpur Plateau. The general scenario is undulating land with scattered hills. Raghunathpur subdivision occupies the northern part of the district. 83.80% of the population of the subdivision lives in rural areas. However, there are pockets of urbanization and 16.20% of the population lives in urban areas. There are 14 census towns in the subdivision. It is presented in the map given alongside. There is a coal mining area around Parbelia and two thermal power plants are there – the 500 MW Santaldih Thermal Power Station and the 1200 MW Raghunathpur Thermal Power Station. The subdivision has a rich heritage of old temples, some of them belonging to the 11th century or earlier. The Banda Deul is a monument of national importance. The comparatively more recent in historical terms, Panchkot Raj has interesting and intriguing remains in the area.

Note: The map alongside presents some of the notable locations in the subdivision. All places marked in the map are linked in the larger full screen map.

== Demographics ==
As per 2011 Census of India Madhukunda had a total population of 984 of which 500 (51%) were males and 484 (49%) were females. Population below 6 years was 145. The total number of literates in Madhukunda was 567 (67.58% of the population over 6 years).

== Bridge ==
The small village has come into prominence with the laying of foundation stone for a road bridge across the Damodar River, connecting Madhukunda with Burnpur-Asansol, adjacent to the existing railway bridge. The foundation stone was laid by Ram Vilas Paswan, Union Minister of Steel, on 18 March 2008. The construction of the bridge, estimated to cost about Rs. 50 crore, is being funded by the Steel Authority of India Limited under its corporate social responsibility programme. The proposed all-weather road bridge will be 720-metre long.

The bridge will connect not only portions of Purulia district with the Asansol-Burnpur mining-industrial zone but also Saltora and other areas of Bankura district, which are adjacent to the Madhukunda area and are already connected by road.

== Economy ==
Madhukunda is the first railway station in Purulia district on the Asansol-Adra section of South Eastern Railway.

There is a cement plant, Damodhar Cement Works, owned by ACC Ltd. at Madhukunda.
