= Kalloli =

- Village
- Location in West Bengal, India Kalloli (India)
- Coordinates: 23°26′10.0″N 86°40′59.2″E
- Country: India
- State: West Bengal
- District: Purulia

Population (2011)
  - Total: 1,524

Languages
  - Official: Bengali, English
- Time zone: UTC+5:30 (IST)
- PIN: 723132 (Panchakote Raj)
- Telephone/STD code: 03251
- Lok Sabha constituency: Purulia
- Vidhan Sabha constituency: Kashipur
- Website: purulia.gov.in

Kalloli is a village in the Kashipur CD block in the Raghunathpur subdivision of the Purulia district in the state of West Bengal, India. It is close to Kashipur.

== Geography ==
Places in Raghunathpur subdivision in Purulia district
M: municipal town, CT: census town, R: rural/ urban centre, H: historical/ religious centre, T: tourist centre
Owing to space constraints in the small map, the actual locations in a larger map may vary slightly

=== Area overview ===
Purulia district forms the lowest step of the Chota Nagpur Plateau. The general scenario is undulating land with scattered hills. Raghunathpur subdivision occupies the northern part of the district. 83.80% of the population of the subdivision lives in rural areas. However, there are pockets of urbanization and 16.20% of the population lives in urban areas. There are 14 census towns in the subdivision. It is presented in the map given alongside. There is a coal mining area around Parbelia and two thermal power plants are there – the 500 MW Santaldih Thermal Power Station and the 1200 MW Raghunathpur Thermal Power Station. The subdivision has a rich heritage of old temples, some of them belonging to the 11th century or earlier. The Banda Deul is a monument of national importance. The comparatively more recent in historical terms, Panchkot Raj has interesting and intriguing remains in the area.

Note: The map alongside presents some of the notable locations in the subdivision. All places marked in the map are linked in the larger full screen map.

== Demographics ==
As per 2011 Census of India Kalloli had a total population of 1,524 of which 783 (51%) were males and 741 (49%) were females. Population below 6 years was 164. The total number of literates in Kalloli was 1,076 (79.12% of the population over 6 years).

== Civic administration ==
=== CD block HQ ===
The headquarters of the Kashipur CD block are located at Kalloli.

== Transport ==
Kashipur-Chhatna Road passes through Kalloli.

== Healthcare ==
Kalloli Block Primary Health Centre functions with 30 beds.
