= Ramchandrapur, Purulia =

Ramchandrapur
- Village
- Location in West Bengal, India Ramchandrapur (India)
- Coordinates: 23°34′57.8″N 86°48′24.1″E
- Country: India
- State: West Bengal
- District: Purulia

Population (2011)
  - Total: 2,648

Languages
  - Official: Bengali, English
- Time zone: UTC+5:30 (IST)
- Telephone/STD code: 03251
- Lok Sabha constituency: Bankura
- Vidhan Sabha constituency: Raghunathpur
- Website: purulia.gov.in

Ramchandrapur is a village in Santuri CD Block in Raghunathpur subdivision of Purulia district in the state of West Bengal, India.

== Geography ==
Places in Raghunathpur subdivision in Purulia district
M: Municipal town, CT: census town, R: rural/ urban centre, H: historical/ religious centre, T: tourist centre
Owing to space constraints in the small map, the actual locations in a larger map may vary slightly

=== Area overview ===
Purulia district forms the lowest step of the Chota Nagpur Plateau. The general scenario is undulating land with scattered hills. Raghunathpur subdivision occupies the northern part of the district. 83.80% of the population of the subdivision lives in rural areas. However, there are pockets of urbanization and 16.20% of the population lives in urban areas. There are 14 census towns in the subdivision. It is presented in the map given alongside. There is a coal mining area around Parbelia and two thermal power plants are there – the 500 MW Santaldih Thermal Power Station and the 1200 MW Raghunathpur Thermal Power Station. The subdivision has a rich heritage of old temples, some of them belonging to the 11th century or earlier. The Banda Deul is a monument of national importance. The comparatively more recent in historical terms, Panchkot Raj has interesting and intriguing remains in the area.

Note: The map alongside presents some of the notable locations in the subdivision. All places marked in the map are linked in the larger full screen map.

== Demographics ==
As per 2011 Census of India Ramchandrapur had a total population of 2,648 of which 1,374 (52%) were males and 1,274 (48%) were females. Population below 6 years was 267. The total number of literates in Ramchandrapur was 1,774 (74.51% of the population over 6 years).

== Transport ==
Muradi is the nearest station on the Asansol-Adra line of South Eastern Railway.

== Ramchandrapur Medium Irrigation Project ==
Muradih Dam across the Machkhandajore River, near Muraddi, was completed in 1991 as part of Ramchandrapur Medium Irrigation Project. The dam is an earthen dam 899 m long, with a concrete spillway. The maximum height above the foundation is 15 m. Baranti, a small village 6 km from Muradi railway station and near the dam, has become a popular tourist attraction.

== Healthcare ==
Ramchandrapur Netaji Eye and General Hospital, functioning under the Health and Family Welfare department of the Government of West Bengal, established in 1953, is a 242 bedded eye care institution. 10,790 patients are treated in-door annually and 130,000 patients attend the Out Patient’s Department.
