= Kashipur, West Bengal =

Kashipur
- Village
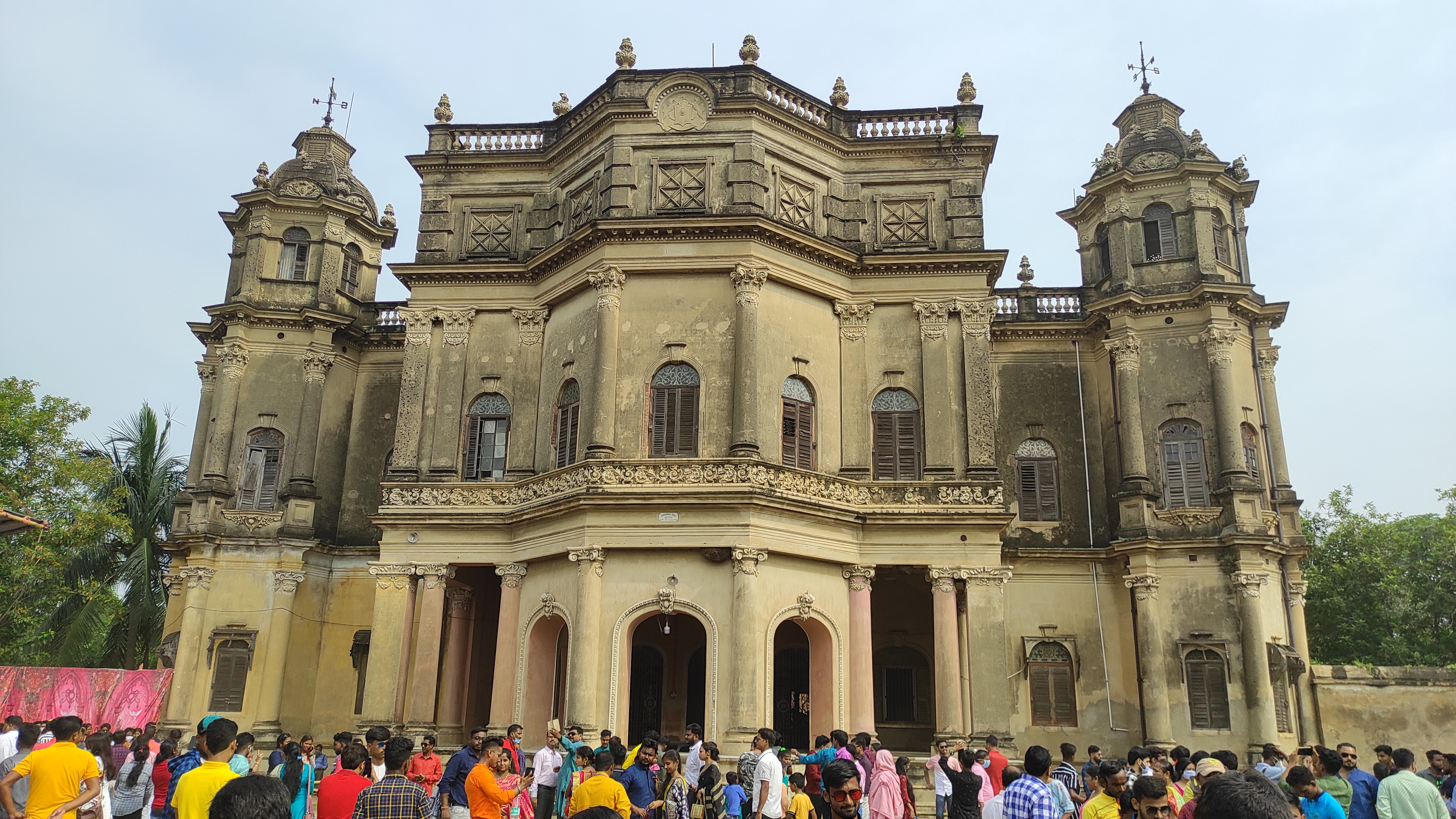
- Kashipur Rajbari

- Location in West Bengal, India Kashipur (India)
- Coordinates: 23°26′11″N 86°40′13″E
- Country: India
- State: West Bengal
- District: Purulia
- Subdivision: Raghunathpur

Government
  - Body: Gram panchayat

Languages
  - Official: Bengali, English
- Time zone: UTC+5:30 (IST)
- Website: wb.gov.in

Kashipur is a village, with a police station, in the Kashipur CD block in the Raghunathpur subdivision of the Purulia district in West Bengal, India. Kalloli, where the CD Block headquarters are located, is close to Kashipur.

== History ==
The Panchkot Raj had ruled from their capital at Garh Panchkot from 940 to 1750 AD. However, Panchkot Raj faced adversities towards the end of their stay at Garh Panchkot. Around 1600 AD . Subsequently, Bargi attacks laid waste the place. Around 1750 AD, the Panchkot Raj family shifted to Kashipur and have been here since then.

The Panchkot Jagir (also known as Zamindari Raj of Panchkot or Chakla Panchkot) was founded about the year 80 AD by Damodar Shekhar, who belonged to the Kudmi Mahato community.

Amongst the recent members were Raja Bahadur Jyoti Prasad Singh Deo, who ruled from 1901-1938 and was granted the title of Raja as a personal distinction in 1912. Raja Kalyani Prasad Singh Deo ruled from 1938-1945, Raja Shankari Prasad Singh Deo ruled from 1945 to 1956 and Raja Bhubaneswari Prasad Singh Deo ruled from 1956-1972.

== Geography ==
Places in Raghunathpur subdivision in Purulia district
M: municipal town, CT: census town, R: rural/ urban centre, H: historical/ religious centre, T: tourist centre
Owing to space constraints in the small map, the actual locations in a larger map may vary slightly

=== Location ===
Kashipur is located at 23°26′11″N 86°40′13″E.Kalloli, the place where the CD block headquarters are located, is close to Kashipur.

=== Area overview ===
Purulia district forms the lowest step of the Chota Nagpur Plateau. The general scenario is undulating land with scattered hills. Raghunathpur subdivision occupies the northern part of the district. 83.80% of the population of the subdivision lives in rural areas. However, there are pockets of urbanization and 16.20% of the population lives in urban areas. There are 14 census towns in the subdivision. It is presented in the map given alongside. There is a coal mining area around Parbelia and two thermal power plants are there – the 500 MW Santaldih Thermal Power Station and the 1200 MW Raghunathpur Thermal Power Station. The subdivision has a rich heritage of old temples, some of them belonging to the 11th century or earlier. The Banda Deul is a monument of national importance. The comparatively more recent, in historical terms, Panchkot Raj has interesting and intriguing remains in the area.

Note: The map alongside presents some of the notable locations in the subdivision. All places marked in the map are linked in the larger full screen map.

== Demographics ==
According to the 2011 Census of India Kashipur had a total population of 2,369 of which 1,246 (53%) were males and 1,123 (47%) were females. There were 258 persons in the age range of 0–6 years. The total number of literate persons in Kashipur was 1,632 (77.31% of the population over 6 years).

== Civic administration ==
=== Police station ===
Kashipur police station, along with Adra police station, has jurisdiction over the Kashipur CD block. The area covered is 801.88 km^{2} and the population covered is 199,932.

== Education ==
Kashipur Michael Madhusudhan Mahavidyalaya, established in 2000, is affiliated to Sidho Kanho Birsha University. It offers courses in arts and science. Santali and music are amongst the subjects taught. In 1872, Michael Madhusudan Dutt had worked with Kashipur Raj for a short period.

Kashipur Raj High School is a higher secondary school established in 1916.

J.K.M.Girls’ High School is a Bengali-medium girls only institution established in 1964. It has facilities for teaching from class V to class XII.

Kashipur Vivekananda Vidyapith is a Bengali-medium coeducational middle school established in 2003.

Panchkot Kashipur Raj Bhagini Nivedita Vidyapith is a Bengali-medium coeducational institution established in 2000. It has facilities for teaching from class I to class VIII.

== Healthcare ==
Kolloli Rural Hospital, with 60 beds at Panchakot Raj, is the major government medical facility in the Kashipur CD block.
