= Kashipur, West Bengal Assembly constituency =

Kashipur
- Constituency No. 244 for the West Bengal Legislative Assembly
- Interactive Map Outlining Kashipur Assembly Constituency

Constituency details
- Country: India
- Region: East India
- State: West Bengal
- District: Purulia
- Lok Sabha constituency: Purulia
- Established: 1957
- Total electors: 188,082
- Reservation: None

Member of Legislative Assembly
- 18th West Bengal Legislative Assembly
- Incumbent Kamalakanta Hansda
- Party: BJP
- Alliance: NDA
- Elected year: 2021

Kashipur Assembly constituency is an assembly constituency in Purulia district in the Indian state of West Bengal.

== Overview ==
As per orders of the Delimitation Commission, No. 244 Kashipur Assembly constituency is composed of the following: Kashipur community development block; Hura, Jabarrah, Kalabani, Keshargarh, Ladhurka, Lakhanpur and Rakhera Bishpuri gram panchayats of Hura community development block.

Kashipur Assembly constituency is part of No. 35 Purulia (Lok Sabha constituency). It was earlier part of Bankura (Lok Sabha constituency).

== Members of the Legislative Assembly ==
Year	Name	Party
From 1952 -1957 known as Kashipur cum Raghunathpur
1952	Budhan Manjhi	Indian National Congress
1952	Annada Prasad Chakrabarty	Independent politician
1957	Budhan Majhi	Indian National Congress
1957	Ledo Majhi	Lok Sewak Sangh
1962	Budhan Majhi	Indian National Congress
1967	S. N. Singh Deo	Indian National Congress
1969	Prabir Kumar Mallick	Communist Party of India
1971	Madan Mohan Mahato	Indian National Congress
1972	Madan Mohan Mahato	Indian National Congress
1977	Surendra Nath Majhi	Communist Party of India
1982	Surendra Nath Majhi	Communist Party of India
1987	Surendra Nath Majhi	Communist Party of India
1991	Surendra Nath Majhi	Communist Party of India
1996	Rabindranath Hembram	Communist Party of India
2001	Rabindranath Hembram	Communist Party of India
2006	Rabindranath Hembram	Communist Party of India
2011	Swapan Kumar Beltharia	All India Trinamool Congress
2016	Swapan Kumar Beltharia	All India Trinamool Congress
2021	Kamalakanta Hansda	Bharatiya Janata Party

== Election results ==
=== 2026 ===
2026 West Bengal Legislative Assembly election: Kashipur
Party	Candidate	Votes	%	±%
BJP	Kamlakanta Hansda	106,571	50.28	+2.59
AITC	Soumen Beltharia	85,295	40.24	−3.66
CPI(M)	Bauri Sulekha	10,818	5.1	−0.51
INC	Subhas Chandra Mahata	2,304	1.09	
NOTA	None of the above	2,797	1.32	+0.09
Majority		21,276	10.04	+6.25
Turnout		211,974	92.17	+10.58
BJP hold		Swing		

=== 2021 ===
West Bengal Legislative Assembly Election, 2021: Kashipur
Party	Candidate	Votes	%	±%
BJP	Kamalakanta Hansda	92,938	47.69	
AITC	Swapan Kumar Beltharia	85,551	43.9	
CPI(M)	Mallika Mahata	10,927	5.61	
SUCI(C)	Dipak Mahato	2,269	1.16	
NOTA	None of the above	2,401	1.23	
Majority		7,387	3.79	
Turnout		194,892	81.59	
BJP gain from AITC		Swing		

=== 2016 ===
2016 West Bengal Legislative Assembly election: Kashipur
Party	Candidate	Votes	%	±%
AITC	Swapan Kumar Beltharia	87,483	48.71	
CPI(M)	Sudin Kisku	67,905	37.81	
BJP	Kamalakanta Hansda	11,485	6.39	
JMM	Dipendu Mahato (Dipu)	3,069	1.71	
SUCI(C)	Dipak Mahato	2,948	1.64	
JDP	Baidyanath Hansda	2,249	1.45	
BSP	Rajesh Bauri	1,729	0.96	
NOTA	None of the above	2,727	1.52	
Majority				
Turnout		179,595	82.78	
AITC hold		Swing		

=== 2011 ===
West Bengal assembly elections, 2011: Kashipur
Party	Candidate	Votes	%	±%
AITC	Swapan Kumar Beltharia	69,492	44.73	+9.03#
CPI(M)	Subhas Chandra Mahata	65,771	42.33	−13.75
JMM	Satrughna Murmu	4,240	2.73	
BJP	Prasanta Singha Deo	3,933	2.53	
Independent	Dilip Mahato	3,671		
JDP	Manilal Hembram	2,653		
PDS	Sanjit Chakraborty	1,994		
BSP	Chitta Ranjan Mahato	1,965		
AJSU	Subhas Chandra Mahato	991		
JVM(P)	Ramprasad Majhi	666		
Turnout		155,376	82.61	
AITC gain from CPI(M)		Swing	22.78#	

.# Swing calculated on Congress+Trinamool Congress vote percentages taken together in 2006.

=== 2006 ===
In the 2006, 2001 and 1996 state assembly elections, Rabindranath Hembram of CPI(M) won the Kashipur seat defeating Anath Bandhu Patar of Trinamool Congress, Buddheswar Saren of Trinamool Congress, and Subhas Chandra Patar of Congress respectively. Contests in most years were multi cornered but only winners and runners are being mentioned. Surendranath Majhi of CPI(M) defeated Nandalal Saren of Congress in 1991, Anil Baran Murmu of Congress in 1987, Subhas Chandra Patar of Congress in 1982 and Rampada Majhi of Janata Party in 1977.

=== 1972 ===
Madan Mohan Mahato of Congress won in 1972 and 1971. Prabir Kumar Mallick of CPI won in 1969. N.S.Deo of Congress won in 1967. Budhan Majhi of Congress won in 1962. Ledu Majhi, Independent, and Budhan Majhi, Congress, won the Kashipur joint seat in 1957.
