= Birsa Munda Express =

Train in India

Overview
- Service type: Express
- Last service: 2020; 6 years ago
- Current operator: South Eastern Railway zone

Route
- Termini: Jhargram (JGM); Purulia Junction (PRR)
- Stops: 9
- Distance travelled: 185 km (115 mi)
- Average journey time: 3h 20m
- Service frequency: Weekly (Note: Runs one day in a week for every direction.)
- Train number: 22821/22822

On-board services
- Classes: AC 2 tier, AC 3 tier, Sleeper class, General Unreserved
- Seating arrangements: No
- Sleeping arrangements: Yes
- Catering facilities: On-board catering E-catering
- Observation facilities: ICF coach
- Entertainment facilities: No
- Baggage facilities: No
- Other facilities: Below the seats

Technical
- Rolling stock: 2
- Track gauge: 1,676 mm (5 ft 6 in)
- Operating speed: 55 km/h (34 mph), including halts

The Birsa Munda Express was an Express train belonging to South Eastern Railway zone that runs between Jhargram and Purulia Junction in India. It was operated with 22821/22822 train numbers on bi-weekly basis.

== Service ==
The 22821/Birsa Munda Express has an average speed of 55 km/h and covers 185 km in 3h 20m. The 22822/Birsa Munda Express has an average speed of 57 km/h and covers 185 km in 3h 15m.

== Route and halts ==
The important halts of the train are:

- Jhargram
- Gidhni
- Dhalbhumgarh
- Ghatsila
- Rakha Mines
- Tatanagar Junction
- Kandra Junction
- Chandil Junction
- Barabhum
- Purulia Junction

== Coach composition ==
The train has standard ICF rakes with a max speed of 110 kmph. The train consists of 9 coaches:

- 7 General Unreserved
- 2 Seating cum Luggage Rake

== Traction ==
Both trains are hauled by a Tatanagar Loco Shed-based WAM-4 electric locomotive from Jhargram to Purulia and vice versa.

== Rake sharing ==
The train shares its rake with 22875/22876 Kharagpur–Purulia Intercity Express and 12865/12866 Lalmati Express.

== See also ==
- Jhargram railway station
- Purulia Junction railway station
- Kharagpur–Purulia Intercity Express
- Lalmati Express
