= Lalmati Express =

Train in India

Overview
- Service type: Express
- First service: 30 December 2009; 16 years ago
- Last service: March 2020; 5 years ago
- Current operator: South Eastern Railway

Route
- Termini: Howrah Junction (HWH); Purulia Junction (PRR)
- Stops: 7
- Distance travelled: 185 km (115 mi)
- Average journey time: 5h 40m
- Service frequency: Bi-weekly (Note: Runs two days in a week for every direction.)
- Train number: 12865/12866

On-board services
- Classes: AC 2 tier, AC 3 tier, Sleeper class, General Unreserved
- Seating arrangements: No
- Sleeping arrangements: Yes
- Catering facilities: On-board catering E-catering
- Observation facilities: ICF coach
- Entertainment facilities: No
- Baggage facilities: No
- Other facilities: Below the seats

Technical
- Rolling stock: 2
- Track gauge: 1,676 mm (5 ft 6 in)
- Operating speed: 60 km/h (37 mph), including halts

The Lalmati Express was an Express train belonging to South Eastern Railway zone that runs between Howrah Junction and Purulia Junction in India. It was operated with 12865/12866 train numbers on bi-weekly basis.

== Service ==
The 12865/Lalmati Express has an average speed of 60 kilometres (37 mi) per hour and covers 339 kilometres (211 mi) in 5h 40m. The 12866/Lalmati Express has an average speed of 64 kilometres (40 mi) per hour and covers 339 kilometres (211 mi) in 5h 10m.

== Route and halts ==
The important halts of the train are:

- Howrah Junction
- Kharagpur Junction
- Jhargram
- Chakulia
- Ghatsila
- Tatanagar Junction
- Chandil
- Barabhum
- Purulia Junction

Presently the service between Howrah and Purulia is adjourned sine die.

== Coach composition ==
The train has standard ICF rakes with a max speed of 110 kmph. The train consists of 9 coaches:

- 1 Second Sitting
- 7 General Unreserved
- 2 Seating cum Luggage Rake

== Traction ==
Both trains are hauled by a Santragachi Loco Shed-based WAP-4 electric locomotive from Howrah to Purulia and vice versa.

== Rake sharing ==
The train shares its rake with 22875/22876 Kharagpur–Purulia Intercity Express and 22821/22822 Birsa Munda Express.
