= Purulia–Anand Vihar Terminal Express =

Train in India

Purulia - Anand Vihar Terminal Express

Overview
- Service type: Express
- Status: Active
- Locale: West Bengal, Jharkhand, Bihar, Uttar Pradesh and New Delhi
- First service: 3 April 2026; 6 months ago
- Current operator: Northern Railway (NR)

Route
- Termini: Purulia Junction (PRR); Anand Vihar Terminal (ANVT)
- Stops: 20
- Distance travelled: 1,404 km (872 mi)
- Average journey time: 30h 10m
- Service frequency: Weekly
- Train number: 14021 / 14022

On-board services
- Classes: General Unreserved, Sleeper Class, AC 1st Class, AC 2nd Class, AC 3rd Class
- Seating arrangements: Yes
- Sleeping arrangements: Yes
- Catering facilities: On board catering
- Observation facilities: Large windows
- Baggage facilities: No
- Other facilities: Below the seats

Technical
- Rolling stock: LHB coach
- Track gauge: 1,676 mm (5 ft 6 in)
- Electrification: 25 kV 50 Hz AC Overhead line
- Operating speed: 130 km/h (81 mph) maximum, 47 km/h (29 mph) average including halts.
- Track owner: Indian Railways

The 14021 / 14022 Purulia–Anand Vihar Terminal Express is an express train belonging to Northern Railway zone that runs between the city Purulia Junction of West Bengal and Anand Vihar Terminal of New Delhi, the capital city of India.

It operates as train number 14021 from Purulia Junction to Anand Vihar Terminal and as train number 14022 in the reverse direction, serving the states of New Delhi, Uttar Pradesh Bihar, Jharkhand and West Bengal.

== Services ==
• 14021/ Purulia–Anand Vihar Terminal Express has an average speed of 47 km/h and covers 1404 km in 30h 10m.

• 14022/ Anand Vihar Terminal–Purulia Express has an average speed of 47 km/h and covers 1404 km in 29h 40m.

== Routes and halts ==
The Important Halts of the train are :

- Purulia Junction
- Muri Junction
- Ranchi Junction
- Lohardaga
- Tori Junction
- Latehar
- Barwadih Junction
- Daltonganj
- Garwa Road Junction
- Japla
- Dehri-on-Sone
- Sasaram Junction
- Bhabua Road
- Pt. Deen Dayal Upadhyaya Junction
- Varanasi Junction
- Ayodhya Cantt Junction
- Lucknow Charbagh
- Bareilly Junction
- Moradabad Junction
- Anand Vihar Terminal

== Schedule ==
• 14021 - 5:00 PM (Friday) [Purulia Junction]

• 14022 - 5:00 AM (Thursday) [Anand Vihar Terminal]

== Coach composition ==
1. General Unreserved - 4
2. Sleeper Class - 7
3. AC 3rd Class - 6
4. AC 2nd Class - 2
5. AC 1st Class - 1

== Traction ==
As the entire route is fully electrified it is hauled by a Ghaziabad Shed-based WAP-7 electric locomotive from Purulia Junction to Anand Vihar Terminal and vice versa.

== Rake share ==
The train will Rake Sharing with Radhikapur–Anand Vihar Terminal Express (14011/14012).

== See also ==
Trains from Purulia Junction :

1. Rupashi Bangla Express
2. Purulia–Villupuram Superfast Express
3. Kharagpur–Purulia Intercity Express
4. Howrah–Purulia Express

Trains from Anand Vihar Terminal :

1. Haldia–Anand Vihar Terminal Superfast Express
2. West Bengal Sampark Kranti Express
3. Sairang–Anand Vihar Terminal Rajdhani Express
4. Anand Vihar Terminal–Ayodhya Cantonment Vande Bharat Express
5. Banaras-Anand Vihar Terminal Garib Rath Express

== Notes ==
a. Runs a day in a week with both directions.
