= Steel Express =

Train in India

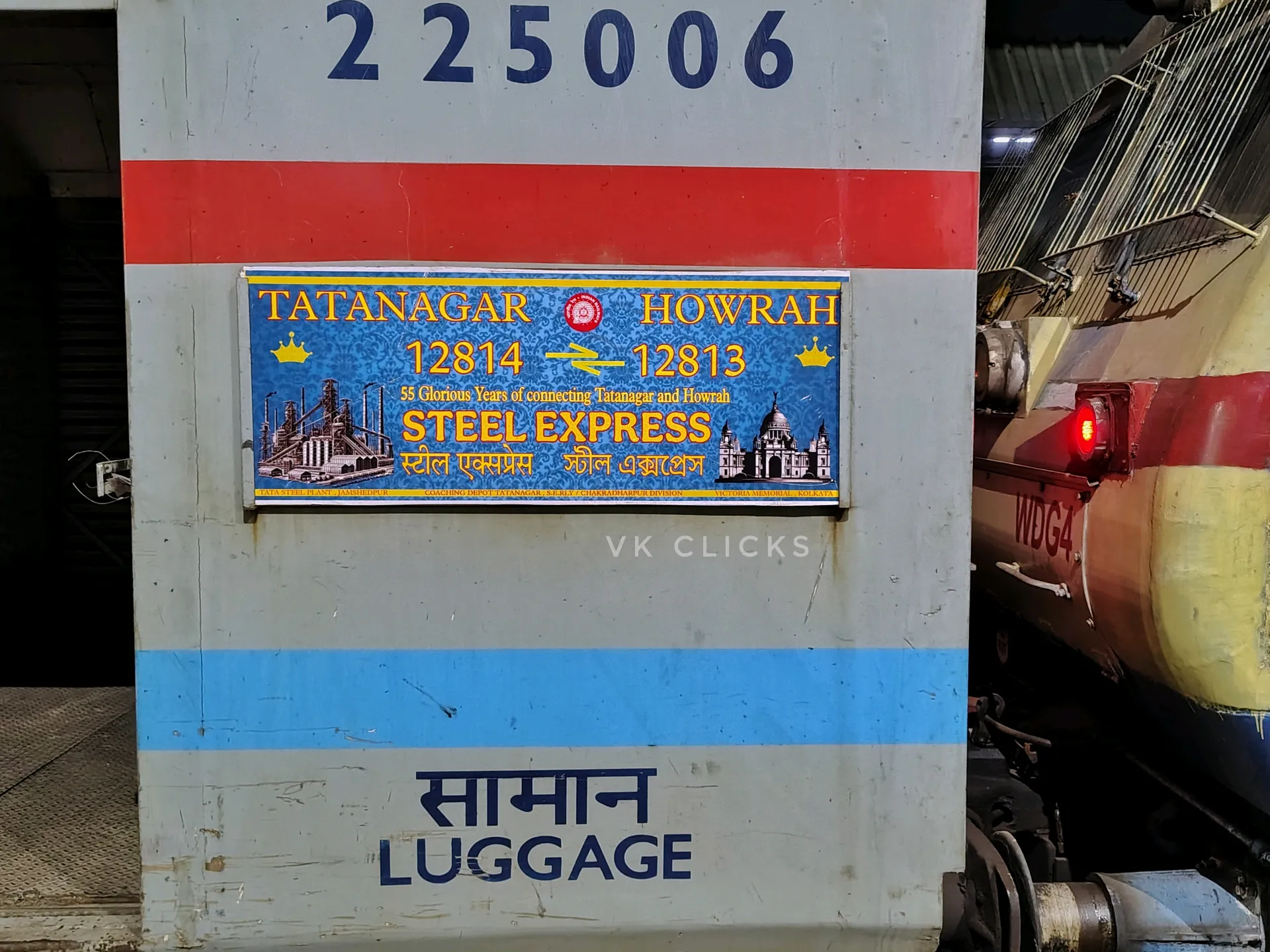
- "55 Years of Service" based new Train Board of Steel Express

Overview
- Service type: Express
- Locale: West Bengal & Jharkhand
- First service: 1 April 1970; 55 years ago
- Current operator: South Eastern Railways

Route
- Termini: Howrah (HWH); Tatanagar (TATA)
- Stops: 6 as 12814; 5 as 12813
- Distance travelled: 250 km (155 mi)
- Average journey time: 4 h 30 m as 12814; 4 h 5 m as 12813
- Service frequency: Daily
- Train number: 12813 / 12814

On-board services
- Classes: AC Executive Chair Car, AC 3 Tier Economy, AC Chair Car, 2nd Sitting, Unreserved
- Seating arrangements: Yes
- Sleeping arrangements: Yes, Only in AC 3 Tier Economy Coach
- Catering facilities: On-board catering, E-catering
- Observation facilities: Large windows
- Other facilities: Below the seats

Technical
- Rolling stock: LHB coach
- Track gauge: 1,676 mm (5 ft 6 in)
- Operating speed: 55 km/h (34 mph) as 12814; 61 km/h (38 mph) as 12813
Route map
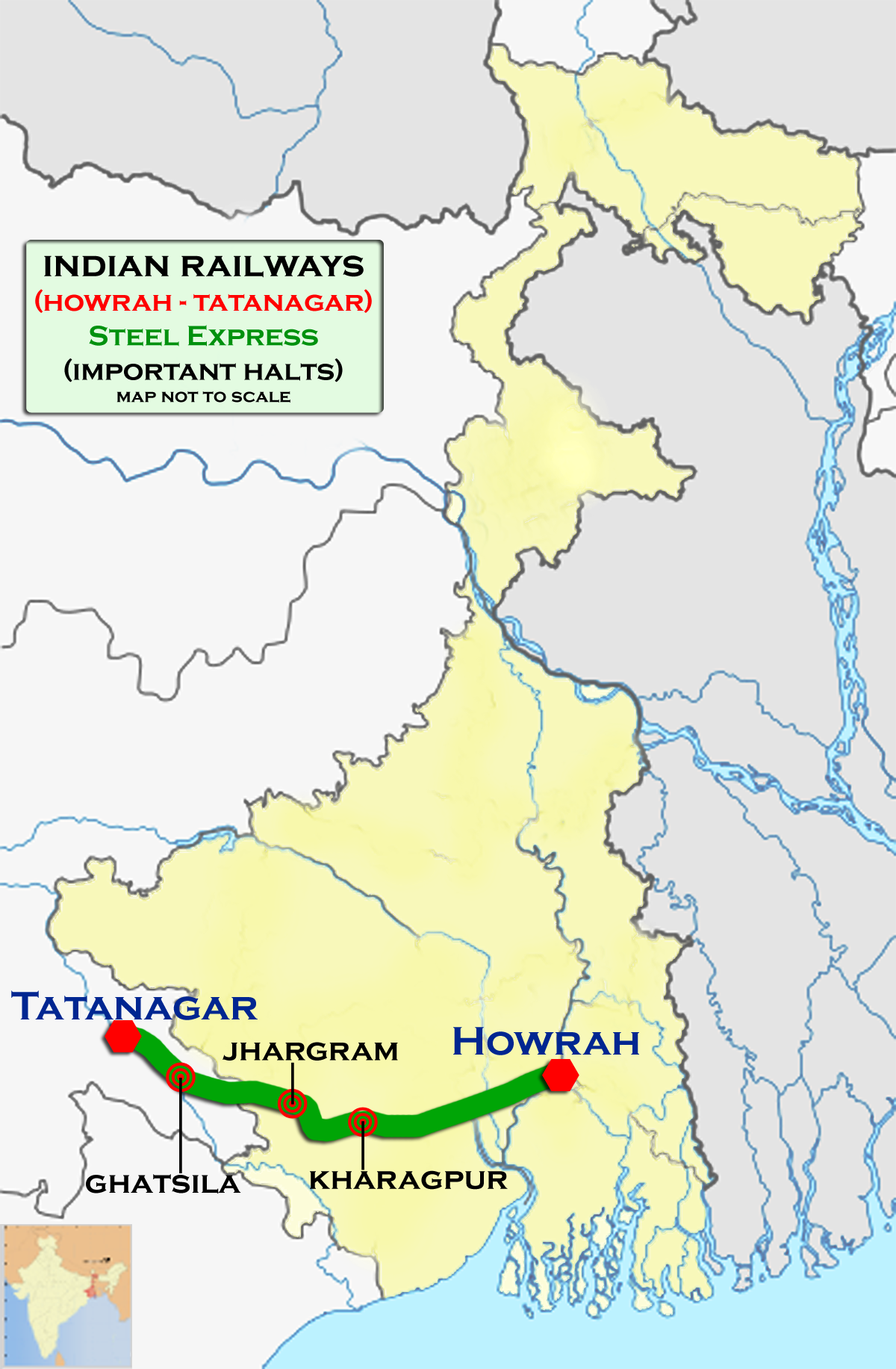

The 12813 / 12814 Steel Express is a Superfast class train operated by Indian Railways connecting Kolkata with the steel-producing city Jamshedpur in Jharkhand state.

It has a Single Dedicated Rake whose Primary Maintenance is done at Tatanagar coaching depot.

== Rake composition ==
It is running with LHB coach from 11 June 2018. Advance Reservation Period is of 30 days. Coach composition (22 coaches) is as follows :-

- 1 Seating cum Luggage coach
- 1 Power Generator Car (EOG)
- 4 Unreserved accommodation
- 10 Second Sitting Coaches
- 4 AC Chair Car
- 1 AC 3 Tier Economy
- 1 Executive Chair Car

Loco	1	2	3	4	5	6	7	8	9	10	11	12	13	14	15	16	17	18	19	20	21	22
	SLRD	GEN	GEN	D10	D9	D8	D7	D6	D5	D4	D3	D2	D1	M1	C4	C3	C2	C1	E1	GEN	GEN	EOG

== Route and halts ==
- Howrah
- Kharagpur
- Jhargram
- Chakulia
- Ghatsila
- Rakha Mines
- Tatanagar

== Traction ==
It is hauled by a Tatanagar, Santragachi or Bondamunda based WAP-7 locomotive from end to end.

== Time table ==
From Tatanagar to Howrah- 12814. The train starts from Tatanagar every day

Station code	Station name	Arrival	Departure
TATA	Tatanagar Jn	--	06:05
RHE	Rakha Mines	06:33	06:35
GTS	Ghatsila Jn	06:47	06:49
CKU	Chakulia Jn	07:10	07:12
JGM	Jhargram	07:32	07:34
KGP	Kharagpur Jn	08:18	08:20
SRC	Santragachi Jn	09:40	09:42
HWH	Howrah	10:35	--

From Howrah to Tatanagar – 12813. The train starts from Howrah every day.

Station code	Station name	Arrival	Departure
HWH	Howrah	--	17:20
KGP	Kharagpur Jn	18:58	19:00
JGM	Jhargram	19:30	19:32
CKU	Chakulia Jn	19:51	19:53
GTS	Ghatsila Jn	20:15	20:16
RHE	Rakha Mines	20:29	20:30
TATA	Tatanagar Jn	21:25	--
