= Khatkura railway station =

Railway Station in West Bengal

General information
- Location: Khatkura, Jhargram district, West Bengal; India
- Coordinates: 22.476924°N 86.932772°E
- Elevation: 86 m (282 ft)
- System: Passenger train station
- Owner: Indian Railways
- Operator: South Eastern Railway
- Line: Howrah–Nagpur–Mumbai line
- Platforms: 3

Construction
- Structure type: Standard (on ground station)

Other information
- Status: Functioning
- Station code: KATB
- Zone(s): South Eastern Railway zone
- Division(s): Kharagpur railway division

History
- Former names: Bengal Nagpur Railway
Location
- Location within India Location within West Bengal

Khatkura railway station is a railway station on Howrah–Nagpur–Mumbai line under Kharagpur railway division of South Eastern Railway zone. It is situated at Khatkura in Jhargram district in the Indian state of West Bengal. It is 7 km (4 mi) from Jhargram railway station and 89 km (55 mi) from Tatanagar Junction.
