= Kanimahuli railway station =

Railway Station in Jharkhand

Kanimahuli Railway Station
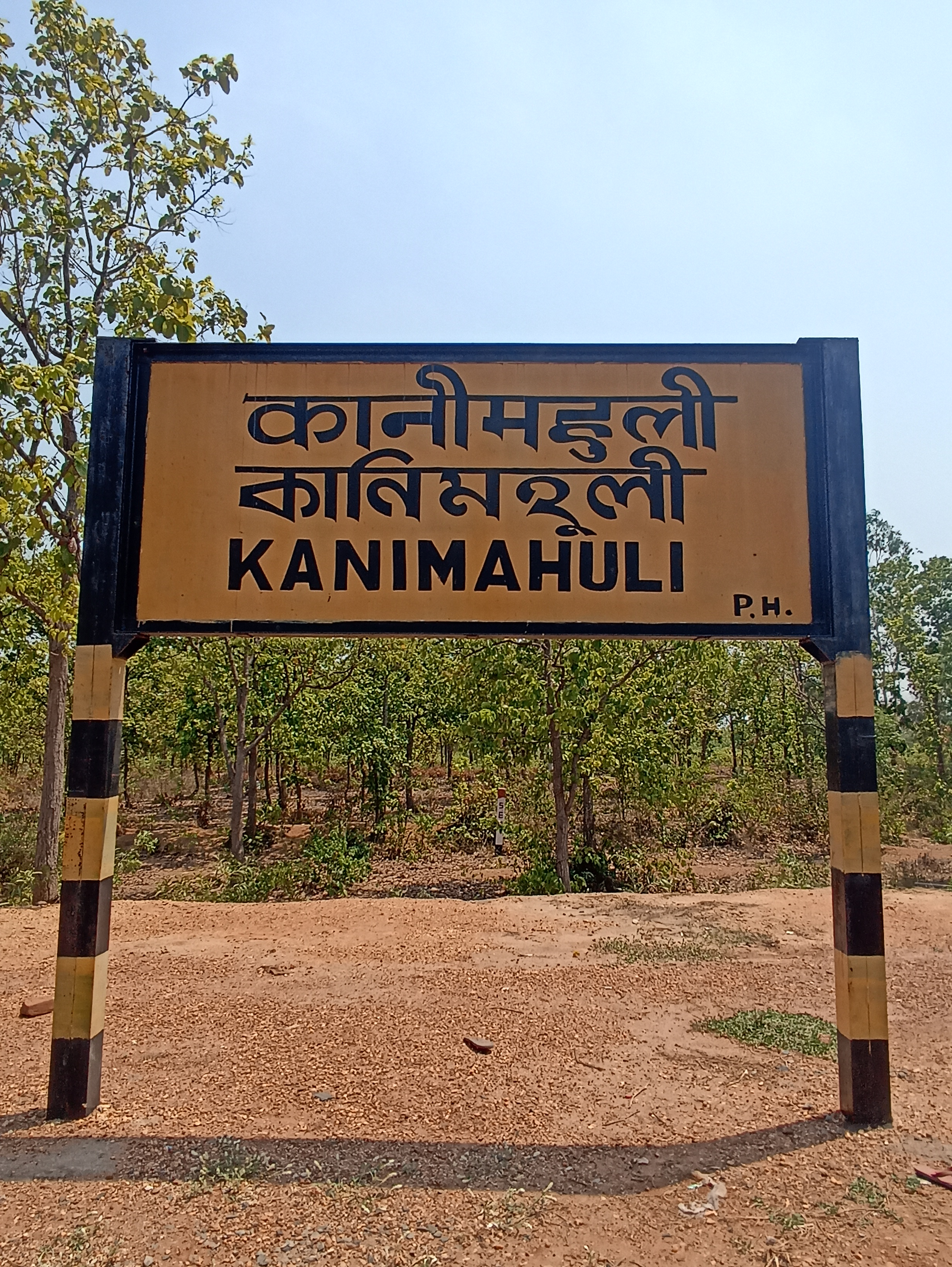
- Sign for Kanimahuli Railway Station

General information
- Location: State Highway 4, Kanimahuli, East Singhbhum district, Jharkhand; India
- Coordinates: 22.482675°N 86.779465°E
- Elevation: 110 m (360 ft)
- System: Passenger halt station
- Owner: Indian Railways
- Operator: South Eastern Railway
- Line: Howrah–Nagpur–Mumbai line
- Platforms: 2

Construction
- Structure type: Standard (on-ground station)

Other information
- Status: Functioning
- Station code: KNM
- Zone(s): South Eastern Railway zone
- Division(s): Kharagpur

History
- Former names: Bengal Nagpur Railway
Location
- Location within India Location within Jharkhand

Kanimahuli Railway Station is a railway station on Howrah–Nagpur–Mumbai line under Kharagpur railway division of South Eastern Railway zone. It is situated at Kanimahuli, Amdangra in East Singhbhum district in the Indian state of Jharkhand. It is 23 km (14 mi) from Jhargram railway station and 73 km (45 mi) from Tatanagar Junction.

It is the bordering station of Jharkhand on the Kharagpur–Tatanagar line of South Eastern Railway.
