= Tatanagar–Yesvantpur Weekly Express =

Indian express railway

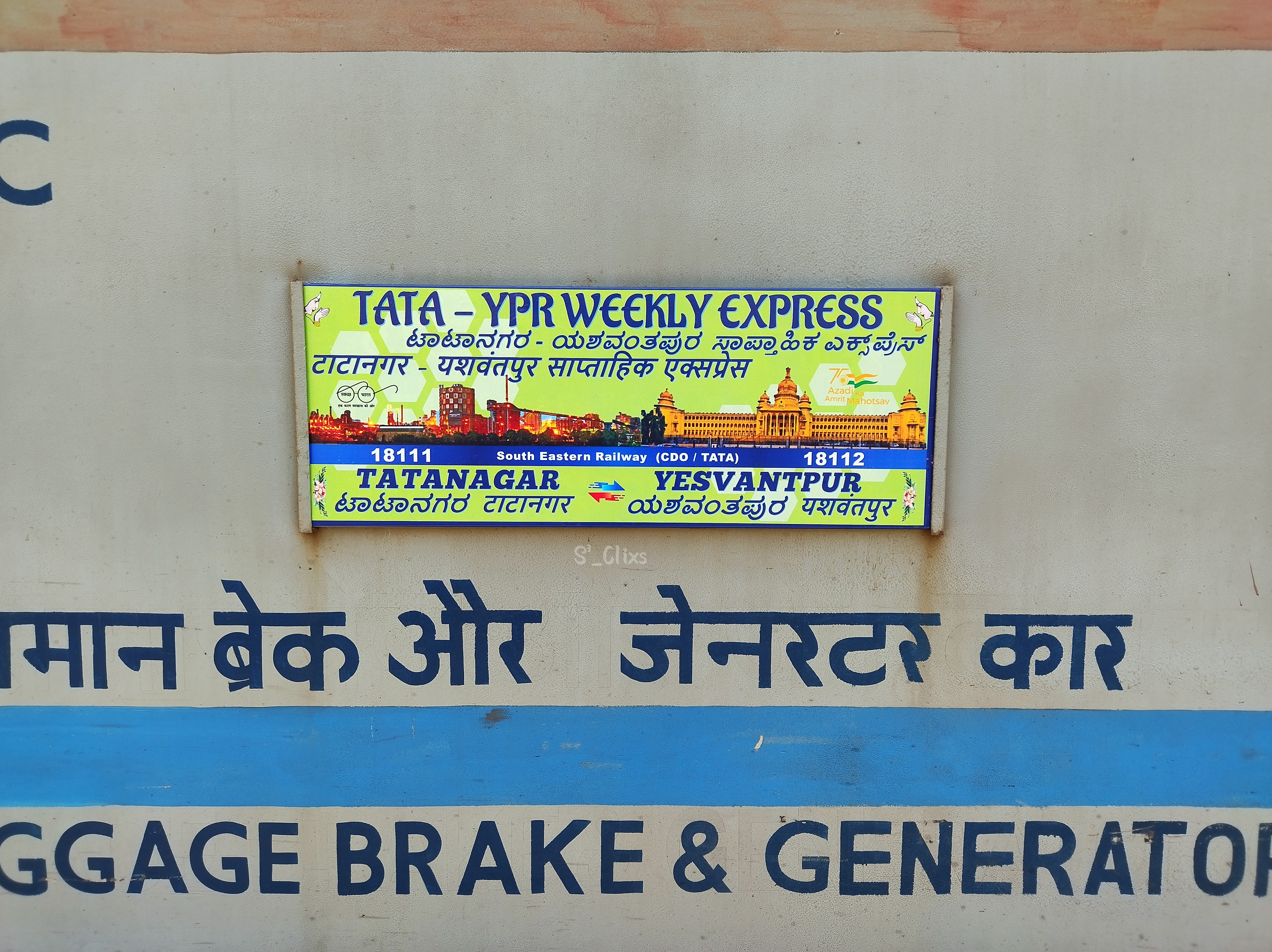
- Train Board of Tatanagar - Yesvantpur Weekly Express

Overview
- Service type: Express
- First service: 29 January 2015; 11 years ago
- Current operator: South Eastern Railway zone

Route
- Termini: Tatanagar Junction (TATA); Yesvantpur Junction (YPR)
- Stops: 38
- Distance travelled: 2,438 km (1,515 mi)
- Average journey time: 43 Hours 55 Mins as 18111 46 Hours 00 Mins as 18112
- Service frequency: Weekly (Note: Runs one day in a week for every direction.)
- Train number: 18111/18112

On-board services
- Classes: AC 2 tier, AC 3 tier, Sleeper class, General Unreserved
- Seating arrangements: No
- Sleeping arrangements: Yes
- Catering facilities: E-catering
- Observation facilities: LHB coach
- Entertainment facilities: No
- Baggage facilities: No
- Other facilities: Below the seats

Technical
- Track gauge: 1,676 mm (5 ft 6 in)
- Operating speed: 56 km/h (35 mph), including halts
Route map
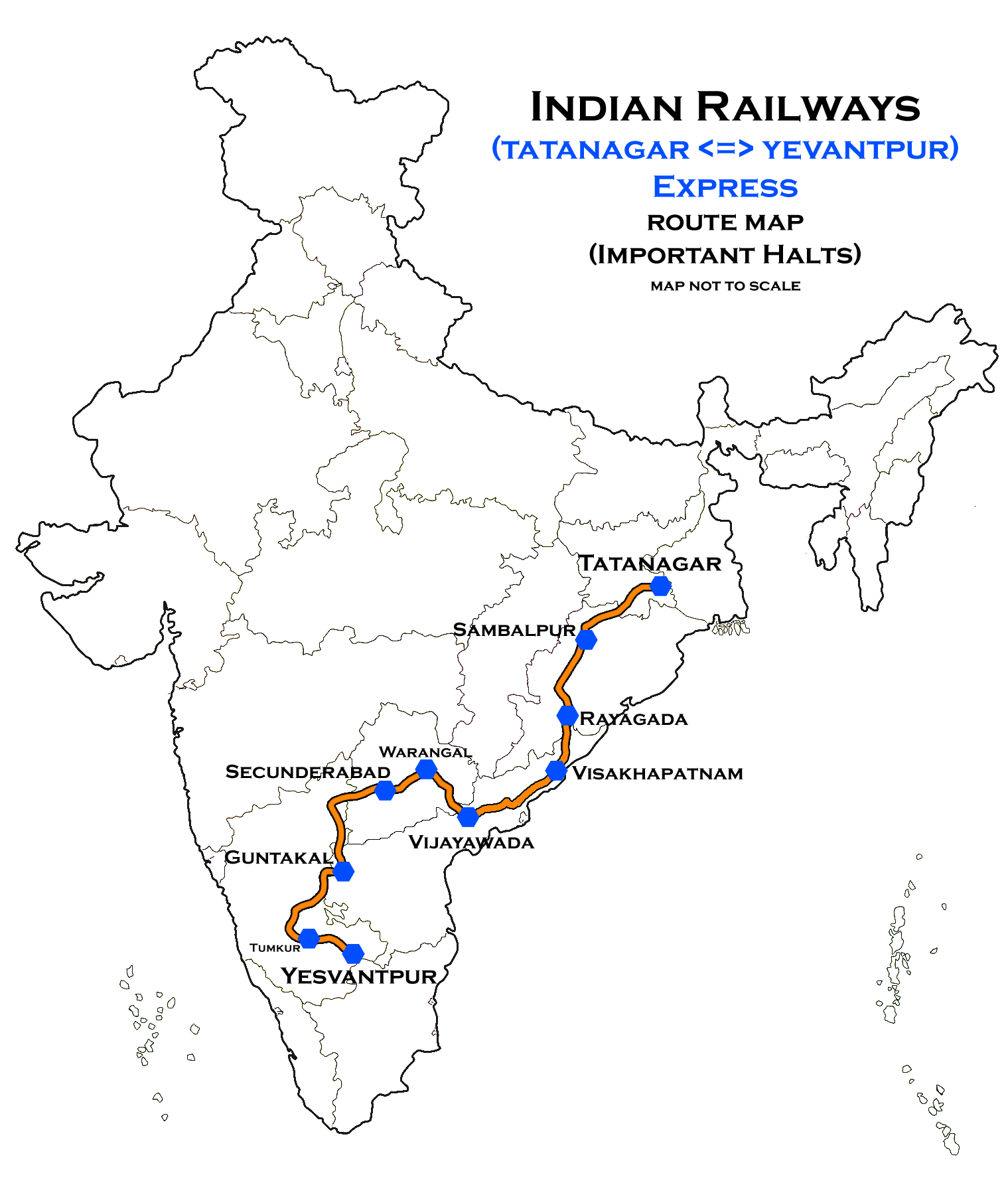

The Tatanagar–Yesvantpur Weekly Express is an Express train belonging to South Eastern Railway zone that runs between Tatanagar Junction and Yesvantpur Junction in India. It was being operated with 18111/18112 train numbers on a weekly basis.

== Service ==
The 18111/Tatanagar–Yesvantpur Weekly Express has an average speed of 56 km/h and covers 2438 km in 43h 55m. The 18112/Yesvantpur–Tatanagar Express has an average speed of 53 km/h and covers 2438 km in 46h 00 mins.

== Time table ==
From Tatanagar Jn to Yesvantpur - 18111. The train starts from Tatanagar Jn on every Thursday.

Station code	Station name	Arrival	Departure
TATA	Tatanagar Jn	---	18:35
CKP	Chakradharpur	19:23	19:28
ROU	Rourkela Jn	20:50	20:55
JSG	Jharsuguda Jn	22:30	22:35
SBP	Sambalpur Jn	23:25	23:35
BRGA	Bargarh Road	00:17	00:19
BLGR	Balangir Jn	01:16	01:21
TIG	Titlagarh Jn	02:20	12:30
KSNG	Kesinga	02:45	02:47
MNGD	Muniguda	03:53	03:55
RGDA	Rayagada	05:15	05:20
PVP	Parvatipuram	05:58	06:00
VBL	Bobbili Jn	06:23	06:25
VZM	Vizianagaram Jn	07:15	07:20
VSKP	Visakhapatnam Jn	08:35	08:55
SLO	Samalkot Jn	10:59	11:00
RJY	Rajahmundry	11:49	11:50
EE	Eluru	13:04	13:05
BZA	Vijayawada Jn	14:30	14:45
KMT	Khammam	15:19	15:20
WL	Warangal	17:18	17:20
MLY	Moula Ali	20:19	20:20
SC	Secunderabad Jn	20:45	21:00
LPI	Lingampalli	21:39	21:40
VKB	Vikarabad Jn	22:19	22:20
TDU	Tandur	22:49	22:50
CT	Chittapur	23:44	23:45
YG	Yadgir	00:44	00:45
RC	Raichur Jn	01:48	01:50
MALM	Mantralayam Road	02:09	02:10
AD	Adoni	02:39	02:40
BAY	Ballari Jn	04:50	04:55
MOMU	Molakalmuru	06:14	06:15
CHKE	Challakere	06:54	06:55
CTA	Chitradurga	07:23	07:25
RRB	Birur Jn	09:13	09:15
DRU	Kadur Jn	09:26	09:27
ASK	Arsikere Jn	10:15	10:20
TK	Tumakuru	11:10	11:12
BAW	Chikka Banavara Jn	12:01	12:02
YPR	Yesvantpur	13:40	---

Note : Train reverses its direction at Visakhapatnam Junction and Vijayawada Junction.

From Yesvantpur to Tatanagar Jn - 18112. The train starts from Yesvantpur on every Sunday.

Station code	Station name	Arrival	Departure
YPR	Yesvantpur	---	12:30
TK	Tumakuru	13:19	13:20
ASK	Arsikere Jn	14:35	14:40
DRU	Kadur Jn	15:11	15:12
RRB	Birur Jn	15:40	15:42
CTA	Chitradurga	17:03	17:05
CHKE	Challakere	17:39	17:40
MOMU	Molakalmuru	18:29	18:30
BAY	Ballari Jn	21:35	21:40
AD	Adoni	23:29	23:30
MALM	Mantralayam Road	00:09	00:10
RC	Raichur Jn	00:38	00:40
YG	Yadgir	01:39	01:40
CT	Chittapur	02:34	02:35
TDU	Tandur	03:29	03:30
VKB	Vikarabad Jn	03:59	04:00
LPI	Lingampalli	04:44	04:45
SC	Secunderabad Jn	05:58	06:05
MLY	Moula Ali	06:19	06:20
WL	Warangal	07:59	08:00
KMT	Khammam	09:39	09:40
BZA	Vijayawada Jn	12:15	12:30
EE	Eluru	13:14	13:15
RJY	Rajahmundry	14:44	14:45
SLO	Samalkot Jn	15:29	15:30
VSKP	Visakhapatnam Jn	20:00	20:20
VZM	Vizianagaram Jn	21:15	21:20
VBL	Bobbili Jn	22:03	22:05
PVP	Parvatipuram	22:28	22:30
RGDA	Rayagada	23:15	23:20
MNGD	Muniguda	00:18	00:20
KSNG	Kesinga	01:13	01:15
TIG	Titlagarh Jn	01:40	01:50
BLGR	Balangir Jn	02:41	02:46
BRGA	Bargarh Road	03:48	03:50
SBP	Sambalpur Jn	04:40	04:50
JSG	Jharsuguda Jn	06:20	06:25
ROU	Rourkela Jn	07:37	07:42
CKP	Chakradharpur	09:10	09:12
TATA	Tatanagar Jn	10:50	---

Note : Train reverses its direction at Visakhapatnam Junction and Vijayawada Junction.

== Coach composition ==
The train had standard LHB rakes with a maximum speed of 130 km/h. The train consists of 21 coaches:

- 2 AC II Tier
- 8 AC III Tier
- 7 Sleeper coaches
- 2 General Unreserved
- 1 Divyangjan cum Guard Coach
- 1 Generator Car

Loco	1	2	3	4	5	6	7	8	9	10	11	12	13	14	15	16	17	18	19	20	21
	EOG	GEN	GEN	S1	S2	S3	S4	S5	S6	S7	B1	B2	B3	B4	B5	B6	B7	B8	A1	A2	SLRD

== Traction ==
Both trains were hauled by a Tatanagar-based WAP-7 diesel locomotive from Tatanagar to Visakhapatnam. From Visakhapatnam, trains were hauled by a Vijayawada-based WAP-4 electric locomotive until Vijayawada. After Vijayawada, either another WAP-4 from Vijayawada took the charge or a Lallaguda based WAP-7 hauled the train. From Guntakal, trains were hauled by either Guntakal-based twin WDM-3A or twin WDG-3A or Diesel Loco Shed, Gooty WDM-3A twin diesel locomotive until Yesvantpur and vice versa.

== Direction reversal ==
The train reverses its direction twice:

- Visakhapatnam Junction
- Vijayawada Junction

== See also ==
- Tatanagar Junction railway station
- Yesvantpur Junction railway station
- Tatanagar–Yesvantpur Superfast Express
