= Ranchi–Howrah Vande Bharat Express =

Mini Vande Bharat Express train route in India

Ranchi Junction - Howrah Junction Vande Bharat Express

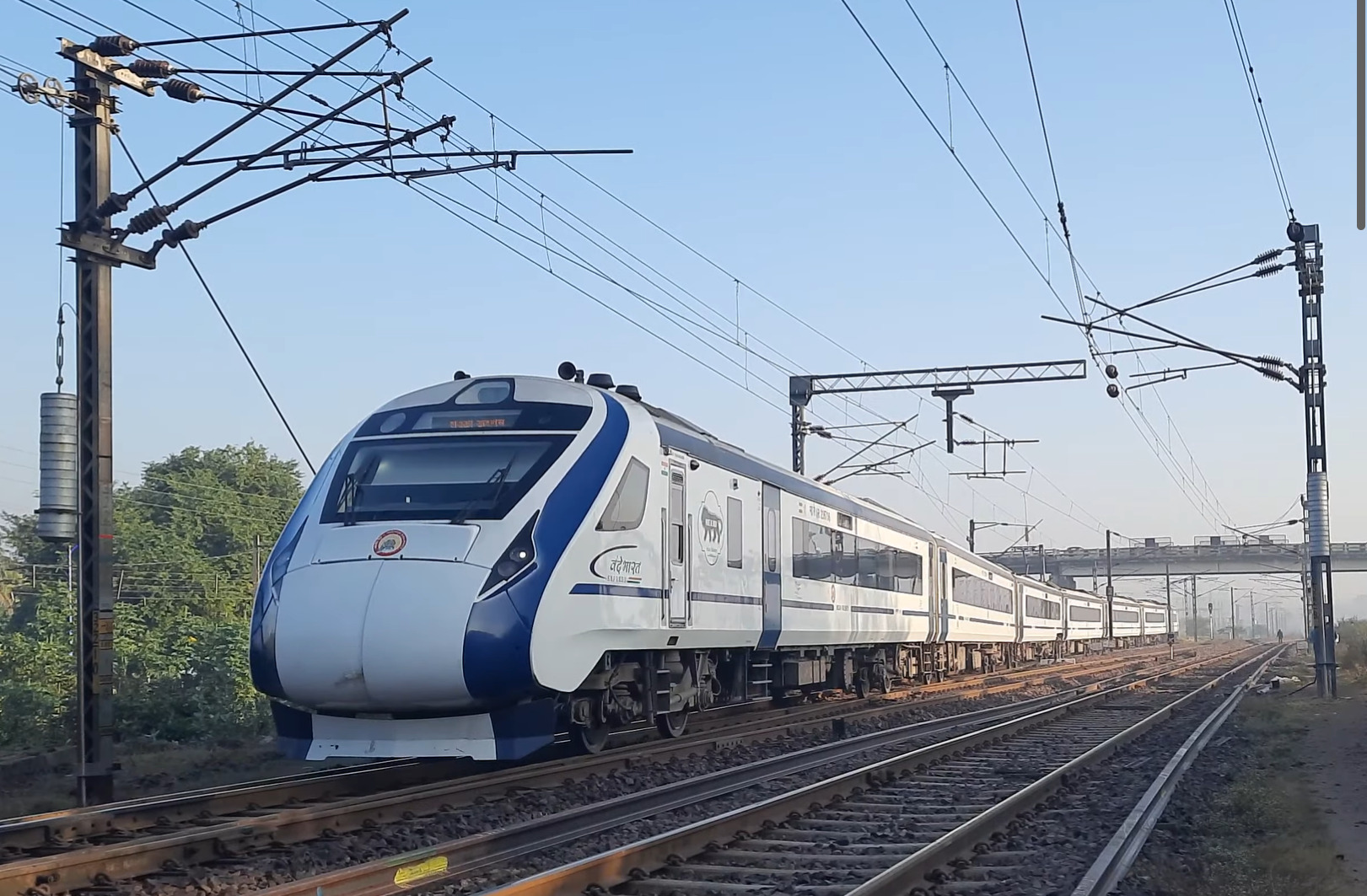
- This Mini VB Express train heading towards Howrah Junction railway station

Overview
- Service type: Vande Bharat Express
- Locale: Jharkhand and West Bengal
- First service: 24 September 2023 (Inaugural run); 27 September 2023; 2 years ago (Commercial run)
- Current operator: South Eastern Railway (SER)

Route
- Termini: Ranchi Junction (RNC); Howrah Junction (HWH)
- Stops: 6
- Distance travelled: 458 km (285 mi)
- Average journey time: 07 hrs 05 mins
- Service frequency: Six days a week (Note: Except Tuesdays)
- Train number: 20898 / 20897
- Lines used: Howrah–Kharagpur line Asansol-Tatanagar-Kharagpur line (Kharagpur-Kotshila); Gomoh-Hatia line (Muri-Ranchi)

On-board services
- Classes: AC Chair Car, AC Executive Chair Car
- Seating arrangements: Airline style; Rotatable seats
- Sleeping arrangements: No
- Catering facilities: On board Catering
- Observation facilities: Large windows in all coaches
- Entertainment facilities: On-board WiFi; Infotainment System; Electric outlets; Reading light; Seat Pockets; Bottle Holder; Tray Table
- Baggage facilities: Overhead racks
- Other facilities: Kavach

Technical
- Rolling stock: Mini Vande Bharat 2.0
- Track gauge: Indian gauge 1,676 mm (5 ft 6 in) broad gauge
- Electrification: 25 kV 50 Hz AC Overhead line
- Operating speed: 65 km/h (40 mph) (Avg.)
- Average length: 192 metres (630 ft) (08 coaches)
- Track owner: Indian Railways
- Rake maintenance: Ranchi Jn (RNC)

The 20898/20897 Ranchi - Howrah Vande Bharat Express is India's 31st Vande Bharat Express train, connecting the city of Ranchi in Jharkhand with Howrah in West Bengal. This train was inaugurated on 24 September 2023 by Prime Minister Narendra Modi via video conference from New Delhi.

The route of Ranchi-Howrah Vande Bharat train has been diverted. According to the information, now this train will go to Ranchi and come via Howrah, Kharagpur, Midnapore, Adra, Purulia, Muri. The green signal for this has been received from the Railways. Which will be effective on 3 December.

== Overview ==
This train is operated by Indian Railways, connecting Ranchi Jn, Muri Jn, Kotshila Jn, Purulia Jn, Chandil Jn, Tatanagar Jn, Kharagpur Jn and Howrah Jn. It is currently operated with train numbers 20898/20897 on 6 days a week basis.

== Rakes ==
It is the twenty-ninth 2nd Generation and seventeenth Mini Vande Bharat 2.0 Express train which was designed and manufactured by the Integral Coach Factory at Perambur, Chennai under the Make in India Initiative.

This rake was converted from Blue-White livery to Saffron-Grey livery due to attraction of passengers and better services in terms of more advanced features that were incorporated in the new trainset. This became operational from July 12 2024.

== Service ==
The 20898/20897 Ranchi Jn - Howrah Jn Vande Bharat Express operates six days a week except Tuesdays, covering a distance of 458 km (285 mi) in a travel time of 7 hours with an average speed of 64 km/h (40 mph). The service has 6 intermediate stops. The Maximum Permissible Speed is 130 km/h (81 mph).

== See also ==
- Vande Bharat Express
- Tejas Express
- Gatimaan Express
- Ranchi Junction railway station
- Howrah railway station
