= Tatanagar–SMVT Bengaluru Weekly Superfast Express =

Train in the South Eastern Railway zone, India

Tatanagar–SMVT Bangaluru Weekly Superfast Express
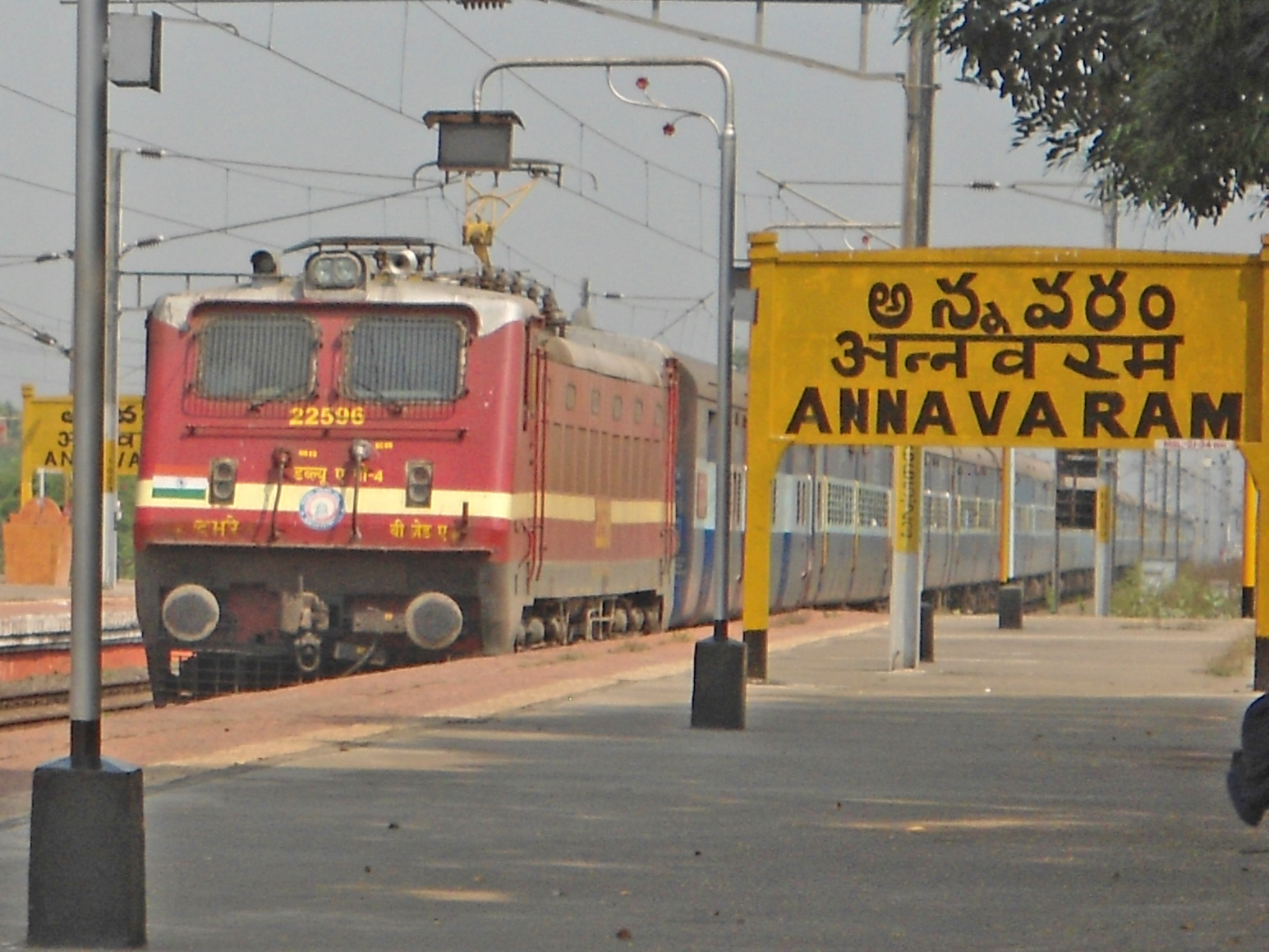
- Then Yesvantpur Junction bound Weekly Superfast Express from Tatanagar with old ICF coach at Annavaram in Andhra Pradesh with a WAP-4 from Electric Loco Shed, Vijayawada

Overview
- Service type: Superfast
- Current operator: South Eastern Railway zone

Route
- Termini: Tatanagar Junction (TATA); Sir M. Visvesvaraya Terminal, Bengaluru (SMVB)
- Stops: 22
- Distance travelled: 1,883 km (1,170 mi)
- Average journey time: 33h 30m as 12889; 33h 20m as 12890
- Service frequency: Weekly (Note: Runs one day in a week for every direction.)
- Train number: 12889/12890

On-board services
- Classes: AC 2 tier, AC 3 tier, AC 3 Economy, Sleeper class, General Unreserved
- Seating arrangements: No
- Sleeping arrangements: Yes
- Catering facilities: Pantry car On-board catering E-catering
- Observation facilities: LHB coach
- Entertainment facilities: No
- Baggage facilities: No
- Other facilities: Below the seats

Technical
- Rolling stock: 2
- Track gauge: 1,676 mm (5 ft 6 in)
- Operating speed: 58 km/h (36 mph), including halts
Route map
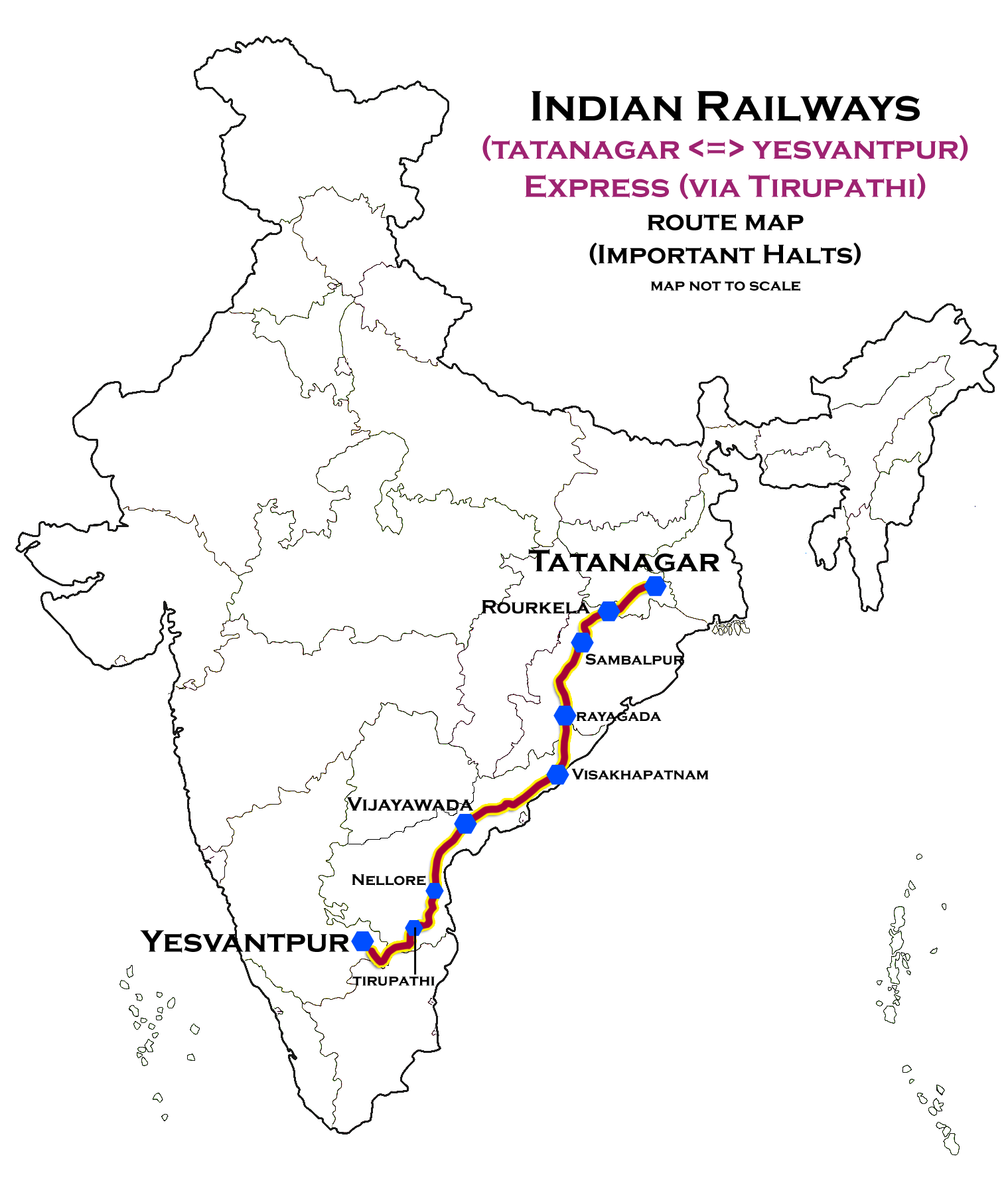

The 12889 / 12890 Tatanagar–SMVT Bengaluru Weekly Superfast Express is a Superfast Express train belonging to South Eastern Railway zone that runs between Tatanagar Junction and Sir M. Visvesvaraya Terminal, Bengaluru in India. It is currently being operated on a weekly basis.

== Service ==
The 12889 Tatanagar – SMVT Bengaluru Superfast Express has an average speed of 55 km (34 mi) per hr and covers 1,884 km (1,171 mi) in 34h 25m. The 12890 SMVT Bengaluru – Tatanagar Superfast Express has an average speed of 55 km (34 mi) per hr and covers 1,748 km (1,086 mi) in 34h 30m. It received New LHB coach from 11 April 2019. The Train 12889 Tatanagar – SMVT Bengaluru Superfast Express started to Terminate at the new Sir. M. Visvesvaraya Terminal, Bengaluru from 15 July 2022 instead of earlier Yesvantpur Junction. Similarly, Train 12890 SMVT Bengaluru – Tatanagar Superfast Express started its journey from the new Sir. M. Visvesvaraya Terminal, Bengaluru instead of earlier Yesvantpur Junction with effective from 18 July 2022.

== Route and halts ==
The important halts of the train are:

- Tatanagar Junction
- Chakradharpur
- Rourkela Junction
- Jharsuguda Junction
- Visakhapatnam Junction
- Samalkot
- Rajahmundry
- Eluru
- Vijayawada Junction
- Ongole
- Nellore
- Gudur Junction
- Renigunta Junction
- Tirupati
- Katpadi Junction
- Sir M. Visvesvaraya Terminal

== Coach composition ==
The train has modern LHB rakes with a max speed of 110 kmph. The train consists of 21 coaches:

- 3 AC II Tier
- 5 AC III Tier
- 3 AC III Economy
- Pantry Car
- 6 Sleeper coaches
- 2 Second Class
- 2 EOG (End on Generation)

== Traction ==
From Tatanagar to Visakhapatnam Junction, it is hauled by Tatanagar Based WAP 7 And from Visakhapatnam Junction To Sir M. Visvesvaraya Terminal by Lallaguda based WAP 7 .

== Rake sharing ==
The train shared its rake with 18103/18104 Tatanagar–Amritsar Jallianwalla Bagh Express

== Timing ==
- 12889 – starts from Tatanagar Junction every Friday at 5:45 PM and reaches Sir M. Visvesvaraya Terminal on 3rd day at 3:15 AM IST
- 12890 – starts from Sir M. Visvesvaraya Terminal every Monday at 8:50 AM and reaches Tatanagar Junction on 2nd day at 6:10 PM IST

== See also ==
- Tatanagar Junction Railway Station
- Sir M. Visvesvaraya Terminal Railway Station
- Jallianwalla Bagh Express
- Tatanagar–Amritsar Jallianwalla Bagh Express
