= Gourinathdham railway station =

Railway station in West Bengal

Gourinathdham

General information
- Location: NH 32, Gourinathdham, Purulia district, West Bengal; India
- Coordinates: 23.3958°N 86.2746°E
- Elevation: 277 metres (909 ft)
- System: Indian Railways station
- Owner: Indian Railways
- Operator: South Eastern Railway
- Line: Purulia–Kotshila line

Construction
- Structure type: Standard at ground
- Parking: No
- Cycle facilities: No

Other information
- Station code: GTD
- Division(s): Adra

History
- Opened: 1907
- Electrified: 1998–99
- Former names: Bengal Nagpur Railway

Services
Preceding station	Indian Railways	Following station
Purulia towards ?	South Eastern Railway zone Purulia–Kotshila line	Chas Road towards ?
Location
- Location within West Bengal Location within India

Gourinathdham railway station serves Gourinathdham and surrounding areas in Purulia district in the Indian state of West Bengal.

== The railway station ==
The railway station is on NH 18. It is located at an altitude of 277 metres (909 ft) above sea level. It has a single platform and track doubling work is going on from middle of the year 2018 and also a new platform built then it has 2 platforms. The railway station was allotted the station code of GTD and is under the jurisdiction of Adra railway division of South Eastern Railway.

== History ==
The Purulia–Ranchi line was opened as a 2 ft 6 in (762 mm)-wide narrow-gauge railway in 1907. It was named Ranchi–Purulia Railway and operated by Bengal Nagpur Railway. The Kotshila–Ranchi sector was converted to 5 ft 6 in (1,676 mm) broad gauge in 1962 and the Purlia–Kotshila sector in 1992.

== Electrification ==
The Purulia–Kotshila sector was electrified in 1998–99.
