= Tatanagar–Amritsar Jallianwalla Bagh Express =

Train in India

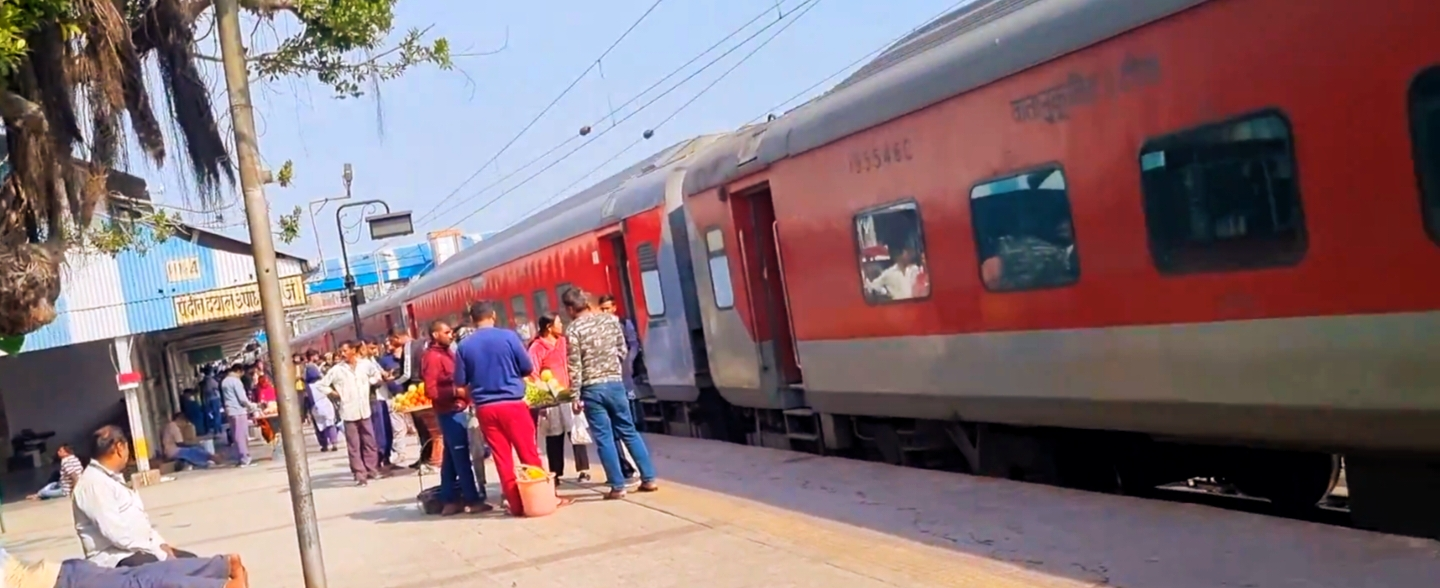

Overview
- Service type: Express
- First service: 13 April 2003; 22 years ago
- Current operator: South Eastern Railway

Route
- Termini: Tatanagar (TATA); Amritsar (ASR)
- Stops: 25
- Distance travelled: 1,747 km (1,086 mi)
- Average journey time: 33 hrs 20 mins
- Service frequency: Bi-weekly (Note: Runs two days in a week for every direction.)
- Train number: 18103 / 18104

On-board services
- Classes: AC 2 tier, AC 3 tier, Sleeper class, General Unreserved
- Seating arrangements: Yes
- Sleeping arrangements: Yes
- Catering facilities: Available
- Observation facilities: Large windows
- Baggage facilities: No
- Other facilities: Below the seats

Technical
- Rolling stock: LHB coach
- Track gauge: 1,676 mm (5 ft 6 in)
- Operating speed: 53 km/h (33 mph) average including halts.

The 18103 / 18104 Tatanagar-Amritsar Jallianwalla Bagh Express is an Express train belonging to South Eastern Railway zone that runs between Tatanagar Junction and Amritsar Junction in India. It is currently being operated with 18103/18104 train numbers on bi-weekly basis.

== Service ==
The 18103 Jallianwalabagh Express has an average speed of 52 km/h and covers 1747 km in 33h 20m. The 18104 Jallianwalabagh Express has an average speed of 54 km/h and covers 1747 km in 32h 25m.

== Route and halts ==
The important halts of the train are:

- Tatanagar Junction
- Purulia Junction
- Bokaro Steel City
- Netaji Subhas Chandra Bose Gomoh
- Koderma Junction
- Gaya Junction
- Mughalsarai Junction
- Varanasi Junction
- Faizabad Junction
- Lucknow Charbagh
- Bareilly Junction
- Moradabad Junction
- Laksar Junction,
- Roorkee
- Saharanpur Junction
- Ambala Cantonment Junction
- Ludhiana Junction
- Jalandhar City Junction
- Amritsar Junction

== Coach composition ==
The train has Modern LHB Rakes with a maximum speed of 110 km/h. The train consists of 22 coaches :

- 1 AC II Tier
- 5 AC III Tier
- 10 Sleeper Coaches
- 3 Second Sitting cum General Coaches
- 1 Pantry Car Coach
- 1 Divyangjan cum Guard Coach
- 1 Generator Car

Loco	1	2	3	4	5	6	7	8	9	10	11	12	13	14	15	16	17	18	19	20	21	22
	EOG	B1	B2	B3	B4	B5	A1	PC	S1	S2	S3	S4	S5	S6	S7	S8	S9	S10	GEN	GEN	GEN	SLRD

== Traction ==
Both trains are hauled by a Tatanagar-based WAP-7 electric locomotive from Tatanagar to Amritsar, and vice versa.

== Rake sharing ==
The train shared its rake with 12889/12890 Tatanagar–SMVT Bengaluru Weekly Superfast Express.

== Schedule ==
Train number	Station code	Source	Departure time (IST)	Departure day	Destination	Arrival time	Arrival day
18103	TATA	Tatanagar	9:10 PM	Monday, Wednesday	Amritsar	6:30 AM	Wednesday, Friday
18104	ASR	Amritsar	12:45 PM	Wednesday, Friday	Tatanagar	9:10 PM	Thursday, Saturday

== See also ==
- Tatanagar Junction railway station
- Amritsar Junction railway station
- Sealdah-Amritsar Jallianwalla Bagh Express
- Tatanagar–SMVT Bengaluru Weekly Superfast Express
