= Gidhni railway station =

Railway Station in West Bengal

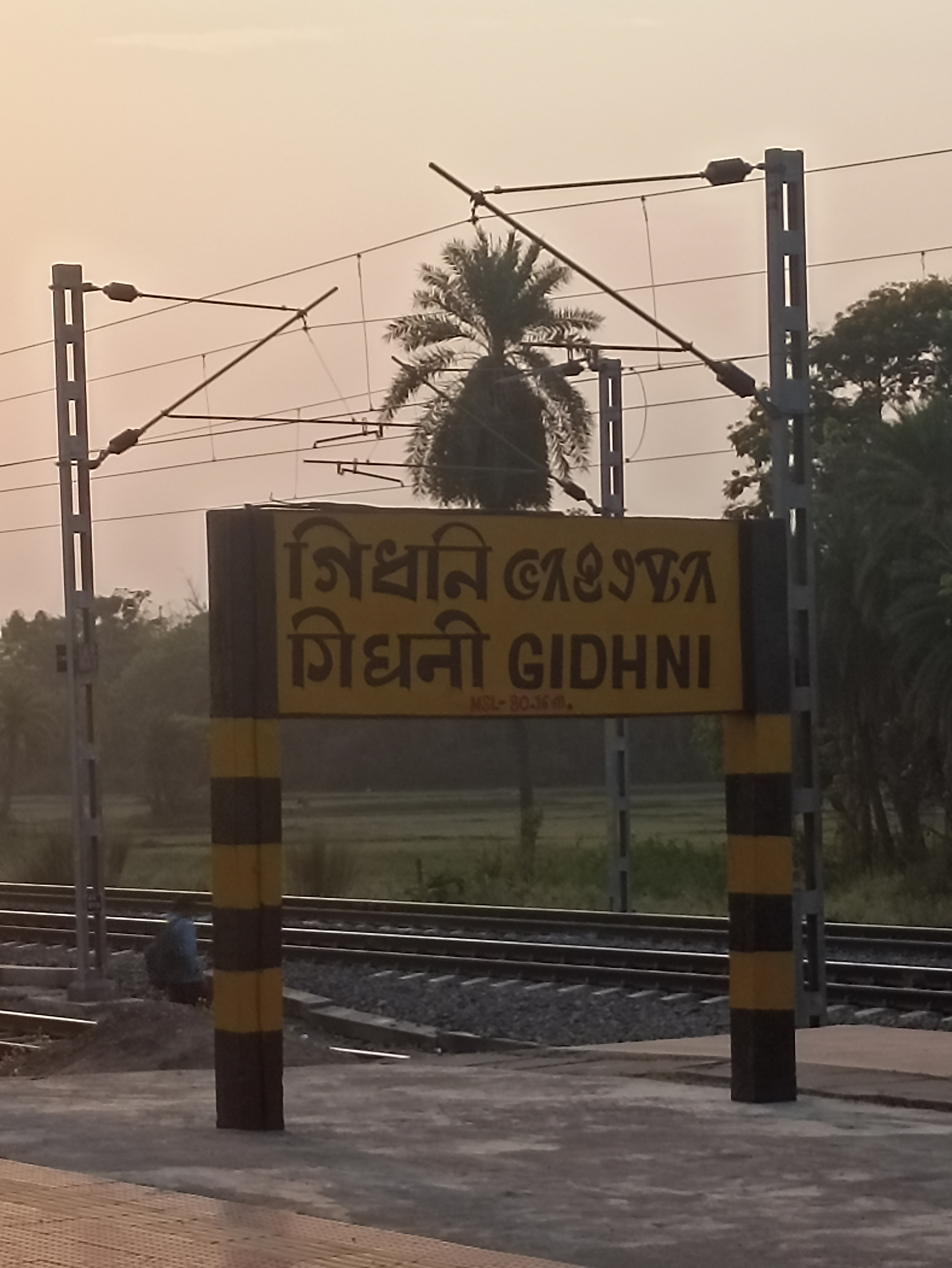
- Gidhni railway station sign

General information
- Location: State Highway 9, Gidhni, Jhargram district, West Bengal; India
- Coordinates: 22.488155°N 86.853345°E
- Elevation: 84 m (276 ft)
- System: Passenger train station
- Owner: Indian Railways
- Operator: South Eastern Railway
- Line: Howrah–Nagpur–Mumbai line
- Platforms: 4

Construction
- Structure type: Standard (on-ground station)

Other information
- Status: Functioning
- Station code: GII
- Zone(s): South Eastern Railway zone
- Division(s): Kharagpur

History
- Former names: Bengal Nagpur Railway
Location
- Location within India Location within West Bengal

Gidhni railway station is a railway station where no train stops. railway station on Howrah–Nagpur–Mumbai line under Kharagpur railway division of South Eastern Railway zone. It is situated at Gidhni in Jhargram district in the Indian state of West Bengal. It is 16 km (10 mi) from Jhargram railway station and 80 km (50 mi) from Tatanagar Junction.

It is the bordering station of West Bengal on the Kharagpur–Tatanagar line of South Eastern Railway.
