= Joychandi Pahar Junction railway station =

Railway station in West Bengal, India

JOYCHANDI PAHAR JUNCTION

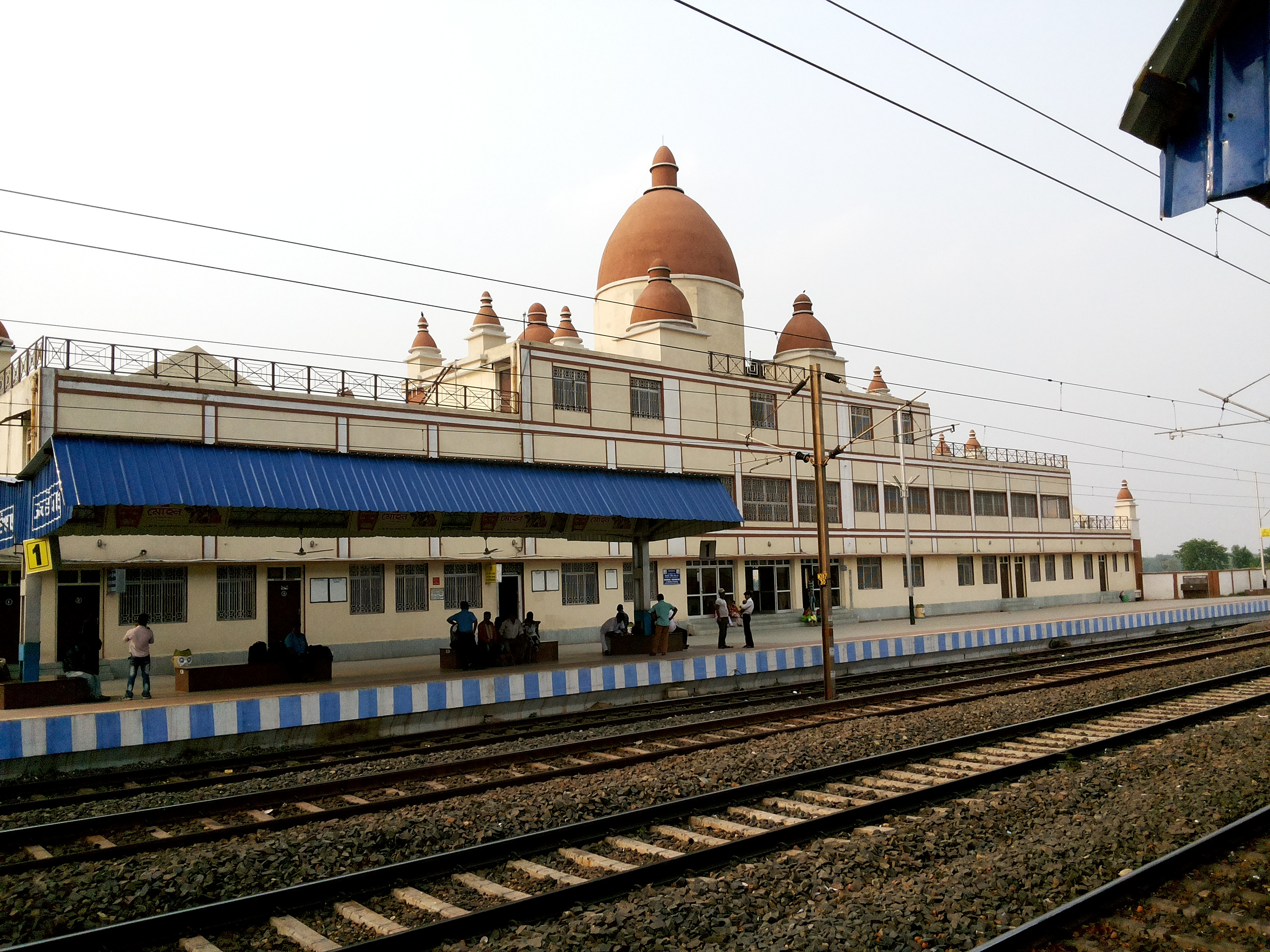
- New building of the Joychandi Pahar station

General information
- Location: Adra circle, Joychandi Pahar-Adra road, Raghunathpur I, Purulia district, West Bengal; India
- Coordinates: 23.5168°N 86.6809°E
- Elevation: 155 metres (509 ft)
- System: Indian Railways
- Owner: Indian Railways
- Operator: South Eastern Railways
- Line: Asansol–Tatanagar–Kharagpur line
- Platforms: 3
- Tracks: 6

Construction
- Structure type: At Ground
- Parking: Available
- Cycle facilities: Not available

Other information
- Status: Functional
- Station code: JOC
- Zone(s): South Eastern Railway zone
- Division(s): Adra
- Website: www.irctc.co.in/nget/train-search

History
- Opened: 1891; 135 years ago
- Electrified: 1957–62
- Former names: Bengal Nagpur Railway
Services
Preceding station	Indian Railways	Following station
Bero towards ?	South Eastern Railway zone Asansol–Adra section	Adra towards ?
Route map
Location
- Location within West Bengal Location within India
- Interactive map of Joychandi Pahar Junction

Joychandi Pahar Junction railway station (station code: JOC) serves Adra town and Raghunathpur in Purulia district in the Indian state of West Bengal. It was named after the hill called Joychandi Pahar which is located between these two towns. Joychandipahar rail station is situated on the Asansol–Purulia–Sini main line section. In the year of 2014 it was redeveloped and made as an alternative station of Adra Junction to decongest Adra station from a huge passenger and freight traffic.

== Trains ==
- Tatanagar–Thawe Express
- Tatanagar–Katihar Express
- Tatanagar–Buxar Express
- Tatanagar–Asansol Express
- South Bihar Express
- New Tinsukia–Tambaram Express
- Tambaram–Jasidih Weekly Superfast Express
- Nagaon Express
- Bilaspur–Buxar SF Express

== History ==
The Bengal Nagpur Railway was formed in 1887 for the purpose of upgrading the Nagpur Chhattisgarh Railway and then extending it via Bilaspur to Asansol, in order to develop a shorter Howrah–Mumbai route than the one via Allahabad. The Bengal Nagpur Railway main line from Nagpur to Asansol, on the Howrah–Delhi main line, was opened for goods traffic on 1 February 1891. Later it was modified as the bypass rail station of Adra Junction to decongest Adra station .

== Electrification ==
The Tatanagar–Adra–Asansol section was electrified in the 1957–1962 period.

== New station building ==
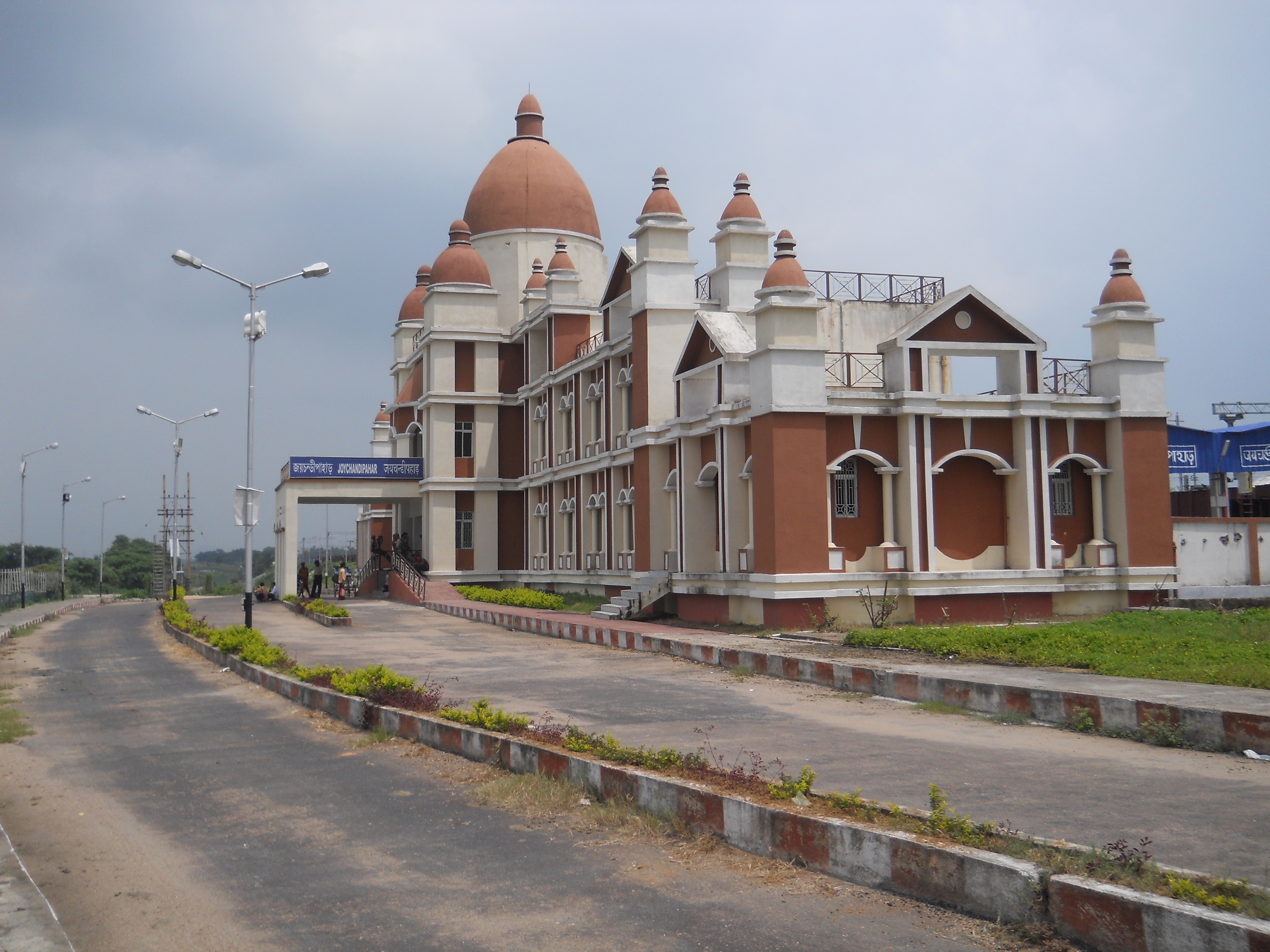
Joychandi Hill Railway Station, New Building

A new station building at Joychandi Pahar railway station was inaugurated on 4 February 2013 by Adhir Ranjan Chowdhury, Union minister of state for Railways.
