= Tatanagar–Katihar Express =

Train in India

Overview
- Service type: Express
- Status: Active
- Locale: Bihar, West Bengal & Jharkhand
- Current operator: South Eastern Railway

Route
- Termini: Tatanagar (TATA); Katihar (KIR)
- Stops: 28
- Distance travelled: 591 km (367 mi)
- Average journey time: 17 hours 35 minutes
- Service frequency: Tri-Weekly (Note: Runs three days in a week for every direction.)
- Train number: 28181 / 28182

On-board services
- Classes: AC 2 tier, AC 3 tier, Sleeper class, Second class seating, General Unreserved
- Seating arrangements: Yes
- Sleeping arrangements: Yes
- Auto-rack arrangements: Overhead racks
- Catering facilities: On-board catering, E-catering
- Observation facilities: Large windows
- Baggage facilities: No
- Other facilities: Below the seats

Technical
- Rolling stock: LHB coach
- Track gauge: 1,676 mm (5 ft 6 in)
- Operating speed: 34 km/h (21 mph) average including halts.

The 28181 / 28182 Tatanagar–Katihar Express is an Express train belonging to South Eastern Railway zone that runs between Tatanagar Junction and Katihar Junction in India. It is currently being operated with 28181/28182 train numbers on a tri-weekly basis.

== Service ==
The 28181/Tatanagar–Katihar Express has an average speed of 34 km/h and covers 591 km in 17h 20m. The 28182/Katihar–Tatanagar Express has an average speed of 39 km/h and covers 591 km in 15h 20m.

== Route and halts ==
The important halts of the train are:

- Tatanagar Junction
- Purulia Junction
- Joychandi Pahar railway station (Adra Junction alternative)
- Asansol Junction
- Jasidih Junction
- Jhajha
- Kiul Junction
- New Barauni
- Khagaria Junction
- Mansi Junction
- Naugachia
- Katihar Junction

== Coach composition ==
The train has standard ICF rakes with a maximum speed of 110 km/h. The train consists of 23 coaches:

- 1 AC II Tier
- 3 AC III Tier
- 12 Sleeper coaches
- 5 Second Seating coaches
- 2 Seating cum Luggage Rake

== Traction ==
Both trains are hauled by a Tatanagar Loco Shed-based WAP-7 or Asansol Loco Shed-based WAP-4 electric locomotive from Tatanagar to Asansol. From Asansol, trains are hauled by a Asansol Loco Shed-based WAP-4 electric locomotive uptil Katihar and vice versa.

== Slip coaches ==
It used to run linked with Tatanagar-Thawe Express (then running up to Chhapra) up to Barauni and used to get detached there to continue its journey. This system was discontinued during suspension of train services during COVID-19 pandemic in India.

== Rake Sharing ==
It shares its rake with Tatanagar-Thawe Express (formerly Tatanagar-Chhapra Express).

== Direction reversal ==
The train reverses its direction 1 time:

- Asansol Junction

== See also ==
- Tatanagar Junction railway station
- Katihar Junction railway station
- Utsarg Express
- Tatanagar-Thawe Express
