= Tatanagar–Asansol Express =

Train in India

Overview
- Service type: Express
- First service: 18 February 2012; 13 years ago
- Current operator(s): Eastern Railway

Route
- Termini: Asansol (ASN); Tatanagar (TATA)
- Stops: 7
- Distance travelled: 165 km (103 mi)
- Average journey time: 4 hrs 30 mins
- Service frequency: Tri-weekly (Note: Runs three days in a week for every direction.)
- Train number(s): 13511 / 13512

On-board services
- Class(es): Chair Car, General Unreserved
- Seating arrangements: Yes
- Sleeping arrangements: No
- Auto-rack arrangements: Overhead racks
- Catering facilities: E-catering
- Observation facilities: Large windows
- Baggage facilities: No
- Other facilities: Below the seats

Technical
- Rolling stock: ICF coach
- Track gauge: 1,676 mm (5 ft 6 in)
- Operating speed: 36 km/h (22 mph) average including halts.

The 13511 / 13512 Tatanagar–Asansol Express is an Express train belonging to Eastern Railway zone that runs between Asansol Junction and Tatanagar Junction in India. It is currently being operated with 13511/13512 train numbers on tri-weekly basis.

== Service ==
The 13511/Tatanagar–Asansol Express has an average speed of 47 km/h and covers 165 km in 3h 30m. The 13512/Asansol–Tatanagar Express has an average speed of 50 km/h and covers 165 km in 3h 20m.

== Route and halts ==
The important halts of the train are:

- Tatanagar Junction
- Kandra Junction
- Chandil Junction
- Barabhum
- Purulia Junction
- Anara
- Joychandi Pahar( Adra Junction alternative)
- Burnpur
- Asansol Junction

== Coach composition ==
The train has standard ICF rakes with max speed of 110 kmph. The train consists of 10 coaches :

- 1 Second Sitting
- 7 General
- 2 Seating cum Luggage Rake

== Traction ==
Both trains are hauled by an Asansol Loco Shed based WAG-9 electric locomotive from Tatanagar to Asansol and vice versa.

== See also ==
- Tatanagar Junction railway station
- Asansol Junction railway station
