= Tatanagar–Thawe Express =

Train in India

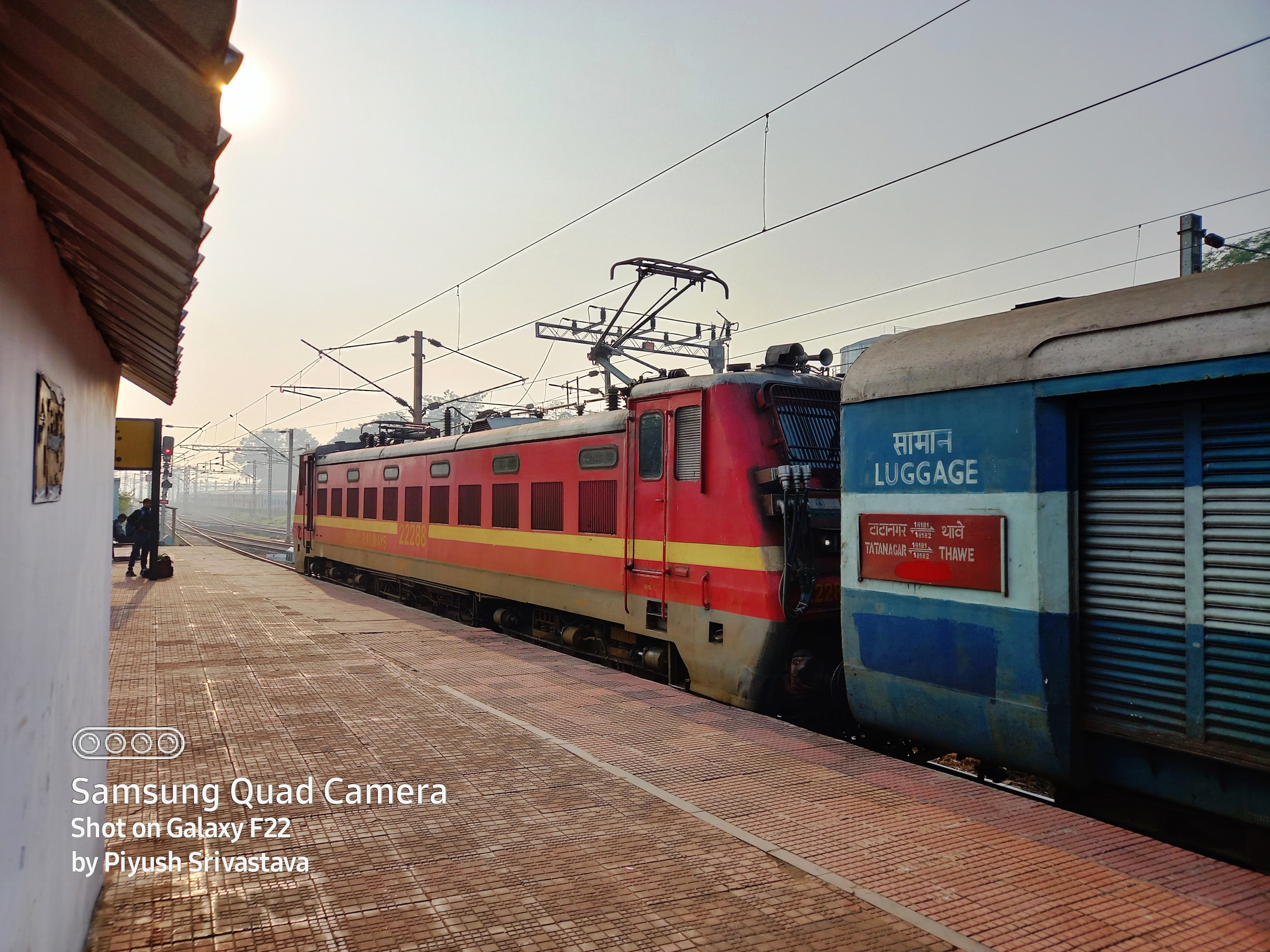
- Tatanagar Thawe Express standing at Tatanagar with Asansol based WAP-4.

Overview
- Service type: Express
- Status: Active
- Locale: Bihar, West Bengal & Jharkhand
- First service: 15 August 1977; 48 years ago (extended to Thawe)
- Current operator: South Eastern Railway
- Ridership: The train was extended to Thawe due to passenger demand, indicating high traffic demand between these regions.

Route
- Termini: Tatanagar (TATA); Thawe (THE)
- Stops: 37
- Distance travelled: 718 km (446 mi)
- Average journey time: 19 hrs 50 mins
- Service frequency: 4 days a week. (Note: Runs four days in a week for every direction.)
- Train number: 18181 / 18182

On-board services
- Classes: AC 2 Tier, AC 3 Tier, Sleeper Class, General Unreserved
- Seating arrangements: No
- Sleeping arrangements: Yes
- Catering facilities: On-board catering, E-catering
- Observation facilities: Large windows
- Baggage facilities: No
- Other facilities: Below the seats

Technical
- Rolling stock: LHB coach
- Track gauge: 1,676 mm (5 ft 6 in)
- Operating speed: 36 km/h (22 mph) average including halts

The 18181 / 18182 Tatanagar–Thawe Express is an express train belonging to South Eastern Railway zone that runs between Tatanagar Junction and Thawe Junction in India. It is currently being operated with 18181/18182 train numbers on a quad-weekly basis.

== Service ==
The 18181/Tatanagar–Thawe Express has an average speed of 36 km/h and covers 718 km in 19h 50 m. The 18182/Thawe–Tatanagar Express has an average speed of 36 km/h and covers 718 km in 20h 10m.

== Route and halts ==
The important halts of the train are:

- Tatanagar Junction
- Purulia Junction
- Joychandi Pahar (Adra Junction alternative)
- Asansol Junction
- Jasidih Junction
- Jhajha
- Kiul Junction
- Barauni Junction
- Samastipur Junction
- Muzaffarpur Junction
- Hajipur Junction
- Chhapra Junction
- Siwan Junction
- Thawe Junction

== Coach composition ==
The train has standard ICF rakes with a maximum speed of 110 km/h. The train consists of 23 coaches:

- 1 AC II Tier
- 3 AC III Tier
- 12 Sleeper coaches
- 5 Second Seating cum General coaches
- 2 Seating cum Luggage Rake

== Traction ==
Both trains are hauled by a Santragachi Loco Shed-based WAP-4 electric locomotive from Tatanagar to Thawe and vice versa.

== Extension ==
The train ran between Tatanagar and Samastipur when introduced. It got extended to Muzaffarpur later. This was again extended to Gorakhpur during early 1990s but later got short terminated to Chhapra. The train was again extended to Thawe Junction from 12 April 2021 on the request of Gopalganj MP, Dr. Alok Kumar Suman.

== Rake sharing ==
The train shared its rake with 15083/15084 Utsarg Express before COVID-19 pandemic in India. Currently it shares its rake with Tatanagar-Katihar Express.

== Slip coaches ==
It used to carry the slip coaches of Tatanagar-Katihar Express before COVID-19 pandemic in India, which used to get detached at Barauni Junction. Now Tatanagar-Katihar Express is running independently (now via New Barauni) with Rake Sharing with this train.

== Direction reversal ==
The train reverses its direction 1 times:

- Asansol Junction

== See also ==
- Tatanagar Junction railway station
- Chhapra Junction railway station
- Utsarg Express
