= Kharagpur–Villupuram Superfast Express =

Train in India

Kharagpur–Viluppuram Biweekly Superfast Express
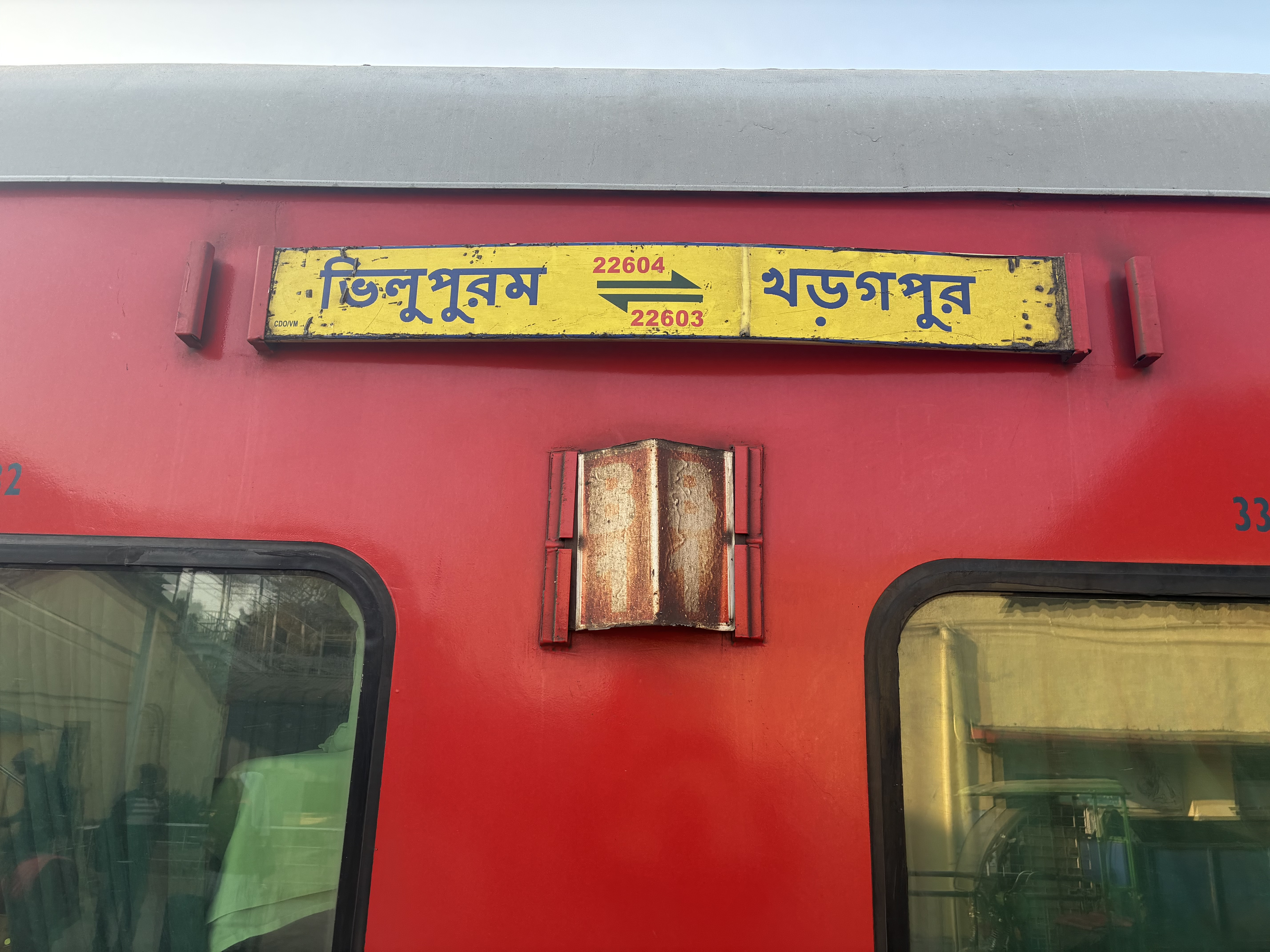
- Kharagpur - Viluppuram Superfast Express train direction board

Overview
- Service type: Superfast Express
- First service: 22 February 2012; 14 years ago
- Current operator: Southern Railway zone

Route
- Termini: Kharagpur Junction (KGP); Viluppuram Junction (VM)
- Stops: 18
- Distance travelled: 1,779 km (1,105 mi)
- Average journey time: 31h 15m
- Service frequency: Bi-weekly (Note: Runs one day in a week for every direction.)
- Train number: 22603/22604

On-board services
- Classes: AC 2 tier, AC 3 tier, Sleeper class, General Unreserved
- Seating arrangements: No
- Sleeping arrangements: Yes
- Catering facilities: On-board catering E-catering
- Observation facilities: LHB coach
- Entertainment facilities: No
- Baggage facilities: No
- Other facilities: Below the seats

Technical
- Rolling stock: 2
- Track gauge: 1,676 mm (5 ft 6 in)
- Operating speed: 57 km/h (35 mph), including halts
Route map
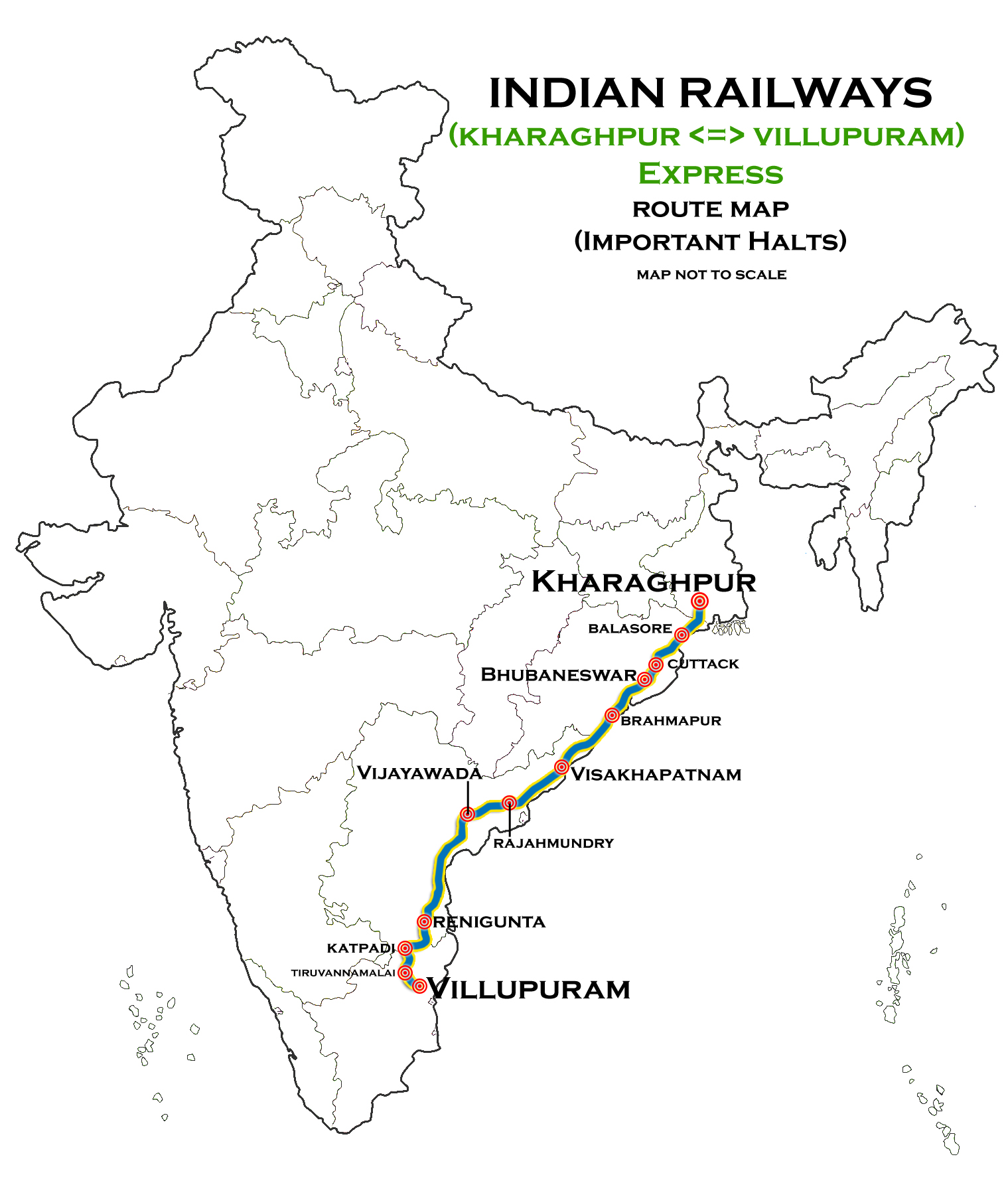

The Kharagpur–Viluppuram Superfast Express is an Superfast Express train belonging to Southern Railway zone that runs between Kharagpur Junction and Viluppuram Junction in India. It is operating with 22603/22604 train numbers on a weekly basis.

== Service ==
The 22603/Kharagpur–Viluppuram Superfast Express has an average speed of 63 km/h (39 mph) and covers 1,831 km (1,138 mi) in 29h 5m. The 22604/Viluppuram–Kharagpur Superfast Express has an average speed of 58 km/h (36 mph) and covers 1,831 km (1,138 mi) in 31h 30m.

== Route and halts ==
The important halts of the train are:

- Kharagpur Junction
- Belda
- Balasore
- Jajpur Keonjhar Road
- Cuttack Junction
- Bhubaneswar
- Khurda Road Junction
- Brahmapur
- Vizianagaram Junction
- Visakhapatnam Junction
- Rajahmundry
- Eluru
- Vijayawada Junction
- Gudur Junction
- Perambur
- Arakkonam Junction
- Katpadi Junction
- Tiruvannamalai
- Viluppuram Junction

== Coach composition ==
The train has LHB rakes with a max speed of 130 kmph. The train consists of 17 coaches:

- 1 AC II Tier
- 2 AC III Tier
- 8 Sleeper coaches
- 4 General Unreserved
- 1 Seating cum Luggage Rake & 1 EOG

== Traction ==
Both trains are hauled by an Erode Loco Shed-based WAP-4 electric locomotive from Kharagpur to Viluppuram and vice versa.

== Rake sharing ==
The train shares its rake with 22605/22606 Purulia–Villupuram Superfast Express.

== Direction reversal ==
The train reverses its direction 1 times:

- Visakhapatnam Junction

== Demands ==
There are demands to extend this train till Puducherry from Villupuram Junction.

== See also ==
- Kharagpur Junction railway station
- Viluppuram Junction railway station
- Purulia–Villupuram Superfast Express
