= Kharagpur–Purulia Intercity Express =

Train in India

Overview
- Service type: Intercity
- Current operator: South Eastern Railway zone

Route
- Termini: Kharagpur Junction (KGP); Purulia Junction (PRR)
- Stops: 12
- Distance travelled: 208 km (129 mi)
- Average journey time: 4h
- Service frequency: Tri-weekly (Note: Runs three days in a week for every direction.)
- Train number: 22875/22876

On-board services
- Classes: AC 2 tier, AC 3 tier, Sleeper class, General Unreserved
- Seating arrangements: No
- Sleeping arrangements: Yes
- Catering facilities: On-board catering E-catering
- Observation facilities: ICF coach
- Entertainment facilities: No
- Baggage facilities: No
- Other facilities: Below the seats

Technical
- Rolling stock: 2
- Track gauge: 1,676 mm (5 ft 6 in)
- Operating speed: 52 km/h (32 mph), including halts
Route map
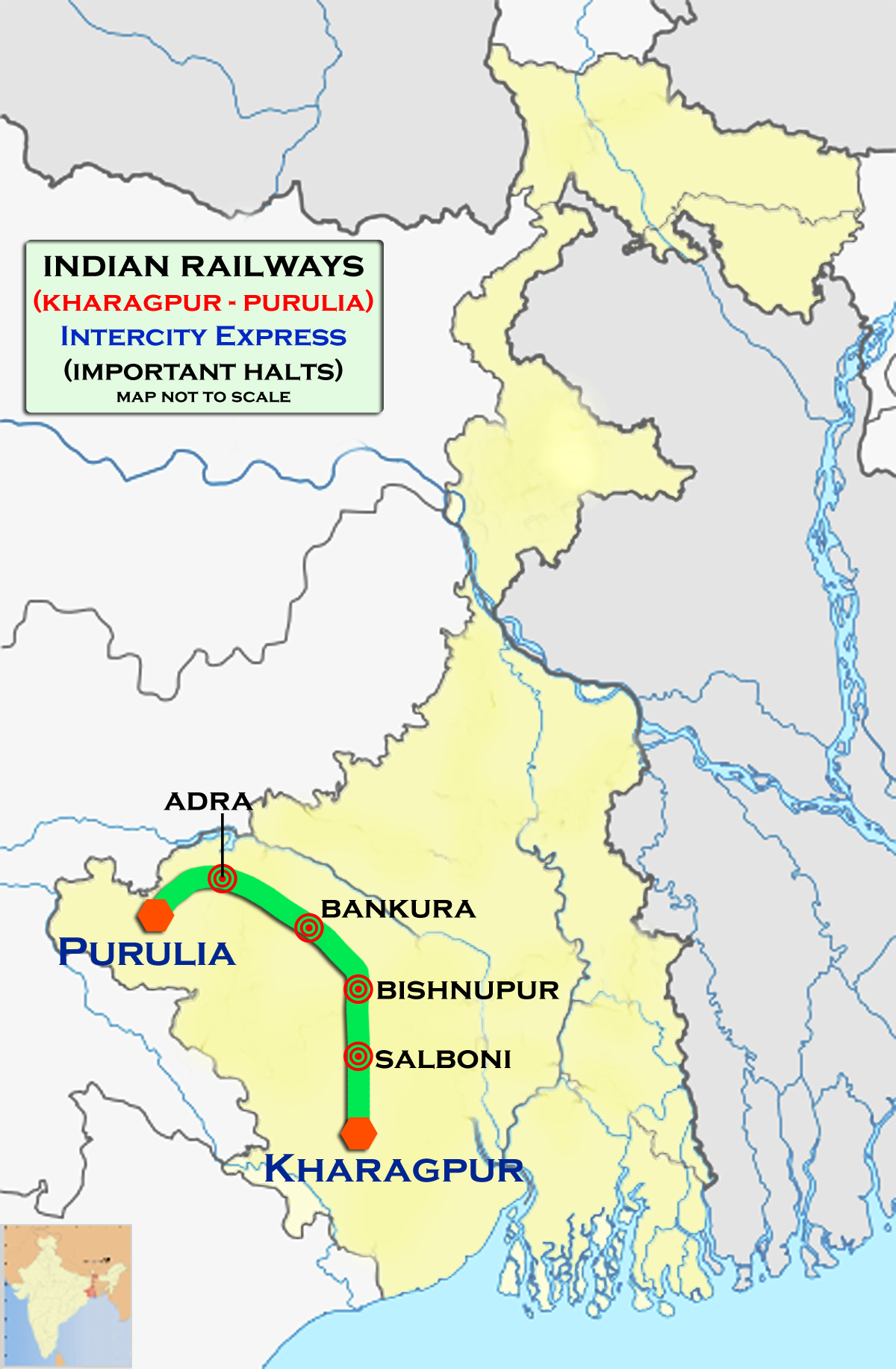

The Kharagpur–Purulia Intercity Express is an Intercity train belonging to South Eastern Railway zone that runs between Kharagpur Junction and Purulia Junction in India. It is currently being operated with 22875/22876 train numbers on tri-weekly basis.

== Service ==
The 22875/Kharagpur–Purulia Intercity Express has an average speed of 52 km/h and covers 208 km in 4h. The 22876/Purulia–Kharagpur Intercity Express has an average speed of 53 km/h and covers 208 km in 3h 55m.

== Route and halts ==
The important halts of the train are:

- Kharagpur Junction
- Midnapore
- Bhadutala
- Salboni
- Chandrakona Road
- Garbeta
- Bishnupur
- Ondagram
- Bankura Junction
- Chhatna
- Jhantipahari
- Adra Junction
- Anara
- Purulia Junction

== Coach composition ==
The train has standard ICF rakes with a maximum speed of 110 kmph. The train consists of 9 coaches:

- 1 Second Sitting
- 7 General Unreserved
- 2 Seating cum Luggage Rake

== Traction ==
Both trains are hauled by a Santragachi Loco Shed-based WAM-4 electric locomotive from Kharagpur to Purulia and vice versa.

== Rake sharing ==
The train shares its rake with 12865/12866 Lalmati Express and 22821/22822 Birsa Munda Express.

== See also ==
- Kharagpur Junction railway station
- Purulia Junction railway station
- Lalmati Express
- Birsa Munda Express
