= Jallianwalla Bagh Express =

Train in India

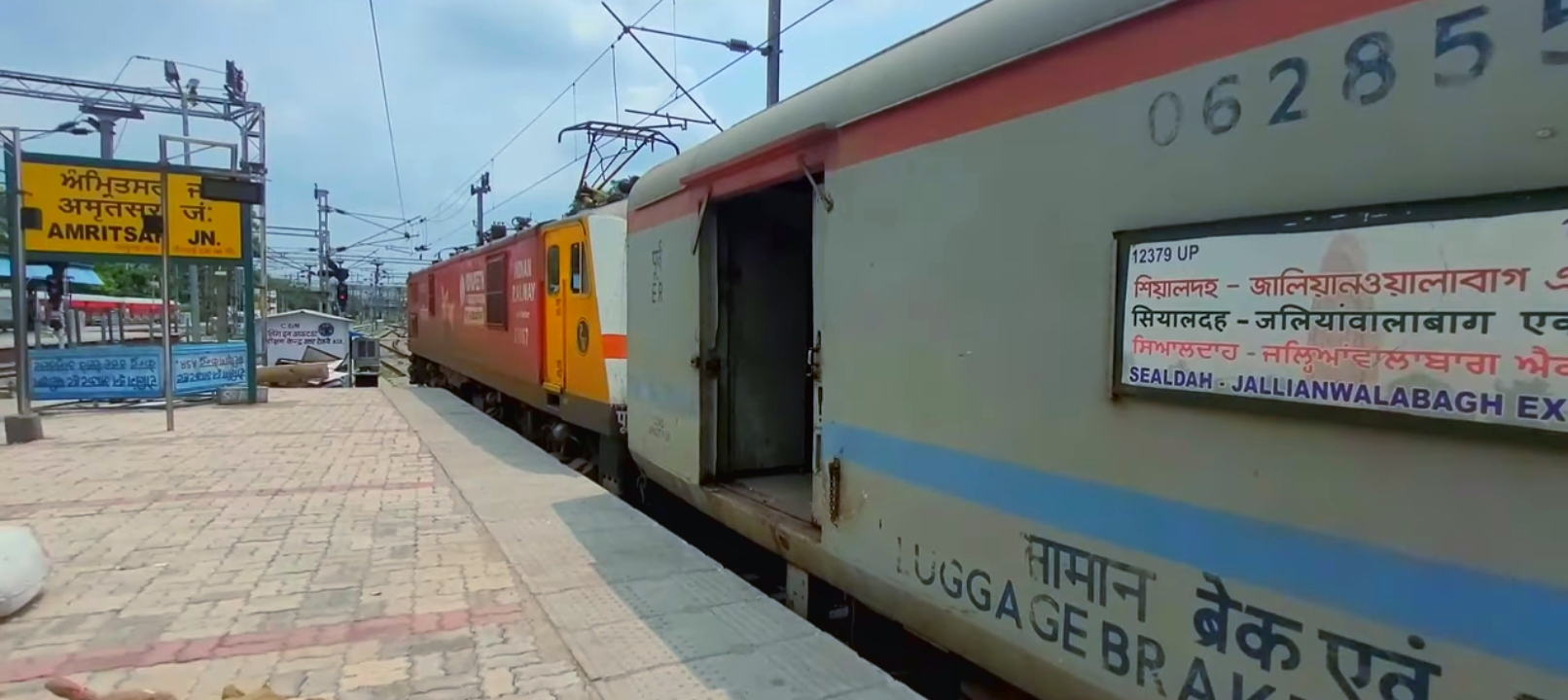
- Jallianwalla Bagh Express At Amritsar Junction railway station

Overview
- Service type: Express
- First service: 30 December 2009; 16 years ago
- Current operator: Eastern Railway

Route
- Termini: Sealdah (SDAH); Amritsar (ASR)
- Stops: 14
- Distance travelled: 1,901 km (1,181 mi)
- Average journey time: 27 hours 10 minutes
- Service frequency: Weekly
- Train number: 12379 / 12380

On-board services
- Classes: AC First Class, AC 2 Tier, AC 3 Tier, Sleeper Class, General Unreserved
- Seating arrangements: Yes
- Sleeping arrangements: Yes
- Catering facilities: Available
- Observation facilities: Large windows
- Baggage facilities: Available
- Other facilities: Below the seats

Technical
- Rolling stock: LHB coach
- Track gauge: 1,676 mm (5 ft 6 in)
- Operating speed: 70 km/h (43 mph) average including halts.

The 12379 / 12380 Jallianwalla Bagh Express is an express train of the Indian Railways connecting Sealdah in West Bengal and Amritsar Junction of Punjab. It is currently being operated with 12379/12380 train numbers on Friday of a week.

== Service ==
The 12379 Jallianwala Bagh Express has an average speed of 62 km/h and covers 1901 km in 30 hrs 35 mins. 12380 Jallianwala Bagh Express has an average speed of 62 km/h and covers 1901 km in 30 hrs 35 mins.

== Route and halts ==
| Station Code | Station Name | Arrival | Departure |
|---|---|---|---|
| SDAH | Sealdah | --- | 13:10 |
| BWN | Barddhaman Junction | 14:39 | 14:41 |
| DGR | Durgapur | 15:25 | 15:27 |
| ASN | Asansol Junction | 16:02 | 16:07 |
| KMME | Kumardubi | 16:30 | 16:31 |
| DHN | Dhanbad Junction | 17:10 | 17:15 |
| KQR | Koderma Junction | 18:30 | 18:32 |
| GAYA | Gaya Junction | 20:00 | 20:05 |
| SSM | Sasaram Junction | 21:03 | 21:05 |
| DDU | Pt DD Upadhyaya Junction | 22:25 | 22:35 |
| CNB | Kanpur Central | 03:10 | 03:15 |
| DLI | Old Delhi Junction | 09:05 | 09:15 |
| UMB | Ambala Cantt Junction | 11:50 | 11:55 |
| LDH | Ludhiana Junction | 13:20 | 13:30 |
| JUC | Jalandhar City Junction | 14:30 | 14:35 |
| BEAS | Beas Junction | 15:03 | 15:05 |
| ASR | Amritsar Junction | 15:50 | --- |

== Coach composition ==
The train has standard LHB rakes with max speed of 120 kmph. The train consists of 22 coaches:

- 1 AC First-class
- 1 AC II Tier
- 3 AC III Tier
- 11 Sleeper coaches
- 1 Pantry car
- 3 General
- 2 EOGs

== Traction ==
Both trains are hauled by a Howrah Loco Shed-based WAP-7 or WAP-4 electric locomotive from Sealdah to Amritsar and vice versa.

== Rake sharing ==
The train shares its rake with 12329/12330 West Bengal Sampark Kranti.

== See also ==
- Sealdah railway station
- Amritsar Junction railway station
- West Bengal Sampark Kranti
- Tatanagar–Amritsar Jallianwalla Bagh Express
