= West Bengal Sampark Kranti Express =

Train in India

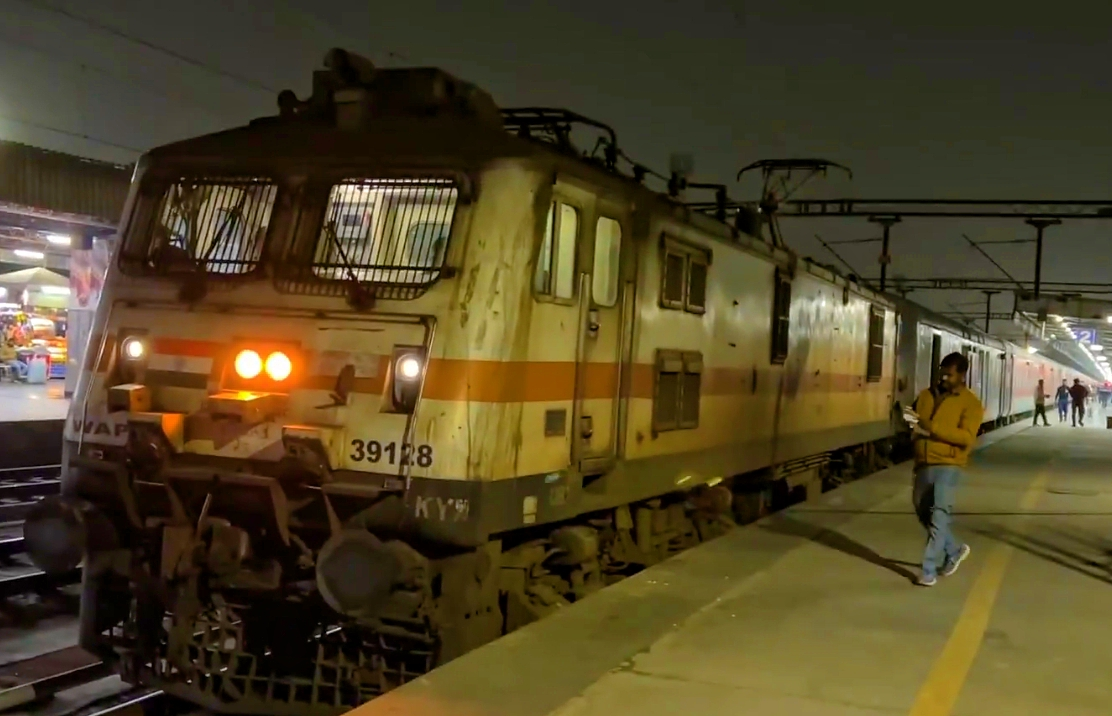
- West Bengal Sampark Kranti Express Arrived At Prayagraj Junction railway station

Overview
- Service type: Sampark Kranti Express
- Locale: West Bengal, Jharkhand, Bihar, Uttar Pradesh & Delhi
- First service: 11 March 2005; 20 years ago
- Current operator: Eastern Railway

Route
- Termini: Sealdah (SDAH); Anand Vihar Terminal (ANVT)
- Stops: 9
- Distance travelled: 1,445 km (898 mi)
- Average journey time: 19 hours 40 minutes
- Service frequency: Weekly
- Train number: 12329 / 12330

On-board services
- Classes: AC first, AC 2 tier, AC 3 tier, Sleeper class, General Unreserved
- Seating arrangements: Yes
- Sleeping arrangements: Yes
- Catering facilities: Available
- Observation facilities: Large windows
- Baggage facilities: Available

Technical
- Rolling stock: LHB coach
- Track gauge: 1,676 mm (5 ft 6 in)
- Operating speed: 73 km/h (45 mph) average including halts.
Route map
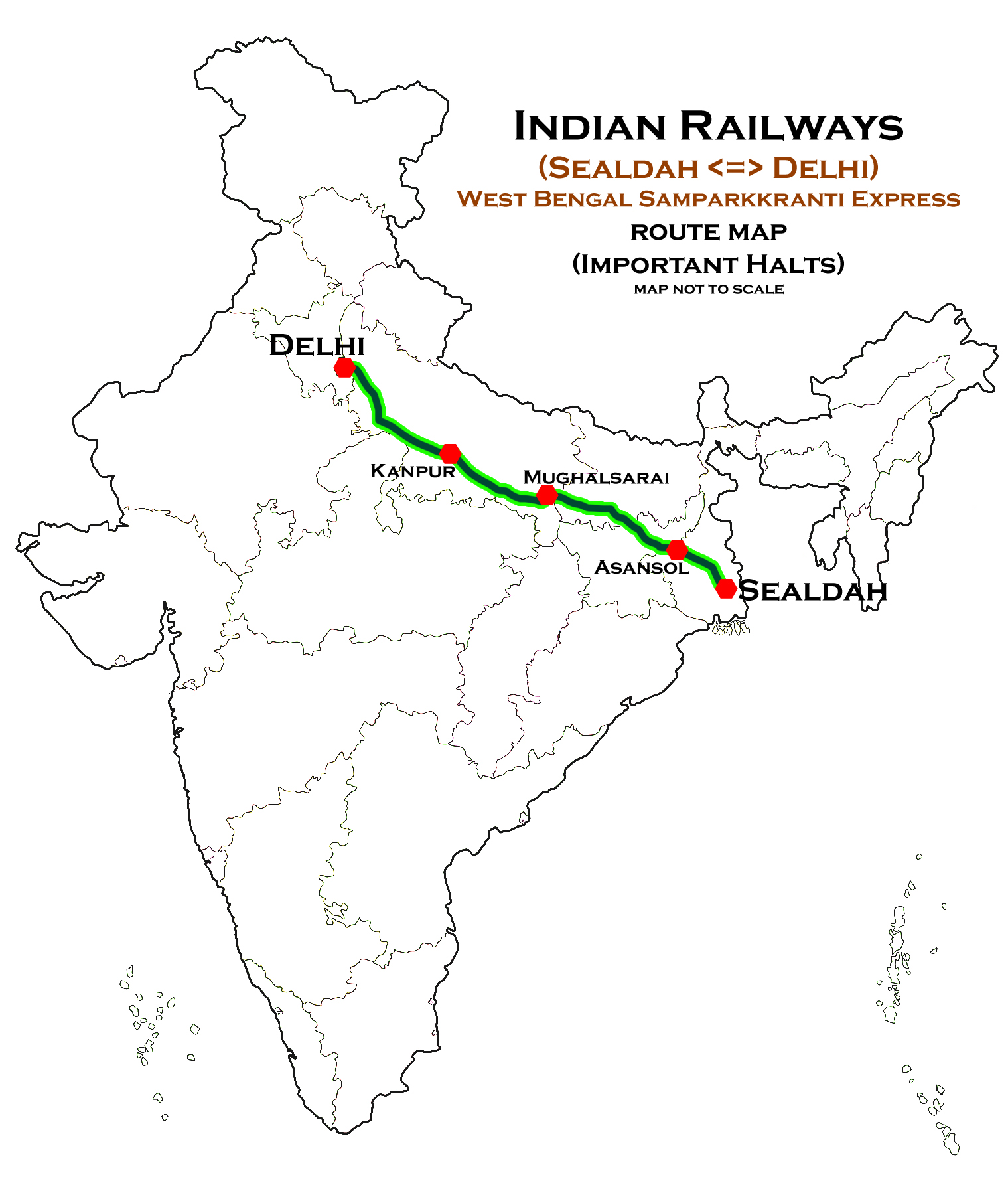
- West Bengal Sampark Kranti Express route map

The 12329 / 12330 West Bengal Sampark Kranti Express is the Sampark Kranti Express category train which connects Sealdah in Kolkata and Anand Vihar Terminal in Delhi, India. This train was first announced during the budget session on 2004–05 of Indian Railways by then the Minister of Railways, Nitish Kumar. It was officially inaugurated on 11 March 2005 from Sealdah and on 12 March 2005 from Delhi.

== Schedule ==
West Bengal Sampark Kranti runs once a week. It departs from Sealdah at 13:10 hrs on Tuesday and arrives on its subsequent day at Anand Vihar Terminal at 08:40 hrs. On its return journey, it departs from Anand Vihar Terminal at 19:10 and arrives at Sealdah at 17:30 hrs.

In its journey, it passes through Indian states of West Bengal, Jharkhand, Bihar, Uttar Pradesh and Delhi. Enroute, the train covers 1447 km of journey in 19 hrs 40 min, at an average speed of 74 km/h.

== Route & halts ==
Station code	Station name	Arrival	Departure
SDAH	Sealdah	---	13:10
BWN	Barddhaman Junction	14:37	14:39
DGR	Durgapur	15:23	15:27
ASN	Asansol Junction	16:02	16:07
DHN	Dhanbad Junction	17:10	17:15
GAYA	Gaya Junction	20:05	20:10
DDU	Pt DD Upadhyaya Junction	22:25	22:35
CNB	Kanpur Central	03:10	03:15
ANVT	Anand Vihar Terminal	08:40	---

== Rake and composition ==
The West Bengal Sampark Kranti Express runs with the modern LHB coach since 28 February 2017. It carries one AC First cum AC Two tier, one AC Two Tier, three AC Three Tier, eleven Sleeper class, three General/Unreserved class, two Generator cum Luggage Vans and one pantry car.

The coach composition of West Bengal Sampark Kranti from Sealdah to Anand Vihar Terminal is:

Loco	1	2	3	4	5	6	7	8	9	10	11	12	13	14	15	16	17	18	19	20	21	22
	EOG	GEN	GEN	GEN	S1	S2	S3	S4	S5	S6	S7	S8	S9	PC	B1	B2	B3	B4	B5	A1	HA1	EOG

While on its return journey the rake reverses.

== Traction ==
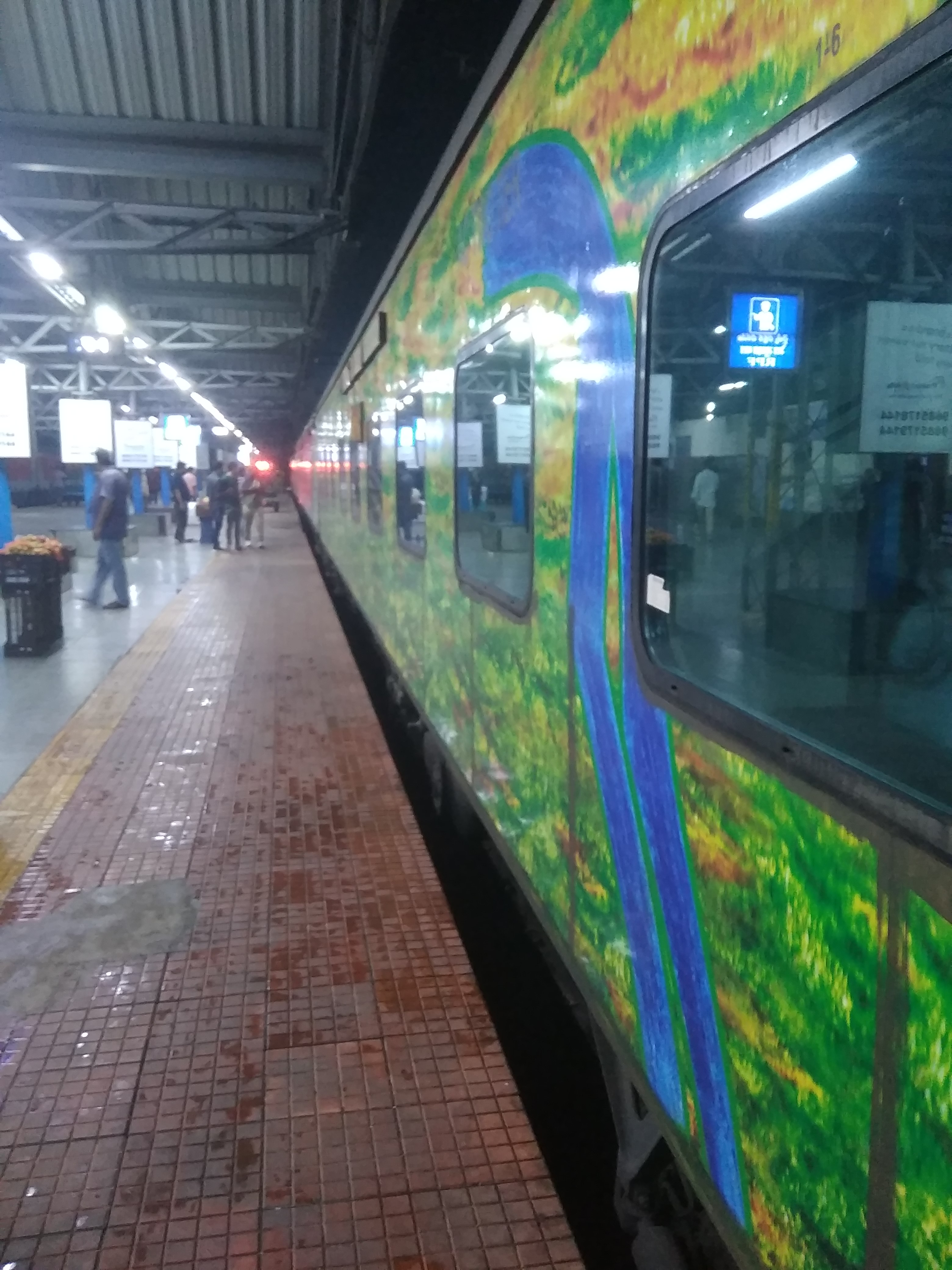
An AC Two Tier coach of West Bengal Sampark Kranti standing at Kanpur Railway Station

It is hauled by a Howrah-based WAP-7 or a Howrah-based WAP-4 locomotive throughout its entire journey.

== Other details ==
Earlier this train use to ply between Sealdah and Delhi Junction, but later in order to decongest Delhi Junction and New Delhi, this train was terminated to Anand Vihar Terminal from 3 October 2017. It shares its rake with the Sealdah–Amritsar Jallianwalla Bagh Express.

== Sources ==
- http://indiarailinfo.com/train/1692 India Rail Info
- http://indiarailinfo.com/train/1693 India Rail Info
- http://indiarailinfo.com/train/7845 India Rail Info
- http://indiarailinfo.com/train/7865 India Rail Info
