= Purulia–Villupuram Superfast Express =

Purulia–Tirunelveli Junction Superfast Express
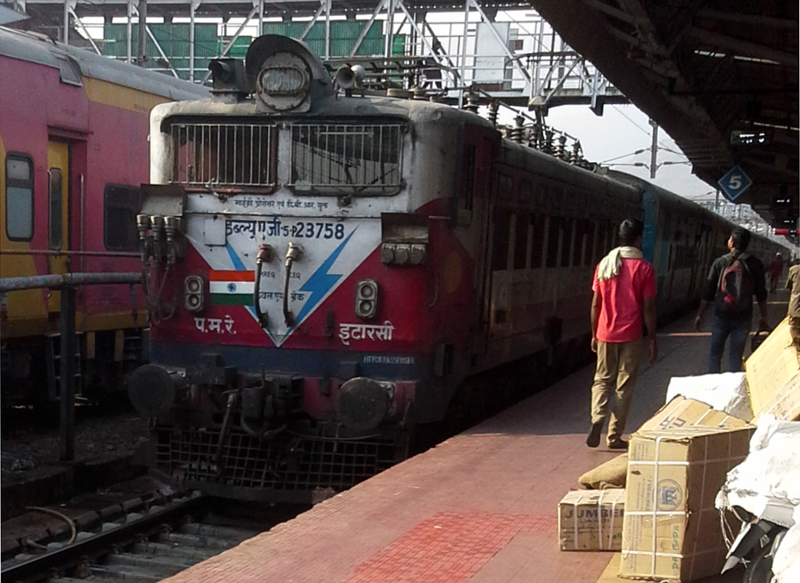
- Itarsi-based WAG-5 locomotive brings in Purulia to Viluppuram train into Visakhapatnam

Overview
- Service type: Superfast Express
- First service: 23 April 2012; 14 years ago
- Current operator: Southern Railway zone

Route
- Termini: Purulia Junction (PRR); Tirunelveli Junction (TEN)
- Stops: 35
- Distance travelled: 2,536 km (1,576 mi)
- Average journey time: 34h 45m
- Service frequency: Weekly (Note: Runs two days in a week for every direction.)
- Train number: 22605/22606

On-board services
- Classes: AC 2 tier, AC 3 tier, Sleeper class, General Unreserved
- Seating arrangements: No
- Sleeping arrangements: Yes
- Catering facilities: On-board catering E-catering
- Observation facilities: ICF Utkrisht rakes
- Entertainment facilities: No
- Baggage facilities: No
- Other facilities: Below the seats

Technical
- Rolling stock: 2
- Track gauge: 1,676 mm (5 ft 6 in)
- Operating speed: 57 km/h (35 mph), including halts
Route map
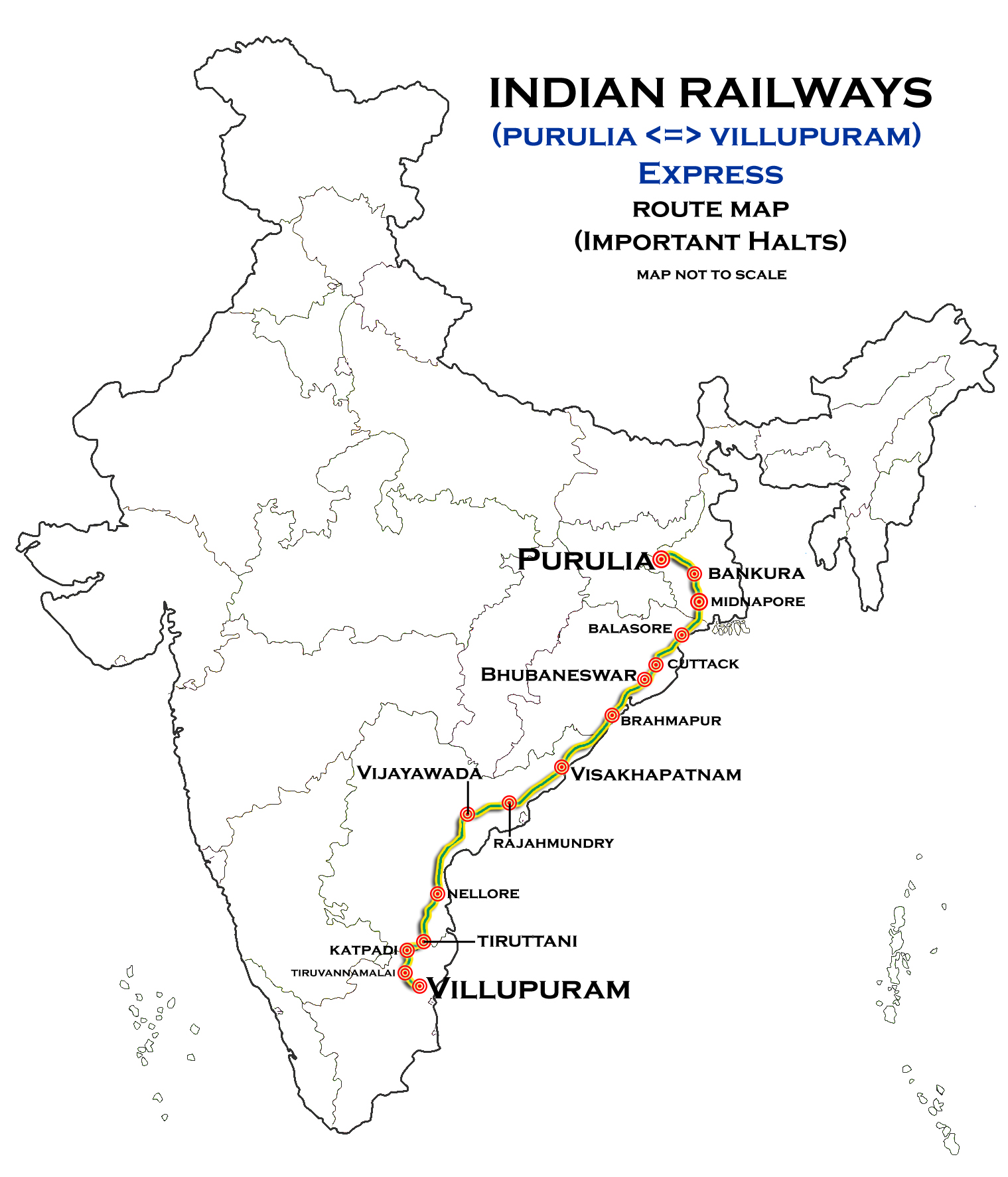

The Purulia–Tirunelveli Junction Superfast Express (previously Purulia-Villupuram Superfast Express) is an Superfast Express train belonging to Southern Railway zone that runs between Purulia Junction and Tirunelveli Junction in India. It is currently being operating with 22605/22606 train numbers on a weekly basis.

== Service ==
The 22605/Purulia–Viluppuram Weekly Superfast Express has an average speed of 57 km/h and covers 1992 km in 34h 15m. The 22606/Viluppuram–Purulia Weekly Superfast Express has an average speed of 56 km/h and covers 1992 km in 35h 30m .

== Route and halts ==
The important halts of the train are:

- Purulia
- Adra Junction
- Bankura Junction
- Cuttack Junction
- Bhubaneswar
- Khurda Road Junction
- Brahmapur
- Vizianagaram Junction
- Visakhapatnam Junction
- Eluru
- Vijayawada Junction
- Katpadi Junction
- Tiruvannamalai
- Viluppuram Junction

== Coach composition ==
The train has standard ICF rakes with a maximum speed of 110 km/h. The train consists of 18 coaches:

- 1 AC II Tier
- 2 AC III Tier
- 7 Sleeper coaches
- 6 General Unreserved
- 2 Seating cum Luggage Rake

== Traction ==
Both trains are hauled by an Erode Loco Shed-based WAP-7 electric locomotive from Purulia to Tirunelveli and vice versa.

== Rake sharing ==
The train shares its rake with 22603/22604 Kharagpur–Villupuram Superfast Express.

== Direction reversal ==
The train reverses its direction 1 times:

- Visakhapatnam Junction

== See also ==
- Purulia Junction railway station
- Viluppuram Junction railway station
- Kharagpur–Villupuram Superfast Express
