= Chakulia railway station =

Railway station in Jharkhand, India

Chakulia Railway Station

General information
- Location: Station Road, Chakulia, East Singhbhum district, Jharkhand; India
- Coordinates: 22.478422°N 86.721680°E
- Elevation: 126 m (413 ft)
- System: Passenger train station
- Owner: Indian Railways
- Operator: South Eastern Railway
- Line: Howrah–Nagpur–Mumbai line
- Platforms: 4

Construction
- Structure type: Standard (on ground station)

Other information
- Status: Functioning
- Station code: CKU
- Zone(s): South Eastern Railway zone
- Division(s): Kharagpur railway division

History
- Former names: Bengal Nagpur Railway
Location
- Location within India Location within Jharkhand

Chakulia Railway Station is a railway station on Howrah–Nagpur–Mumbai line under Kharagpur railway division of South Eastern Railway zone. It is situated at Chakulia in East Singhbhum district in the Indian state of Jharkhand. It is 29 km (18 mi) from Jhargram railway station and 67 km (42 mi) from Tatanagar Junction.
