= Purulia Junction railway station =

Railway Station in West Bengal, India

PURULIA JUNCTION পুরুলিয়া জংশন

- Purulia Junction Railway station

General information
- Location: Station Road, Purulia, West Bengal; India
- Coordinates: 23°19′30″N 86°22′41″E
- Elevation: 246 metres (807 ft)
- System: Indian Railways
- Owner: Indian Railways
- Operator: South Eastern Railway zone
- Lines: Asansol–Tatanagar–Kharagpur line, Purulia–Ranchi line and Purulia–Bokaro Steel City line
- Platforms: 4
- Tracks: 6

Construction
- Structure type: Standard on ground
- Parking: Available
- Cycle facilities: Available

Other information
- Status: Functional
- Station code: PRR
- Zone(s): South Eastern Railway zone
- Division(s): Adra
- Website: www.irctc.co.in/nget/train-search

History
- Opened: 1890; 136 years ago
- Electrified: 1961–62
- Former names: Bengal Nagpur Railway

Passengers
- Average 7533 per day.
Services
Preceding station	Indian Railways	Following station
Chharrah towards ?	South Eastern Railway zone Asansol–Tatanagar–Kharagpur line	Tamna towards ?
Terminus	South Eastern Railway zone Purulia–Ranchi line	Gourinathdham towards ?
Route map
Location
- Location within West Bengal Location within India
- Interactive map

Purulia railway station (station code:- PRR) serves Purulia City the headquarters of Purulia district in the Indian state of West Bengal. It is situated at the eastern side of the city with railway owned colonies which is home for working staffs. The station is under NSG3 category.

Purulia Junction railway station is presently a three-way junction point having direct connection to Asansol/Adra, Muri/Bokaro/Ranchi and Tatanagar/Chakradharpur.

12828 Howrah–Purulia Express is the most important and oldest train of the whole region that connects to Kolkata. 12884 Rupashi Bangla Express is another direct option running on the counter times of 12827/28.12801 Purushottam Express is the only daily link to New Delhi. 22605 Purulia–Villupuram Superfast Express is another important train connecting to Vellore that originates from here. 12152 Samarsata Express is the bi-weekly train to LTT-Mumbai. Totos (e-rickshaws) are available for local transport. Taxi and Maxi is available for long-distance travels from the station.

== Trains ==
- Bhubaneswar Rajdhani Express
- Santragachi–Anand Vihar Superfast Express
- Haldia–Anand Vihar Terminal Superfast Express
- Purushottam Express
- Samarsata Express
- Tatanagar–Amritsar Jallianwalla Bagh Express
- Shalimar–Gorakhpur Express
- Purulia–Anand Vihar Terminal Express
- Tatanagar–Thawe Express
- Tatanagar–Katihar Express
- Tatanagar–Buxar Express
- Tatanagar–Asansol Express
- South Bihar Express
- Bilaspur–Buxar SF Express
- New Tinsukia–Tambaram Express
- Nagaon Express
- Tambaram–Jasidih Weekly Superfast Express
- Porbandar–Santragachi Kavi Guru Express
- Swarnarekha Express
- Howrah–Purulia Express
- Rupashi Bangla Express
- Purulia–Villupuram Superfast Express
- Howrah–Ranchi Intercity Express (via Tatanagar)
- Ranchi–Howrah Vande Bharat Express

== History ==
The Bengal Nagpur Railway was formed in 1887 for the purpose of upgrading the Nagpur Chhattisgarh Railway and then extending it via Bilaspur to Asansol, in order to develop a shorter Howrah–Mumbai route than the one via Allahabad. The Bengal Nagpur Railway main line from Nagpur to Asansol, on the Howrah–Delhi main line, was opened for goods traffic on 1 February 1891.

The Purulia–Ranchi line was opened as a narrow-gauge railway of BNR in 1907. The Ranchi–Kotshila section was upgraded to broad gauge in 1960 and the Kotshila–Purulia section subsequently.

== Electrification ==
The Purulia–Chakradharpur, Kandra–Gomharria, Sini–Adityapur, Adityapur–Tatanagar, Chakradharpur–Manoharpur and Manoharpur–Rourkela sections were electrified in 1961–62.
