= Ghatsila railway station =

Railway Station in Jharkhand

Ghatsila
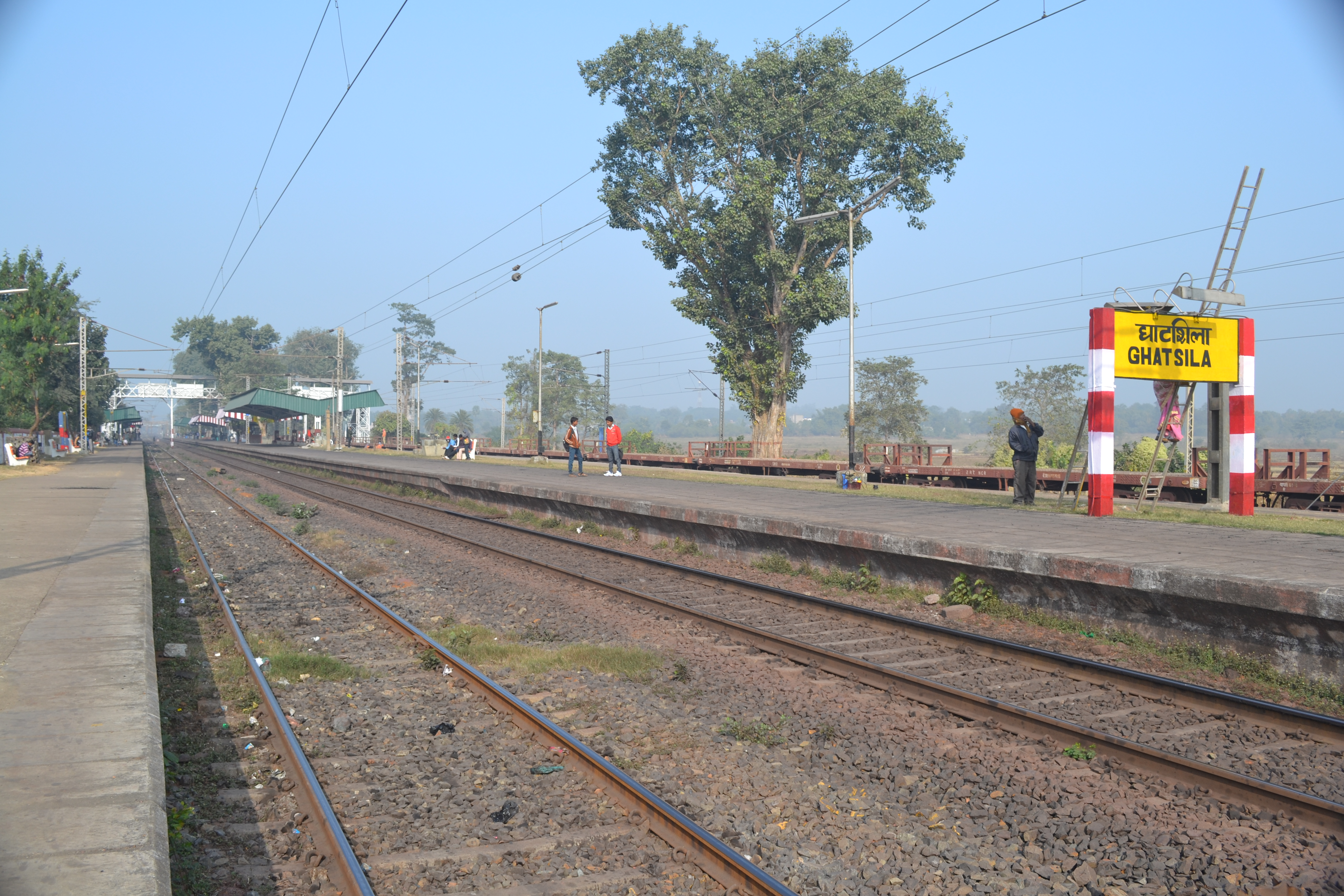

General information
- Location: Station Road, Ghatshila, East Singhbhum district, Jharkhand; India
- Coordinates: 22.586216°N 86.479044°E
- Elevation: 105 m (344 ft)
- System: Passenger train station
- Owner: Indian Railways
- Operator: South Eastern Railway
- Line: Howrah–Nagpur–Mumbai line
- Platforms: 7

Construction
- Structure type: Standard (on ground station)

Other information
- Status: Functioning
- Station code: GTS
- Zone(s): South Eastern Railway zone
- Division(s): Kharagpur railway division

History
- Former names: Bengal Nagpur Railway
Location
- Location within India Location within Jharkhand

Ghatsila Railway Station is a railway station on Howrah–Nagpur–Mumbai line under Kharagpur railway division of South Eastern Railway zone. It is situated at Ghatsila in East Singhbhum district in the Indian state of Jharkhand. It is 36 km (22 mi) from Tatanagar Junction.
