= Jhargram railway station =

Railway Station in West Bengal

Jhargram ঝাড়গ্রাম

General information
- Location: Jhargram, Jhargram district, West Bengal; India
- Coordinates: 22.454400°N 86.998292°E
- Elevation: 82 m (269 ft)
- System: Express train and Passenger train station
- Owner: Indian Railways
- Operator: South Eastern Railway
- Line: Howrah–Nagpur–Mumbai line
- Platforms: 6

Construction
- Structure type: At grade

Other information
- Status: Functioning
- Station code: JGM
- Zone(s): South Eastern Railway
- Division(s): Kharagpur

History
- Former names: Bengal Nagpur Railway
Location
- Location within India Location within West Bengal

Jhargram railway station is a railway station on Howrah–Nagpur–Mumbai line under Kharagpur railway division of South Eastern Railway zone. It is situated at Jhargram in Jhargram district in the Indian state of West Bengal. It is 40 km (25 mi) from Kharagpur Junction and 96 km (60 mi) from Tatanagar Junction.
