= Tulin, Purulia =

Tulin
- Village
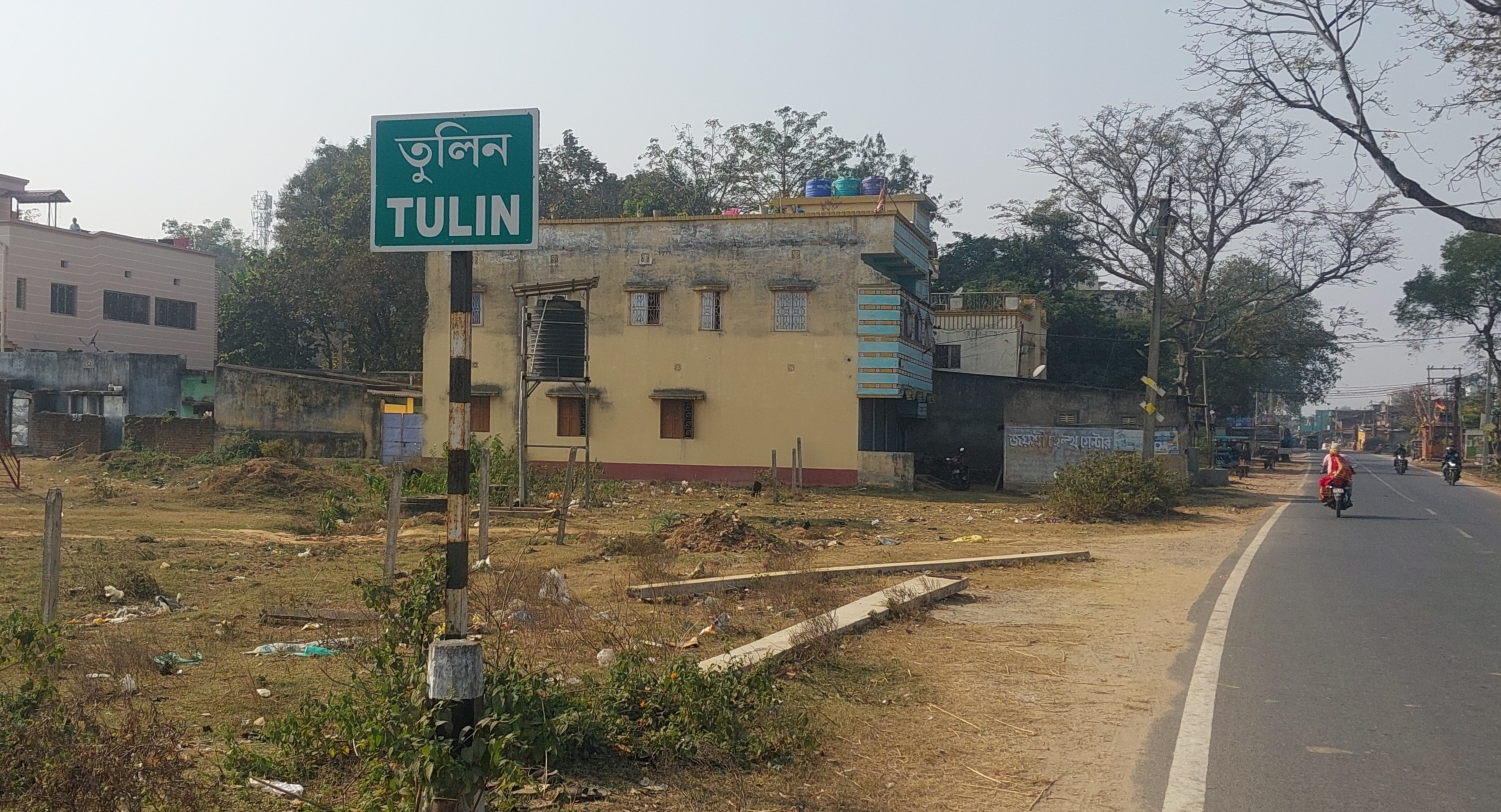

- at the border of west Bengal, Location in West Bengal, India Tulin (India)
- Coordinates: 23.3794°N 85.8906°E
- Country: India
- State: West Bengal
- District: Purulia

Government
  - Type: Panchayet

Area
  - Total: 761.94 km^{2} (294.19 sq mi)
- Elevation: 264 m (866 ft)

Population
  - Total: 9,844
  - Density: 12.92/km^{2} (33.46/sq mi)

Bengali, Kurmali, local hindi
  - Official: Bengali, English
- Time zone: UTC+5:30 (IST)
- ISO 3166 code: IN-WB
- Website: purulia.gov.in
- Places in Jhalda subdivision in Purulia district. Key: M: municipality, C: census town, R: rural/ urban centre, H: historical/ religious centre, X: craft centre, T: tourist centre, △: hills Owing to space constraints in the small map, the locations in the larger map on click through may vary slightly.

Tulin is a village and a gram panchayat in the Jhalda I CD block in the Jhalda subdivision of the Purulia district in the state of West Bengal, situated beside the Subarnarekha River.

== Geography ==
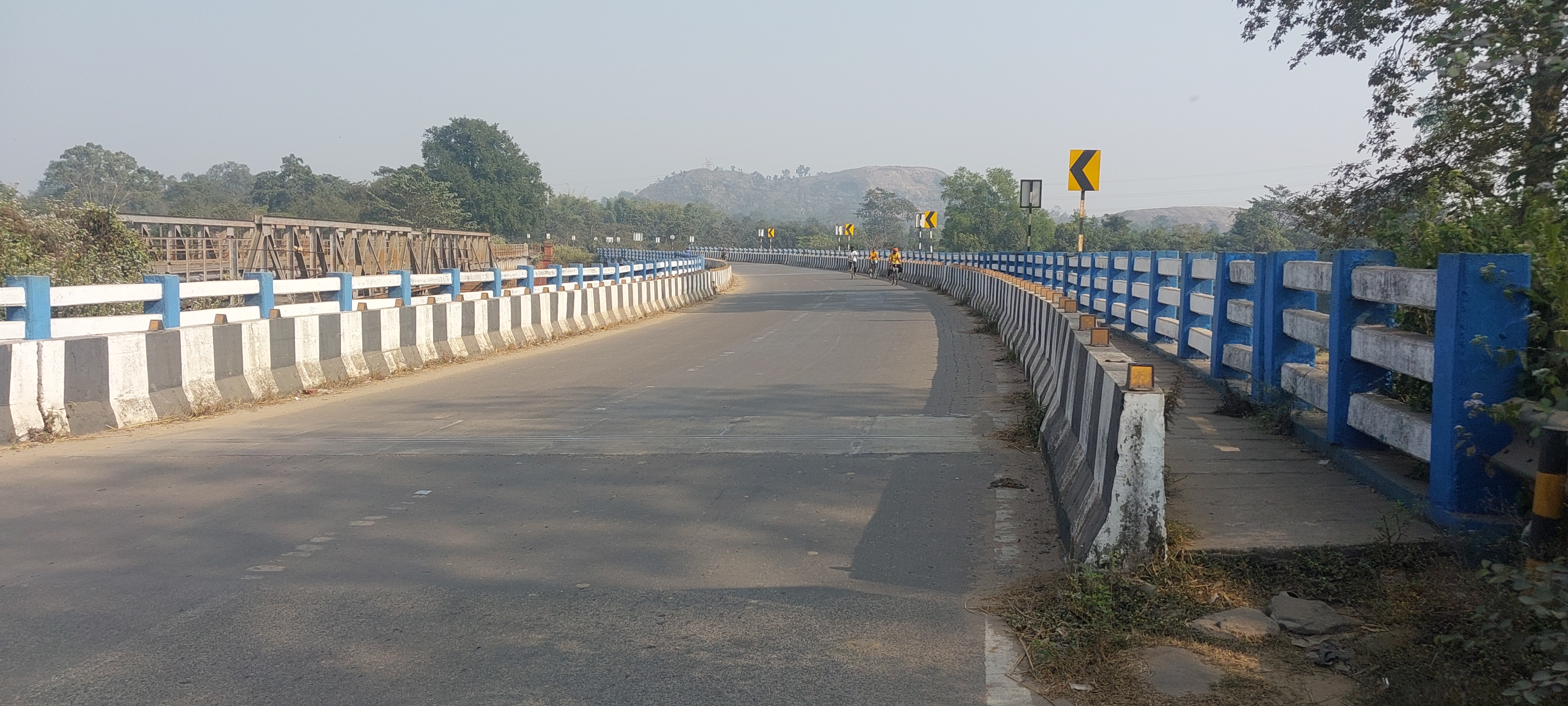
Tulin Bridge on Subarnarekha River

=== Location ===
Tulin is a developed village, located in the border of West Bengal and Jharkhand. According to Census 2011 information the location code of Tulin village is 331279. It is situated 11.6 km (7.2 mi) away from sub-division Jhalda and 54.8 km (34.1 mi) away from district headquarters at Purulia. The total geographical area of village is 761.94 hectares (1,882.8 acres).

=== Area overview ===
Purulia district forms the lowest step of the Chota Nagpur Plateau. The general scenario is undulating land with scattered hills. Jhalda subdivision, shown in the map alongside, is located in the western part of the district, bordering Jharkhand. The Subarnarekha flows along a short stretch of its western border. It is an overwhelmingly rural subdivision with 91.02% of the population living in the rural areas and 8.98% living in the urban areas. There are 3 census towns in the subdivision. The map alongside shows some of the tourist attractions in the Ajodhya Hills. The area is home to Purulia Chhau dance with spectacular masks made at Charida. The remnants of old temples and deities are found in the subdivision also, as in other parts of the district.

== Demographics ==
According to the 2011 Census of India, Tulin had a total population of 9,844 of which 5,054 (51%) were males and 4,790 (49%) were females. There were 1,222 persons in the age range of 0 to 6 years. The total number of literate people in Tulin was 6,602 (76.57% of the population over 6 years).

== Transport ==
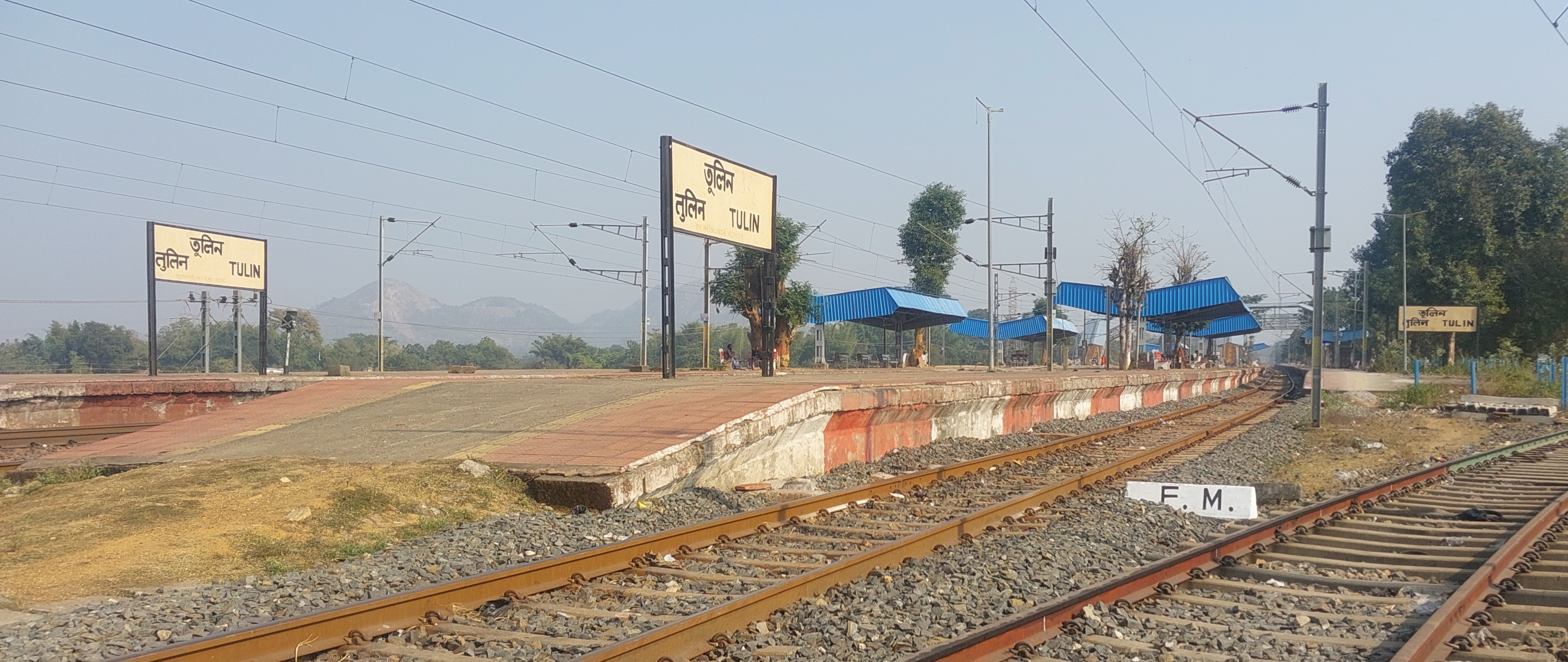
Tulin railway station

Tulin is the originating/ terminating point of the State Highway 4A running to Chas Morh.

Tulin railway station situated on the NSC Bose Gomoh-Hatia line of the South Eastern Railway.
