= Murraburru Hill =

Hill in West Bengal

- Pakhi Pahar
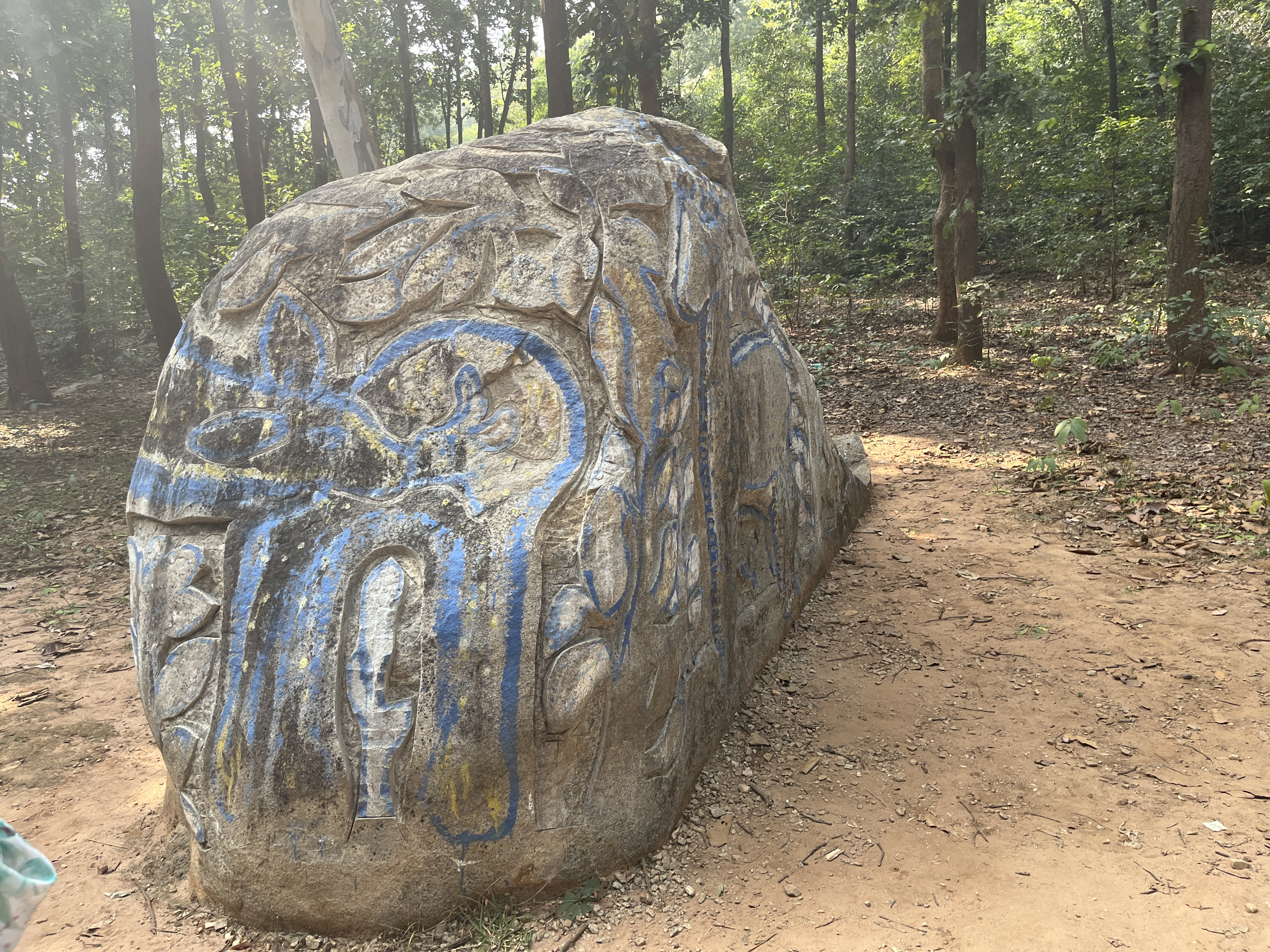
- Rock cut art, Pakhi Pahar

Highest point
- Listing: Hills of West Bengal
- Coordinates: 23°07′10″N 86°06′15″E

Geography
- Location within West Bengal Location within India
- Murraburru Hill (red) with places in Purulia district. Key: M: municipality, C: census town, R: rural/ urban centre, H: historical/ religious centre, X: craft centre, T: tourist centre, △: hills Owing to space constraints in the small map, the locations in the larger map on click through may vary slightly.
- Location: Purulia district, West Bengal, India
- Parent range: Chhotanagpur Plateau

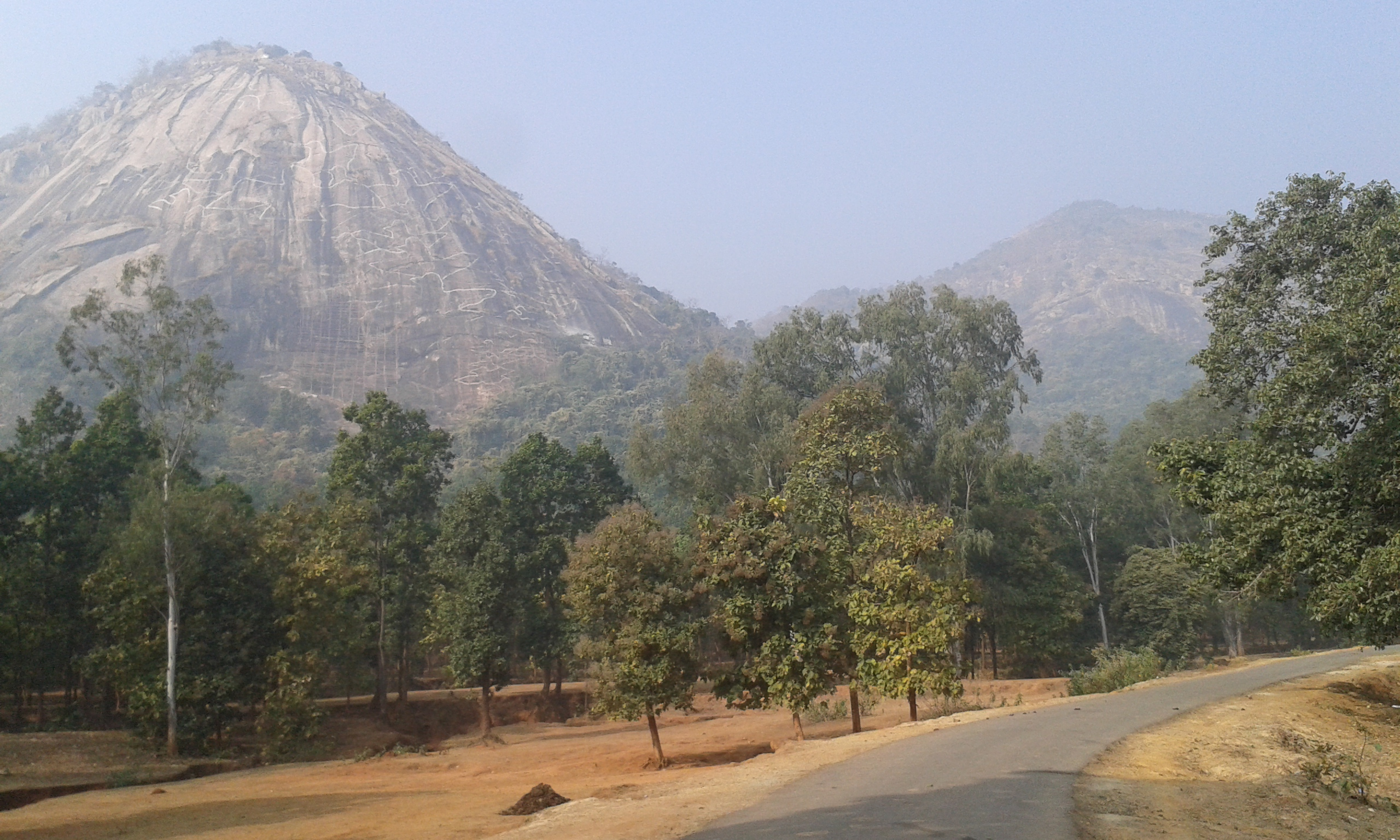
Murraburru Hill in Purulia district

Murraburru Hill popularly known as Pakhi Pahar is a hill located near Ajodhya Hills in Purulia district, West Bengal. Rock carvings done since 1995 have transformed the hill and nearby boulders.

== Description ==
The area is also known as the Pakhi Hills. The first carving was 800 ft (240 m) high by 600 ft (180 m) on the western face of Murraburru Hill and it now features many bird-shaped sculptures on the rocky surface of the hill. The artwork is visible from a considerable distance and it has become a landmark destination of Ayodhya Hills area contributing to tourism in the region.
