= Gorgaburu =

2nd highest peak in southern West Bengal, India

- গর্গাবুরু পাহাড়
- Location within West Bengal Location within India
- Places in Jhalda subdivision in Purulia district. Key: M: municipality, C: census town, R: rural/ urban centre, H: historical/ religious centre, X: craft centre, T: tourist centre, △: hills Owing to space constraints in the small map, the locations in the larger map on click through may vary slightly.

Highest point
- Elevation: 677 m (2,221 ft)
- Listing: Hills of West Bengal
- Coordinates: 23°08′37.3″N 86°07′42.8″E

Geography
- Location: Purulia district, West Bengal, India
- Parent range: Ajodhya Hills

Gorgaburu is the second highest peak of the Ajodhya Hills with a height of 677 metres (2,221 feet). It is the second highest point in southern part of West Bengal. It is located at Western plateau and highlands of Purulia district.

It is a conical hill formed out of the granite and gneiss of the hills.
