= Purulia Pumped Storage Power Station =

Purulia Pumped Storage Project
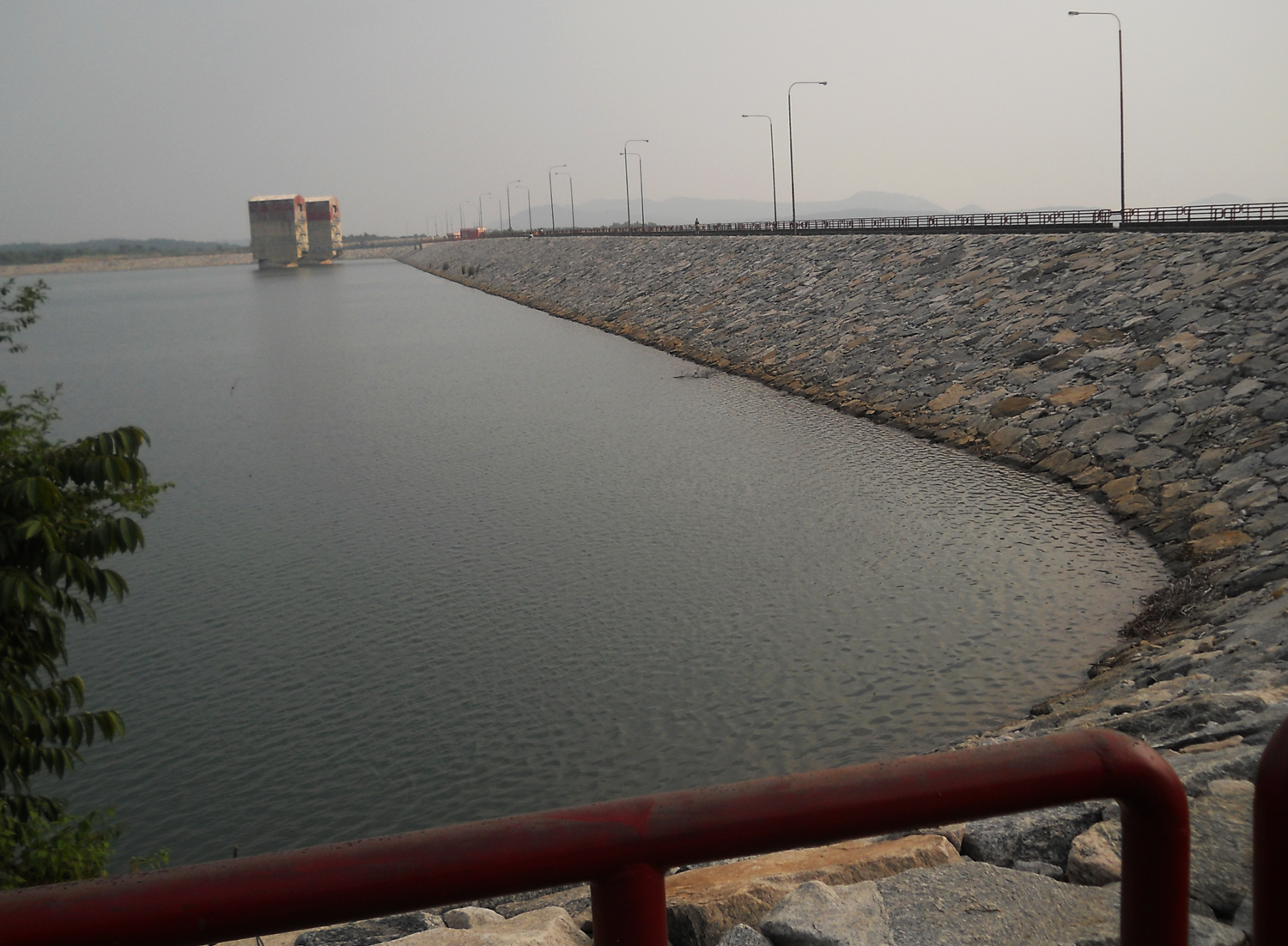
- Upper reservoir of Purulia Pumped Storage Project

- Location within West Bengal
- Country: India
- Location: Baghmundi, Purulia district, West Bengal
- Coordinates: 23°11′53″N 86°05′55.5″E
- Purpose: Power
- Status: Operational
- Construction began: 2002; 24 years ago
- Opening date: 2008; 18 years ago
- Construction cost: Estimated ₹2,500 crore (equivalent to ₹36 billion or US$370 million in 2023)
- Owner: West Bengal State Electricity Distribution Company

Upper dam and spillways
- Type of dam: Rock-fill dam
- Height: 65 m
- Length: 800 m (2,600 ft)

Upper reservoir
- Total capacity: 13,300 acre⋅ft (16,400,000 m^{3})
- Active capacity: 10,840 acre⋅ft (13,370,000 m^{3})
- Maximum water depth: 22 m
- Normal elevation: Low 494 m - High 516 m

Lower dam and spillways
- Type of dam: Rock-fill dam
- Height: 95 m
- Length: 310 m

Lower reservoir
- Total capacity: 13,987 acre⋅ft (17,253,000 m^{3})
- Active capacity: 11,736 acre⋅ft (14,476,000 m^{3})
- Maximum water depth: 37 m
- Normal elevation: Low 300 m - High 337 m

Power Station
- Commission date: 2008; 18 years ago
- Type: Pumped-storage
- Hydraulic head: 177 m
- Pump-generators: 4 × 225-megawatt (302,000 hp) Francis pump-turbine
- Installed capacity: 900-megawatt (1,200,000 hp)
- Overall efficiency: 77.80%
- Storage capacity: 6 hours
- Website; WBSEDCL Purulia Pumped Storage Project (PPSP)

The Purulia Pumped Storage Project is a pumped storage hydroelectric power plant, located at Purulia district of West Bengal, India. The Ajodhya Hills offered suitable terrain for construction of upper and lower reservoirs. The scheme can supply a maximum power of 900-megawatt (1,200,000 hp).

== Construction ==
The project is constructed on Kistobazar nullah which is a tributary of Sobha nullah in Ajodhya Hills. The project was planned to be commissioned in 2002-03, but litigations during tender stage and difficulties in getting clearance for forested land caused delays to the project. Japan International Cooperation Agency (JICA) provided ₹2,272 crore (equivalent to ₹33 billion or US$340 million in 2023) of loan assistant for the project.

The local villagers protested against the project, as the villagers alleged massive loss of vegetation in the area and hundreds of villagers allegedly lost their livelihoods.

== Purpose ==
The objective of project is to meet load demand by producing power through the turbines at the peak load time and utilize surplus power available of the system during off peak time by pumping the water to upper reservoir, thus achieving the flatter load demand curve and maintaining the frequency.

It is operated not only to help meet the peak loads but also as a short term operating reserve (STOR), providing a fast response to short-term rapid changes in power demand, both hike and drop, or sudden loss of power generating stations. On 5 April, 2020 when people switched off their lights at 9 PM by request of Prime Minister Narendra Modi for solidarity in fight against COVID-19 pandemic, the West Bengal grid load was expected to dropped by 1 GW. While the national grid load was estimated to drop by 12 - 14 GW, far from the estimate the national grid power demand was dropped 31 GW in a span of 25 minutes. Out of 31,089 MW of power drop 17,543 MW of power was adjusted by hydro power facility across the country, While Purulia pumped storage adjusted about 700 MW of power drop by ramping down its generation to zero, Hydropower facility across the country played vital role for maintaining grid frequency.

Due to the increase in renewable power like solar and wind, the intermittency of power generation is increasing in India. Considering the future prospects another pumped storage projects at Turga (Purulia district, West Bengal) and Nilgiris (Tamil Nadu) are in planning phase.

== Capacity ==
The installed capacity is 900 MW (4*225 MW).

Unit Number	Date of Commissioning	Installed Capacity (MW)	Type	Status
1	31 January, 2008	225	Francis pump-turbine	Running
2	06 February, 2008	225	Francis pump-turbine	Running
3	12 November, 2007	225	Francis pump-turbine	Running
4	10 October, 2007	225	Francis pump-turbine	Running

== See also ==
- List of pumped-storage hydroelectric power stations
- List of energy storage projects
