= Jhalda railway station =

Railway station in West Bengal, India

JHALDA
- Indian Railways logo

General information
- Location: Jhalda, Purulia district, West Bengal; India
- Coordinates: 23°22′11″N 85°58′26″E
- Elevation: 297 metres (974 ft)
- System: Indian Railways station

Construction
- Parking: Available

Other information
- Status: Functional
- Station code: JAA
- Zone(s): South Eastern Railway
- Division(s): Ranchi Division

Services
| Preceding station | Indian Railways | Following station |
|---|---|---|
| Begunkodor towards Purulia Junction | South Eastern Railway zone Purulia–Muri line | Tulin towards Muri Junction |
Location
- Location within West Bengal Location within India
- Interactive map

Jhalda railway station, station code JAA, is the railway station serving the city of Jhalda which is in the Purulia district in the Indian state of West Bengal. Jhalda railway station belongs to the Ranchi division of the South Eastern Railway zone of the Indian Railways. Jhalda railway station is located between Muri and Bokaro Steel City.

== Facilities ==
The major facilities available are waiting rooms, retiring room, computerized reservation facility, reservation counter, and vehicle parking. The vehicles are allowed to enter the station premises. Security personnel from the Government Railway police (G.R.P) are present for security.

=== Platforms ===
The platforms are interconnected with foot overbridge (FOB).

== Trains ==
Several electrified local passenger trains also run from Jhalda to neighbouring destinations on frequent intervals.

== Nearest airports ==
The nearest airports to Jhalda Station are:

1. Birsa Munda Airport, Ranchi 74 kilometres (46 mi)
2. Gaya Airport, Gaya 207 kilometres (129 mi)
3. Lok Nayak Jayaprakash Airport, Patna 294 kilometres (183 mi)
4. Netaji Subhas Chandra Bose International Airport, Kolkata 297 kilometres (185 mi)

== See also ==
- Jhalda
