= Murguma Dam =

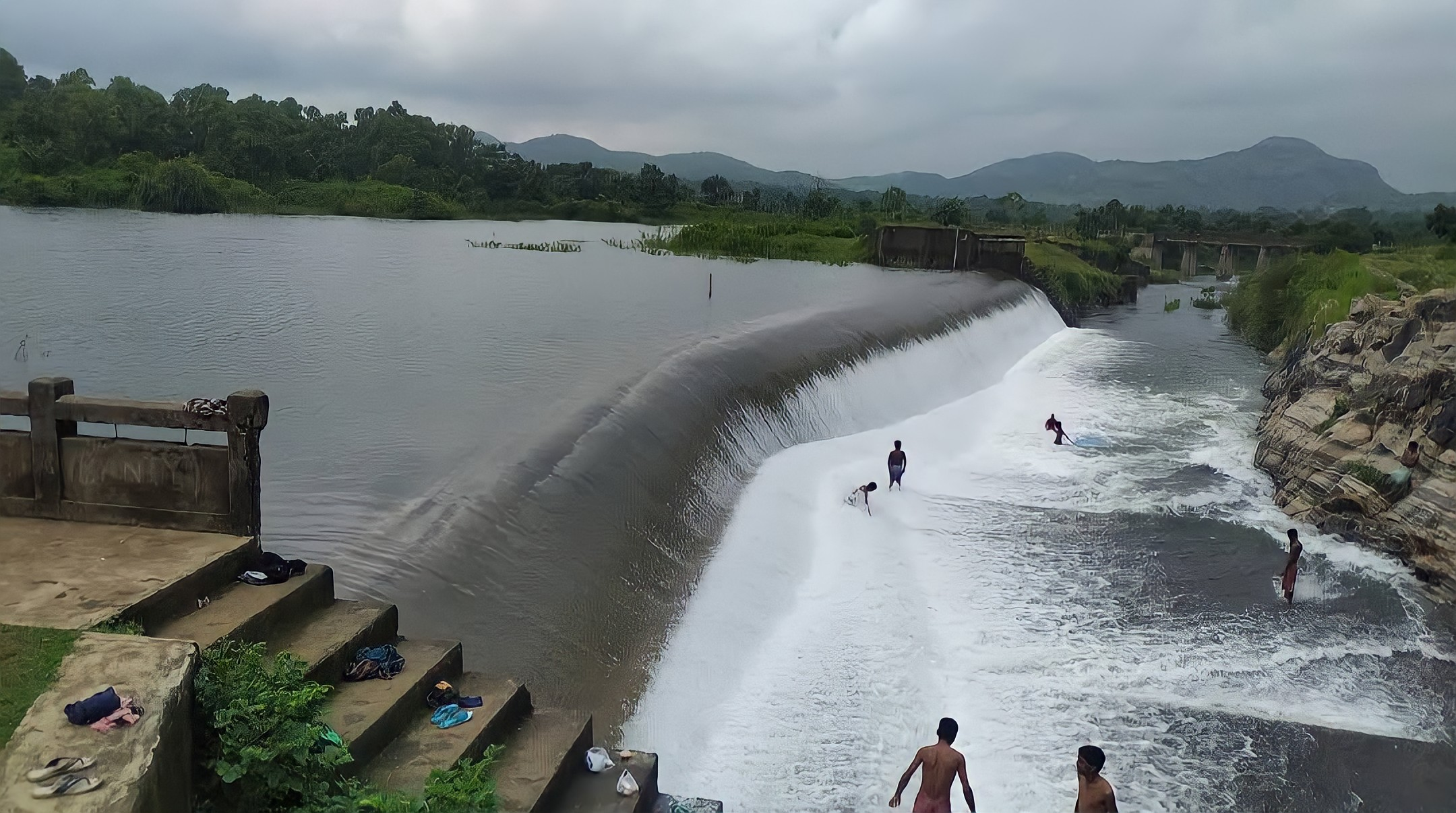
- Murguma Dam

- Location within West Bengal
- Location: Jhalda, Purulia District, West Bengal, India
- Coordinates: 23.314°N 86.050°E

Dam and spillways
- Impounds: Saharajhore River
- Website https://www.palashbitan.com/about-murguma.php
- Places in Jhalda subdivision in Purulia district. Key: M: municipality, C: census town, R: rural/ urban centre, H: historical/ religious centre, X: craft centre, T: tourist centre, △: hills Owing to space constraints in the small map, the locations in the larger map on click through may vary slightly.

The Murguma Dam is constructed on the Saharajhore River, a tributary of the Kangsabati River in West Bengal, India. The dam is constructed near Murguma, a village in the foothills of the Ajodhya Hills, Purulia District. The dam is situated at the north west end of Ajodhya Hills which is considered as an eastern extension of Chota Nagpur Plateau, resulting in the dam being surrounded by hills and forests. A number of other streams also flow into the dam directly from the Ajodhya Hills and the dam's lake contains a number of small islands.

== People and economy ==
The area is mainly inhabited by tribal people, with the Santal people predominant. The local economy is mainly dependent on agriculture. However, there is potential for tourism which might improve economic conditions for the local population so the government is promoting it as a tourist destination. This dam is one of the key small irrigation projects in rural, arid areas of West Bengal. While one of the promising tourist spots of Eastern Chota Nagpur Plateau region, to date, no facility of boating offered. The dam and surroundings are attractive locations for backpackers. The dam features in the tourism brochure of Government Tourist Department of Purulia District. The Murguma Dam area is also promoted as a tourist destination in the Ajodhya Hills region, with the reservoir and surrounding hills and forests attracting visitors interested in nature and scenic landscapes.

== Accessibility ==
The nearest railway station is Jhalda, from where it is accessible by single metalled road. The other option is to follow the Purulia-Tamna more-Arsha-Begunkodor-Murguma route for 50 km (31 mi). As the accessibility is not good this is perhaps one of the reasons that the locality still offers wild beauty.

Distance from nearby places: Ajodhya Hills Top = 20 km (12 mi) Jhalda = 16 km (9.9 mi) Begunkodor town = 6 km (3.7 mi) Begunkodar rail FH = 12 km (7.5 mi) Kolkata = 340 km (210 mi) Purulia = 50 km (31 mi) Durgapur = 185 km (115 mi)(via Bankura) 165 km (103 mi) (via Asansol), Bankura = 140 km (87 mi) Jamshedpur = 110 km (68 mi) Ranchi = 95 km (59 mi) Asansol = 134 km (83 mi)

== Miscellaneous ==
Being far from urban disturbance, this dam is a location for research on indigenous aquatic flora, and fauna. This area was affected by a Maoist insurgency in the past, and is under the jurisdiction of Kotshila Police Station.

== Gallery ==
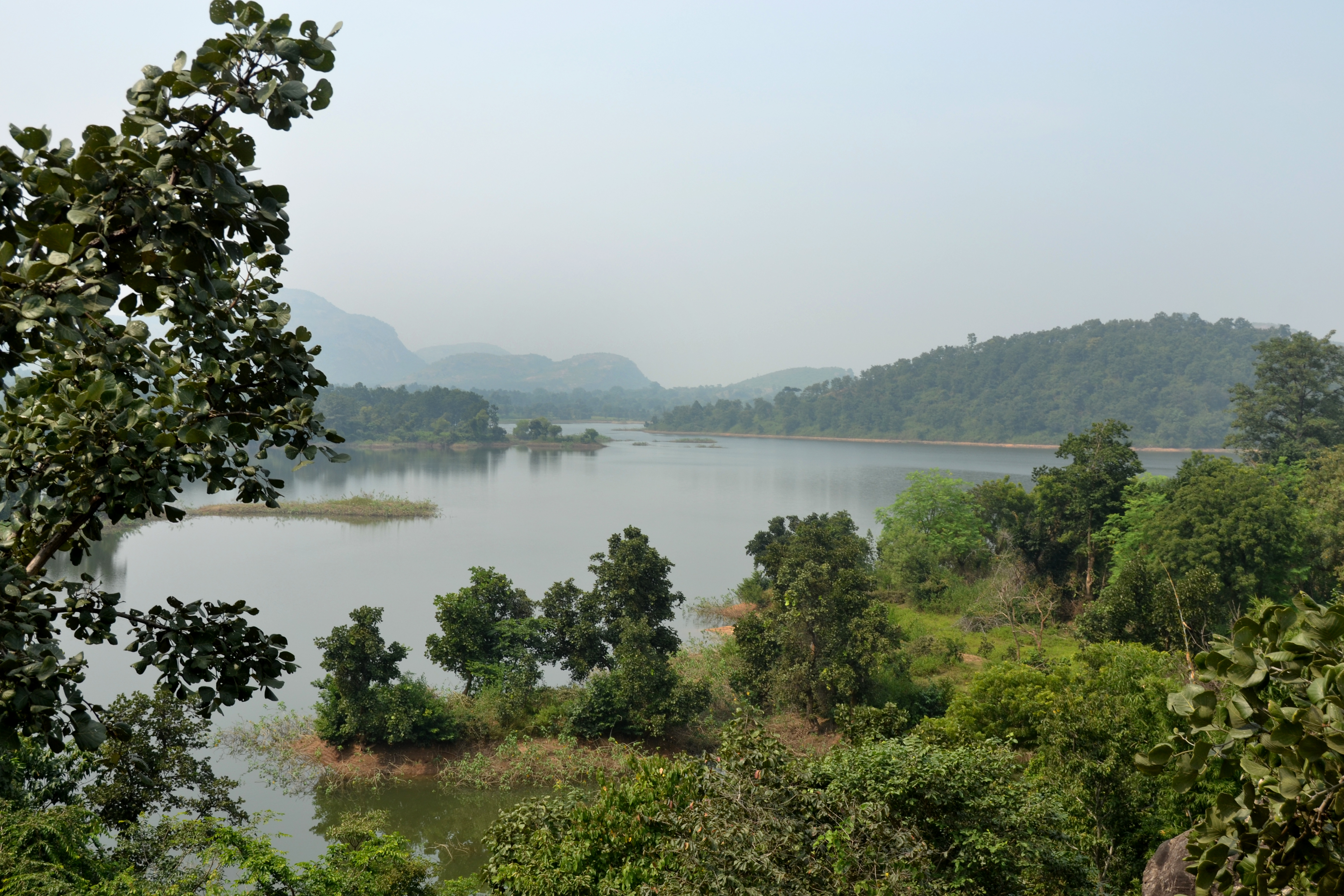
View from Ajodhya Hill

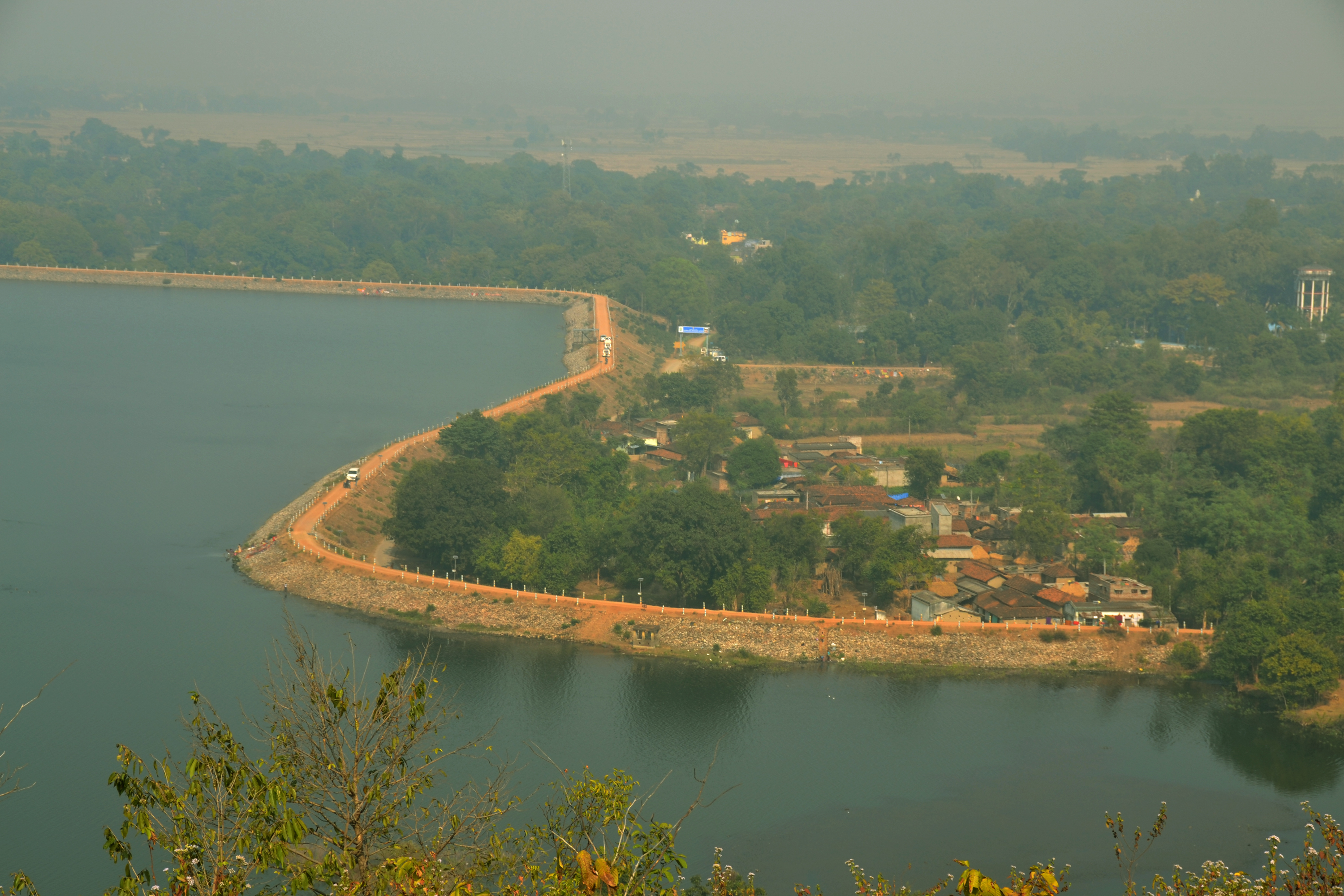
View of Murguma Dam and Murguma Village from Ajyodhya Hill View Point

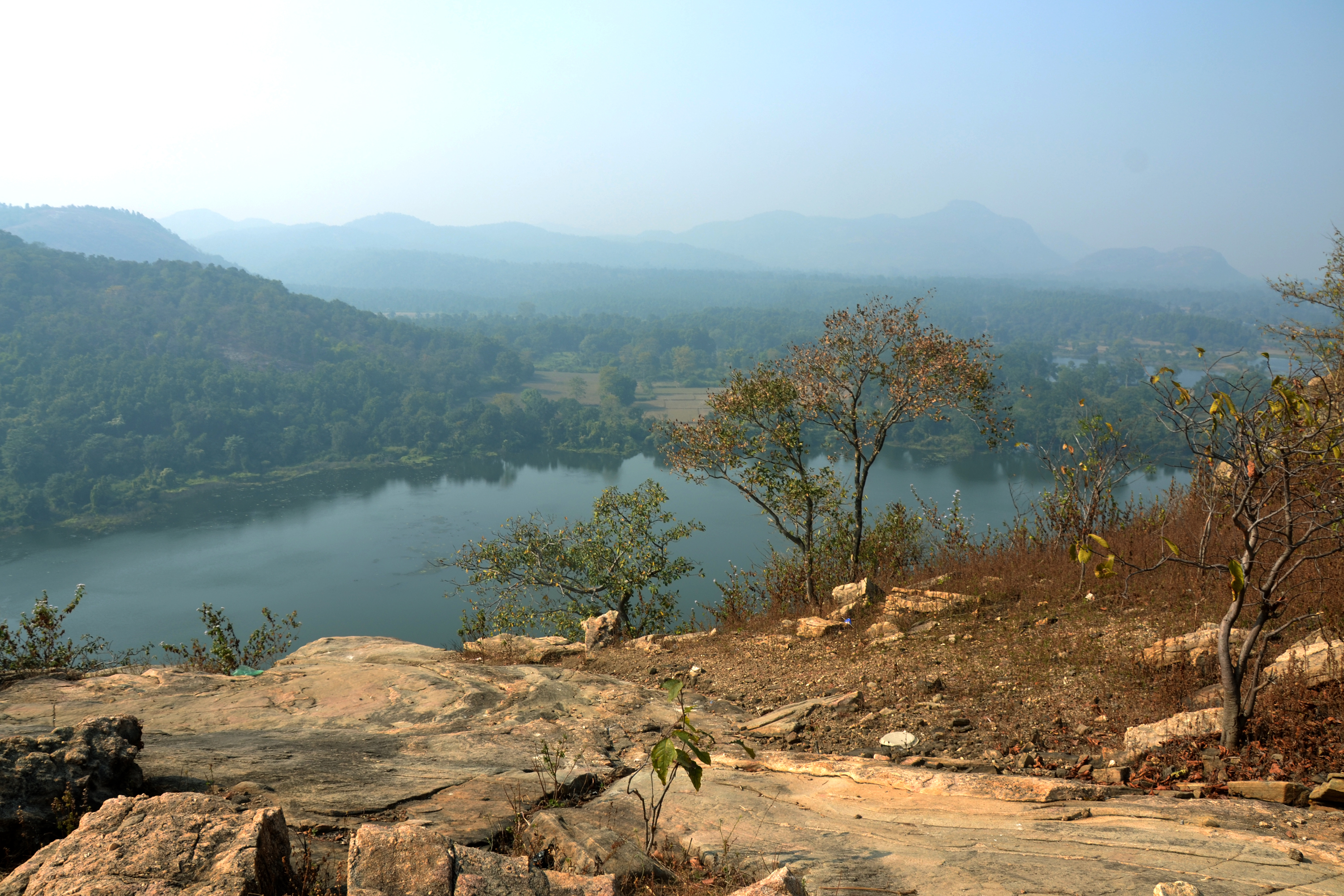
View of Murguma Dam and Murguma Village from Ajyodhya Hill View Point

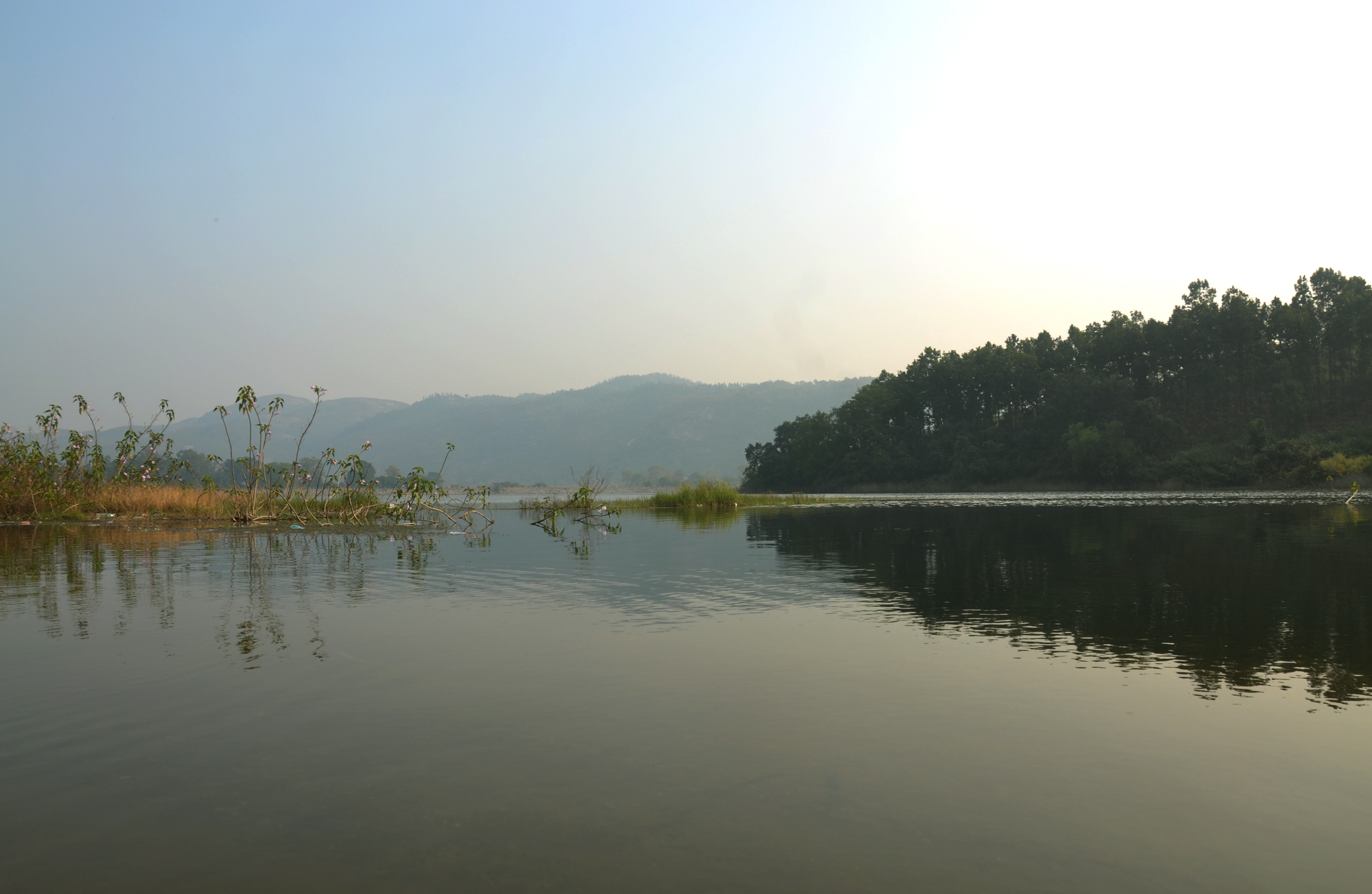
View of Murguma Dam

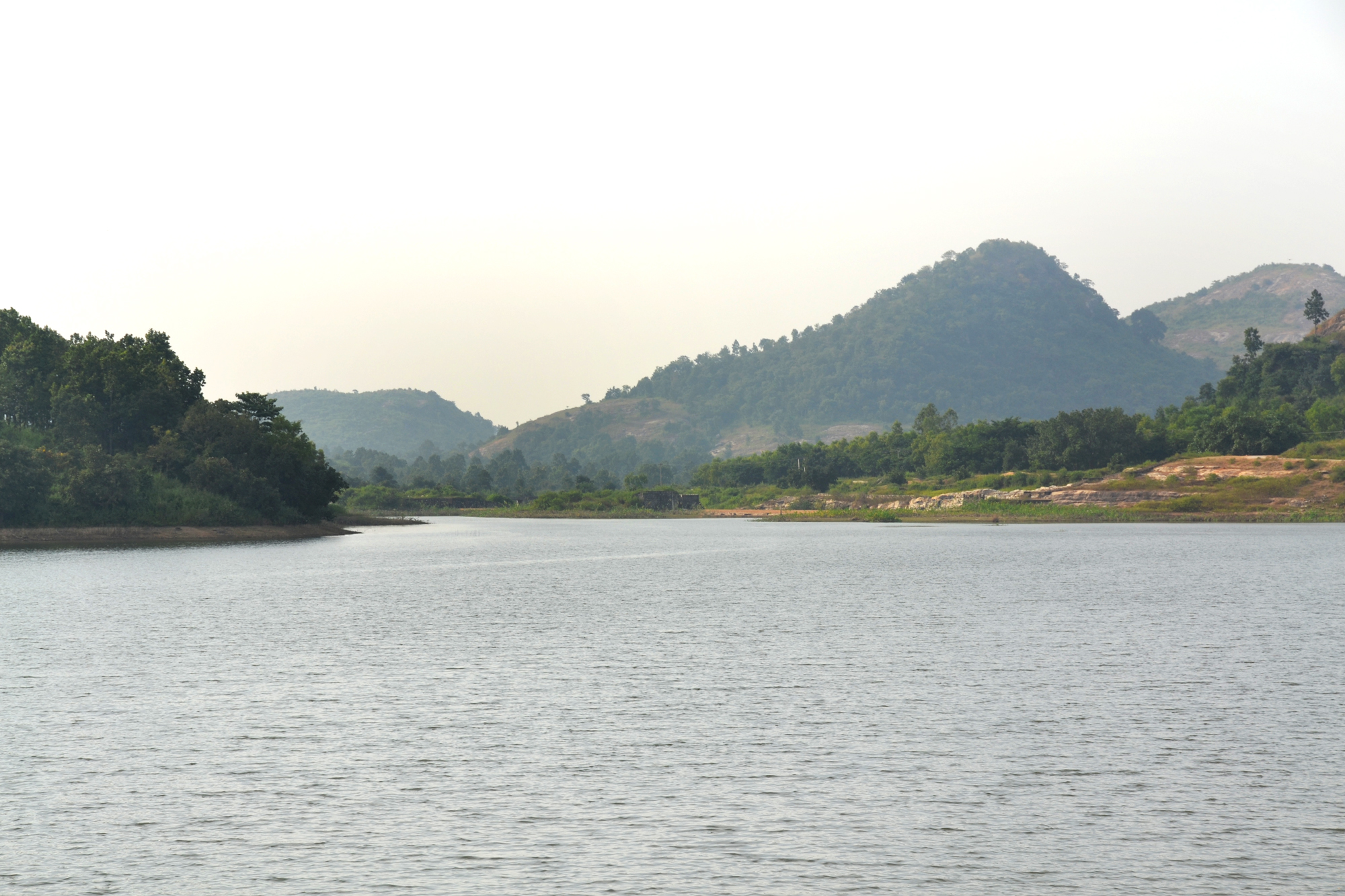
View from Dam Road

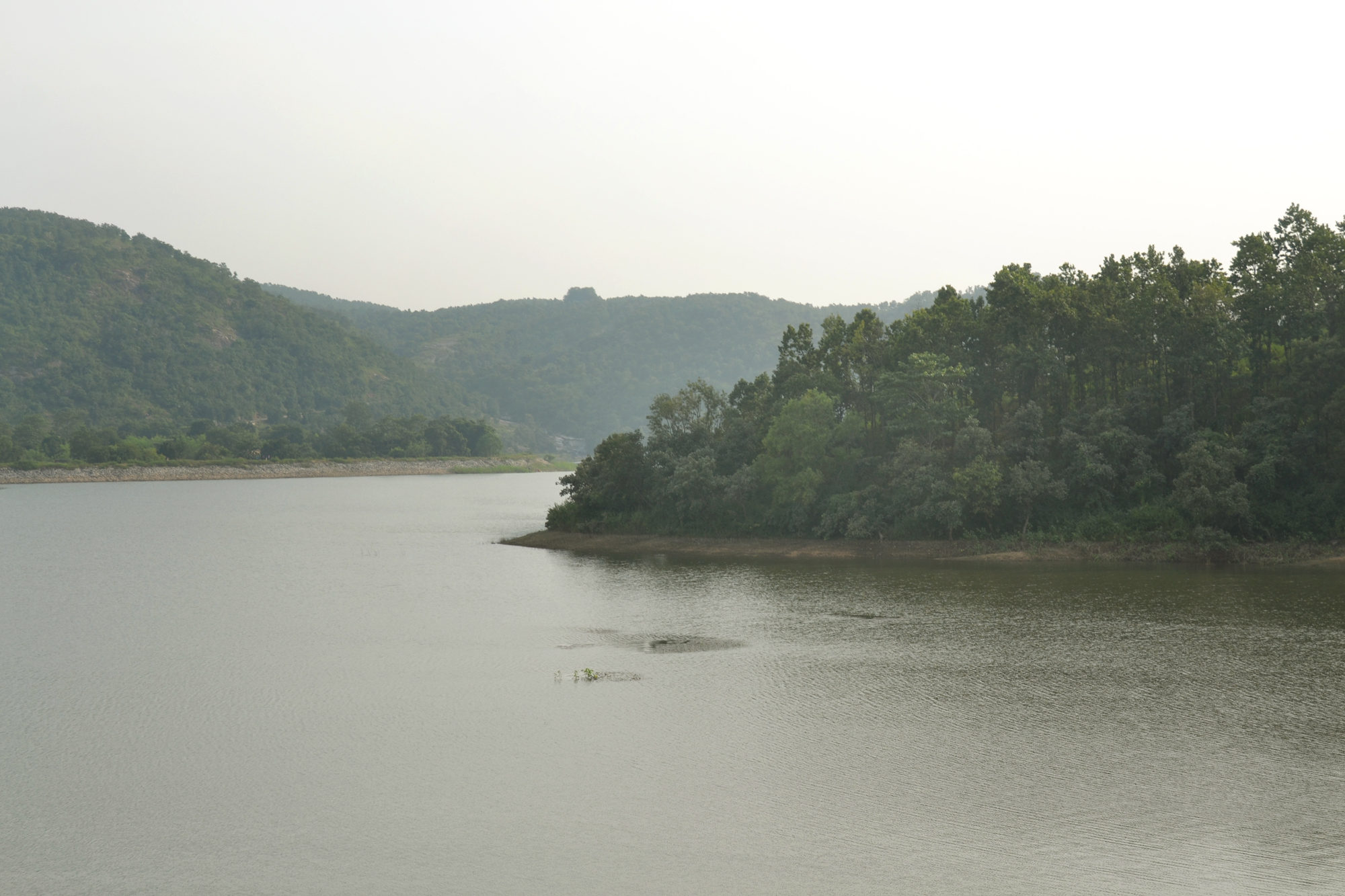
View from Sluice Gate

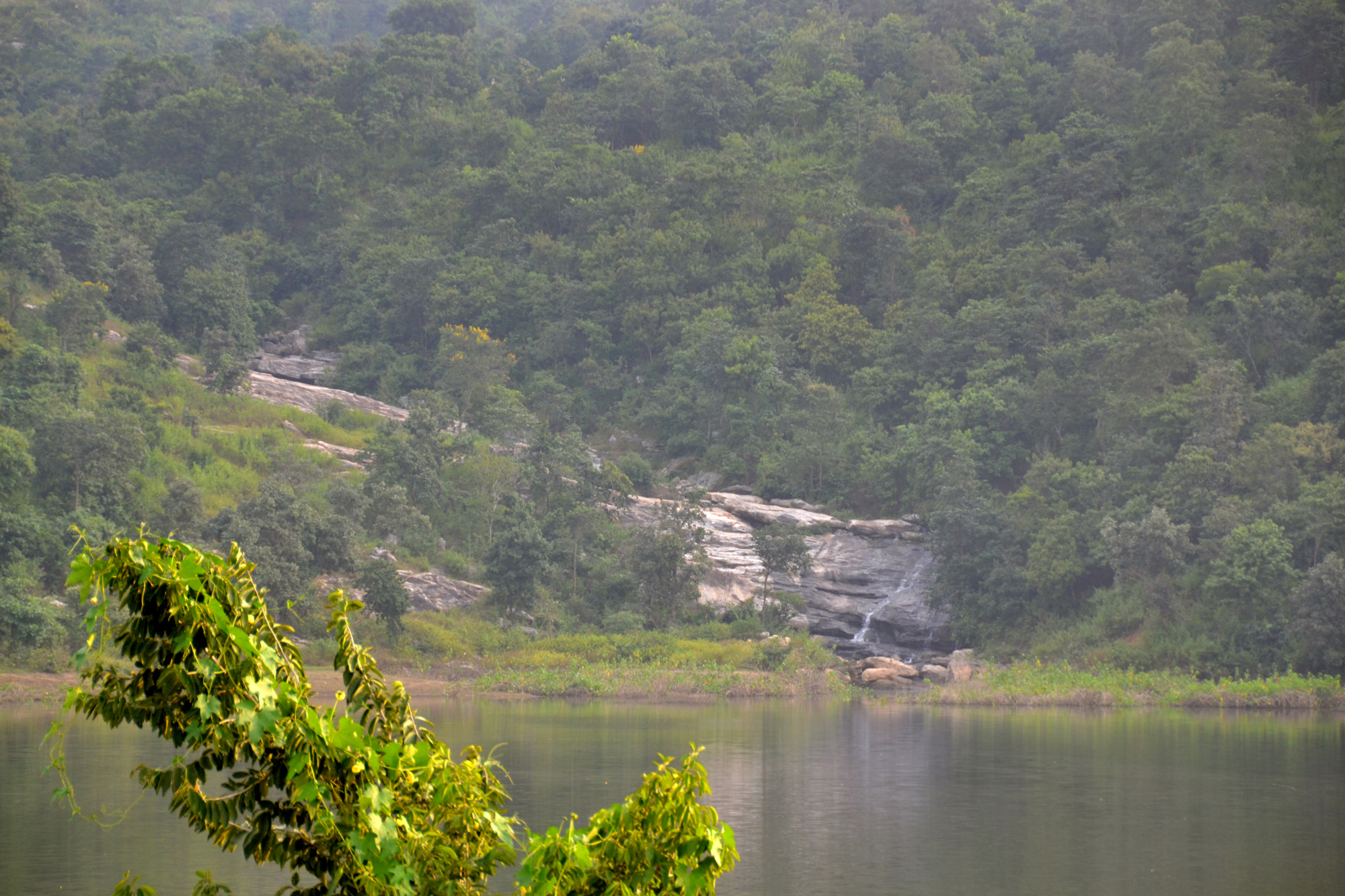
A stream coming from Ajodhya Hill

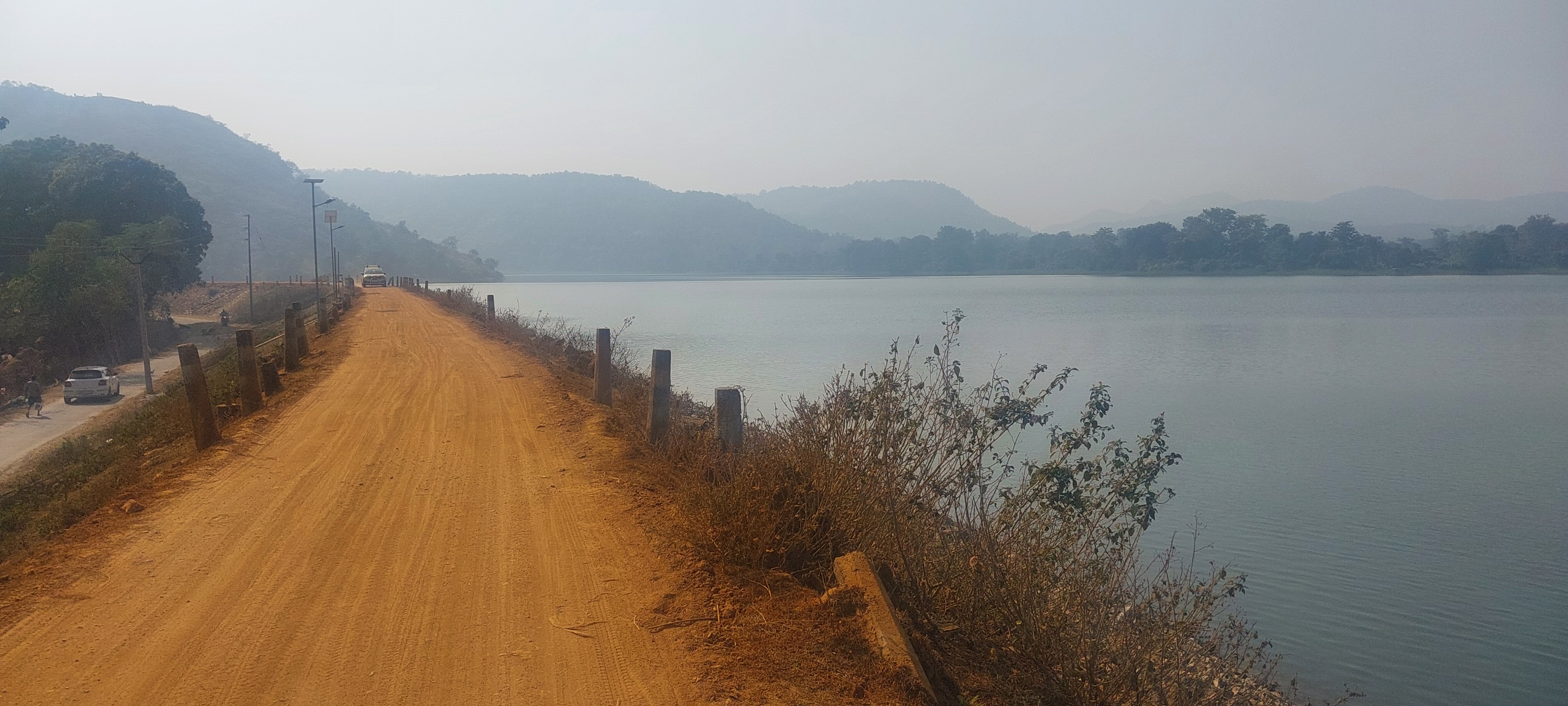
Murguma Dam and lake
