= Tulin railway station =

Railway station in West Bengal, India

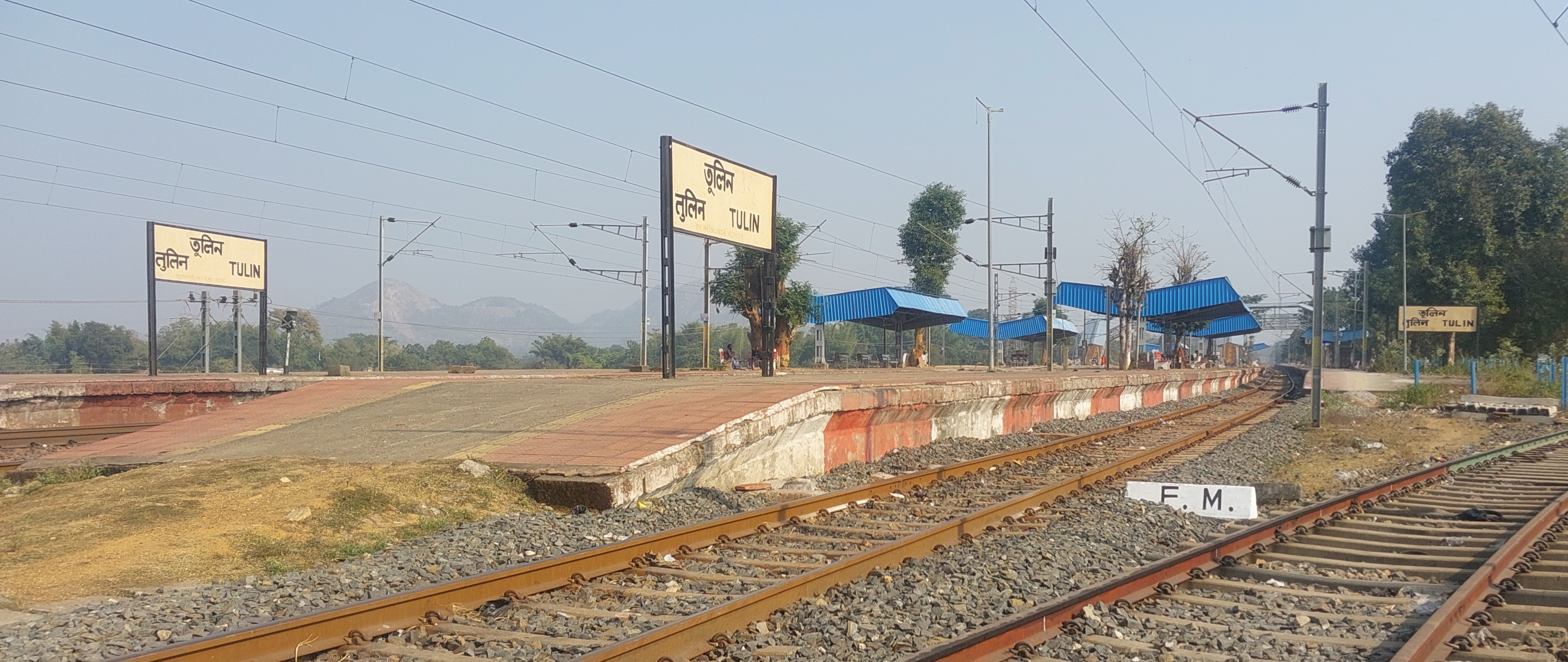
- Tulin railway station

General information
- Location: Ranchi road, (State Highway 2), Tulin, Purulia district, West Bengal; India
- Coordinates: 23.3786°N 85.9023°E
- Elevation: 266 metres (873 ft)
- System: Indian Railways station
- Line: Double electric line
- Platforms: 3
- Tracks: 2

Construction
- Parking: Not available

Other information
- Status: Functional
- Station code: THO
- Zone(s): South Eastern Railway
- Division(s): Ranchi

Services
Preceding station	Indian Railways	Following station
Jhalda towards Purulia Junction	South Eastern Railway zone Purulia–Muri line	Muri Junction Terminus
Location

Tulin railway station is an Indian railway station situated under Ranchi railway division of the South Eastern Railway zone of the Indian Railways. It is situated beside Ranchi road at Tulin in Purulia district in the Indian state of West Bengal. It serves Tulin and nearby villages. Total 16 trains stop in Tulin railway station.
