= Jhalda =

Jhalda Jhalida
- Town
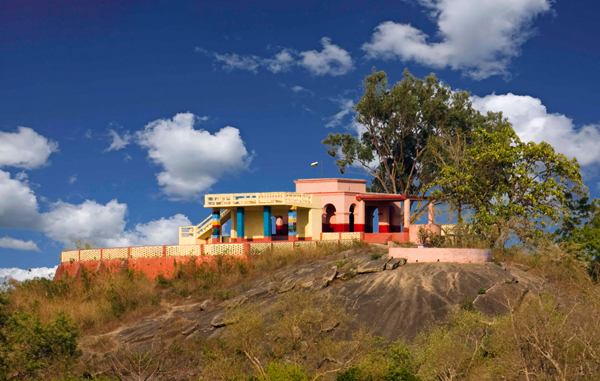
- Shilphore Hillock, Jhalda

- Location in West Bengal, India Jhalda (India)
- Coordinates: 23.37°N 85.97°E
- Country: India
- State: West Bengal
- District: Purulia

Government
  - Type: Municipality
  - Body: Jhalda Municipality

Area
  - Total: 3.85 km^{2} (1.49 sq mi)
- Elevation: 293 m (961 ft)

Population (2011)
  - Total: 19,544
  - Density: 5,080/km^{2} (13,100/sq mi)

Languages
  - Official: Bengali, Santali, Kurmali, English
- Time zone: UTC+5:30 (IST)
- PIN: 723202
- Telephone code: +91 3254
- Vehicle registration: WB 56
- Lok Sabha constituency: Purulia
- Vidhan Sabha constituency: Baghmundi, Joypur
- Website: www.jhaldamunicipality.com
- Places in Jhalda subdivision in Purulia district. Key: M: municipality, C: census town, R: rural/ urban centre, H: historical/ religious centre, X: craft centre, T: tourist centre, △: hills Owing to space constraints in the small map, the locations in the larger map on click through may vary slightly.

Jhalda is a town and a municipality in Purulia district in the Indian state of West Bengal. It is the headquarters of the Jhalda subdivision.

== Geography ==
=== Location ===
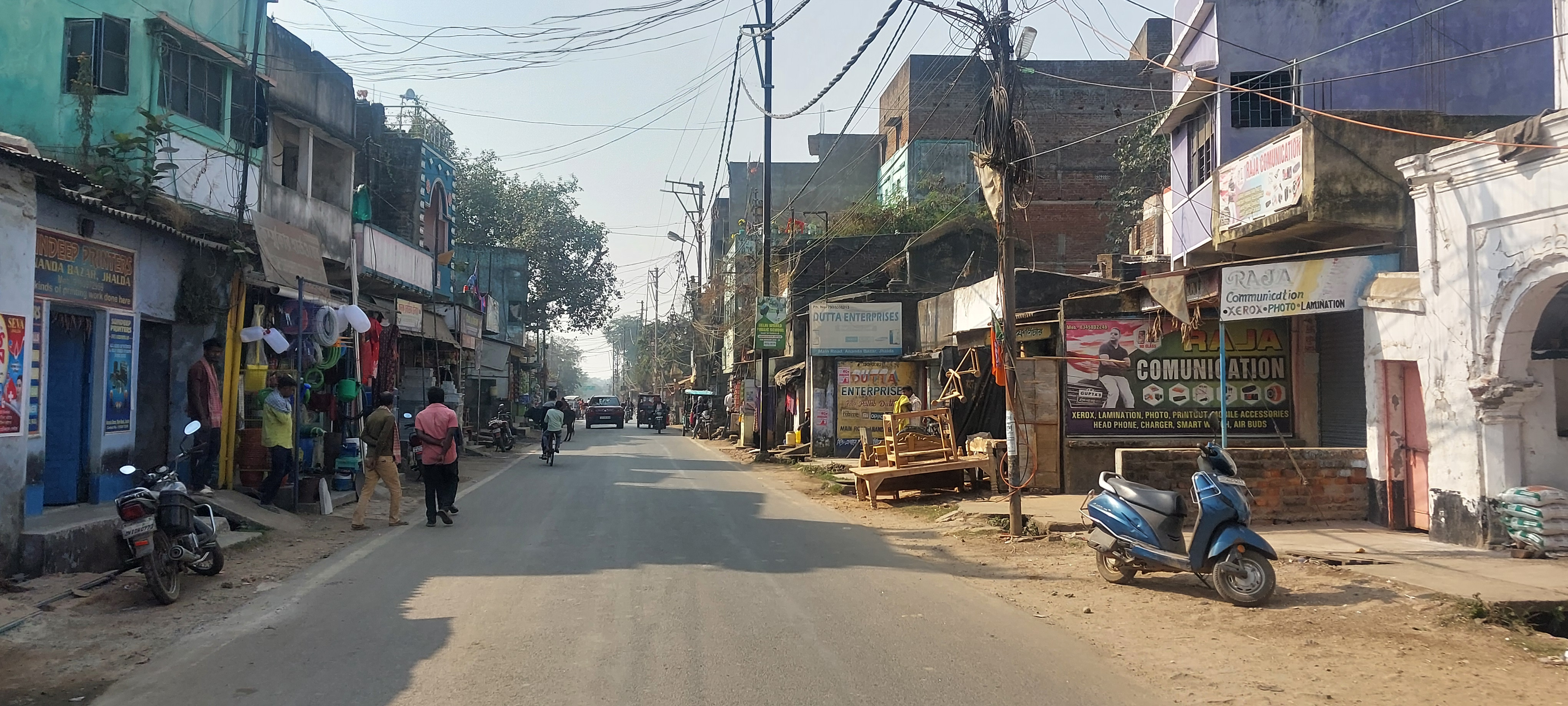
Jhalda bazar

Jhalda is located at 23.37°N 85.97°E. It has an average elevation of 293 m (961 ft).

According to the District Census Handbook 2011, Puruliya, Jhalda municipality covered an area of 3.85 km^{2} (1.49 sq mi).

=== Area overview ===
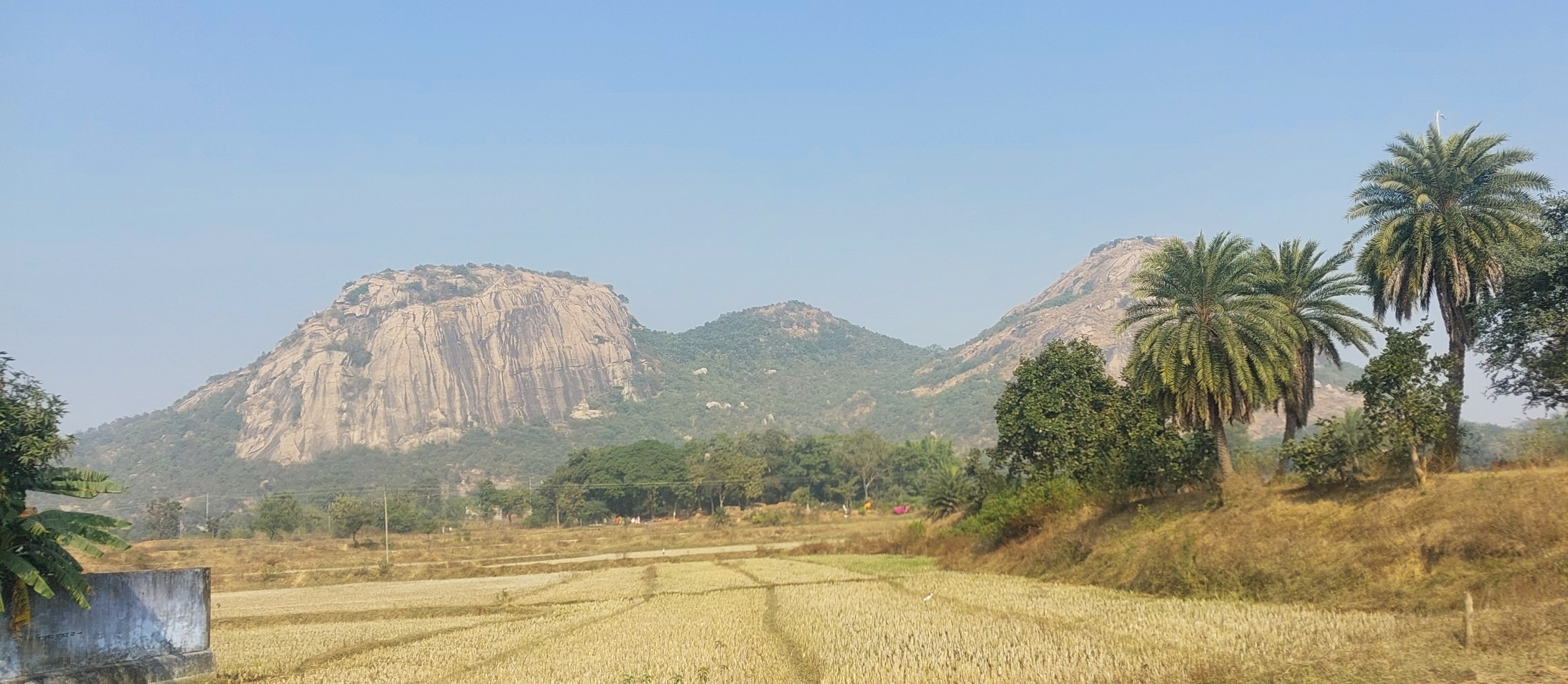
Bansa Hills at Jhalda

Purulia district forms the lowest step of the Chota Nagpur Plateau. The general scenario is undulating land with scattered hills. Jhalda subdivision, shown in the map alongside, is located in the western part of the district, bordering Jharkhand. The Subarnarekha flows along a short stretch of its western border. It is an overwhelmingly rural subdivision with 91.02% of the population living in the rural areas and 8.98% living in the urban areas. There are three census towns in the subdivision. The map alongside shows some of the tourist attractions in the Ajodhya Hills. The area is home to Purulia Chhau dance with spectacular masks made at Charida. The remnants of old temples and deities are found in the subdivision also, as in other parts of the district.

== Police station ==
Jhalda police station has jurisdiction over a part of Jhalda municipal town, Jhalda I CD block and part of Jhalda II CD block. The area covered is 290 km^{2} (110 sq mi) and a population served of 157,064 people. It has 48.7 km (30.3 mi) of inter-state border with Silli PS in Ranchi district and Kashmar and Jaridih police stations in Bokaro district of Jharkhand.

== Demographic Data ==
The Jhalda Municipality has a population of 19,544 of which 10,050 are males while 9,494 are females as per report released by Census India 2011.

The population of children aged 0-6 is 2474 which is 12.66% of total population of Jhalda (M). In Jhalda Municipality, the female sex ratio is 945 against state average of 950. Moreover the child sex ratio in Jhalda is around 982 compared to West Bengal state average of 956. literacy rate of Jhalda city is 76.78% higher than the state average of 76.26%. In Jhalda, male literacy is around 85.49% while the female literacy rate is 67.50%.

Jhalda Municipality has total administration over 3,676 houses to which it supplies basic amenities like water and sewerage. It is also authorize to build roads within Municipality limits and impose taxes on properties coming under its jurisdiction.

== Industrial History of Jhalda ==
Jhalda occupied an important place in the industrial history of the world. Shellac in various shapes and models was exported to England, Germany and the USA. But the closure of the shellac factories dealt a heavy blow to the economy of the municipal centre; other trades like bidis and cutlery have also dwindled over time.

== Tourism ==
It is a small town surrounded by small hillocks. The main hills of the area are Shikra, Bansa, Kopla, Silphoir, Dungri etc. The places of interest of the area are Norahara, Murguma Dam, Dimu Dam, Kanrior, etc. Jhalda is adjacent to the state of Jharkhand being 9 km (5.6 mi) from Muri. Jhalda Station is the main railway station in the region. The village of Kotogara is on the other side of the mountains at Jhalda. Kotogara village is in Jharkhand. One of the main areas visited locally is the Ajodhya Hills about 35 km (22 mi) from Jhalda which situated in Baghmundi.

== Transport ==
Jhalda railway station is situated on the Gomoh-Muri line. This town is also well connected with district headquarters Purulia and Ranchi by bus services. Toto and rickshaw is also available here for more comfort to travel.

== Healthcare ==
Jhalda Rural Hospital, with 30 beds, is the major government medical facility in the Jhalda I CD block.
