= Ajodhya Hills =

Hilly plateau in West Bengal, India

- অযোধ্যা পাহাড়
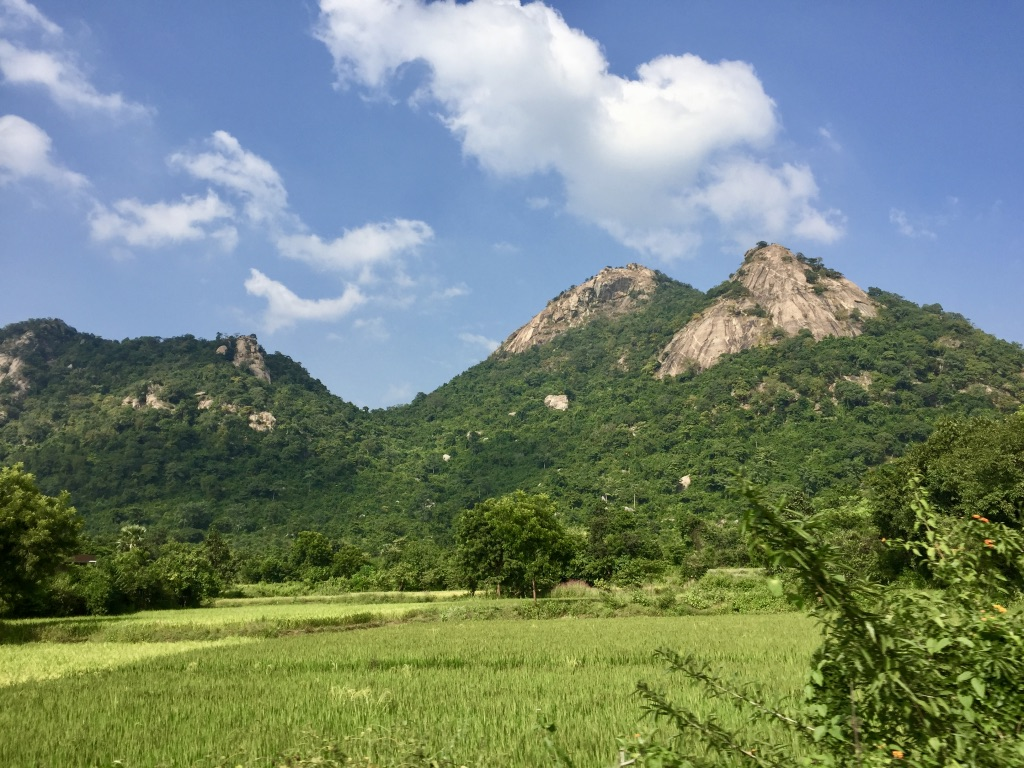

Highest point
- Peak: Chamtuburu
- Elevation: 720 m (2,360 ft)
- Listing: Hills of West Bengal
- Coordinates: 23°17′12″N 86°06′56″E

Geography
- Location within West Bengal Location within India
- Places in Jhalda subdivision in Purulia district. Key: M: municipality, C: census town, R: rural/ urban centre, H: historical/ religious centre, X: craft centre, T: tourist centre, △: hills Owing to space constraints in the small map, the locations in the larger map on click through may vary slightly.
- Location: Bagmundi, Purulia district, West Bengal, India
- Parent range: Chhotanagpur Plateau

Ajodhya Hills (Bengali: অযোধ্যা পাহাড়), is a small plateau with hilly surroundings located in the Purulia district of the state West Bengal, India. It is the easternmost part of the Chhotanagpur Plateau and extended part of Eastern Ghats range. Highest peak of Ajodhya Hills is Chamtuburu (720 m). The nearby populated town area is Bagmundi.

== Geography ==
Purulia is situated in the westernmost part of the Indian state of West Bengal and forms the lowest step of the Chota Nagpur Plateau. The district features a rugged and undulating landscape, marked by scattered hills, ridges, and plateaus. The soil is predominantly lateritic, supporting dry deciduous vegetation.

Major rivers flowing through the region include the Kangsabati, Subarnarekha, and Kumari, which play a crucial role in the district's irrigation and ecology. The Ajodhya Hills, located in the southern part of the district, are part of the extended plateau region and serve as an important ecological and tourist zone.

The climate of Purulia is classified as tropical savanna (Aw) under the Köppen climate classification. Summers are hot and dry, while winters are cool and pleasant. Rainfall occurs mainly during the monsoon months from June to September. The district is known for its scenic beauty, tribal villages, and potential for eco-tourism development.

== Overview ==
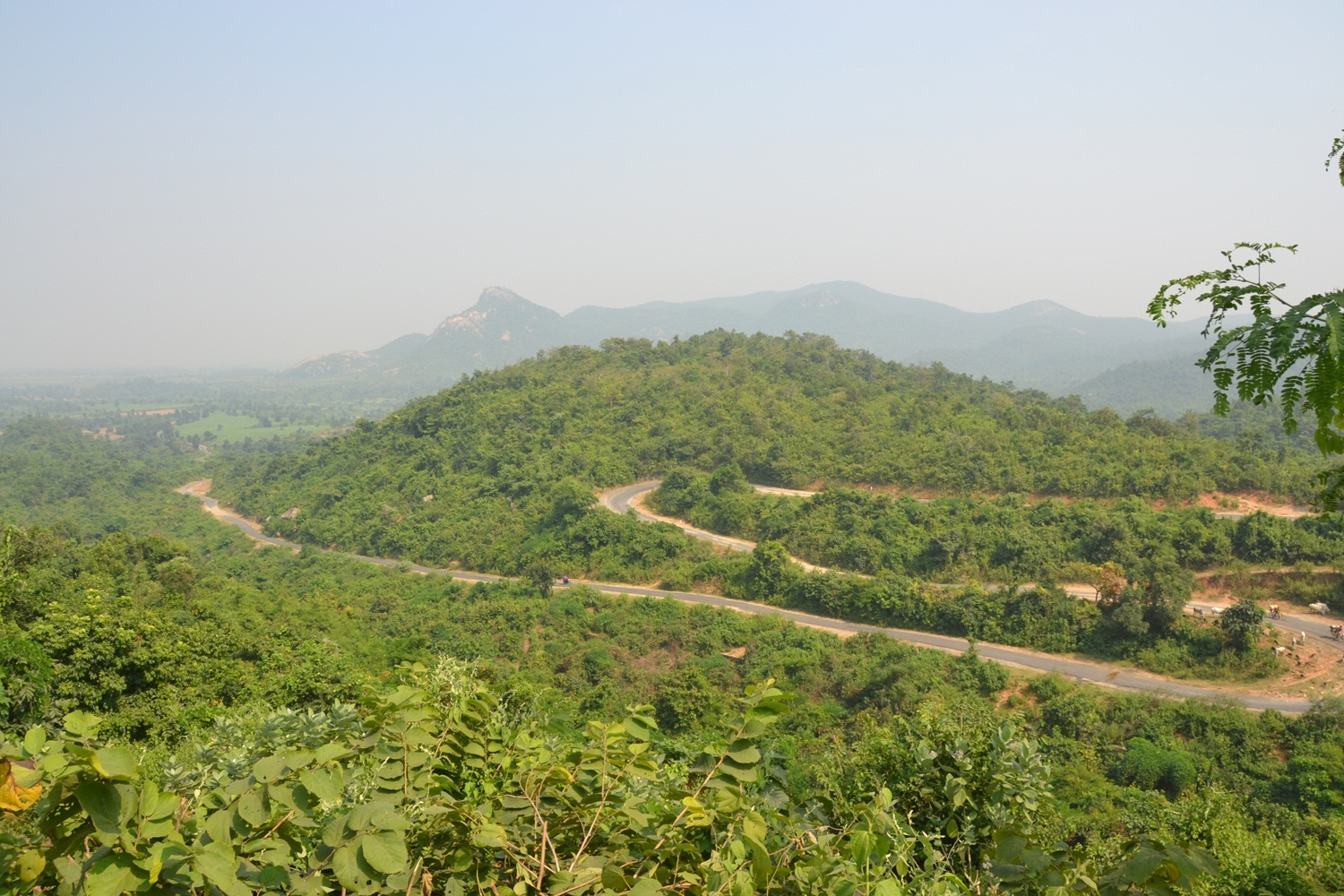
Ajodhya Hill

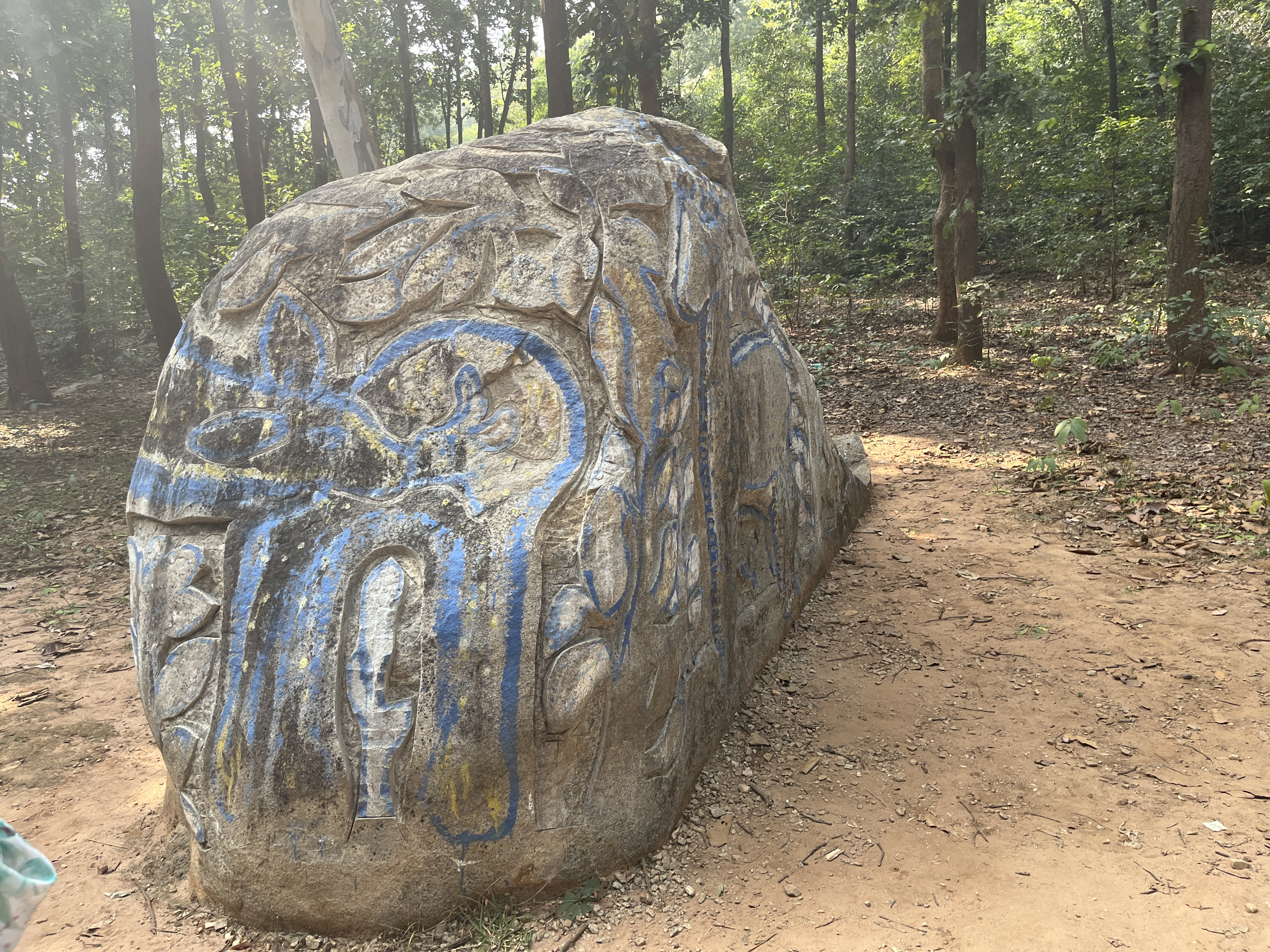
Rock cut art, Pakhi Pahar

It is a popular place for young mountaineers to learn the basic course in rock climbing. There are three routes available to reach Ajodhya Hills. Via Jhalda, via Sirkabad and via Baghmundi. There are two Forest Rest Houses here, one at Ajodhya hill top and the other is at Matha range office.Gorgaburu with a height of 677 m (2,221 ft), Mayuri etc. are some of the peaks of Ajodhya Hills range. Chamtuburu 699 m (2,293 ft) is also the highest peak of southern West Bengal.

The area forms the lowest step of the Chota Nagpur Plateau. The general scenario is undulating land with scattered hills. The area around Baghmundi or Ajodhya Hill is an extended plateau.

Highest peaks of the Ajodhya Hills
Name	Height	Notes
Chemtaburu	699 m (2,293 ft)	
Gorgaburu	642 m (2,106 ft)	
Chandni Pahar	620 m (2,030 ft)	
Ganjaburu	602 m (1,975 ft)	
Mayur Pahar	598 m (1,962 ft)	
Gojaburu	585 m (1,919 ft)	
Jajahatu	575 m (1,886 ft)	
Murraburru Hill	480 m (1,570 ft)	
Mathaburu	478 m (1,568 ft)	
Kuhuburu	468 m (1,535 ft)	

== History ==
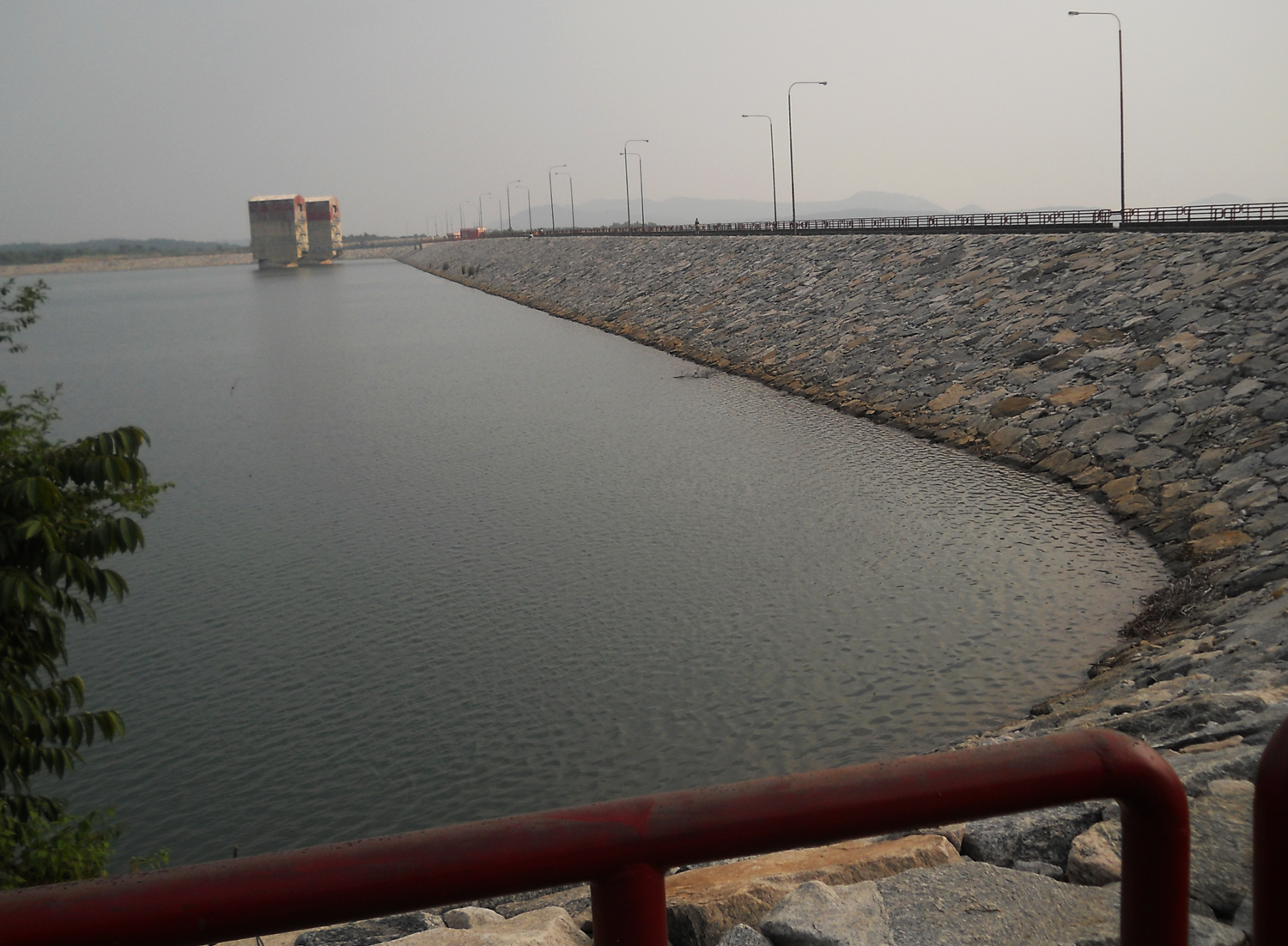
Upper Dam of The Pumped Storage Hydel Power Project

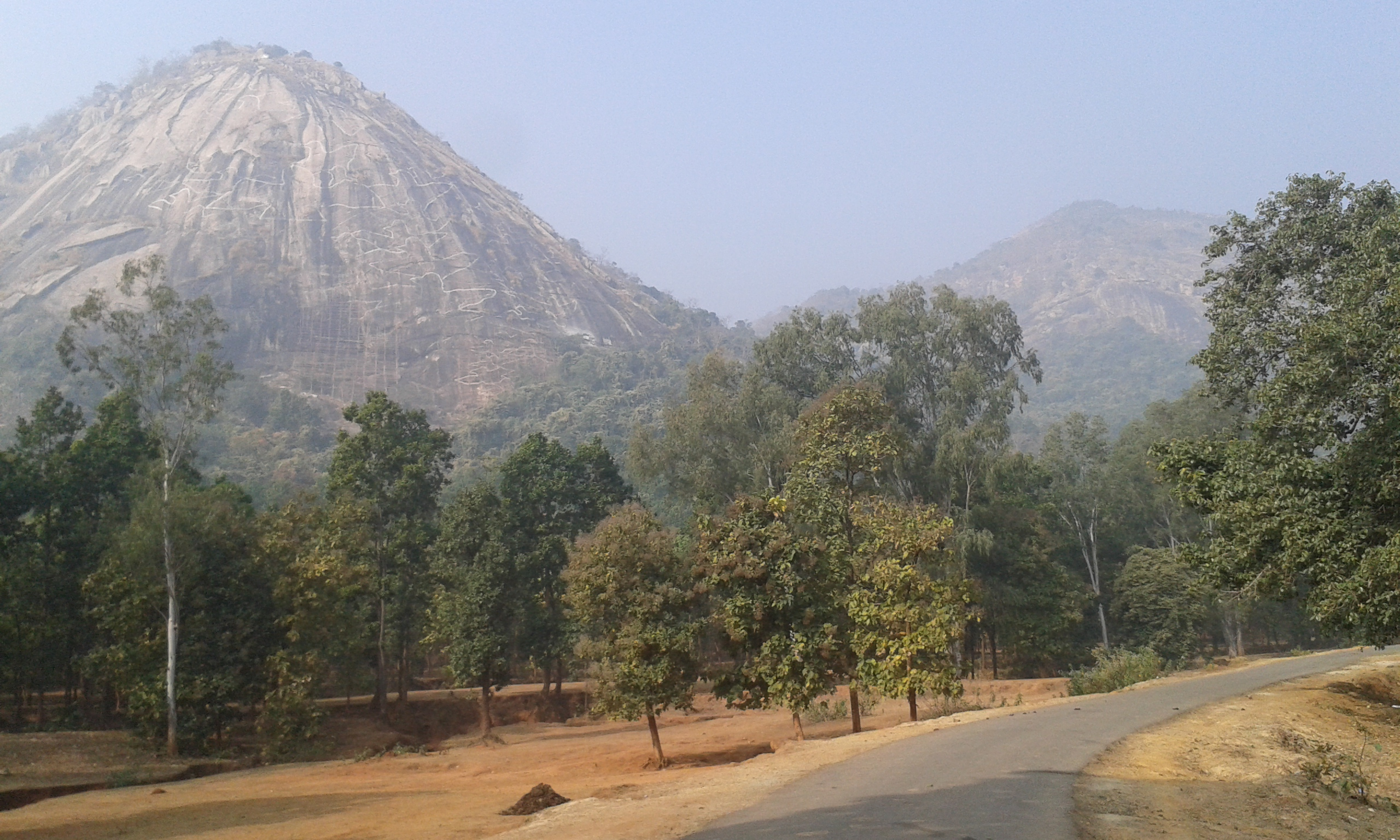
Pakhi Hills in Baghmund area

During Mughal times the area was a part of Bengal Subah. Later on after defeat of Mughals, the area became a part of Manbhum district under the British Raj. After the independence the area became a part of Bihar state. After states were reorganised in mid fifties the area came under West Bengal.

Famous Deulghata Jain temples (11th cent AD) lies about 15 K.M. north of Ajodhya Hills. Charida the village of Chhau mask makers, lies just south of the southern boundary of the hills. It is said that the mask making for famous ‘Chhau’ dance started under the auspices of king Madan Mohan Singh Deo of Banghmundi.

According to Hindu mythology, Rama and Sita had come to Ajodhya Hills and stayed during their exile. Sita was thirsty and Ram pierced an arrow through the Earth's soil crust and through that water gushed out. Sita quenched her thirst. The place is known as Sita-kunda. During the full moon day in Baisakh every year Santhal, Bhumij and Munda tribals of nearby areas come and join in the game of hunting wild animals, called Disum Sendra.

== Natural History & Heritage ==
Rocks that make up Ajodhya hills belong to a group of rocks called the Chhotanagpur Granite Gneiss Complex. They formed more than a billion years ago in Mesoproterozoic era. Since then the area underwent multiple phases of tectonic change, with metamorphic and magmatic episodes, thus forming the varieties of rocks that we see today. Prolonged erosion sculpted the area and formed its river valleys, residual hills, lakes, springs and waterfalls that make the area a major ecotourism attraction. There are at least 37 locations where tourists and geotourists can see and admire these rocks and landforms. These geosites are known for their aesthetic appeal as well as for being archives that record the history of Earth.

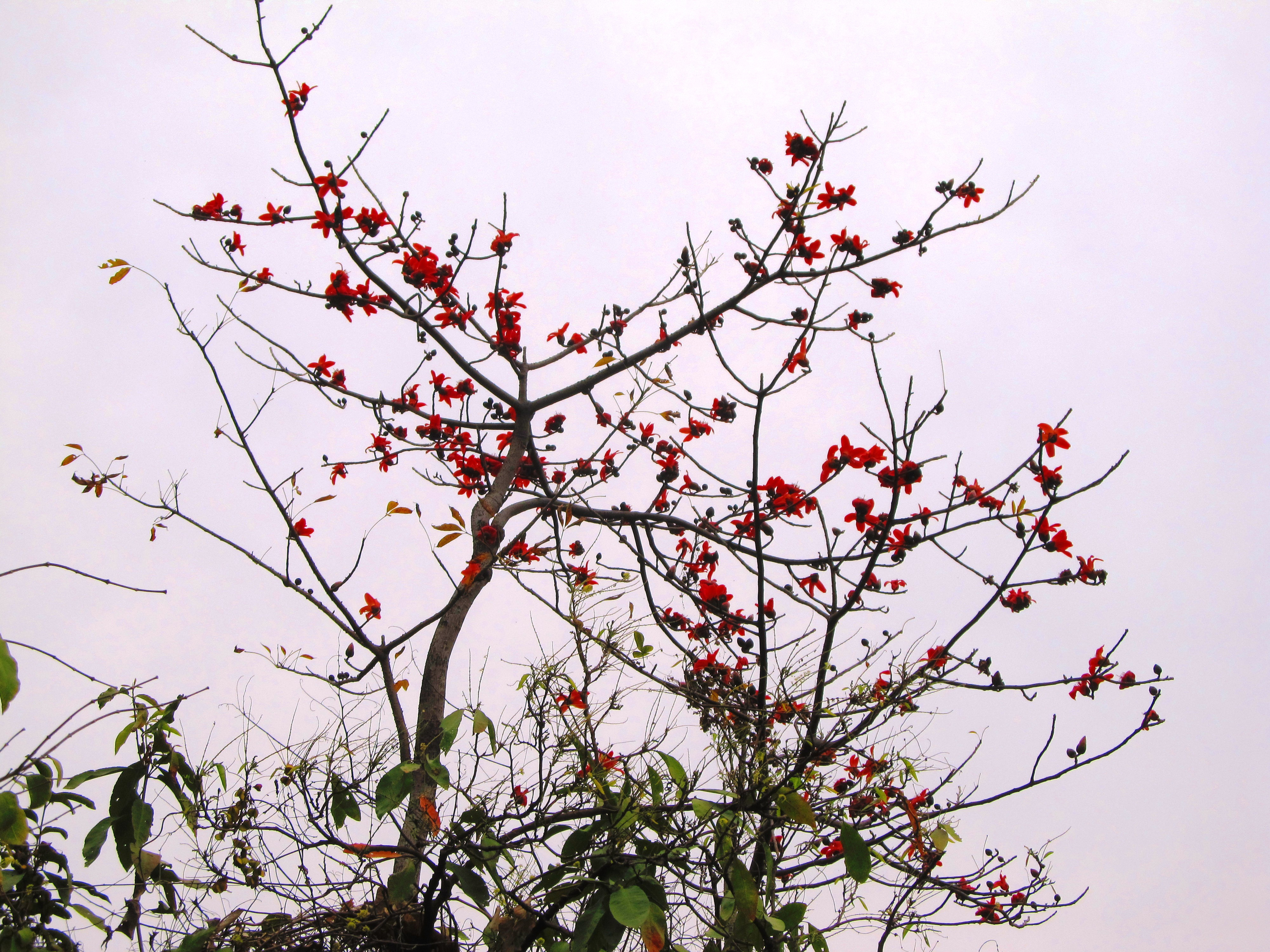
Shimul flower in summer

Apart from being geodiverse, the area is also biodiverse. Many species of mammals, amphibians, insects etc can be found in the dry, deciduous forests of the region. One such species is the Madras treeshrew which is small mammal, not common in West Bengal. Among the trees, Sal, Palash, Kusum, Mohua, Kend, and various bamboos are common.

== Distance from Kolkata ==
1. Balarampur (268m above Mean Sea Level): 319.7 km (198.7 mi)
2. Matha (260m above MSL): 335.8 km (208.7 mi)
3. Sirkabad (302m above MSL): 317.5 km (197.3 mi)
4. Ajodhya Hill Top (575m above MSL): 289.9 km (180.1 mi) (Via Sirkabad)
5. Jhalda (304m above MSL): 306.1 km (190.2 mi)

== Places to Visit based on Balarampur-Bagmundi Route ==
1. Ajodhya Hill Top: About 5 Hotels, Resorts and Lodges. 42 km from Balarampur Rly. Station via Matha. 24 km from Matha Forest Range Office. 18 km from Bagmundi.
2. Matha Forest Rest House: 18 km from Balarampur Rly. Station. 10 km from Bagmundi.
3. Bagmundi: 28 km from Balarampur Rly. Station.
4. Turga Dam and Turga Falls: 30 km from Balarampur Rly. Station. 2 km from Bagmundi.
5. Upper Dam and Lower Dam of Purulia Pumped Storage Hydel Power Project: 36 km from Balarampur Rly. Station. 18 km from Matha. 10 km from Bagmundi.
6. Paprakocha Dam, Gorgaburu Eco-Resot: 13 km from Balarampur Rly. Station. 12 km from Matha. 23 km from Bagmundi.
7. Gorgaburu Eco-Resot: 13 km from Balarampur Rly. Station. 12 km from Matha. 23 km from Bagmundi.
8. Khayrabera Dam and Chamtuburu Hill: 32 km from Balarampur Rly. Station. 14 km from Bagmundi. 24 km from Matha.
9. Machkanda Falls: 40 km from Balarampur Rly. Station. 22 km from Bagmundi. 32 km from Matha. (All via Khayrabera)
10. Chamtuburu Hill: 32 km from Balarampur Rly. Station. 14 km from Bagmundi. 24 km from Matha.
11. Bamni Falls: 40 km from Balarampur Rly. Station. 22 km from Matha. 14 km from Bagmundi.
12. Durga Bera: 39 km from Balarampur Rly. Station. 21 km from Matha. 13 km from Bagmundi.

== Places to Visit from Ajodhya Hill Top (with distance) ==
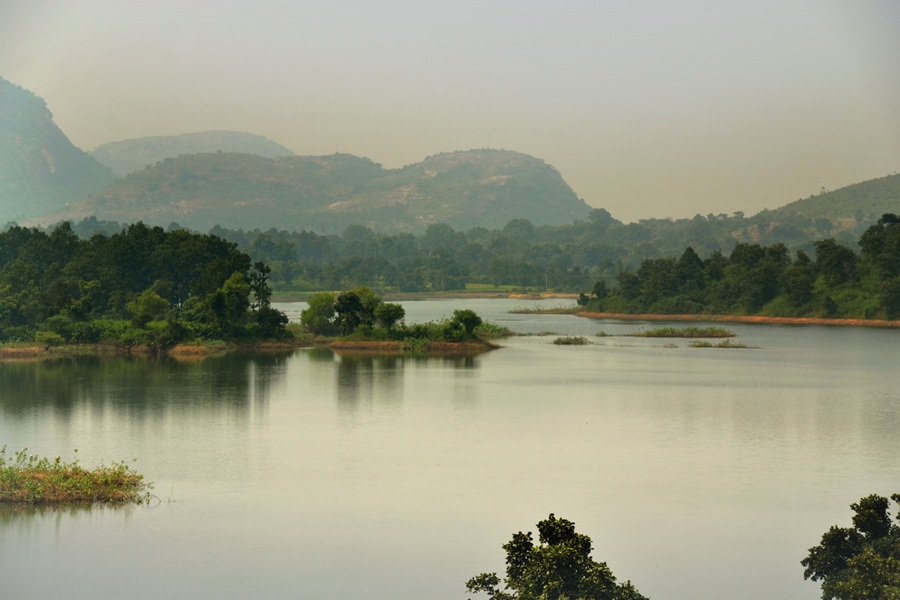
Murguma Dam /Reservoir

1. Upper Dam (495m above MSL) and Lower Dam (300m above MSL) of Purulia Pumped Storage Hydel Power Project: 6 km and 9 km on same route
2. Durga Bera (572m above MSL): 7 km
3. Bamni Falls (434m above MSL): 10 km
4. Turga Dam (284m above MSL) and Turga Falls: 18 km
5. Khayrabera Dam and Chamtuburu Hill: 21 km (via forest road), 30 km (via Bagmundi)
6. Machkanda Falls: 18 km
7. Murguma Dam: 20 km
8. Matha: 23 km
9. Baghmundi (264m above Mean Sea Level ): 16 km
10. Charida: 21 km
11. Pine Forest: 3 km
12. Mayur Pahar (605m above MSL): 2 km
13. Balarampur Rly. Station: 39 km
14. Sirkabad: 15 km
15. Murraburru Hill

== Distance from Jhalda ==
1. Murguma (338m above MSL): 16 km (9.9 mi) (Via Begunkodar)
2. Khairabera (304m above MSL): 32 km (1.2 mi) (Via Bagmundi)

== Development ==
Purulia Pumped Storage Project with an installed capacity of 900 MW (4 X 225 MW) has been set up in Ajodhya Hills under Baghmundi police station with the loan assistance of Japan Bank for International Cooperation.

Near Ajodhya Hills, there is Turga Dam and a Lake, and a waterfall formed by the River Bamni. The Turga Dam site is a tourist spot, where the visitors can spend their day.

== Gallery ==
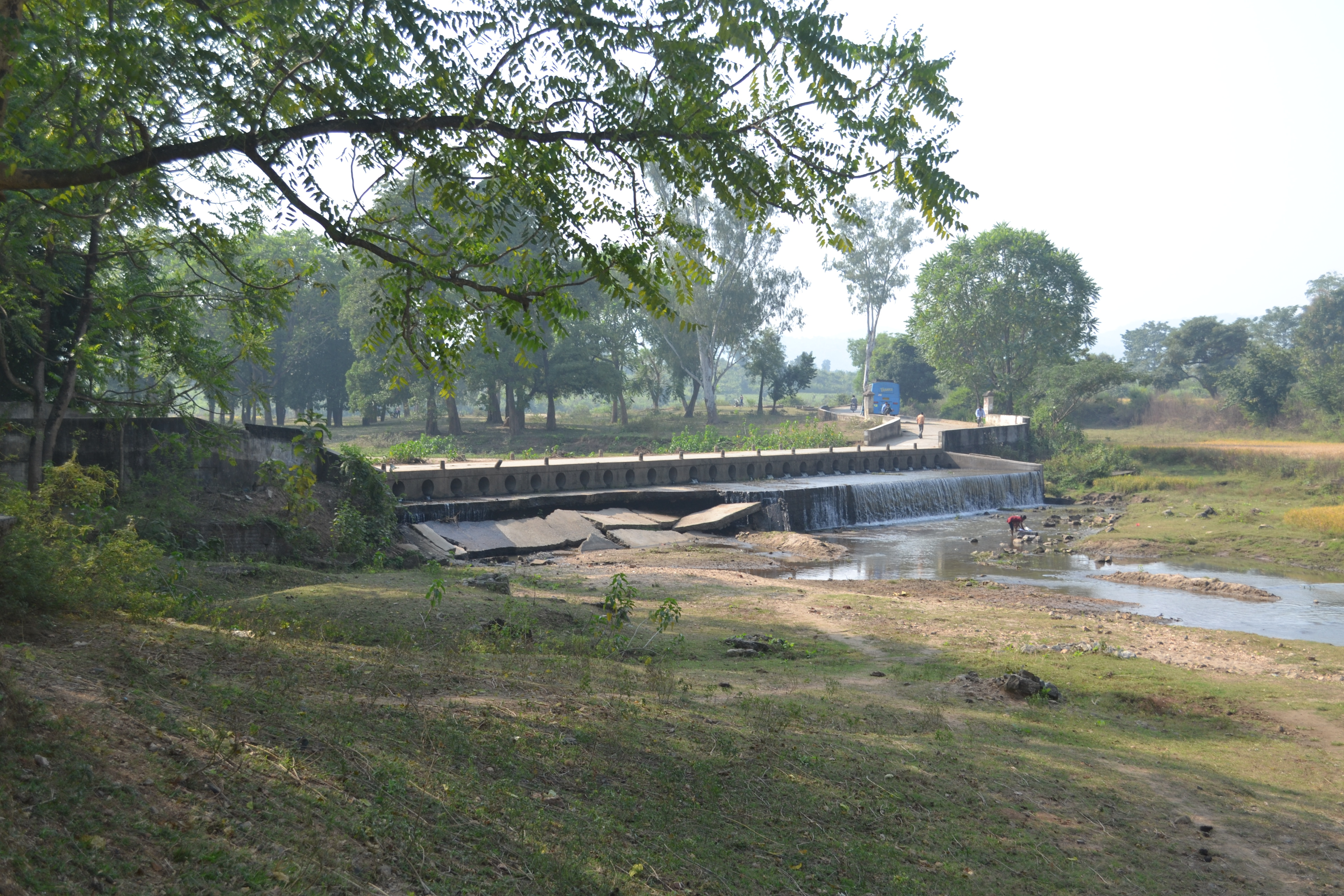
Bandhu Bridge, Entrance via Sirkabad

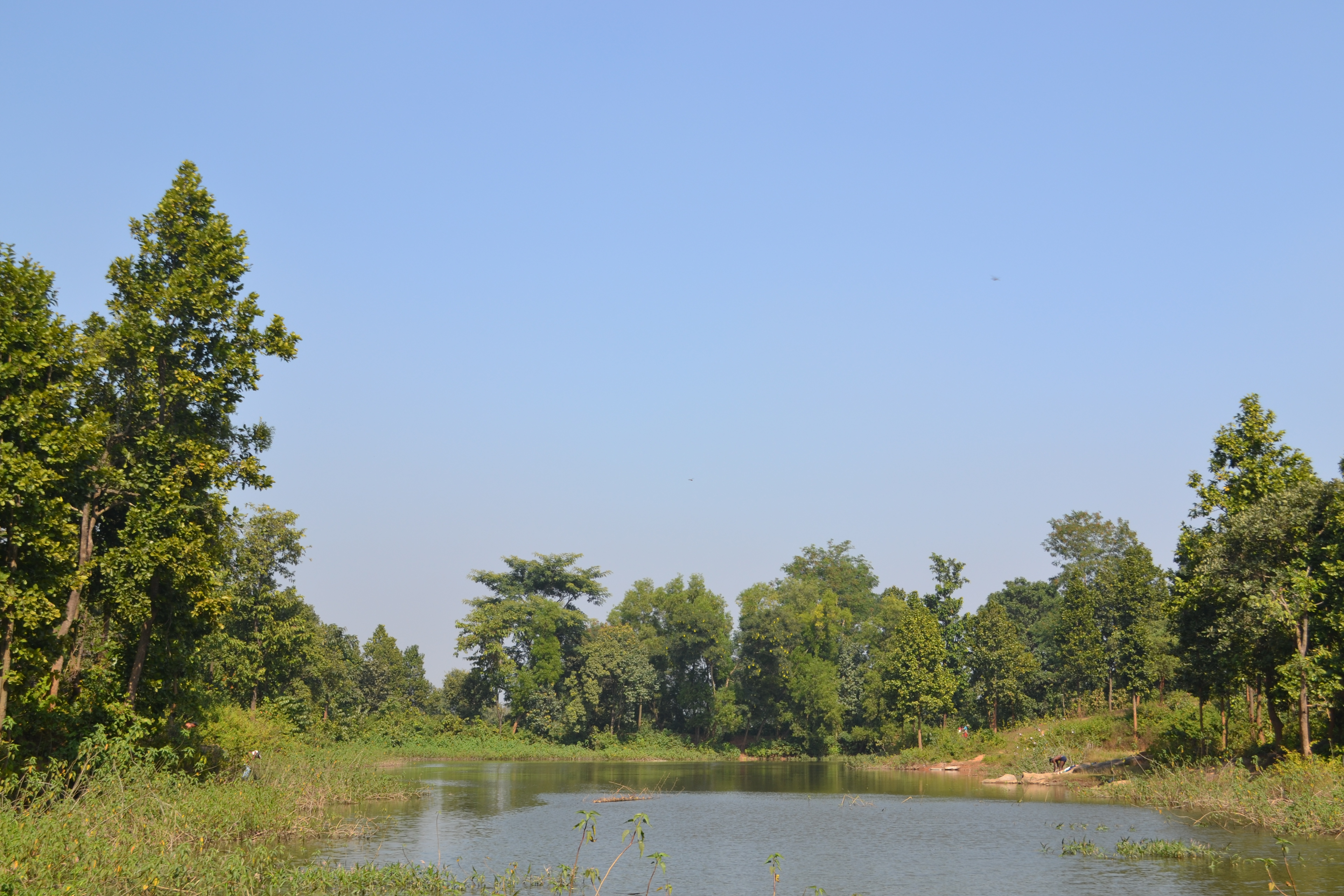
Pond at Ajodhya top

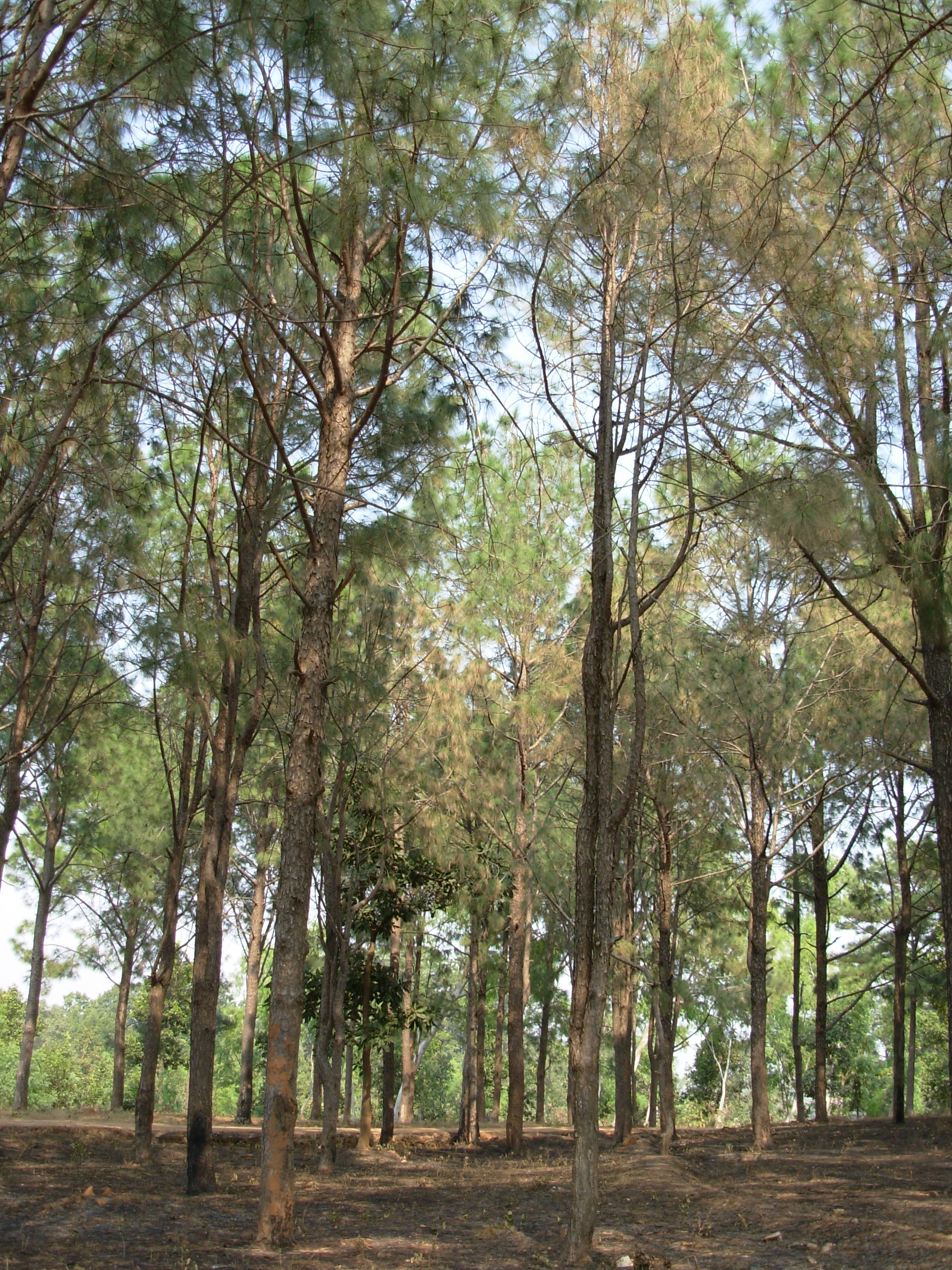
Pine forest near forest office at hill top

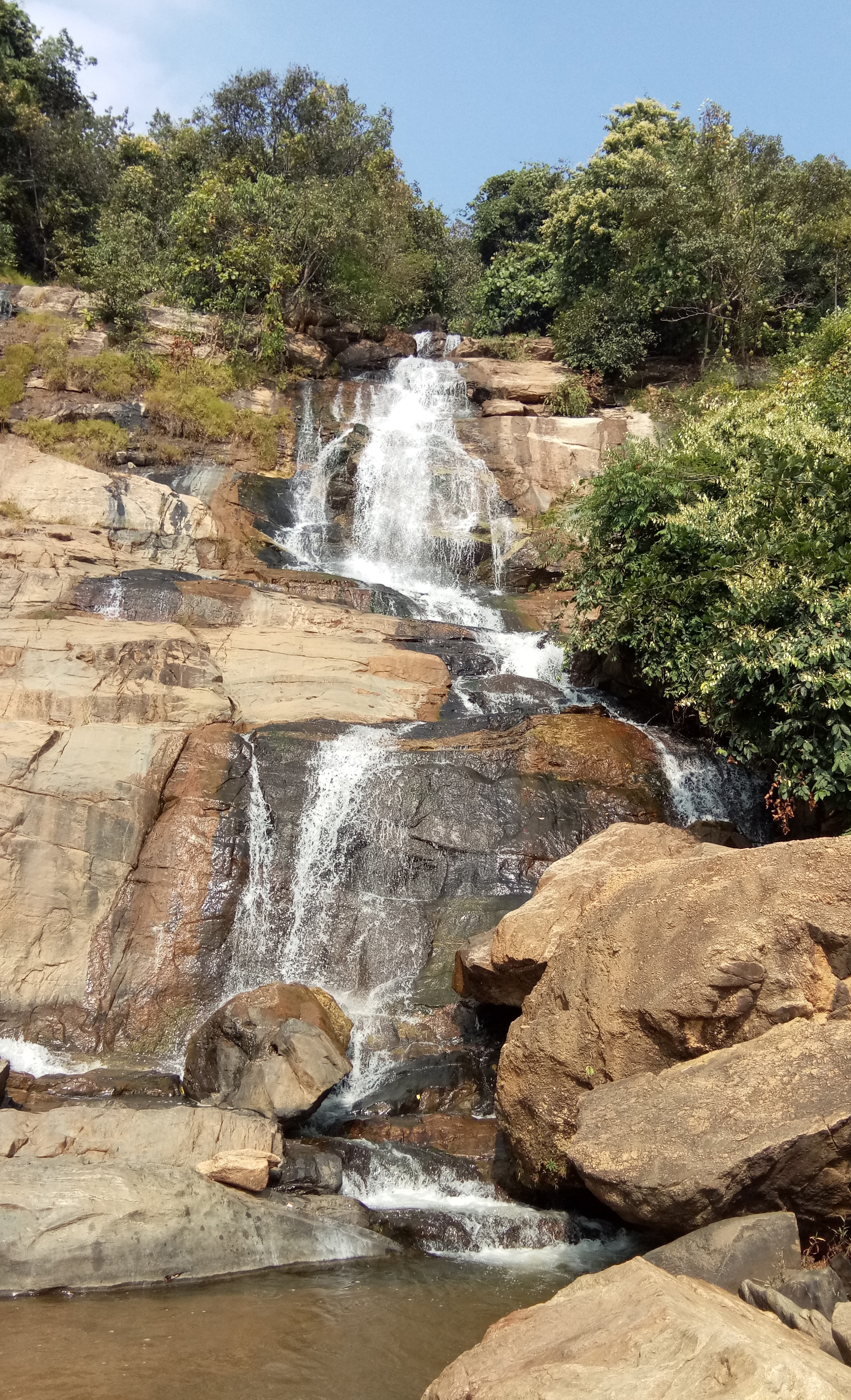
Bamni Falls

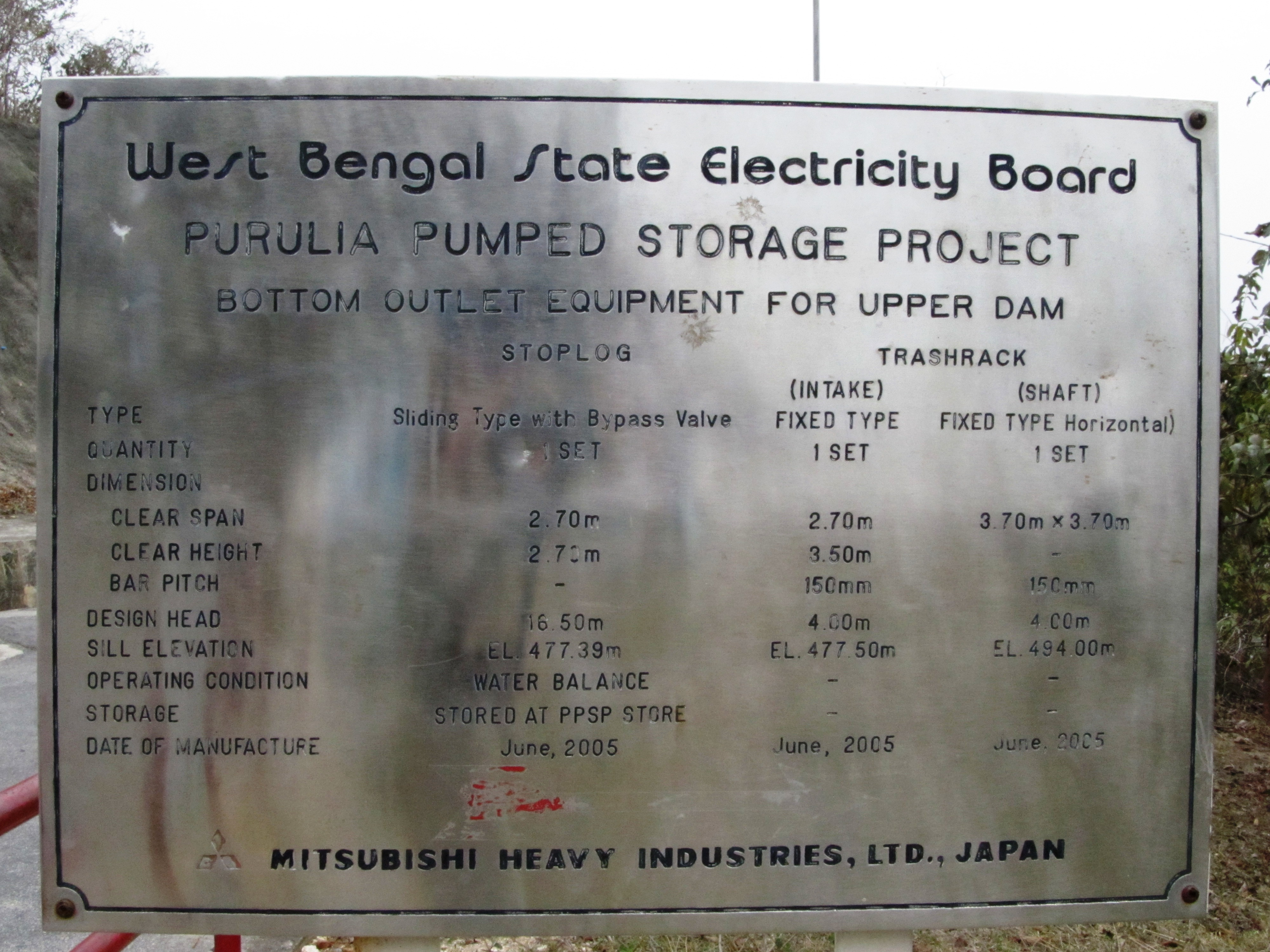
Purulia Pumped storage project

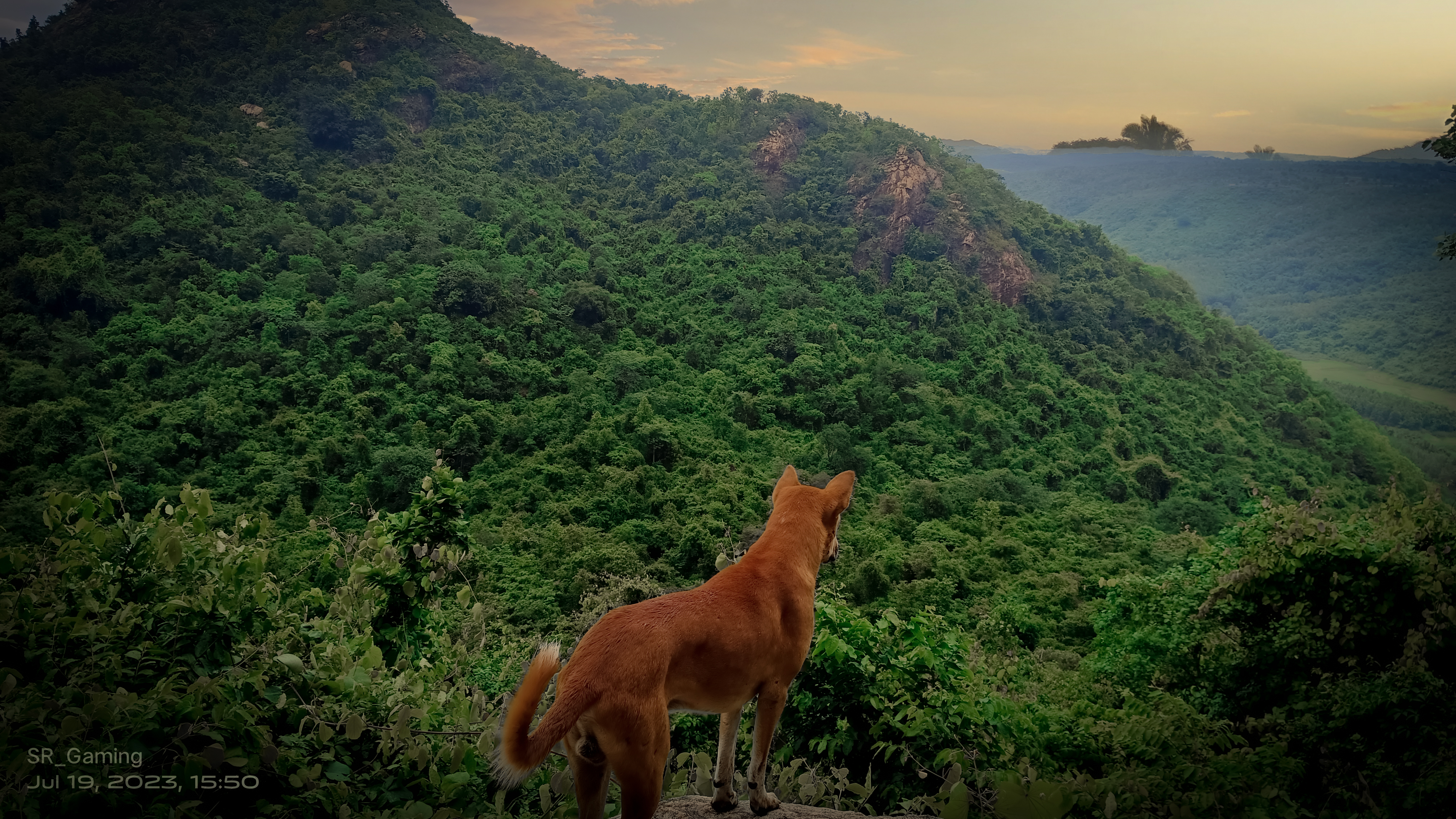
Chemtaburu Hill view point

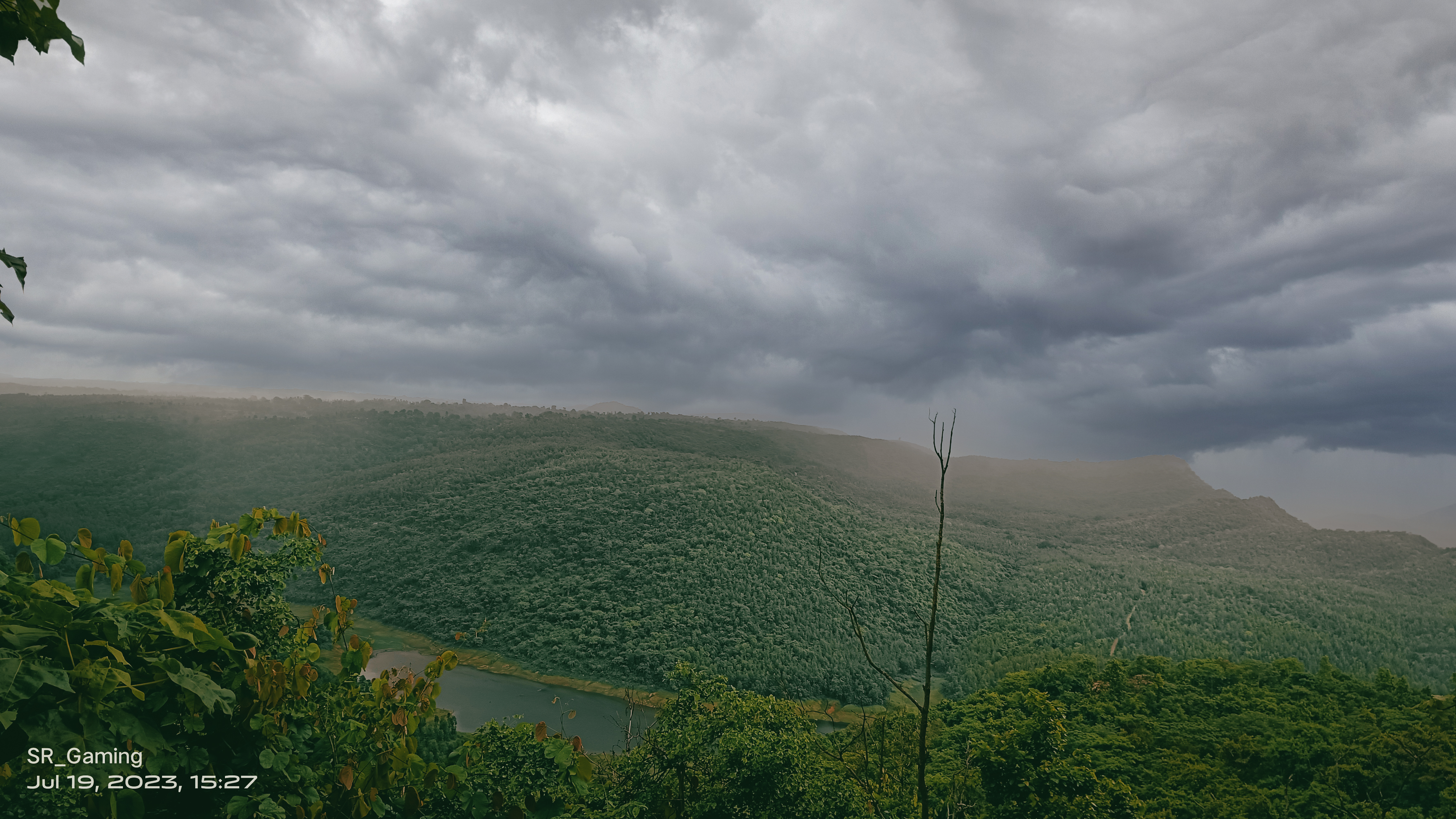
Top view from Chemtuburu Hill at 1700 ft

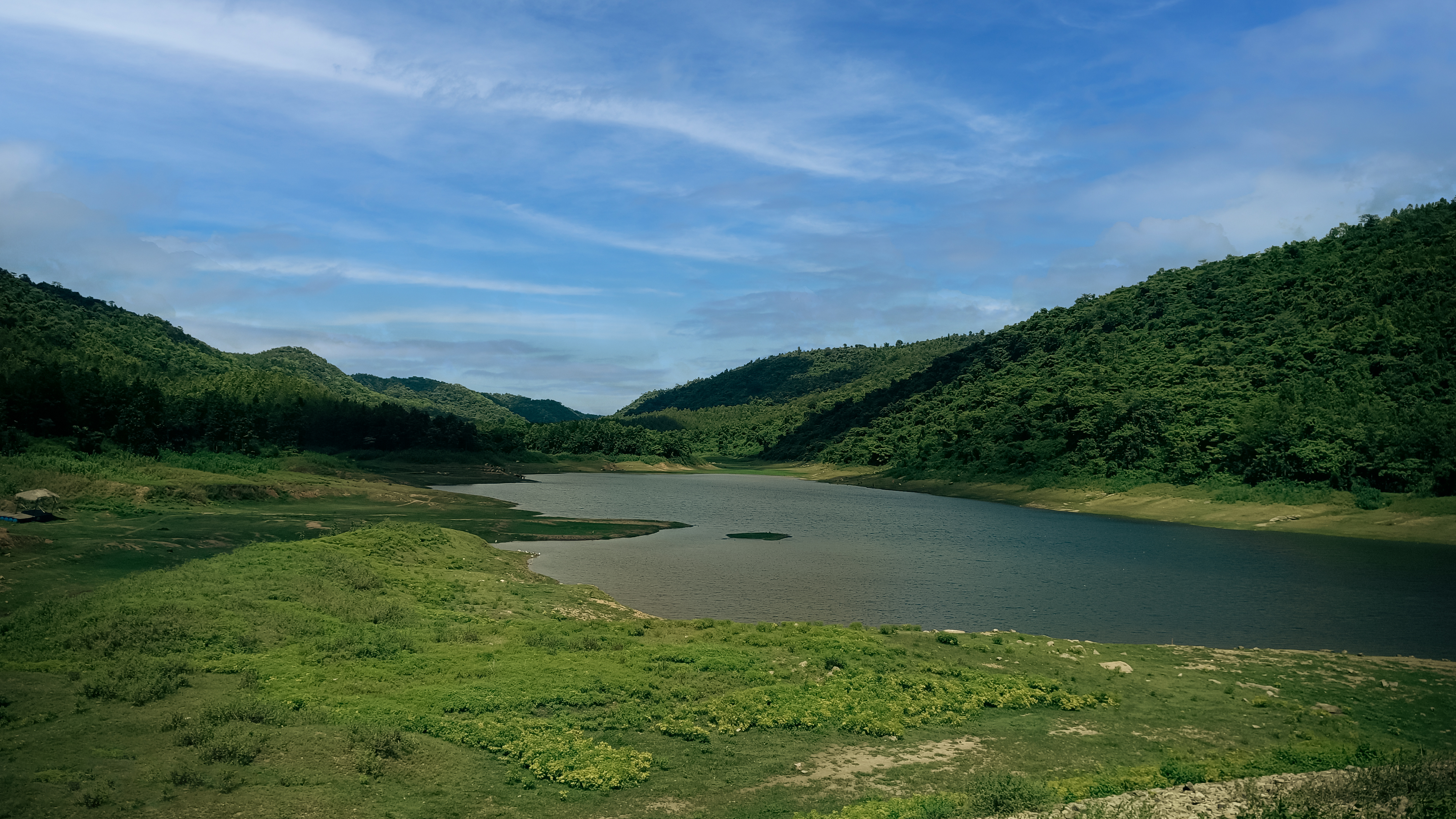
Ajodhya Chemtaburu Hill - Khairabera Dam
