= List of mountain peaks of West Bengal =

Excellent description

This is a list page of the mountains and hills found in the Indian state of West Bengal. It includes a list of the highest mountains in each of the constituent districts. Hills greater than 1,000 meter AMSL are categorized as Mountains and less than 300 meter AMSL are categorized as Hillocks. Sandakfu is the highest peak of the state located in the Singalila Ridge of Himalayas while Chemtaburu is the highest peak in the southern West Bengal on Ajodhya Hills of the extended Eastern Ghats.

== Peaks ==
Ranking	Peak	Height (m)
1	Sandakphu	3636
2	Phalut	3600
3	Sabargram	3543
4	Rachela Danda	3170
5	Tonglu	3036
6	Tiger Hill	2600
7	Ghum Hill	2400
8	Sanchuli	1924
9	Sinchula	1795
10	Deolo Hill	1704
11	Durpin Hill	1372
12	Chamtaburu	712
13	Gorgaburu	677

== Mountains ==
Ranking	Mountain	Highest peak	Height (m)	Mountain range	District
1	Singalila Ridge	Sandakphu	3636	Himalayas	Darjeeling
2	Darjeeling-Kurseong range	Tiger Hill	2600	Himalayas	Darjeeling
3	Sinchula range	Sanchuli	1924	Himalayas	Alipurduar
4	Chola range	Deolo Hill	1704	Himalayas	Kalimpong

== Hills ==
Ranking	Hill	Highest peak	Height (m)	Mountain range	District
1	Ajodhya Hills Range	Chamtaburu	719	Chota Nagpur Plateau	Purulia
2	Ajodhya Hills Range	Gorgaburu	677	Chota Nagpur Plateau	Purulia
3	Panchet Hill		490	Chota Nagpur Plateau	Purulia
4	Biharinath		451	Eastern Ghats	Bankura
5	Susunia		448	Eastern Ghats	Bankura

== Hillocks ==
Ranking	Hillock	Height (m)	Plateau/Range	District
1	Mukutmanipur	200	Dalma Hills	Bankura
2	Mama Bhagne	105	Chota Nagpur Plateau	Birbhum

== See also ==
- Joychandi Pahar
- Geography of West Bengal
- List of mountains in India
