= Swarnarekha Express =

Train in India

Swarna Rekha Express

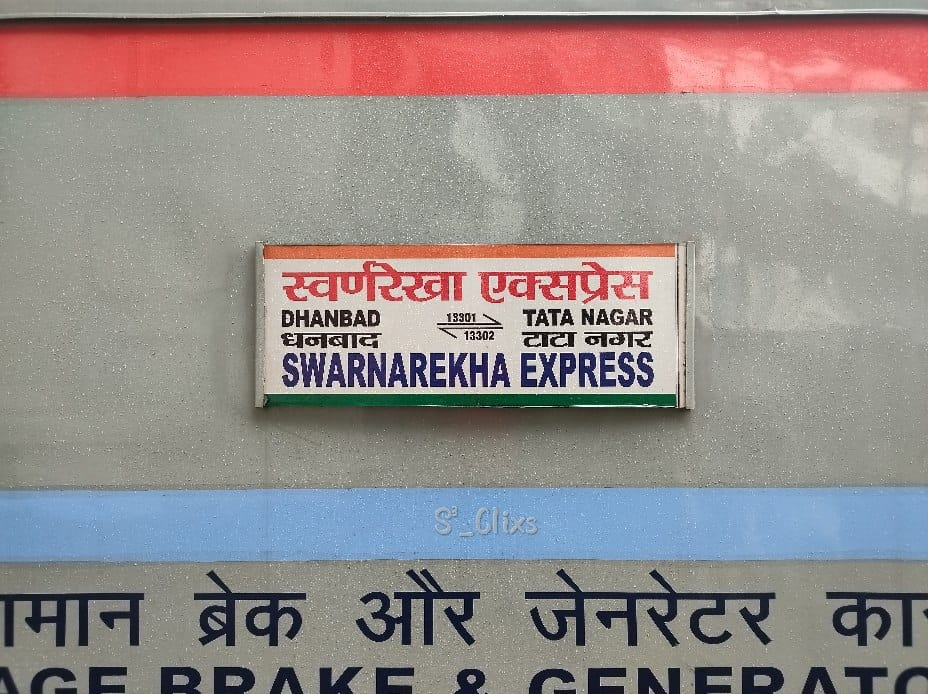
- Train Board of Swarnarekha Express

Overview
- Service type: Express
- Locale: Jharkhand
- First service: 1 July 1993; 32 years ago
- Current operator: East Central Railway

Route
- Termini: Dhanbad (DHN); Adityapur (ADTP)
- Stops: 8
- Distance travelled: 182 km (113 mi)
- Average journey time: 6 hrs 50 mins
- Service frequency: Daily
- Train number: 13301 / 13302

On-board services
- Classes: AC Chair Car, Second Class Seating, General Unreserved
- Seating arrangements: Yes
- Sleeping arrangements: No
- Auto-rack arrangements: Overhead racks
- Catering facilities: E-catering only
- Observation facilities: Large windows
- Baggage facilities: No
- Other facilities: Below the seats

Technical
- Rolling stock: LHB coach
- Track gauge: 1,676 mm (5 ft 6 in)
- Operating speed: 28 km/h (17 mph) average including halts.

The 13301 / 13302 Swarna Rekha Express is a daily express train service between Dhanbad Junction and Adityapur. It is a day train and covers the distance of 182 km in 6 hours and 50 minutes, at an average speed of 28 km/h. It has AC chair car, second-class sitting, and general type of coaches. All classes except general class require prior reservation, whereas general coaches can be boarded with a general daily ticket. No pantry car is available in the train. The Tatkal scheme is available in this train.

Previously, 13301/13302 Swarna Rekha Express used to run between Dhanbad Junction and Tatanagar. From February 06, 2026 the terminal of 13301/13302 Dhanbad - Tatanagar Swarna Rekha Express was changed to Adityapur Railway Station.

== Route and halts ==
13301 and 13302 Swarnarekha Express :
Sr.	13301 DHN–ADTP (Daily)				13302 ADTP–DHN (Daily)			
Sr.	Station	PF	Arr.	Dep.	Station	PF	Arr.	Dep.
1	Dhanbad Junction	6	—	05:30	Adityapur	3	—	15:35
2	Pathardih Junction	1	06:25	06:35	Chandil Junction	2	16:28	16:30
3	Bhojudih Junction	2	07:19	07:20	Barabhum	2	16:54	16:55
4	Santaldih	1	07:30	07:31	Purulia Junction	3	17:28	17:30
5	Adra Junction	2	08:05	08:25	Anara	2	17:58	18:00
6	Anara	1	08:43	08:45	Adra Junction	2	18:40	19:00
7	Purulia Junction	4	09:20	09:25	Santaldih	2	19:33	19:34
8	Barabhum	1	09:58	10:00	Bhojudih Junction	1	19:49	19:50
9	Chandil Junction	3	10:28	10:30	Pathardih Junction	1	20:35	20:45
10	Adityapur	4	12:05	—	Dhanbad Junction	6	22:25	—

== Direction reversals ==
The train reverses its direction twice at;

- Pathardih
- Adra Junction.

== Traction ==
It is hauled by a DDU Loco Shed / Samastipur Loco Shed based WAP-4 electric locomotive from Dhanbad to Adityapur and vice versa.
