= Parvathipuram =

Parvathipuram or Parvatipuram may refer to these places in India:

- Parvathipuram, Andhra Pradesh, town
  - Parvathipuram railway station
  - Parvathipuram Town railway station
  - Parvathipuram (Assembly constituency)
  - Parvathipuram (Lok Sabha constituency)
  - Parvathipuram Manyam district
  - Parvathipuram revenue division
- Parvathipuram, Tamil Nadu

== See also ==
- Parbatipur (disambiguation)
