= Nimdih railway station =

Railway station in Jharkhand, India

Nimdih Railway Station

General information
- Location: National Highway 18, Nimdih, Seraikela Kharsawan district, Jharkhand; India
- Coordinates: 23°59′37″N 86°08′32″E
- Elevation: 211 metres (692 ft)
- System: Indian Railway
- Line: Asansol–Tatanagar–Kharagpur line
- Platforms: 2
- Tracks: 2

Construction
- Structure type: At Ground

Other information
- Station code: NIM
- Zone(s): South Eastern Railway
- Division(s): Adra

History
- Opened: 1890
- Electrified: 1961–62
- Former names: Bengal Nagpur Railway

Services
Preceding station	Indian Railways	Following station
Biramdih towards Purulia Junction	South Eastern Railway zone Purulia–Tatanagar line	Chandil towards Tatanagar Junction
Location

Nimdih Railway Station is a railway station on Purulia–Tatanagar line of Adra railway division of Indian Railways' South Eastern Railway zone. It is situated beside National Highway 18 at Nimdih in Seraikela Kharsawan district in the Indian state of Jharkhand. Total 12 trains stop at Nimdih railway station.

== History ==
The Bengal Nagpur Railway was formed in 1887 for the purpose of upgrading the Nagpur Chhattisgarh Railway. Purulia–Chakradharpur rail line was opened on 22 January 1890. The Purulia–Chakradharpur rout including Nimdih railway station was electrified in 1961–62.
