= Biramdih railway station =

Railway station in West Bengal, India

General information
- Location: Biramdih, Balarampur, Purulia district, West Bengal; India
- Coordinates: 23°02′45″N 86°11′57″E
- Elevation: 269 metres (883 ft)
- System: Indian Railway
- Line: Asansol–Tatanagar–Kharagpur line
- Platforms: 2
- Tracks: 2

Construction
- Structure type: At Ground

Other information
- Station code: BRMD
- Zone(s): South Eastern Railway
- Division(s): Adra

History
- Opened: 1890
- Electrified: 1961–62
- Former names: Bengal Nagpur Railway

Services
Preceding station	Indian Railways	Following station
Barabhum towards Purulia Junction	South Eastern Railway zone Purulia–Tatanagar line	Nimdih towards Tatanagar Junction
Location

Biramdih railway station is a railway station on Purulia–Tatanagar line of Adra railway division of Indian Railways' South Eastern Railway zone. It is situated at Biramdih, Balarampur in Purulia district in the Indian state of West Bengal. Total 12 trains stop at Biramdih railway station.

== History ==
The Bengal Nagpur Railway was formed in 1887 for the purpose of upgrading the Nagpur Chhattisgarh Railway. Purulia–Chakradharpur rail line was opened on 22 January 1890. The Purulia–Chakradharpur rout including Biramdih railway station was electrified in 1961–62.
