= Tamna railway station =

Railway station in West Bengal, India

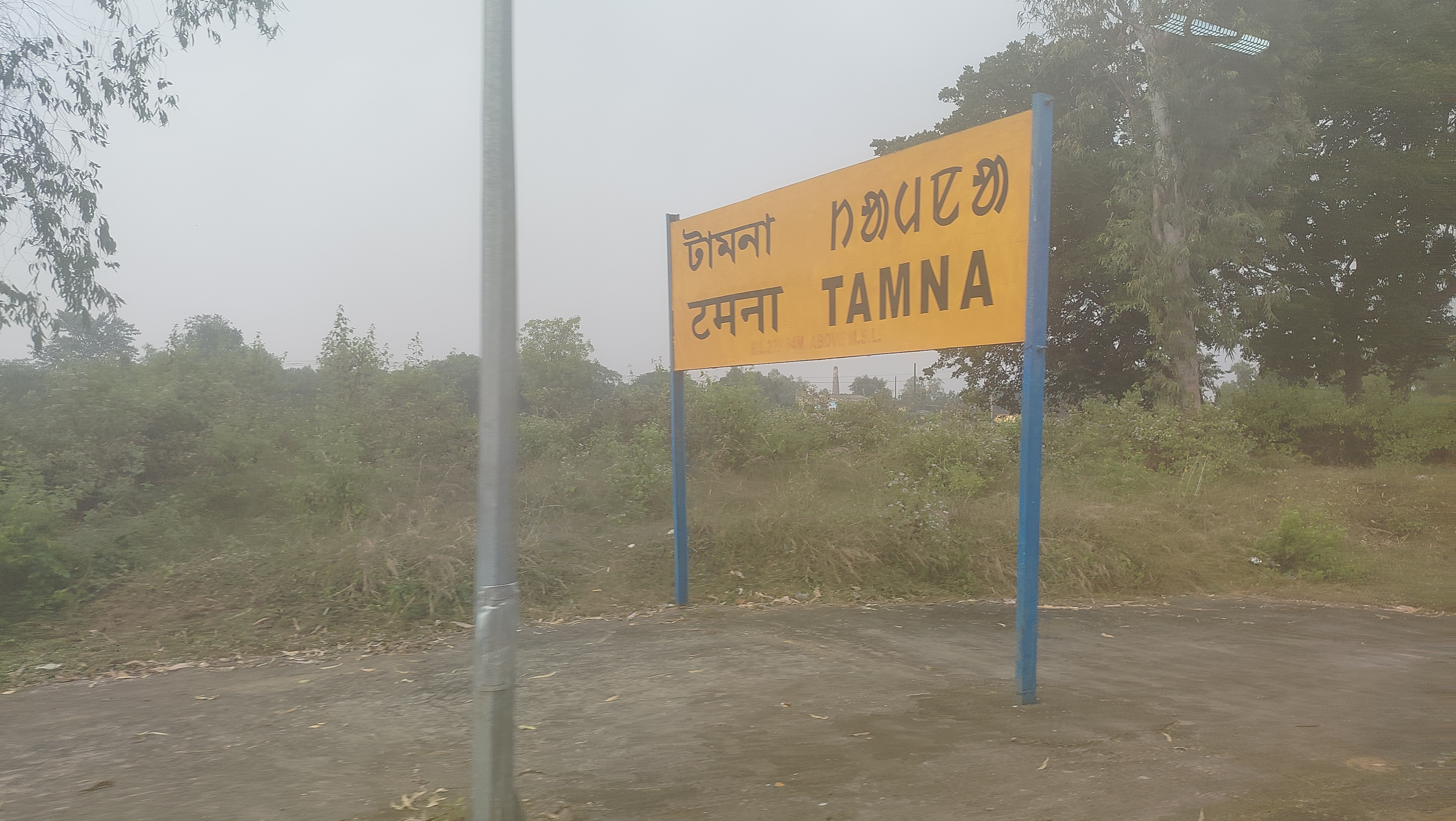
- Tamna railway station

General information
- Location: National Highway 32, Damda, Tamna, Purulia district, West Bengal; India
- Coordinates: 23°16′08″N 86°21′08″E
- Elevation: 236 metres (774 ft)
- System: Indian Railway
- Line: Asansol–Tatanagar–Kharagpur line
- Platforms: 2
- Tracks: 2

Construction
- Structure type: At Ground
- Parking: Available

Other information
- Station code: TAO
- Zone(s): South Eastern Railway
- Division(s): Adra

History
- Opened: 1890
- Electrified: 1961–62
- Former names: Bengal Nagpur Railway

Services
Preceding station	Indian Railways	Following station
Purulia Junction Terminus	South Eastern Railway zone Purulia–Tatanagar line	Kantadih towards Tatanagar Junction
Location

Tamna railway station is a railway station on Purulia–Tatanagar line of Adra railway division of Indian Railways' South Eastern Railway zone. It is situated beside National Highway 32 at Damda, Tamna in Purulia district in the Indian state of West Bengal.

== History ==
The Bengal Nagpur Railway was formed in 1887 for the purpose of upgrading the Nagpur Chhattisgarh Railway. Purulia–Chakradharpur rail line was opened on 22 January 1890. The Purulia–Chakradharpur rout including Tamna railway station was electrified in 1961–62.
