= Urma railway station =

Railway Station in West Bengal, India

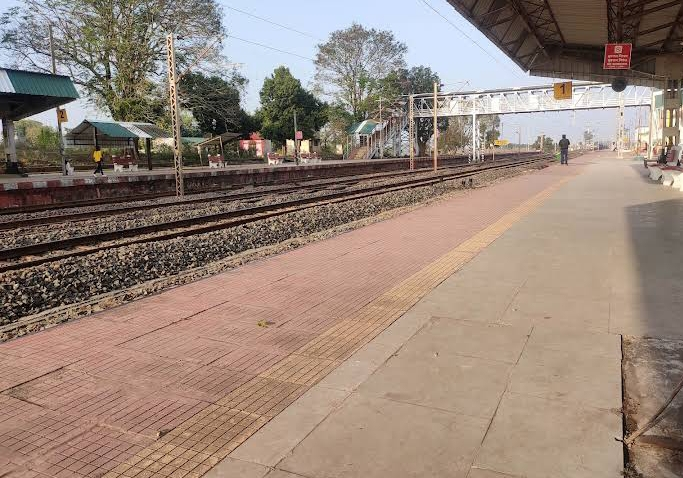

General information
- Location: National Highway 32, Chhota Urma, Purulia district, West Bengal; India
- Coordinates: 23°09′28″N 86°15′14″E
- Elevation: 269 metres (883 ft)
- System: Indian Railway
- Line: Asansol–Tatanagar–Kharagpur line
- Platforms: 2
- Tracks: 2

Construction
- Structure type: At Ground

Other information
- Station code: URMA
- Zone(s): South Eastern Railway
- Division(s): Adra

History
- Opened: 1890
- Electrified: 1961–62
- Former names: Bengal Nagpur Railway

Services
| Preceding station | Indian Railways | Following station |
|---|---|---|
| Kantadih towards Purulia Junction | South Eastern Railway zone Purulia–Tatanagar line | Barabhum towards Tatanagar Junction |
Location

Urma railway station is a railway station on Purulia–Tatanagar line of Adra railway division of Indian Railways' South Eastern Railway zone. It is situated beside National Highway 32 at Chhota Urma in Purulia district in the Indian state of West Bengal. Total 16 trains stop at this station.

== History ==
The Bengal Nagpur Railway was formed in 1887 for the purpose of upgrading the Nagpur Chhattisgarh Railway. Purulia–Chakradharpur rail line was opened on 22 January 1890. The Purulia–Chakradharpur rout including Urma railway station was electrified in 1961–62.
