= Sudamdih railway station =

Railway station in Jharkhand

Sudamdih

General information
- Location: Sudamdih, Dhanbad, Jharkhand; India
- Coordinates: 23°39′16″N 86°26′26″E
- Elevation: 145 metres (476 ft)
- System: Indian Railways junction station
- Owner: Indian Railways
- Operator: South Eastern Railway
- Lines: Railways in Jharia Coalfield; Sudamdih-Bhojudih link to Adra–Netaji S.C.Bose Gomoh branch line
- Platforms: 1

Construction
- Structure type: Standard (on-ground station)
- Parking: Yes
- Cycle facilities: No

Other information
- Status: Functioning
- Station code: SDMD
- Division(s): Adra

History
- Opened: 1907
- Electrified: 1965–66

Passengers
- 15000+

Services
Preceding station	Indian Railways	Following station
Jamadoba towards ?	South Eastern Railway zone Railways in Jharia Coalfield	Pathardih towards ?
Jamadoba towards ?	Eastern Railway zone Railways in Jharia Coalfield	Sindri towards ?
Terminus	South Eastern Railway zone Link to Adra–Netaji SC Bose Gomoh branch line	Bhojudih towards ?
Location
- Location within Jharkhand Location within India

Sudamdih is a railway station on the Railways in Jharia Coalfield, just north of the Damodar and links to Bhojudih, south of the Damodar, and on the Adra–Netaji S.C.Bose Gomoh branch line. It is located in Dhanbad district in the Indian state of Jharkhand. It serves Sudamdih, Sudamdih colliery and Sudamdih washery.

== History ==
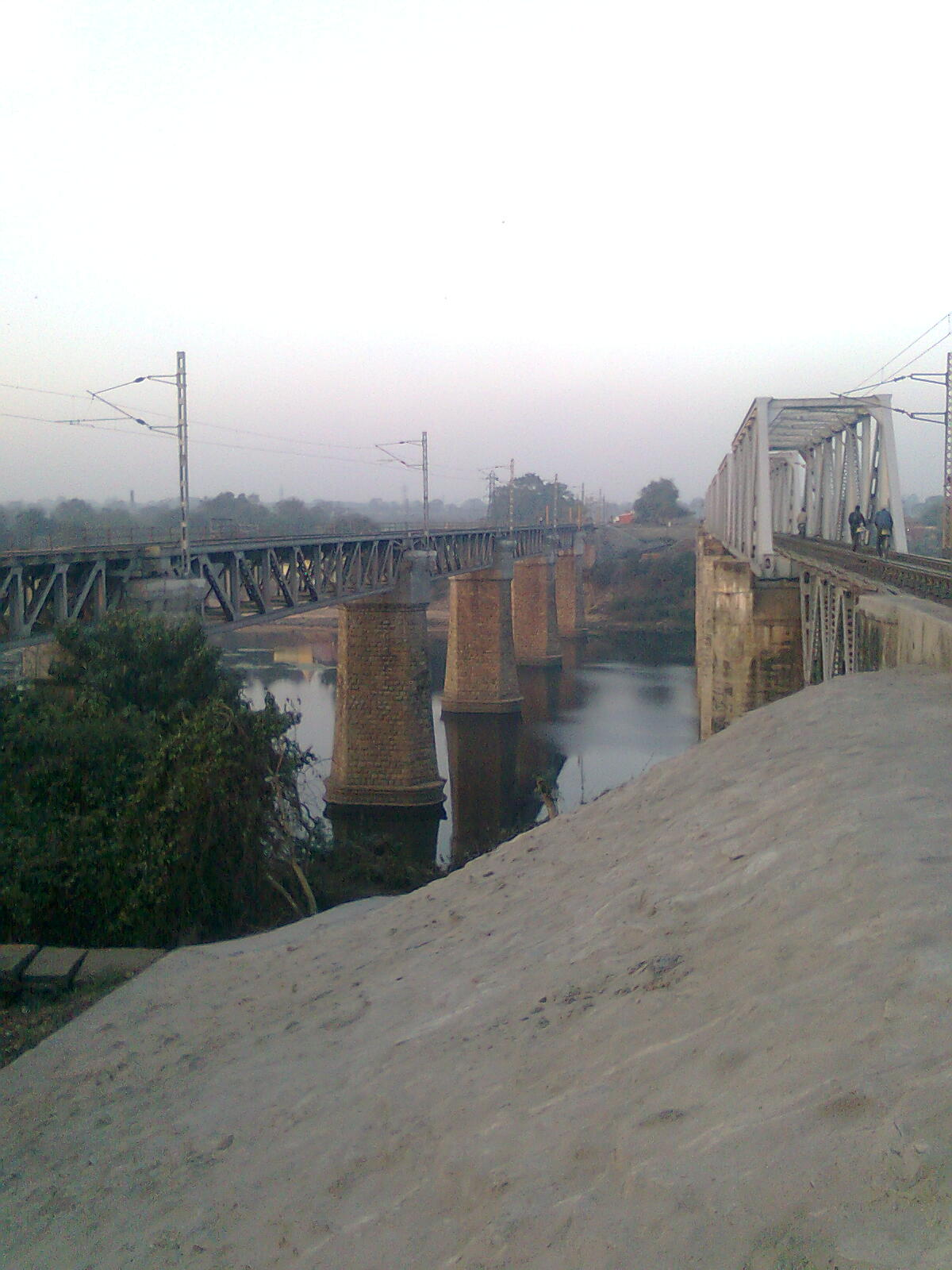
Bridges across the Damodar linking Sudamdih with Bhojudih

The East Indian Railway Company extended the Grand Chord to Katrasgarh via Dhanbad in 1894.

The Bengal Nagpur Railway extended its then mainline, the Nagpur–Asansol line, to Netaji S.C.Bose Gomoh, on East Indian Railway's main line, in 1907. The Mohuda–Chandrapura branch line was opened in 1913.

== Electrification ==
The Santaldih–Pathardih–Sudamdih–Jamadoba sector was electrified in 1965–66.

== Passenger movement ==
Sudamdih railway station serves around 15,000 passengers every day.
