= Bhojudih railway station =

Railway station in Jharkhand, India

BHOJUDIH JUNCTION
- Indian Railways logo

General information
- Location: Santaldih Road, Bhojudih, District: Bokaro, Jharkhand; India
- Coordinates: 23°38′31″N 86°26′49″E
- Elevation: 157 metres (515 ft)
- System: Indian Railways junction station
- Owner: Indian Railways
- Operator: South Eastern Railway
- Lines: Adra–Netaji S.C.Bose Gomoh branch line Bhojudih–Sudamdih link to the Railways in Jharia Coalfield
- Platforms: 2

Construction
- Structure type: Standard (on-ground station)
- Parking: Yes
- Cycle facilities: No

Other information
- Status: Functioning
- Station code: BJE
- Division(s): Adra

History
- Opened: 1907
- Electrified: 1965–66

Passengers
- 2000

Services
Preceding station	Indian Railways	Following station
Santaldih towards Adra	South Eastern Railway zone Adra–Netaji S.C.Bose Gomoh branch line	Shewbabudh towards Netaji Subhas Chandra Bose Gomoh
Terminus	South Eastern Railway zone Link to Railways in Jharia Coalfield	Sudamdih towards ?
Location
- Location within India Location within Jharkhand
- Interactive map of Bhojudih Junction

Bhojudih Junction is a railway station on the Adra–Netaji S.C.Bose Gomoh branch line, just south of the Damodar River and links to Sudamdih, north of the Damodar, and on the Railways in Jharia Coalfield. It is located in Bokaro district in the Indian state of Jharkhand. This Station is an important hub for freight train operation in South Eastern Railway. Proper examination and maintenance work of railway wagons are done at this station. Freight trains with good quality wagons are assemble here and dispatched to various sidings of Jharia Coalfield for loading and transportation of coal in various parts of India.

== History ==
The Bengal Nagpur Railway extended its then mainline, the Nagpur–Asansol line, to Netaji S.C.Bose Gomoh, on East Indian Railway's main line, in 1907. The Mohuda–Chandrapura branch line was opened in 1913. The Kharagpur–Gomoh section of BNR was opened up to Bhojudih in February 1903.

== Electrification ==
The Anara–Rukni–Santaldih and Santaldih–Pathardih–Sudamdih–Jamadoba sectors were electrified in 1965–66.

== Passenger movement ==
Bhojudih railway station serves around 2000 passengers every day.

== Inspectors Group of Bhojudih ==
Bhojudih Railway station is managed by a group ofsupervisors, popularly known as "Inspectors Group of Bhojudih". This Group includes the following members:- Ratan Sahay- Ch.DTI- Supervisor of Operating Department, C.M.Jha- Supervisor of Signal Department, Shishupal Ahirwar-Supervisor of Engineering Department, R.K.Jha- Supervisor of Traction Department, Arup Basu- Supervisor of Wagon repair and maintenance Department, S.Dutta- Officer In-charge of Railway Protection Force, S.Mudi-Supervisor of Works Department, Rajiv Kumar- Supervisor of Telecom Department, Dipak Maji- Supervisor of Electric Department.
