= Barabhum railway station =

Railway station in West Bengal, India

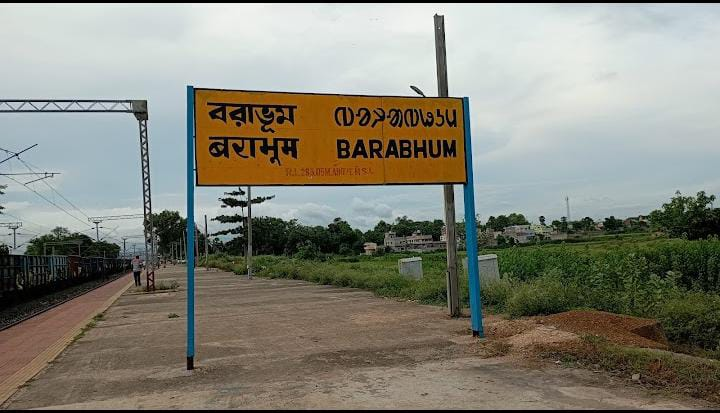

General information
- Location: Baghmundi Road, Balarampur, Rangadih, Purulia district, West Bengal; India
- Coordinates: 23°05′29″N 86°12′40″E
- Elevation: 286 metres (938 ft)
- System: Indian Railway
- Line: Asansol–Tatanagar–Kharagpur line
- Platforms: 2
- Tracks: 2

Construction
- Structure type: At Ground
- Parking: Available

Other information
- Station code: BBM
- Zone(s): South Eastern Railway
- Division(s): Adra

History
- Opened: 1890
- Electrified: 1961–62
- Former names: Bengal Nagpur Railway

Services
Preceding station	Indian Railways	Following station
Urma towards Purulia Junction	South Eastern Railway zone Purulia–Tatanagar line	Biramdih towards Tatanagar Junction
Location

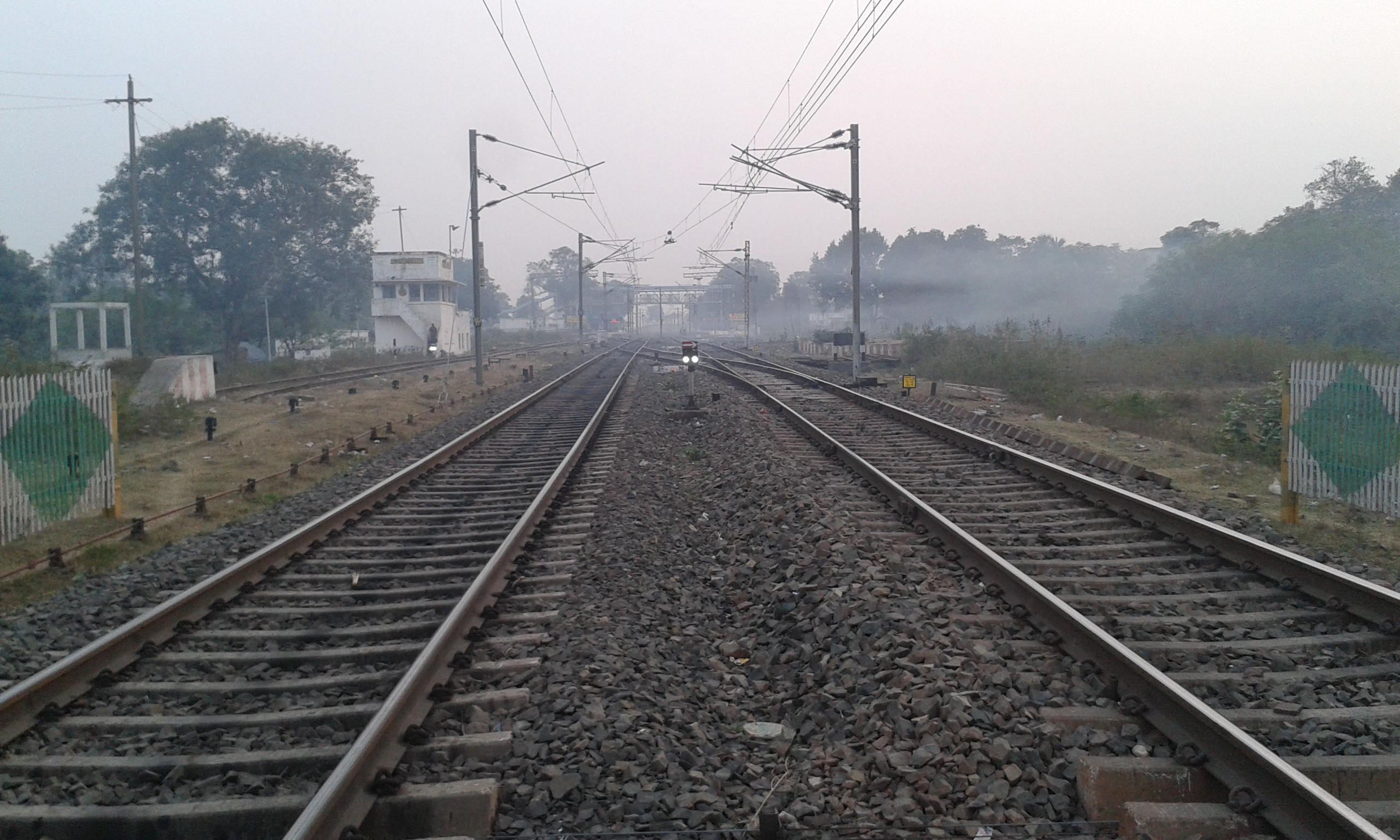
Railway track in Barabhum, Purulia

Barabhum railway station is a railway station on Purulia–Tatanagar line of Adra railway division of Indian Railways' South Eastern Railway zone. It is situated beside Baghmundi Road, Balarampur at Rangadih in Purulia district in the Indian state of West Bengal. This railway station serves Balarampur CD Block and Baghmundi area. Total 30 trains including number of Express and passenger trains stop at Barabhum railway station.

== History ==
The Bengal Nagpur Railway was formed in 1887 for the purpose of upgrading the Nagpur Chhattisgarh Railway. Purulia–Chakradharpur rail line was opened on 22 January 1890. The Purulia–Chakradharpur route including Barabhum railway station was electrified in 1961–62.
