= Kantadih railway station =

Railway station in West Bengal, India

General information
- Location: National Highway 32, Kantadi, Purulia district, West Bengal; India
- Coordinates: 23°13′06″N 86°17′47″E
- Elevation: 274 metres (899 ft)
- System: Indian Railway
- Line: Asansol–Tatanagar–Kharagpur line
- Platforms: 4
- Tracks: 2

Construction
- Structure type: At Ground
- Parking: Available

Other information
- Station code: KTD
- Zone(s): South Eastern Railway
- Division(s): Adra

History
- Opened: 1890
- Electrified: 1961–62
- Former names: Bengal Nagpur Railway

Services
Preceding station	Indian Railways	Following station
Tamna towards Purulia Junction	South Eastern Railway zone Purulia–Tatanagar line	Urma towards Tatanagar Junction
Location

Kantadih railway station is a railway station on Purulia–Tatanagar line of Adra railway division of Indian Railways' South Eastern Railway zone. It is situated beside National Highway 32 at Kantadi in Purulia district in the Indian state of West Bengal. Number of local and passenger train stop at Kantadih railway station.

== History ==
The Bengal Nagpur Railway was formed in 1887 for the purpose of upgrading the Nagpur Chhattisgarh Railway. Purulia–Chakradharpur rail line was opened on 22 January 1890. The Purulia–Chakradharpur rout including Kantadih railway station was electrified in 1961–62.
