= Chandil Junction railway station =

Station in Jharkhand, India

CHANDIL JUNCTION
- Indian Railways logo

General information
- Location: Chandil, Seraikela Kharsawan district, Jharkhand; India
- Coordinates: 22°57′19″N 86°04′14″E
- Elevation: 246 metres (807 ft)
- System: Indian Railways junction station
- Owner: Indian Railways
- Operator: South Eastern Railway
- Lines: Asansol–Tatanagar–Kharagpur line, Chandil–Barkakana line
- Platforms: 4

Construction
- Structure type: At Ground
- Parking: Available

Other information
- Station code: CNI
- Zone(s): South Eastern Railway
- Division(s): Adra
- Classification: NSG-5

History
- Opened: 1890; 136 years ago
- Electrified: 1961–62
- Former names: Bengal Nagpur Railway
Services
Preceding station	Indian Railways	Following station
Manikul towards ?	South Eastern Railway zone Asansol–Tatanagar–Kharagpur line	Nimdih towards ?
Terminus	South Eastern Railway zone Chandil–Barkakana line	Goonda Bihar towards ?
Route map
Location
- Location within Jharkhand Location within India
- Interactive map of Chandil Junction

Chandil Junction is a railway station which serves Chandil in Seraikela Kharsawan district in the Indian state of Jharkhand.

== History ==
The Bengal Nagpur Railway was formed in 1887 for the purpose of upgrading the Nagpur Chhattisgarh Railway and then extending it via Bilaspur to Asansol, in order to develop a shorter Howrah–Mumbai route than the one via Allahabad. The Bengal Nagpur Railway main line from Nagpur to Asansol, on the Howrah–Delhi main line, was opened for goods traffic on 1 February 1891.

The Chandil–Barkakana line was opened for traffic in 1927.

== Electrification ==
The Purulia–Chakradharpur, Kandra–Gomharria, Sini–Adityapur, Adityapur–Tatanagar, Chakradharpur–Manoharpur and Manoharpur–Rourkela sections were electrified in 1961–62.
