= Sudamdih =

- Neighbourhood in Dhanbad
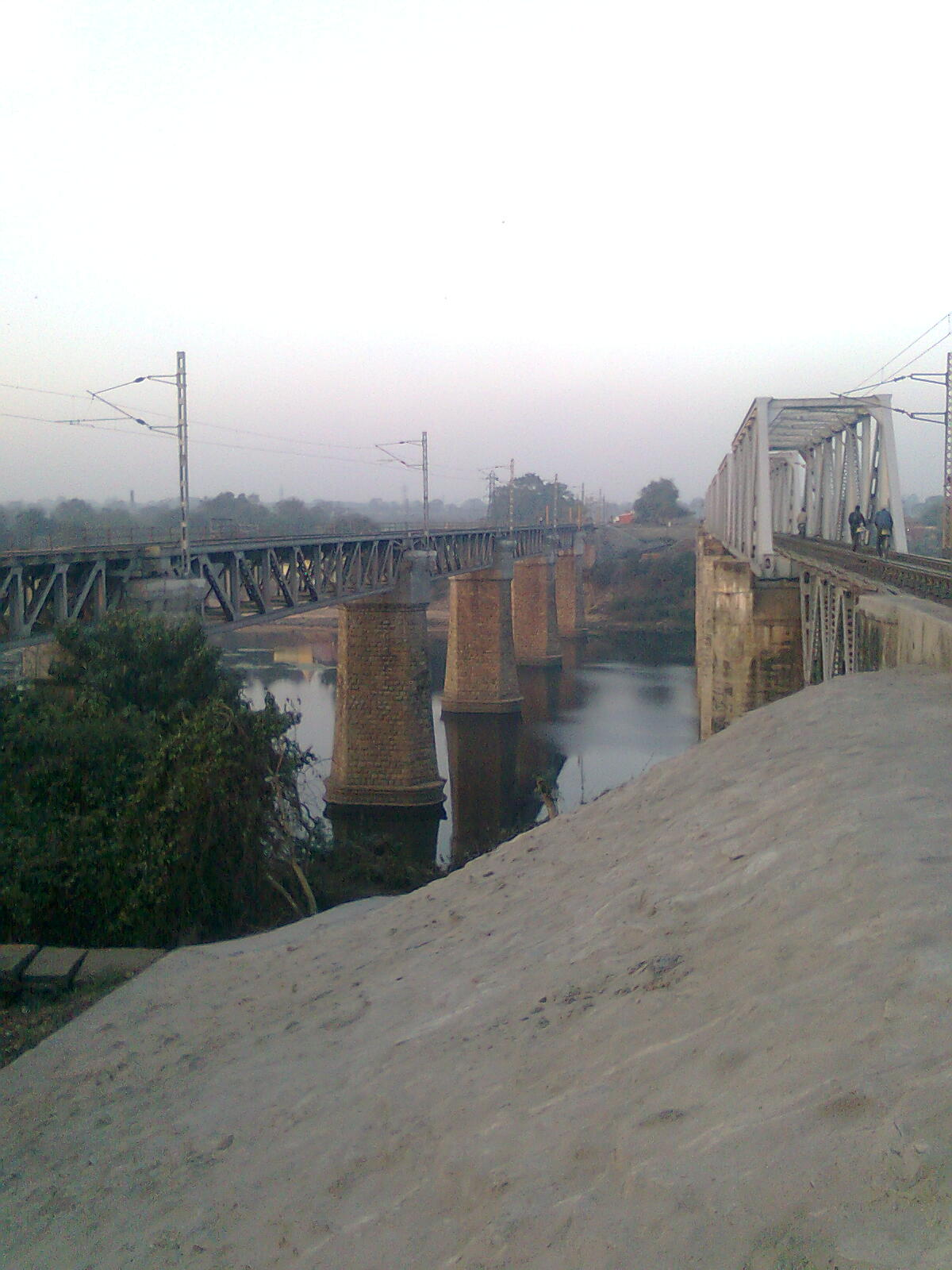

- Location within Jharkhand Location within India
- Coordinates: 23.6545°N 86.4406°E
- Country: India
- State: Jharkhand
- District: Dhanbad
- Subdistrict: Jharia
- Time zone: UTC+05:30 (IST)
- Pincode: 828126
- Website: dhanbad.nic.in

Sudamdih is a neighbourhood in Dhanbad in Dhanbad Sadar subdivision of Dhanbad district in Jharkhand state, India.

== Geography ==
Cities, towns and locations in the southern portion of Dhanbad Sadar subdivision in Dhanbad district
MC: Municipal Corporation, CT: Census Town, N: Neighbourhood, R: Rural/ Urban centre
Owing to space constraints in the small map, the actual locations in a larger map may vary slightly

=== Location ===
Sudamdih is located at 22.65722°N 86.43536°E. Its average elevation is 146.8 m (482 ft) above Sea level.

Note: The map alongside presents some of the notable locations in the area. All places marked in the map are linked in the larger full screen map.

Sudamdih was combined with other urban units to form Dhanbad Municipal Corporation in 2006. Sudamdih is part of Ward No. 51 of Dhanbad Municipal Corporation.

It is 18 km from Dhanbad, 5 km from Sindri, 7 km from Bhaga, 31 km from Adra, 200 km from Khargapur, 212 km from Tatanagar.

It is a developing town which comes under Bharat Cooking Coal Limited's Urban Project. The Damodar River flows along Sudamdih village and divides it from Bokaro.

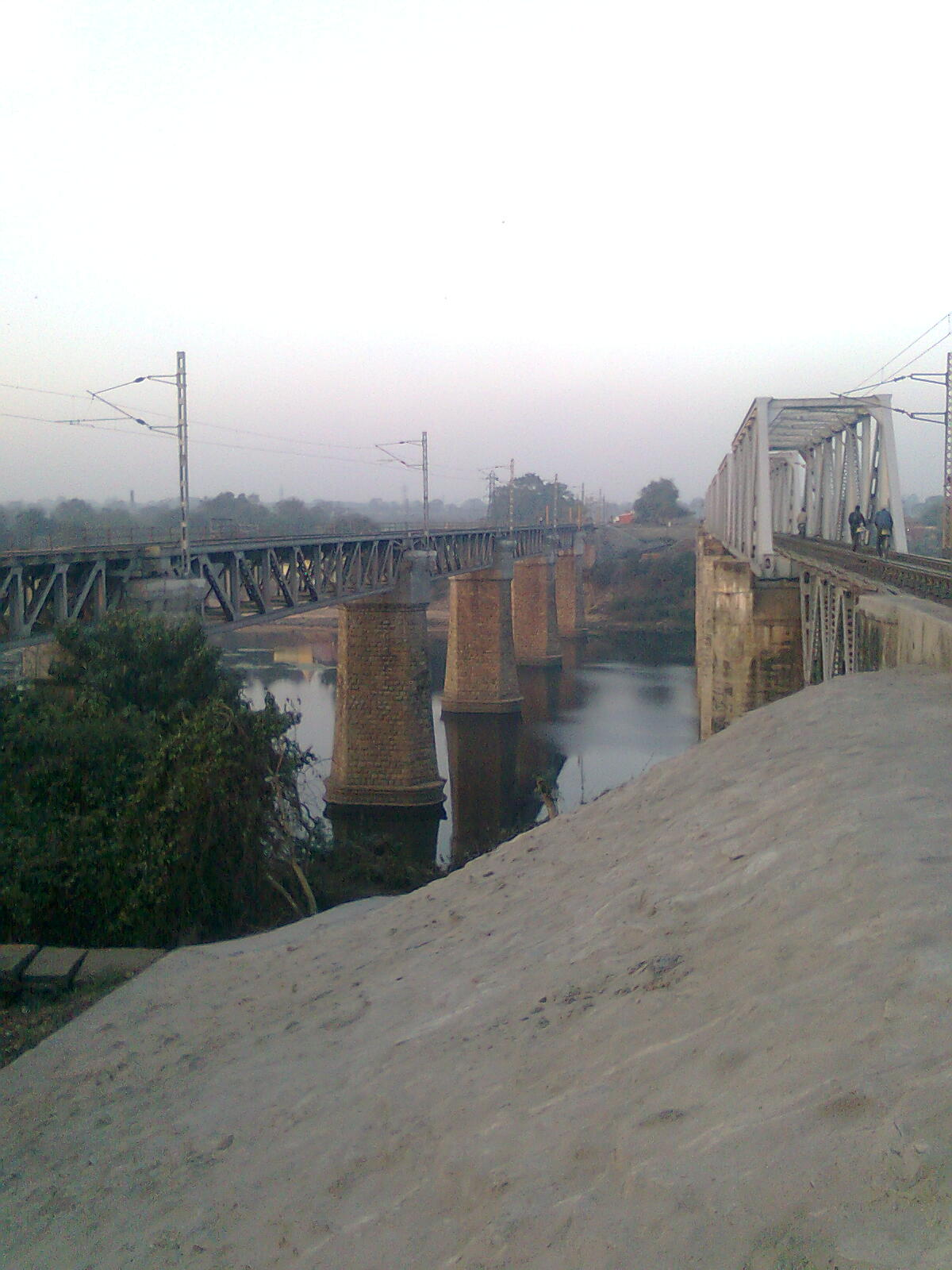
View of Damodar Bridge

=== Overview ===
The region shown in the map is a part of the undulating uplands bustling with coalmines. The Damodar River, the most important river of the Chota Nagpur Plateau, flows along the southern border. A major part of the area shown in the map is part of Dhanbad Municipal Corporation, an urban area. The places in the DMC area are marked as neighbourhoods. The western part of the region shown in the map is covered by Dhanbad (community development block). 57% of the population of Dhanbad CD block reside in rural areas and 43% reside in urban areas, The east-central part of the region shown in the map is covered by Baliapur (community development block). 86% of the population of Baliapur CD block reside in rural areas and 14% reside in urban areas. The places in the CD block areas are marked mostly as census towns. Three operational areas of BCCL operate fully within the region – Pootkee Balihari Area, Lodna Area and Eastern Jharia Area. The Moonidih sector of Western Jharia Area also operates in the region.

=== Police station ===
Sudamdih police station serves Jharia CD Block.

== Economy ==
=== Coal mines ===
Various projects have been going on for utilization of coal which is present in huge amount in Dhanbad. Bharat Coking Coal Limited (BCCL) is a subsidiary of Coal India Limited with its headquarters in Dhanbad, works the Sudamdih coal mines since nationalization of coalmines in 1971. It is a more than a century old underground shaft mine and washery.

Collieries in the Eastern Jharia Area of BCCL are: Bhowrah North underground mine, Bhowra South colliery, Sudamdih Inclined Mine, Sudamdih Shaft Mine, Pathardih Colliery and Amlabad colliery/ project. East Jharia Area has a reserve of 508.493 million tonnes.

About 17.85 hectares of East Jharia Area are affected by fire and subsidence, because of primitive methods of mining at shallow depths in the pre-nationalization era. All the quarries and subsidized areas affected by fire at Sudamdih and Pathardih have been filled up.

Mining has been going on in the underground mines in this area for about 100 years. Working conditions in these mines being amongst the most difficult in the world, good quality prime coking coal in the lower seams still remain untapped.

== Transport ==
Sudamdih railway station is on the Railways in Jharia Coalfield.

Trekkers and state buses are available, which connect Sudamdih to Jharia, Dhanbad, Bhaga and Sindri.
