= MHQ =

MHQ may refer to:

- MHQ: The Quarterly Journal of Military History, published by the Weider History Group
- Mahuda Junction railway station, a station in Jharkhand state
- Mariehamn Airport, IATA: MHQ
