= KTD =

KTD or ktd may refer to:

- Kai Tak Development, the redevelopment of the site of the former Kai Tak Airport in Kai Tak, Kowloon, Hong Kong
- Kwai Tsing District, a district of New Territories, Hong Kong
- Kwun Tong District, a district of Kowloon, Hong Kong
- KTD, the IATA airport code for Kitadaito Airport, Okinawa, Japan
- KTD, the Indian Railways station code for Kantadih railway station, West Bengal, India
- ktd, the ISO 639-3 code for the Kukarta language in Australia
