= Parvathipuram railway station =

Railway station in Andhra Pradesh, India

Parvatipuram
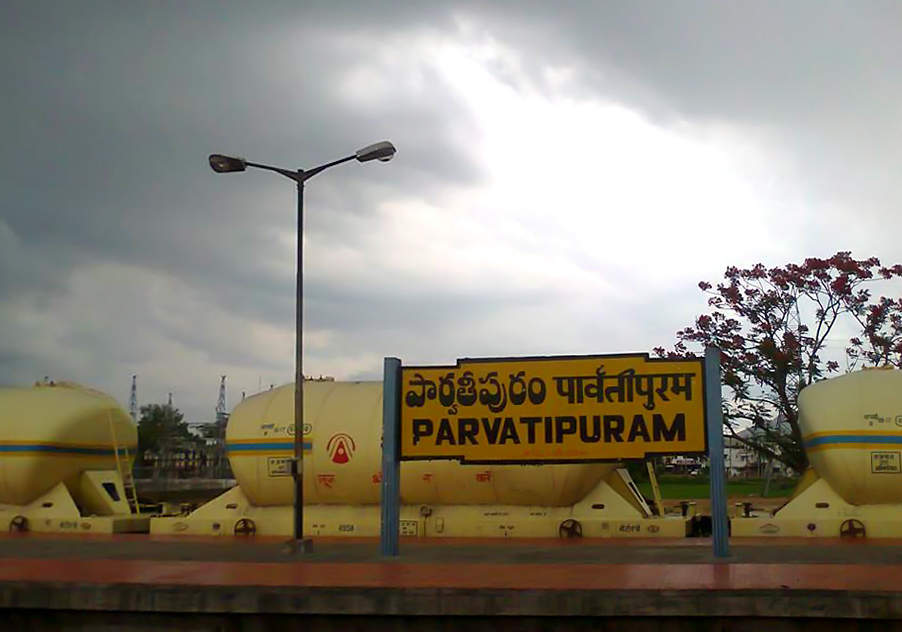
- Station board at Parvatipuram

General information
- Location: Parvathipuram, Andhra Pradesh; India
- Coordinates: 18°44′53″N 83°26′02″E
- Elevation: 120 m (394 ft)
- System: Indian Railways station
- Line: Raipur–Vizianagaram line
- Platforms: 5
- Tracks: 5 ft 6 in (1,676 mm) broad gauge

Construction
- Structure type: Standard (on-ground station)
- Parking: Available

Other information
- Status: Functioning
- Station code: PVP
- Zone(s): south Coast Railway
- Division(s): Visakhapatnam

History
- Opened: 1908–09
- Former names: Bengal Nagpur Railway

Services
Preceding station	Indian Railways	Following station
Parvathipuram Town towards ?	South Coast Railway zone Vizianagaram–Raipur line	Narsipuram towards ?
Location
- Location within Andhra Pradesh Location within India

Parvatipuram railway station (station code:PVP), located in the Indian state of Andhra Pradesh, serves Parvathipuram in Parvathipuram Manyam district. It is one of the two railway stations in Parvathipuram.

== History ==
Between 1893 and 1896, 1,288 km (800 mi) of the East Coast State Railway was opened for traffic. In 1898–99, Bengal Nagpur Railway was linked to the lines in southern India.

The 79 km (49 mi) Vizianagaram–Parvatipuram line was opened in 1908–09 and an extension to Salur was built in 1913. The Parvatipuram–Raipur line was completed in 1931.

== Railway reorganization ==
The Bengal Nagpur Railway was nationalized in 1944.Eastern Railway was formed on 14 April 1952 with the portion of East Indian Railway Company east of Mughalsarai and the Bengal Nagpur Railway. In 1955, South Eastern Railway was carved out of Eastern Railway. It comprised lines mostly operated by BNR earlier. Amongst the new zones started in April 2003 were East Coast Railway and South East Central Railway. Both these railways were carved out of South Eastern Railway. Platforms increased from three to five in April,2024.
