= Parvathipuram Town railway station =

Railway station in Andhra Pradesh, India

Parvathipuram Town
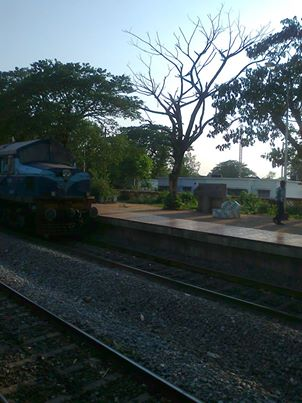

General information
- Location: Parvathipuram Manyam district, Andhra Pradesh; India
- Coordinates: 18°28′30″N 83°15′47″E
- System: Indian Railways station
- Owner: Indian Railways
- Operator: South Coast Railway
- Line: Jharsuguda–Vizianagaram line
- Platforms: 2
- Tracks: 2
- Connections: Auto service, nearby Parvathipuram bus station

Construction
- Parking: Available

Other information
- Status: Functioning
- Station code: PVPT
- Zone(s): South Coast Railway
- Division(s): Visakhapatnam

History
- Opened: 1908–09
- Former names: Bengal Nagpur Railway

Services
Preceding station	Indian Railways	Following station
Gumada towards ?	South Coast Railway zone Vizianagaram–Raipur line	Parvathipuram towards ?
Location
- Location within Andhra Pradesh Location within India

Parvatipuram Town railway station (station code:PVPT) is an Indian railway station that serves Parvathipuram town in Parvathipuram Manyam district.

== History ==
Between 1893 and 1896, 1,288 km (800 mi) of the East Coast State Railway was opened for traffic. In 1898–99, Bengal Nagpur Railway was linked to the lines in southern India.

The 79 km (49 mi) Vizianagaram–Parvatipuram line was opened in 1908–09 and an extension to Salur was built in 1913. The Parvatipuram–Raipur line was completed in 1931.

== Railway reorganization ==
The Bengal Nagpur Railway was nationalized in 1944.Eastern Railway was formed on 14 April 1952 with the portion of East Indian Railway Company east of Mughalsarai and the Bengal Nagpur Railway. In 1955, South Eastern Railway was carved out of Eastern Railway. It comprised lines mostly operated by BNR earlier. New zones were started in April 2003 and then East Coast Railway and South East Central Railway were carved out from North Eastern Railway.

== Development of Parvathipuram railway station ==
Due to increase of Parvathipuram Town towards south. Parvathipuram railway station is being developed. From 2011 new express trains were given halt at Parvathipuram railway station excluding Parvathipuram Town railway station.
