= Mahuda Junction railway station =

Railway station in Jharkhand, India

MAHUDA JUNCTION

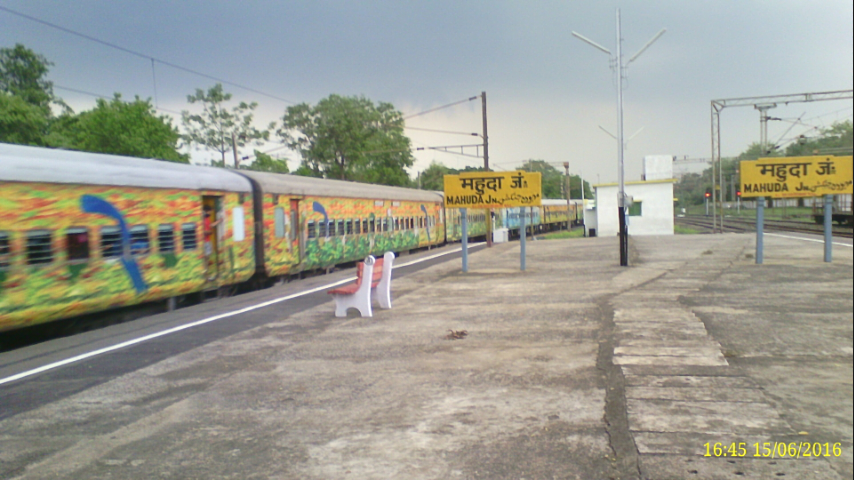
- Durunto passing through Mahuda Junction

General information
- Location: NH 18(NH 32), Mahuda, Dhanbad district, Jharkhand; India
- Coordinates: 23°44′51″N 86°16′13″E
- Elevation: 205.00 metres (672.57 ft)
- System: Regional rail and Light rail station
- Owner: Government of India
- Operator: Indian Railways
- Lines: Howrah–Kharagpur–Gomoh line Howrah–Kharagpur–Bokaro-Ranchi line Dhanbad–Mahuda–Chandrapura line Chandrapura-Mahuda-Talgaria-Bhojudih-Adra line Gomoh-Mahuda-Bhaga-Bhojudih-Adra line Gomoh-Mahuda-Talgaria-Bhojudih-Adra line Mahuda-Chas-Bokaro-Ranchi line
- Platforms: 2
- Tracks: 11

Construction
- Structure type: Standard
- Parking: Available

Other information
- Status: Functional
- Station code: MHQ
- Zone(s): South Eastern Railway zone
- Division(s): Adra

History
- Opened: 1907; 119 years ago
- Electrified: 1986; 40 years ago
- Former names: Mohuda

Passengers
- 30000+
Services
Preceding station	Indian Railways	Following station
Jamuniatand towards ?	South Eastern Railway zone Chandrapura–Mahuda–Bhojudih branch line	Talgoria towards ?
Khanudih towards ?	South Eastern Railway zone Gomoh–Bhaga branch line	Malkera JN towards ?
Route map
Location
- Location within India Location within Jharkhand Location within India
- Interactive map of Mahuda Junction

Mahuda Junction railway station is a railway station near NH 18 previously NH32, Mahuda Bazaar in Dhanbad district, Jharkhand state. It is operated by South Eastern Railway Adra division. Its code is MHQ. It is one of cleanest stations of Dhanbad despite its use for coal transportation. It is nearest to the Katras Baghmara and Dhanbad as it became the other substitute station for Dhanbad Junction. Ii is just 19 km from the area main junction. It is nearest to Bokaro Steel City. It is a good location both for Bokaro and Dhanbad. The important train is Bokaro Howrah Express (bksc-hwh). It is mainly in function for Washeries i.e. Mahuda, Moonidih . The direct trains for major city like Ranchi, Kharagpur, Howrah, New Delhi, Kanpur, Fatehpur, Allahabad, Bokaro, Adra, Gaya, Mughalsarai, Tatanagar

== History ==
The Bengal Nagpur Railway extended its then mainline, the Nagpur–Asansol line, to Netaji S.C.Bose Gomoh, on East Indian Railway's main line, in 1907. The Mohuda–Chandrapura branch line was opened in 1913.

== Electrification ==
The Bhaga–Mahuda and Mahuda–Gomoh and Mahuda–Chandrapura sectors were electrified in 1985–88.

== Passenger movement ==
Mahuda railway station serves around 70K passengers every month.

== Trains stop ==
Mail/Express

- 18627/28 Ranchi–Howrah Intercity Express
- 18013/14 Bokaro Steel City-Howrah Express
- 18115/16 Gomoh-Chakradharpur MEMU Express
- 18023/24 Gomoh-Kharagpur Express
- 15021/22 Gorakhpur-Shalimar Express
- 04085/86 Meerut City-Kharagpur Summer Special

Passenger train

- 58033/34 Bokaro Steel City–Ranchi Passenger(Runs with same coach of 18013/14)
- 68079/80 Bhojudih–Chandrapura MEMU
- 68071 Adra–Khanudih MEMU
- 68074 Khanudih–Bhojudih MEMU
