= Parbatipur =

Parbatipur may refer to:

- Parbatipur, Bishnupur, South 24 Parganas district, West Bengal, India
- Parbatipur Upazila, Bangladesh
- Parbatipur Junction railway station, Bangladesh
- Parbatipur, Nepal, Chitwan district, Nepal

== See also ==
- Parvathipuram (disambiguation)
