= Railways in Jharia Coalfield =

Series of railway lines

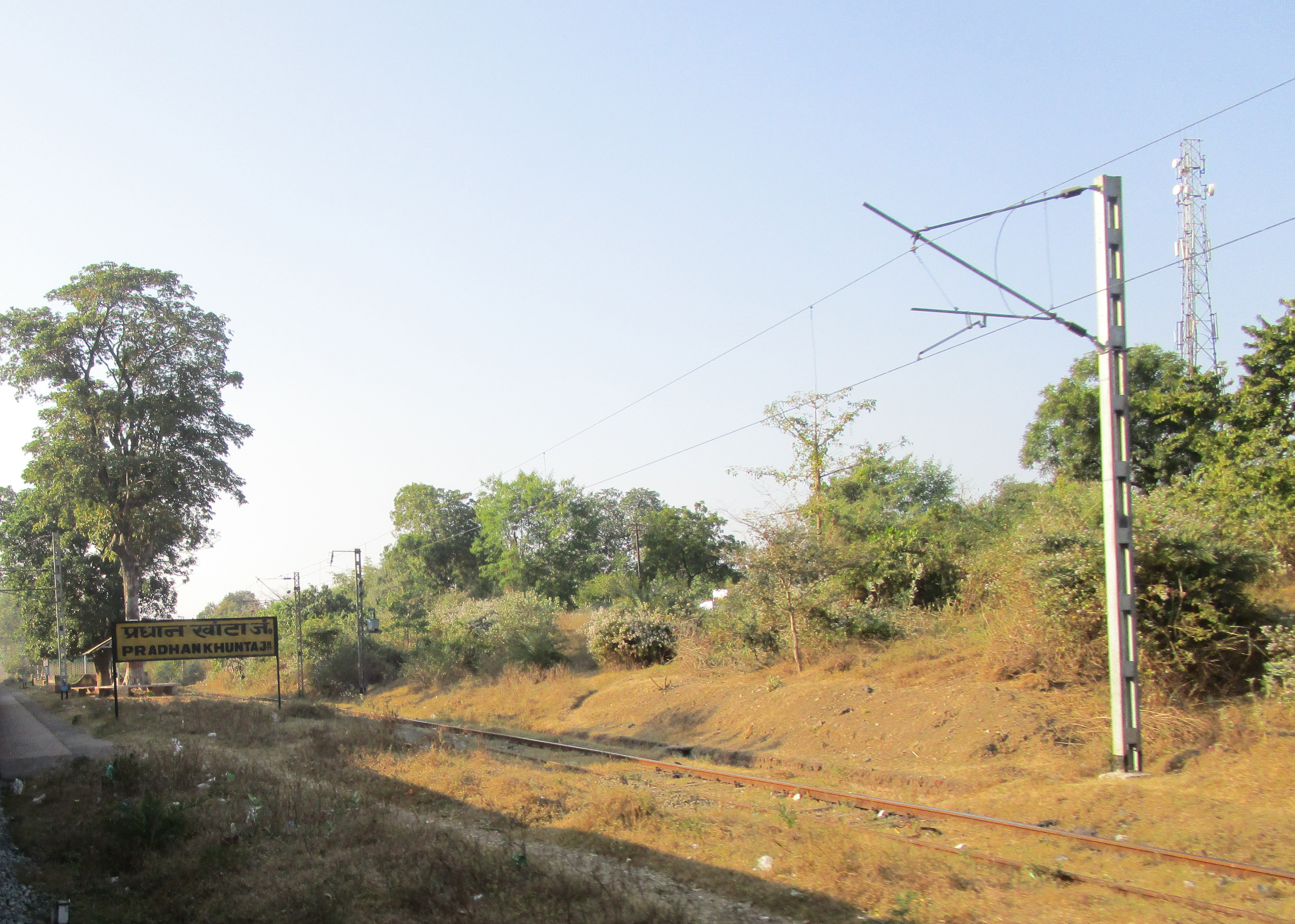
- Pradhan Khunta Junction an important railway station on Jharia Coalfield Railways area

Overview
- Status: Operational
- Owner: Indian Railways
- Locale: Jharia Coalfield, Jharkhand

Service
- Operator(s): East Central Railway, South Eastern Railway

History
- Opened: 1894

Technical
- Track gauge: 5 ft 6 in (1,676 mm) broad gauge
- Electrification: 1960–61 onwards with 25 kV AC overhead

Jharia Coalfield has a series of railway lines covering the region lying between the Grand Chord line on the north and the Damodar river in the south. It consists of five lines of which four are managed by East Central Railway's Dhanbad railway division and one is managed by the South Eastern Railway's Adra railway division.

== History ==
It was possible to develop mining in the Jharia Coalfield in the late nineteenth century primarily because of the introduction of railways. East Indian Railway Company extended the Grand Chord to Katrasgarh via Dhanbad in 1894.

The Bengal Nagpur Railway extended its then mainline, the Nagpur–Asansol line, to Netaji SC Bose Gomoh, on EIR’s Grand Chord, in 1907. The Mahuda Junction–Chandrapura branch line was opened in 1913.

The District Gazetteer of Manbhum noted that: "There is a network of railway line in this district passing through colliery area. Grand Chord Line of the Eastern Railway and branch line of South Eastern Railway pass through this district from Gomoh Junction two railway line one of the Eastern Railway and another of the south Eastern Railway branch off, one going to Dehri on Sone (Shahabad) via Barkakana and another from Gomoh to Adra (Purulia district). There are branch lines in both the railway for carrying coal to different places in the country."

EIR had four major sections:

- Kumardhubi–Gomoh section
- Pradhankhanta–Pathardih section (15 km), opened in 1913
- Dhanbad–Phularitand section (21.6 km), opened in 1894 to Katrasgarh and extended to Phularitand in 1924
- Dhanbad–Jharia-Pathardih section opened in 1903.

BNR had one section from Sudamdih to Gomoh.

== Sections ==
Apart from the numerous loop lines which serve the various collieries in the area, there are 5 major sections:

1. Dhanbad–N.S.C. Bose Gomoh line (part of the Asansol–Gaya section of the Grand Chord)
2. Dhanbad–Chandrapura line
3. Dhanbad–Jharia–Pathardih line (now dismantled due to underground fires)
4. Pradhankhunta–Sindri Town branch line
5. Sudamdih–N.S.C Bose Gomoh section of the Adra–N.S.C. Bose Gomoh line

== Electrification ==
Electrification of the stretch of mainline of this section from Asansol to Netaji SC Bose Gomoh was completed in 1960–61.

Stretches of railway track in the Jharia Coalfield were electrified from time to time. Dhanbad–Kusunda–Tetulmari was electrified in 1961-62. The Santaldih–Pathardih–Sudamdih–Jamadoba sector was electrified in 1965-66. The Bhojudih–Netaji SC Bose Gomoh stretch was electrified in 1985–86. The Netaji SC Bose Gomoh–Chandrapura–Bhandaridah–Rajabera sector was electrified in 1986–87. The Chandrapura–Jamuniatanr–Mahuda sector was electrified in 1986–87. The Tupkadih–Talgoria sector was electrified in 1987–88.
