= Pathardih =

- Neighbourhood in Dhanbad
- Location in Jharkhand, India Pathardih (India)
- Coordinates: 23.67°N 86.43°E
- Country: India
- State: Jharkhand
- District: Dhanbad
- Founder: BK Sharma

Government
  - Type: B.C.C.l
- Elevation: 143 m (469 ft)

Population (2001)
  - Total: 39,527

Languages
  - Official: Hindi, Urdu
- Time zone: UTC+5:30 (IST)
- 828126: 828126
- Vehicle registration: JH
- Website: dhanbad.nic.in

Pathardih is a neighbourhood in Dhanbad in Dhanbad Sadar subdivision of Dhanbad district in Jharkhand state, India.

== Geography ==
Cities, towns and locations in the southern portion of Dhanbad Sadar subdivision in Dhanbad district
MC: Municipal Corporation, CT: Census Town, N: Neighbourhood, R: Rural/ Urban centre
Owing to space constraints in the small map, the actual locations in a larger map may vary slightly

=== Location ===
Pathardih is located at 23.67°N 86.43°E. It has an average elevation of 143 metres (469 feet).

Note: The map alongside presents some of the notable locations in the area. All places marked in the map are linked in the larger full screen map.

The earlier census town was combined with other urban units to form Dhanbad Municipal Corporation in 2006.

Pathardih is part of Ward No. 50 of Dhanbad Municipal Corporation.

=== Overview ===
The region shown in the map is a part of the undulating uplands bustling with coalmines. The Damodar River, the most important river of the Chota Nagpur Plateau, flows along the southern border. A major part of the area shown in the map is part of Dhanbad Municipal Corporation, an urban area. The places in the DMC area are marked as neighbourhoods. The western part of the region shown in the map is covered by Dhanbad (community development block). 57% of the population of Dhanbad CD block reside in rural areas and 43% reside in urban areas, The east-central part of the region shown in the map is covered by Baliapur (community development block). 86% of the population of Baliapur CD block reside in rural areas and 14% reside in urban areas. The places in the CD block areas are marked mostly as census towns. Three operational areas of BCCL operate fully within the region – Pootkee Balihari Area, Lodna Area and Eastern Jharia Area. The Moonidih sector of Western Jharia Area also operates in the region.

=== Police station ===
Pathardih police station serves Jharia CD Block.

== Demographics ==
As of 2001 India census, Pathardih had a population of 39,527. Males constitute 55% of the population and females 45%. Pathardih has an average literacy rate of 66%, higher than the national average of 59.5%: male literacy is 76%, and female literacy is 54%. In Pathardih, 13% of the population is under 6 years of age.

== Economy ==
Collieries in the Eastern Jharia Area of BCCL are: Bhowrah North underground mine, Bhowra South colliery, Sudamdih Incline Mine, Sudamdih Shaft Mine, Patherdih Colliery and Amlabad colliery/ project. Eastern Jharia Area has a reserve of 508.493 million tonnes.

About 17.85 hectares of East Jharia Area are affected by fire and subsidence, because of primitive methods of mining at shallow depths in the pre-nationalization era. All the quarries and subsidized areas affected by fire at Sudamdih and Pathardih have been filled up.

Mining has been carried out in the underground mines in this area for about 100 years. Working conditions in the mines are difficult, and prime coking coal in the lower seams remains unmined.

== Healthcare ==
In addition to the 100-bedded Jealgora Regional Hospital and 10-bedded units at Bhowrah and Sudamdih, BCCL has an Ayurvedic dispensary at Pathardih.
