= Parvathipuram, Andhra Pradesh =

Parvathipuram
- District Headquarter; Municipal Town
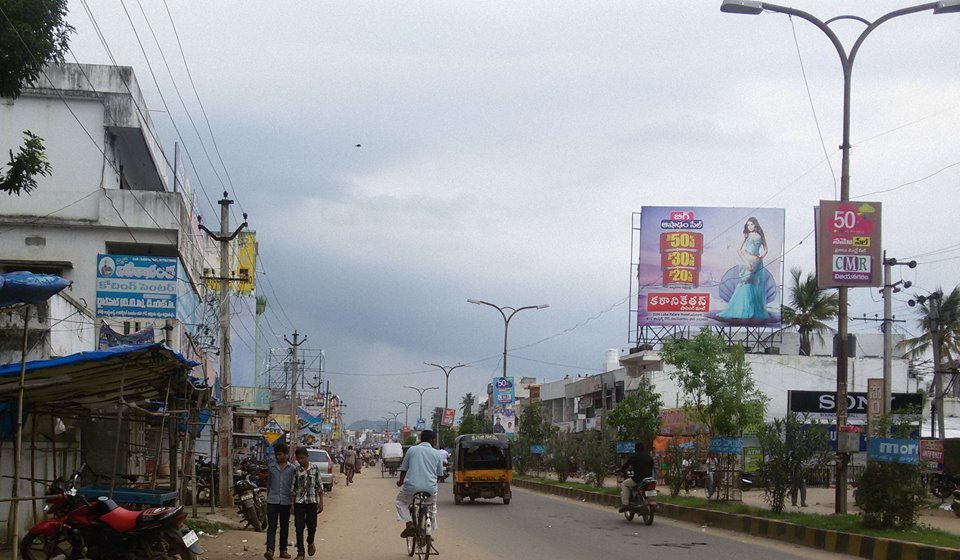
- Main road in Parvathipuram

- Location in Andhra Pradesh, India Parvathipuram (India)
- Coordinates: 18.78°N 83.425°E
- Country: India
- State: Andhra Pradesh
- District: Parvathpuram Manyam

Government
  - Type: Municipality
  - Body: Parvathipuram Municipality, BUDA
  - MLA: Bonela Vijaya Chandra

Area
  - Total: 11.24 km^{2} (4.34 sq mi)

Population (2011)
  - Total: 53,844
  - Density: 4,790/km^{2} (12,410/sq mi)

Language
  - Official: Telugu
- Time zone: UTC+5:30 (IST)
- PIN: 535 501
- Telephone code: 91–8963
- Vehicle Registration: AP35 (Former); AP39 (from 30 January 2019)
- Website: Parvathipuram Municipality

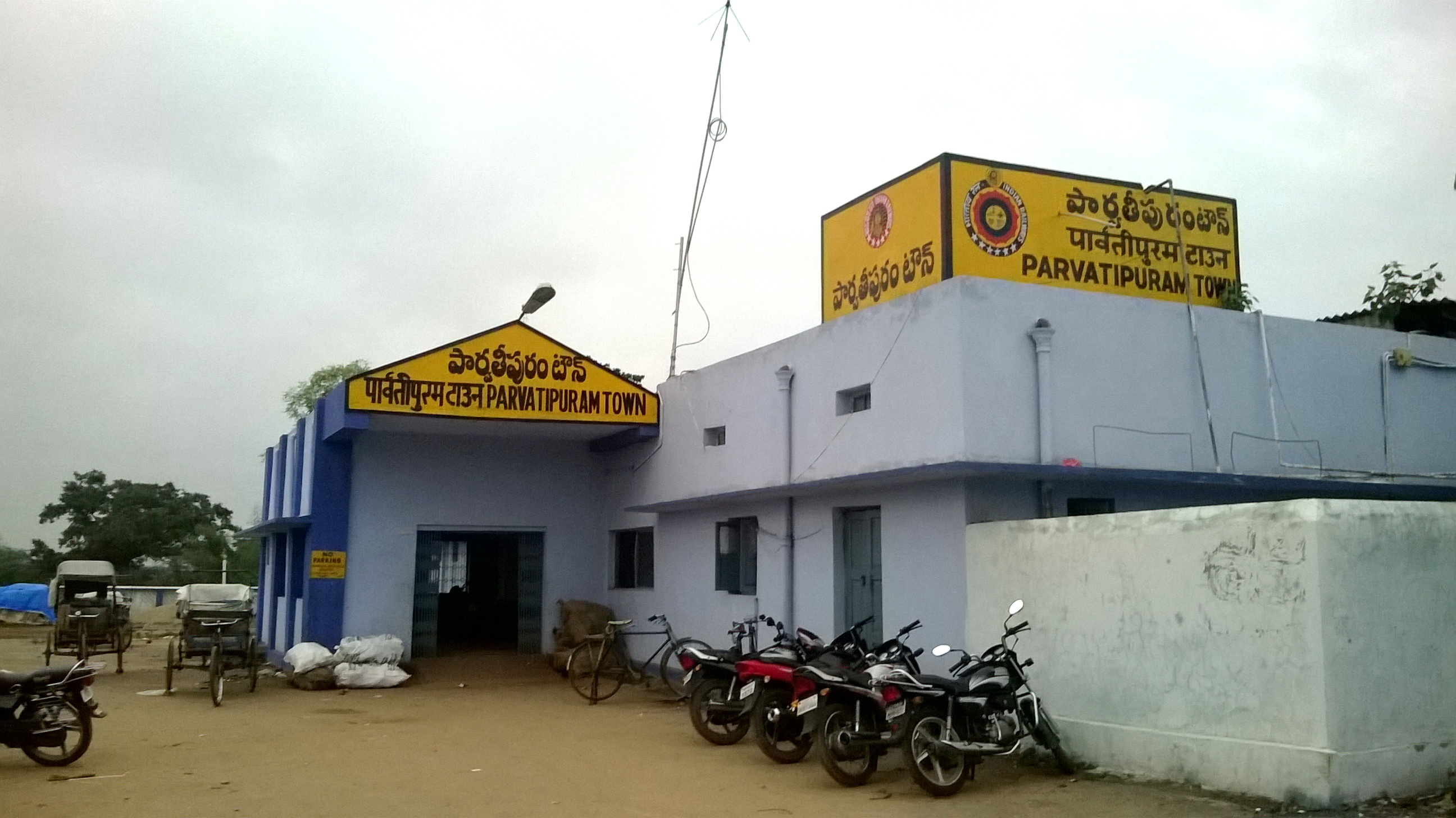
Parvathipuram Town railway station

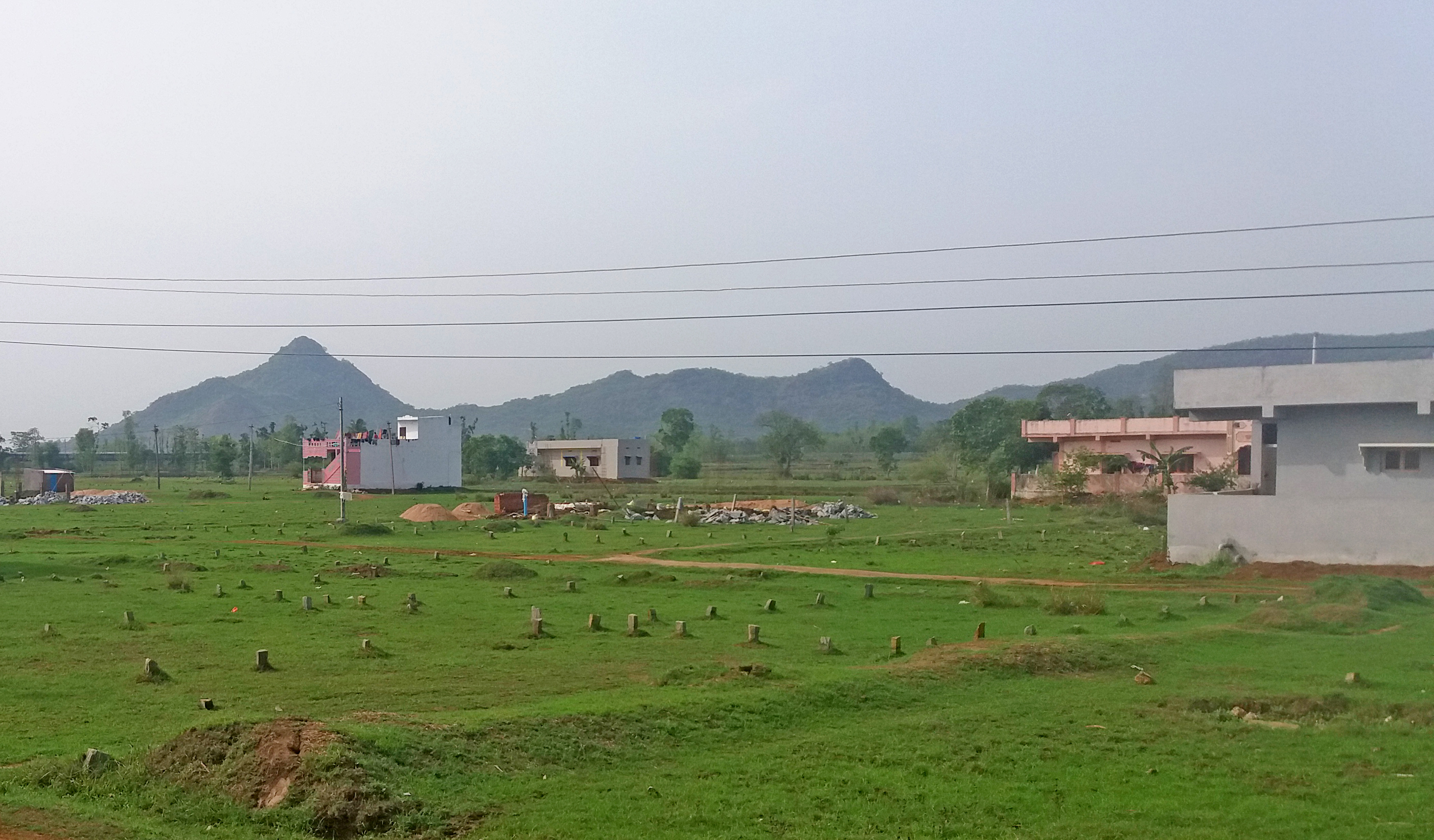
A view of Eastern Ghats near Parvathipuram

Parvathipuram is a municipality located at Parvathipuram Manyam district of Indian state of Andhra Pradesh. It is the administrative headquarters of Parvathipuram Manyam district and headquarters of Parvathipuram revenue division and Parvathipuram mandal. This revenue division shares a border with various districts in Odisha.

== Geography ==
Parvathipuram is located at 18°46'N 83°25'E. It has an average elevation of 120 meters (393.7 feet).

== Demographics ==
As of 2011 census, Parvathipuram had a population of 53,844. The total population constitute, 26,811 males and 27,033 females a sex ratio of 1008 females per 1000 males. 5,048 children are in the age group of 0–6 years, of which 2,607 are boys and 2,441 are girls a ratio of 936 per 1000. The average literacy rate stands at 79.14% with 38,618 literates, significantly higher than the state average of 67.41%.

== Government and politics ==
Parvathipuram is represented by Parvathipuram (SC) (Assembly constituency) for Andhra Pradesh Legislative Assembly and Araku (Lok Sabha constituency). Bonela Vijaya Chandra is the present MLA of the constituency representing Telugu Desam Party

== Transport ==
=== Train Transport ===
Parvathipuram is on the Jharsuguda–Vizianagaram line. There are two railway stations Parvathipuram and Parvathipuram Town within 1 kilometre (0.62 mi).

- Station Codes
- Parvathipuram railway station - (PVP)
- Parvathipuram Town railway station - (PVPT)

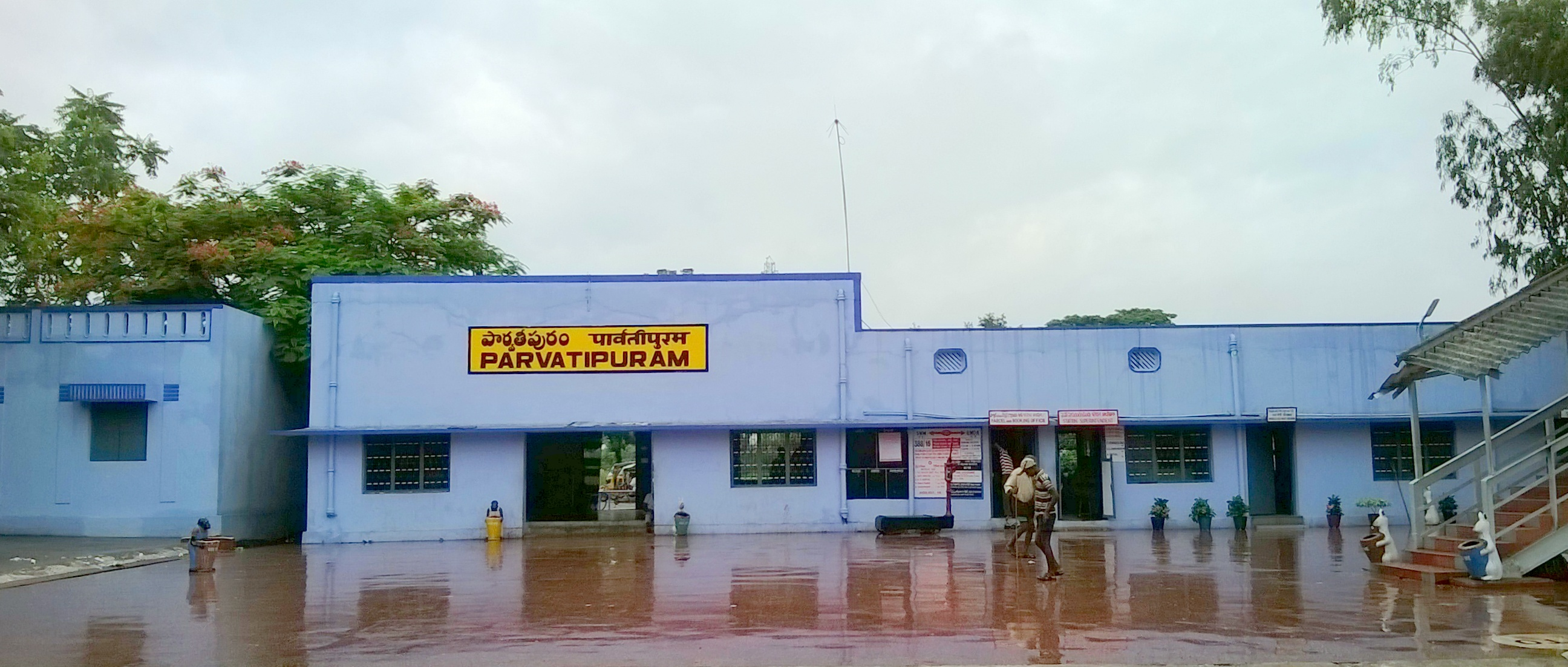
Parvathipuram railway station

=== Road Transport ===
There is Road connectivity between Major towns of Andhra pradesh and Odisha to Parvathipuram. APSRTC is Providing Daily Bus facility to Vijayawada and other major cities Visakhapatnam, Vizianagaram, Rajahmundry, Srikakulam, Kakinada of Andhrapradesh and Various Places of Odisha.

=== Air Transport ===
The Nearest Airport is located in Visakhapatnam which is 150 km away from Parvathipuram.

== Tourism Attractions ==
Parvathipuram has many tourist attractions are around and inside the town.

=== Devotional ===
Many Temples are Located around Parvathipuram area Kasi Viswanath temple Addapusila is the oldest historic temple which is located 5 km away from Parvathipuram town.

Sri Venkateswara Swamy Temple, Thotapalli is most popularly known as Chinna Tirupathi is famous for Lord Balaji; many pilgrims visit this temple from various states.

St. Paul's Lutheran Church is one of the oldest church in Parvathipuram area which was built in 1888. It is located at Main road Belagam and also a Roman Catholic church is also another attraction in this area.

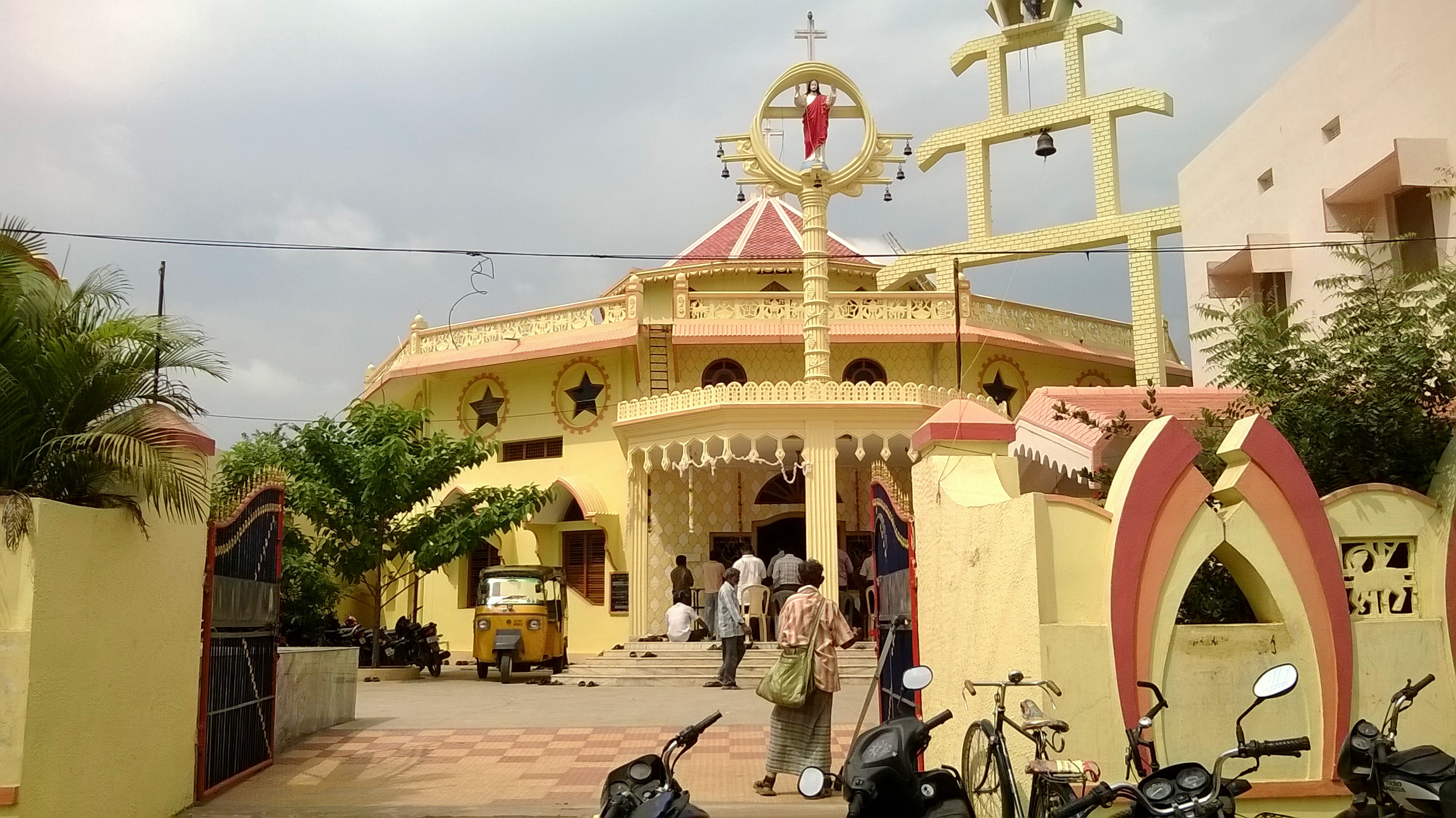
Catholic church Parvathipuram

=== Dams and Reservoirs ===
- Janjavathi Rubber Dam/VKM Rubber Dam is located 15 km away from Parvathipuram which is Asia's first rubber dam. The dam is the first one to be completed as part of the ambitious Jalayagnam launched by the Government of Andhrapradesh in 2006.
- Thotapalli reservoir is the largest dam in Parvathipuram revenue division which was built on Nagavali River. This project is the brain child of Chandra Babu Naidu. He laid foundation as CM in 2003 and completed the project as a CM in 2015. Thotapalli Reservoir area is mostly attracting for sightseeing and boating.

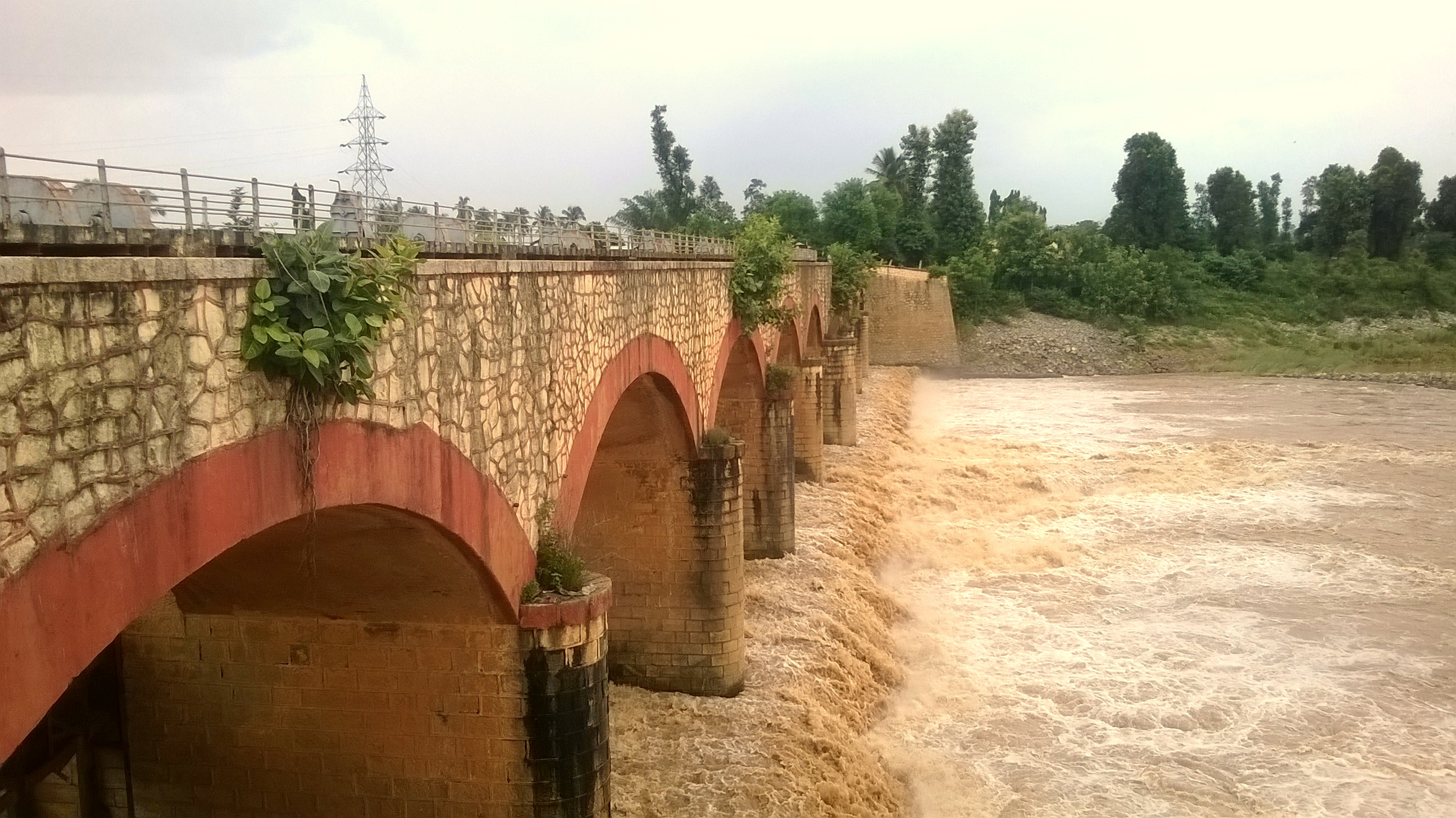
Thotapalli old Bridge

== Entertainment ==
=== Cinemas ===
- Soundharya
- Padma sri picture palace
- TBR Cinemas
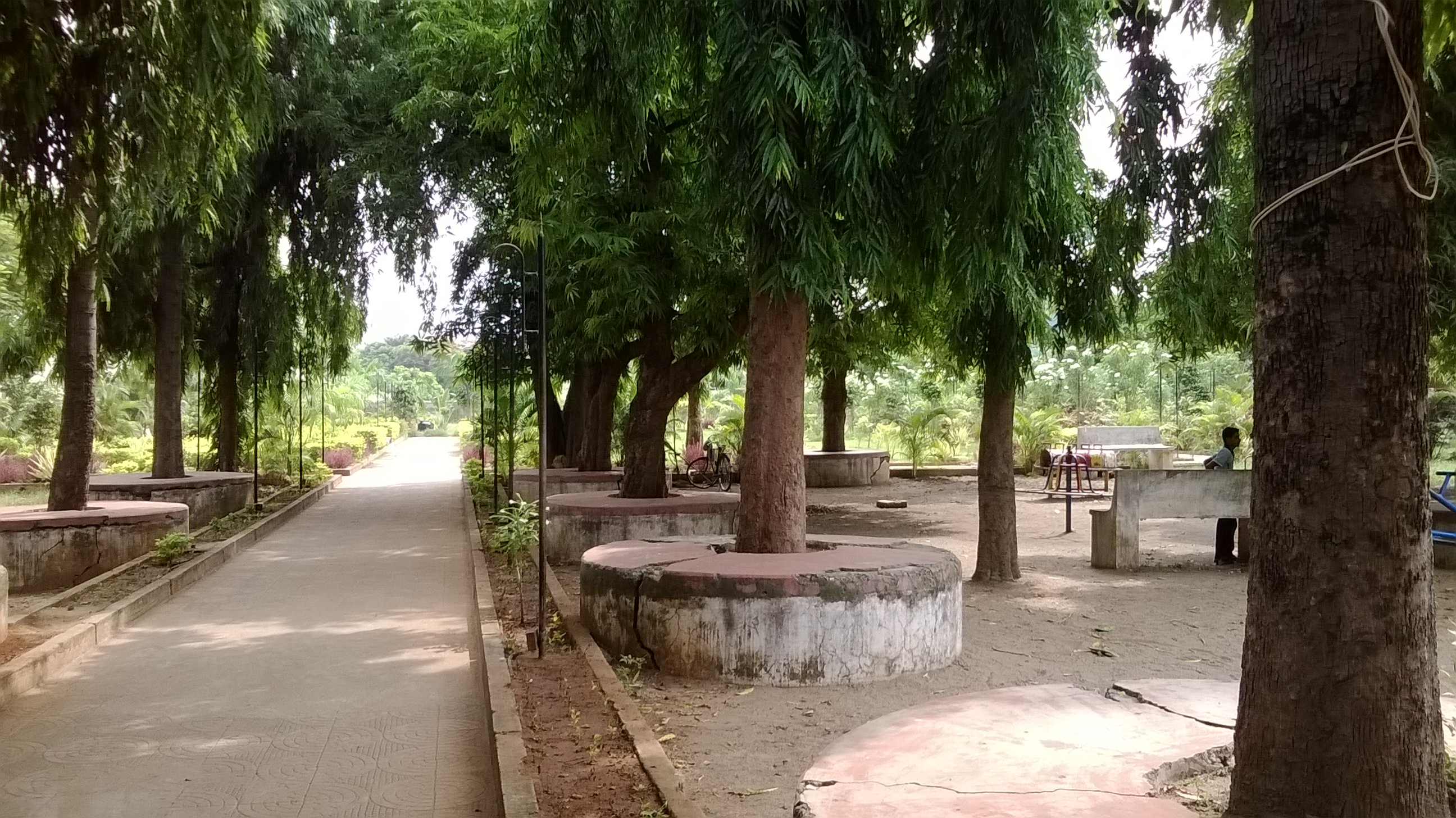
  Dr Sanyasi Raju Municipal Park

=== Parks ===
- Dr Sanyasi Raju Municipal Park, Church street
- Jurassic Children Park, Police Quarters
- Railway Park, Belagam
- ITDA Park, Thotapalli

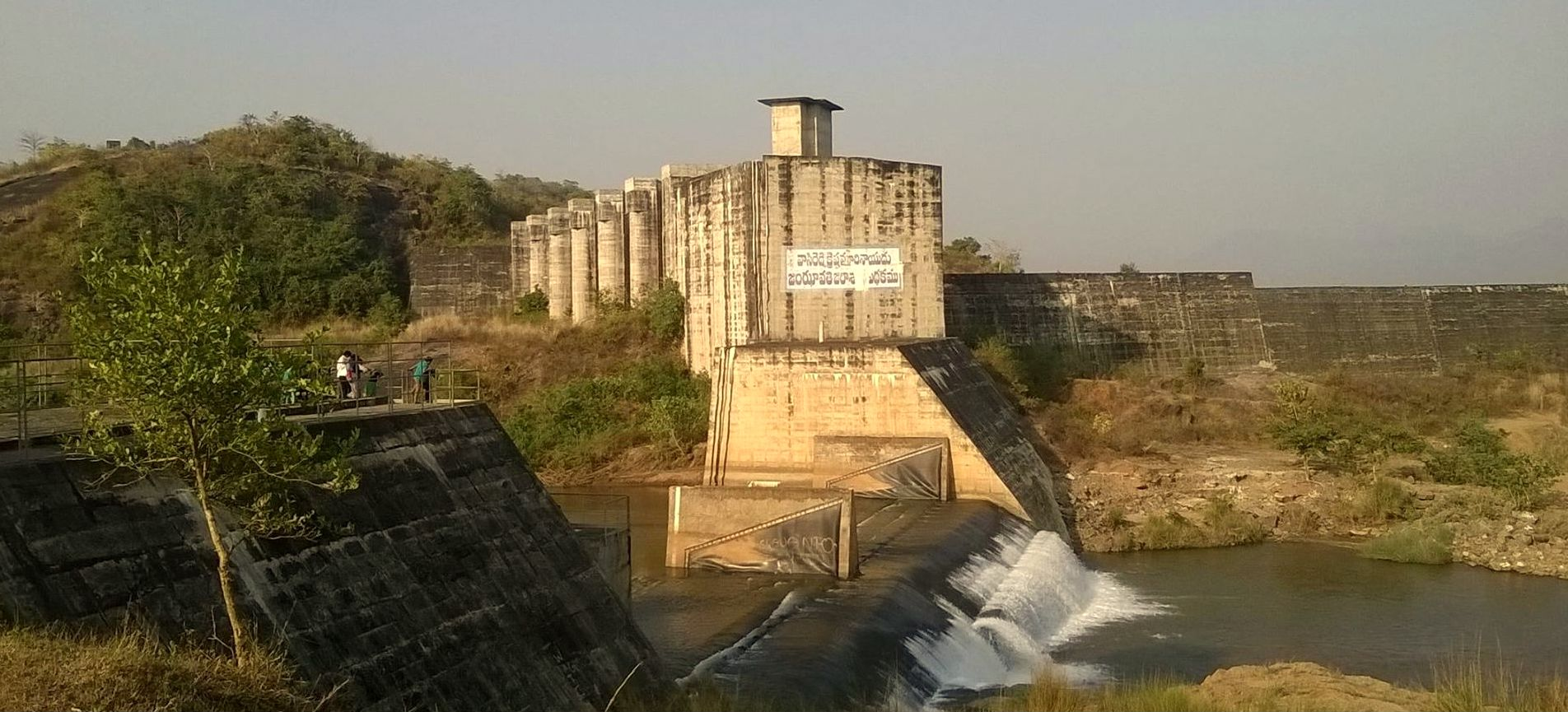
Janjavathi Rubber Dam

== Agriculture ==
Parvathipuram is agriculture based area here mainly cultivating paddy, cashew nuts, mangoes, mahua and other minor crops. Farmers in this area are mainly depending on Janjavathi Rubber Dam and Thotapalli Reservoir for agriculture. Thotapalli Reservoir is also supplying drinking water to Parvathipuram town.

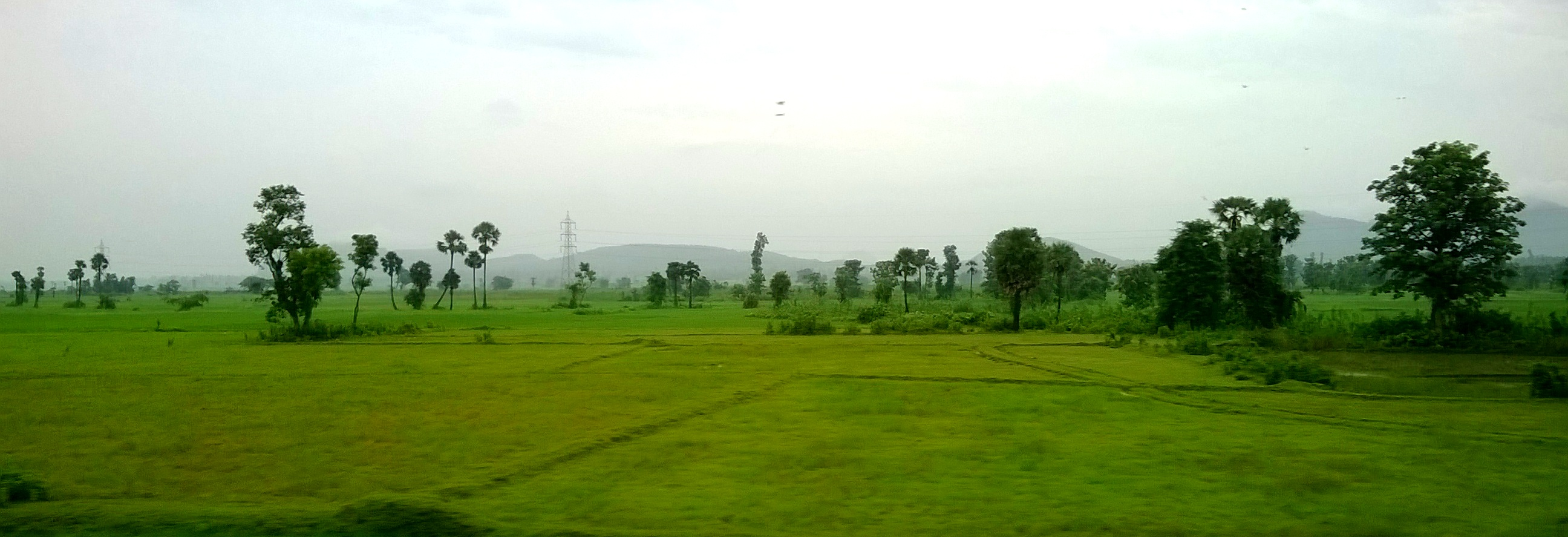
Paddy fields near parvathipuram

== Climate ==
Climate data for Parvathipuram, Andhra Pradesh
Month	Jan	Feb	Mar	Apr	May	Jun	Jul	Aug	Sep	Oct	Nov	Dec	Year
Mean daily maximum °C (°F)	26 (79)	28.3 (82.9)	33.2 (91.8)	35.1 (95.2)	36.1 (97.0)	34.2 (93.6)	30.9 (87.6)	30.8 (87.4)	31.2 (88.2)	30.9 (87.6)	27 (81)	25.5 (77.9)	30.8 (87.4)
Mean daily minimum °C (°F)	14.3 (57.7)	16.8 (62.2)	20.1 (68.2)	25.2 (77.4)	27.2 (81.0)	26.8 (80.2)	25.3 (77.5)	25.1 (77.2)	25 (77)	21.5 (70.7)	17 (63)	14.3 (57.7)	21.6 (70.8)
Average rainfall mm (inches)	18 (0.7)	15 (0.6)	21 (0.8)	31 (1.2)	90 (3.5)	192 (7.6)	289 (11.4)	312 (12.3)	264 (10.4)	238 (9.4)	38 (1.5)	21 (0.8)	1,529 (60.2)
Source: en.climate-data.org

== Education ==
Parvathipuram is a Major Educational Hub for Surrounding Mandals and villages. Here many private & public schools and Junior & Degree colleges are Located.

- Colleges:
1. DR. YSR Horticultural University, College of Horticulture]], Parvathipuram
2. Sri Venkateswara Degree college, Parvathipuram
3. Gayatri Degree college
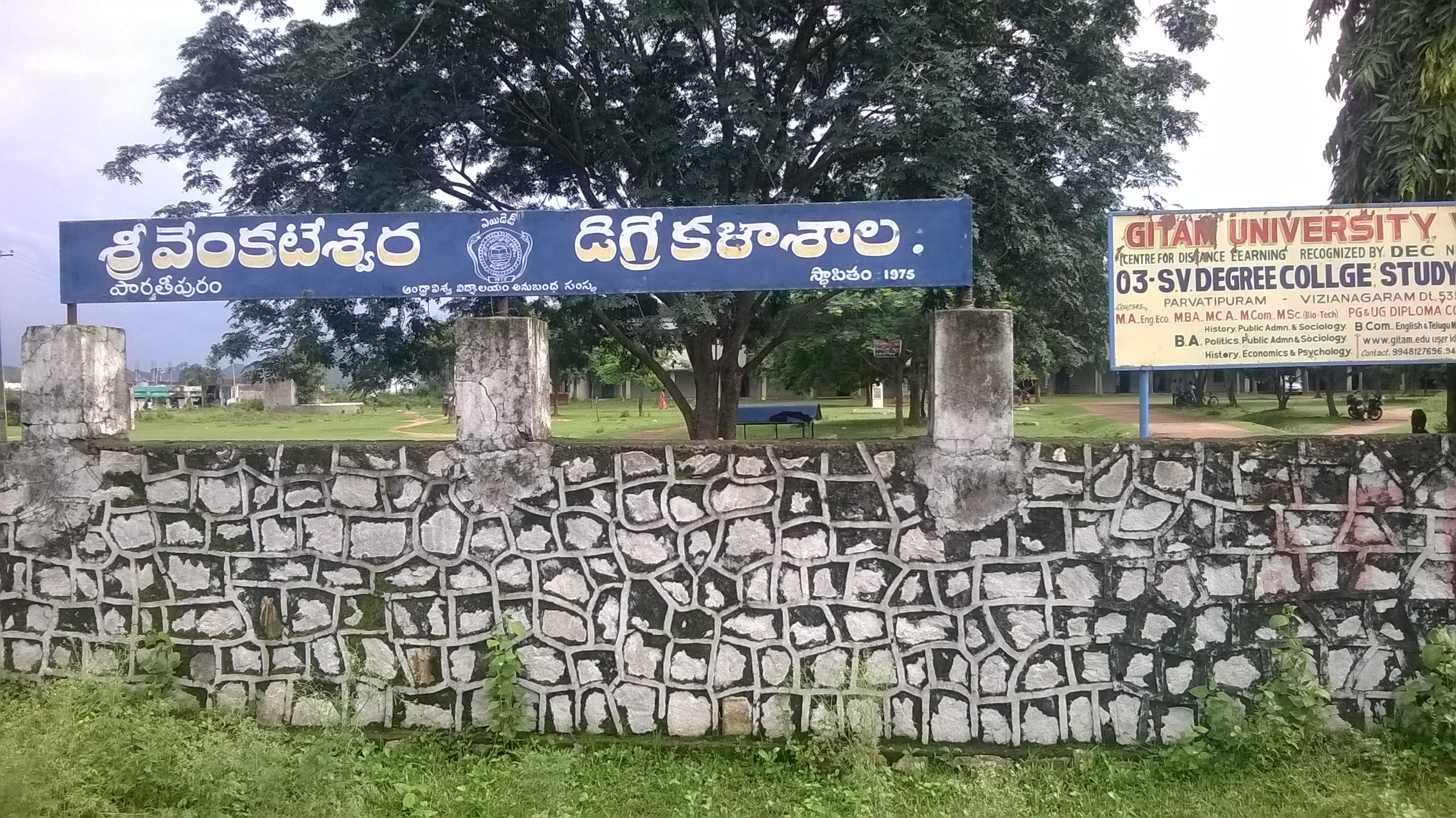
  Sri Venkateswara Degree College
4. Janahita Degree College
5. Government Polytechnic College, Mr nagaram
6. Shirdhi Sai Polytechnic College
7. APTWR Jr College of Excellence, Parvathipuram
8. Bhaskar Junior College
9. DBK Arts & Sci Jr College, Sunki
10. Government junior college, Parvathipuram
11. Sri Sa Iram Jr College
12. Vasavi junior College
- Schools:
1. Pratibha Excellence school, Parvathipuram
2. DVMM School, Parvathipuram
3. Lions Eng. Medium school, Parvathipuram
4. Kavirayani Public School, Parvathipuram
5. St. Peters English Medium School, Parvathipuram
6. R.C.M. St Johns boys high school, Parvathipuram
7. R.C.M St Josephs Girls High School, Parvatipuram
8. Surya teja public school, Parvathipuram
9. Suresh Public school, Parvathipuram
10. Noble Public school, Parvathipuram
11. Bhaskar high School, Parvathipuram
12. Janahita Public school, Parvathipuram
13. sridhar public school, Parvathipuram
14. Viswa Vignana Vidyalayam, Parvathipuram
15. Ravindra Bharathi School, Parvathipuram
16. Narayana E Techno School, Parvathipuram
17. Bharatha Maata High School, Parvathipuram
18. Aditya Public School, Parvathipuram
19. Sri Krishna Public School, Parvathipuram
20. K.P.M High school Kothavalasa parvathipuram

== Notable people ==
- Ganesh Patro, Telugu cinema

== See also ==
- List of municipalities in Andhra Pradesh
