= Adityapur railway station =

Railway station in Jharkhand, India

Adityapur

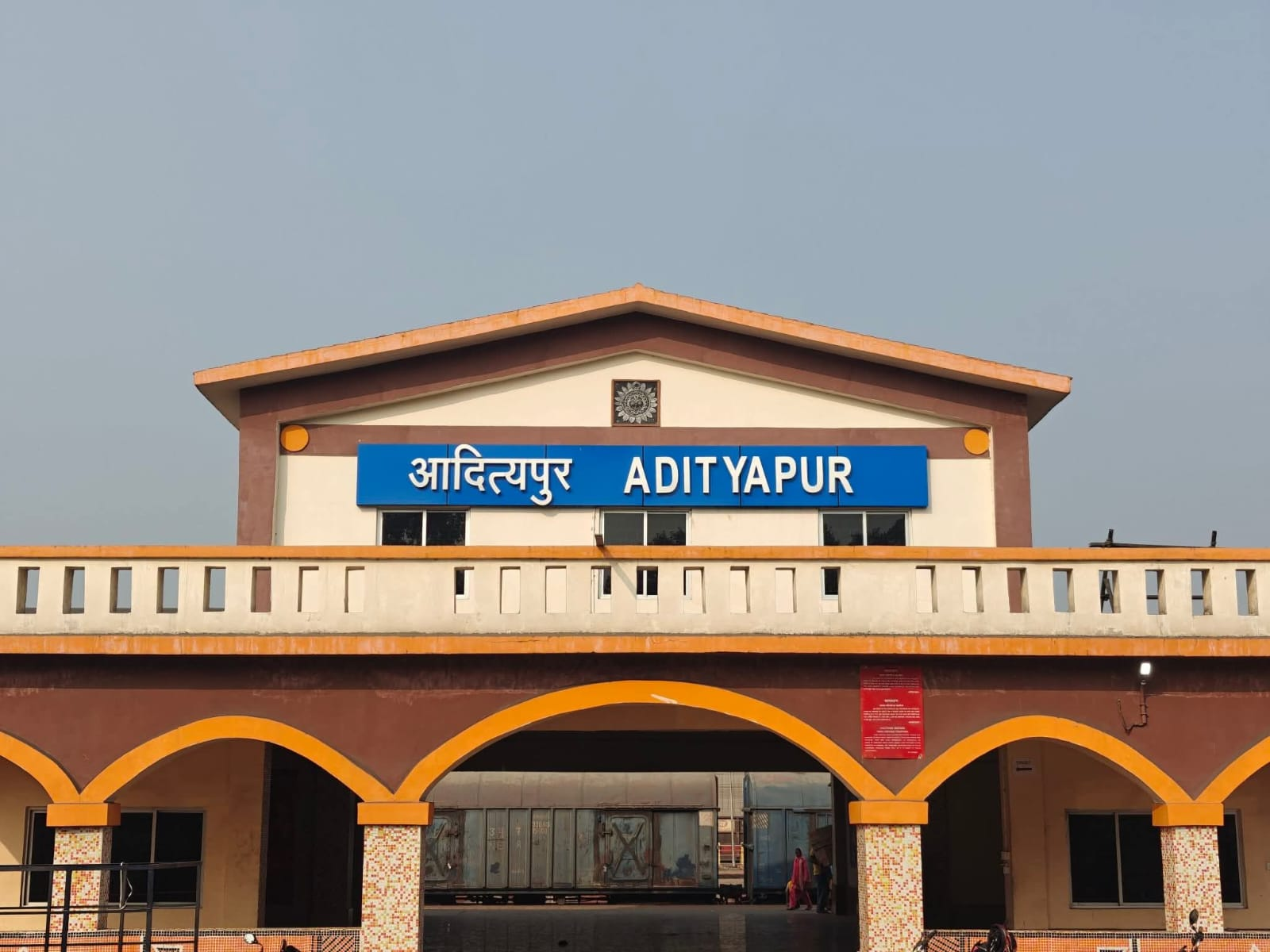
- Adityapur Railway Station Main Entrance

General information
- Location: Adityapur, Jharkhand; India
- Coordinates: 22°46′56″N 86°09′34″E
- Elevation: 158 metres (518 ft)
- System: Indian Railways station
- Owner: Indian Railways
- Operator: South Eastern Railway
- Platforms: 5
- Tracks: 6
- Connections: Auto stand

Construction
- Structure type: Standard on ground
- Parking: Available
- Accessible: Available

Other information
- Station code: ADTP
- Zone(s): South Eastern Railway
- Division(s): Chakradharpur
- Classification: NSG-5

History
- Rebuilt: 2024
Route map
Location
- Location within Jharkhand Location within India
- Interactive map

Adityapur Railway Station (station code: ADTP) is a railway station in Seraikela Kharsawan district, Jharkhand, India. It serves Adityapur colony of Jamshedpur city. The station falls under the Chakradharpur railway division of the South Eastern Railway.

== Redevelopment ==
The station has undergone significant redevelopment by Rail Vikas Nigam Limited (RVNL) at a cost of approximately ₹2.30 crore. The project includes a double-storeyed station building spread over 10,674 sq. ft., equipped with modern passenger amenities such as an air-conditioned retiring room, a first-class waiting room, ticket booking counters, and an automated teller machine kiosk, among others, under one roof.

Apartl Vikas Nigam Limited (RVNL) handed over newly built platform nos - 1 & 2 to the Commercial Dept of South Eastern Railways following completion of work for the new third line. Presently, only goods trains operate on these platforms. Several works are in progress for the development of the station and for the convenience of passengers.

== Line and location ==
Adityapur is located on the Howrah–Nagpur–Mumbai line of the Indian Railways.
