= Asansol–Tatanagar–Kharagpur line =

Railway route in India

Asansol–Tatanagar–Kharagpur line (including Adra–Bokaro Steel City, Adra-Gomoh branch line, Adra-Dhanbad branch line, Purulia–Kotshila & Tatanagar–Badampahar branch lines)

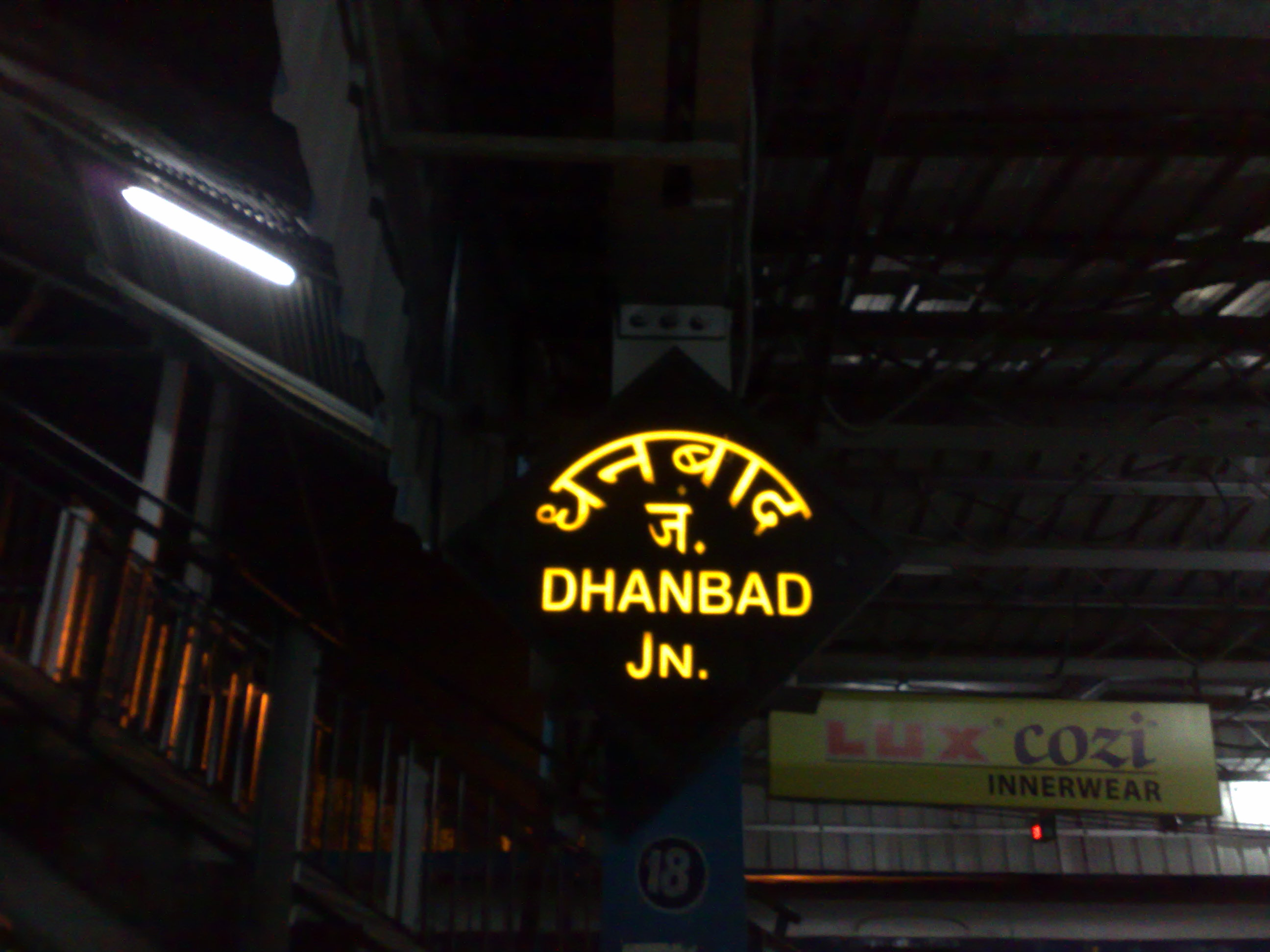
- Dhanbad Junction is an important railway station on Asansol–Tatanagar–Kharagpur line

Overview
- Status: Operational
- Owner: Indian Railways
- Locale: West Bengal, Jharkhand
- Termini: Asansol; Kharagpur

Service
- Type: Rail line
- Operator: South Eastern Railway

History
- Opened: 1891 onwards

Technical
- Track gauge: 5 ft 6 in (1,676 mm) broad gauge
- Electrification: 1961–63 with 25 kV AC overhead line

The Asansol–Adra–Tatanagar–Kharagpur line is part of Howrah and eastern India's links with Mumbai and Chennai. It is also a major freight line for transporting iron ore, coal and steel products. This page includes the Adra–Bokaro Steel City branch line, the Adra-Gomoh branch line, the Adra-Dhanbad branch line and Tatanagar–Badampahar branch lines. Burnpur railway station

== History ==
The Howrah–Allahabad–Mumbai line, a joint effort of Great Indian Peninsula Railway and East Indian Railway Company came up in 1870. The Bengal Nagpur Railway was formed in 1887 for the purpose of upgrading the Nagpur Chhattisgarh Railway and then extending it via Bilaspur to Asansol, in order to develop a shorter Howrah–Mumbai route than the one via Allahabad. The Bengal Nagpur Railway main line from Nagpur to Asansol, on the Howrah–Delhi main line, was opened for goods traffic on 1 February 1891. However, it was only after Kharagpur was linked from the west and the south that it was connected to Howrah in 1900.

The closing years of the 19th century and the opening years of the 20th century were momentous for the area. 800 miles of East Coast Railway was built and opened for traffic between 1893 and 1896. The most vital sections of Bengal Nagpur Railway, Sini–Kharagpur–Kolaghat and Kharagpur–Cuttack, were opened to traffic in 1898–99. The Purulia–Ranchi branch was opened for traffic on 15 November 1907. BNR lines were extended to Gomoh, on EIR's main line, in 1907. The Mohuda–Chandrapura branch line was opened in 1913.

A 40-mile branch line from Tatanagar to Gorumahisani was opened to traffic in 1911 mainly for transportation of iron ore.

The Purulia–Ranchi line was opened as a narrow-gauge railway of BNR in 1907.

=== Railway reorganization ===
The Bengal Nagpur Railway was nationalized in 1944.Eastern Railway was formed on 14 April 1952 with the portion of East Indian Railway Company east of Mughalsarai and the Bengal Nagpur Railway. In 1955, South Eastern Railway was carved out of Eastern Railway. It comprised lines mostly operated by BNR earlier.

== Steel plants and freight traffic ==
India's first integrated steel plant, Tata Steel's plant at Jamshedpur, became operational in 1908.IISCO Steel Plant was established at Burnpur in 1918.Steel Authority of India's Durgapur Steel Plant was established in the late fifties, and Bokaro Steel Plant became operational in the seventies.

Although the Asansol–Gaya section of Grand Chord and Bardhaman–Asansol section of Howrah–Delhi main line serves as the principal links for Jharia Coalfield and Raniganj Coalfield, this line also links to both the coalfields. This railway line is also serving the upcoming Raghunathpur industrial area, situated near Adra in Purulia district. The new Raghunathpur Thermal Power Station (DVC) and ACC Cement Factory (Madhukunda) are a part of this.

With four steel plants served by these lines South Eastern Railway transports bulk of the raw materials like coal and iron ore used by the steel industry. It loaded 61.24 million tonnes during the period April to September 2012. Indian Railway handled 456 million tonnes of coal in 2011–12. It was the single largest item of freight traffic. It handled 104.71 million tonnes of iron ore in 2011–12.

== Electrification ==
The Asansol–Purulia, Purulia–Chakradharpur, Kandra–Gamharria and Sini–Adityapur sectors were electrified in 1961–62. The Tatanagar–Kharagpur sector was electrified in 1962–63. The Tatanagar-Gorumahisani-Aunlajori sector of the Tatanagar-Gorumahisani-Aunlajori-Badampahar line was electrified in 2020-21.

== Passenger movement ==
Asansol, Adra, Dhanbad, Tatanagar and Kharagpur, on this line, are the amongst the top 100 booking stations of Indian Railway.
