= Nagpur Chhattisgarh Railway =

Indian railway route

Nagpur Chhattisgarh Railway was a 49 miles (79 km) 1,000 mm (3 ft 3 3/8 in) metre gauge line owned by the provincial government and operated by the state railways. The line ran from Nagpur via Tumsar - Gondia and Dongargarh to Rajnandgaon. The initial section from Nagpur to Tumsar was opened on 6 July 1880, continuing to Tirora on 21 February 1881, Gondia on 18 May 1881, Amgaon on 25 November 1881 and completed to Rajnandgaon on 16 February 1882.

The Nagpur Chhattisgarh Railway was transferred to be operated by the Bengal Nagpur Railway in year 1888 and was converted into 1,676 mm (5 ft 6 in) broad gauge in the same year itself. The new track from Rajnandgaon to Asansol was later laid since 1888 onwards under BNR.

== See also ==
- Dalli Rajhara–Jagdalpur line
