= Bengal Nagpur Railway =

Indian railway branch

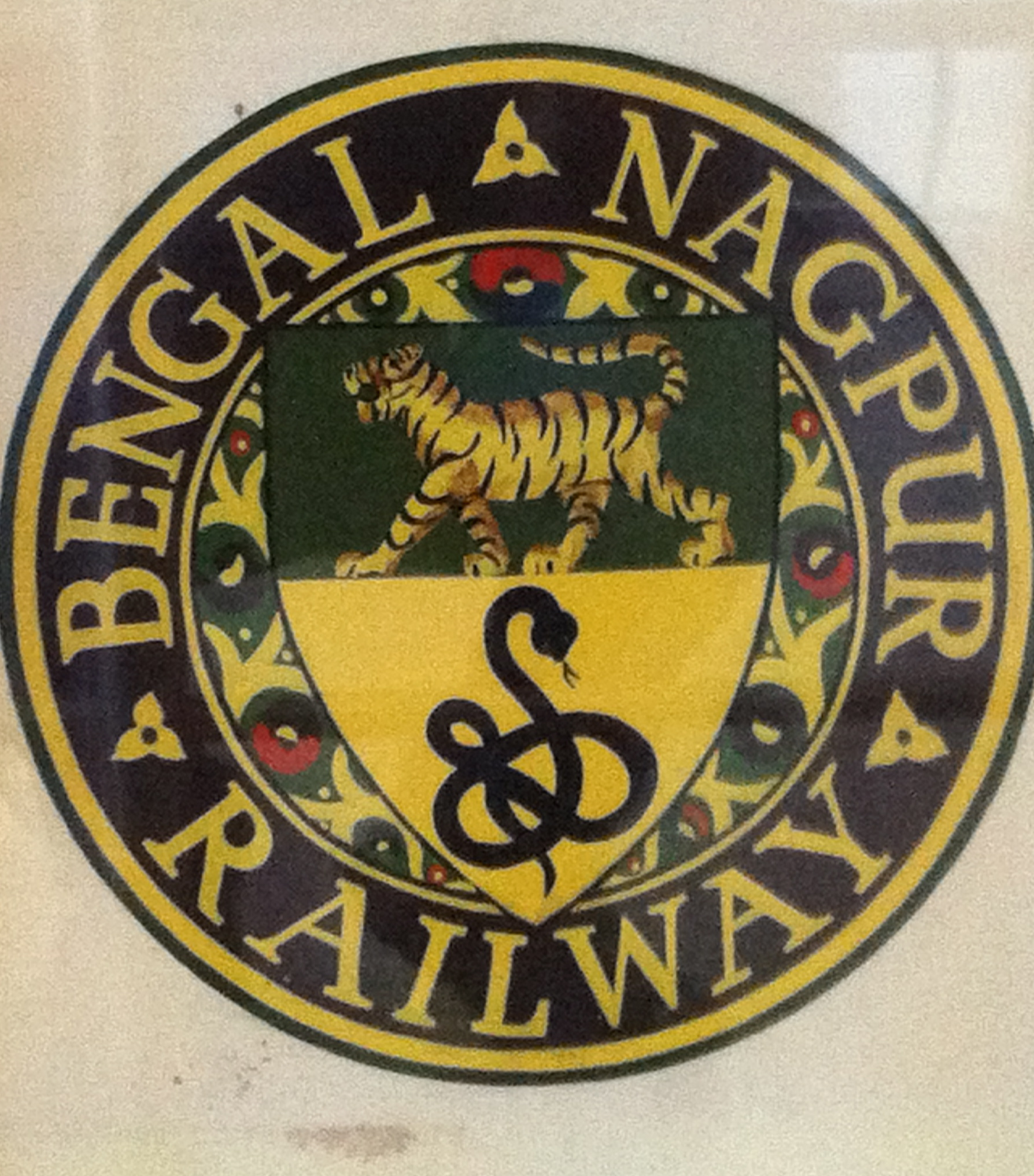
- Industry: Railways
- Founded: 1887
- Defunct: 1952 (Merged with East Indian Railway Company to form Eastern Railway)
- Headquarters: Kolkata, India
- Area served: Eastern and Central India
- Services: Rail transport
- Subsidiaries: Bengal Nagpur Railway

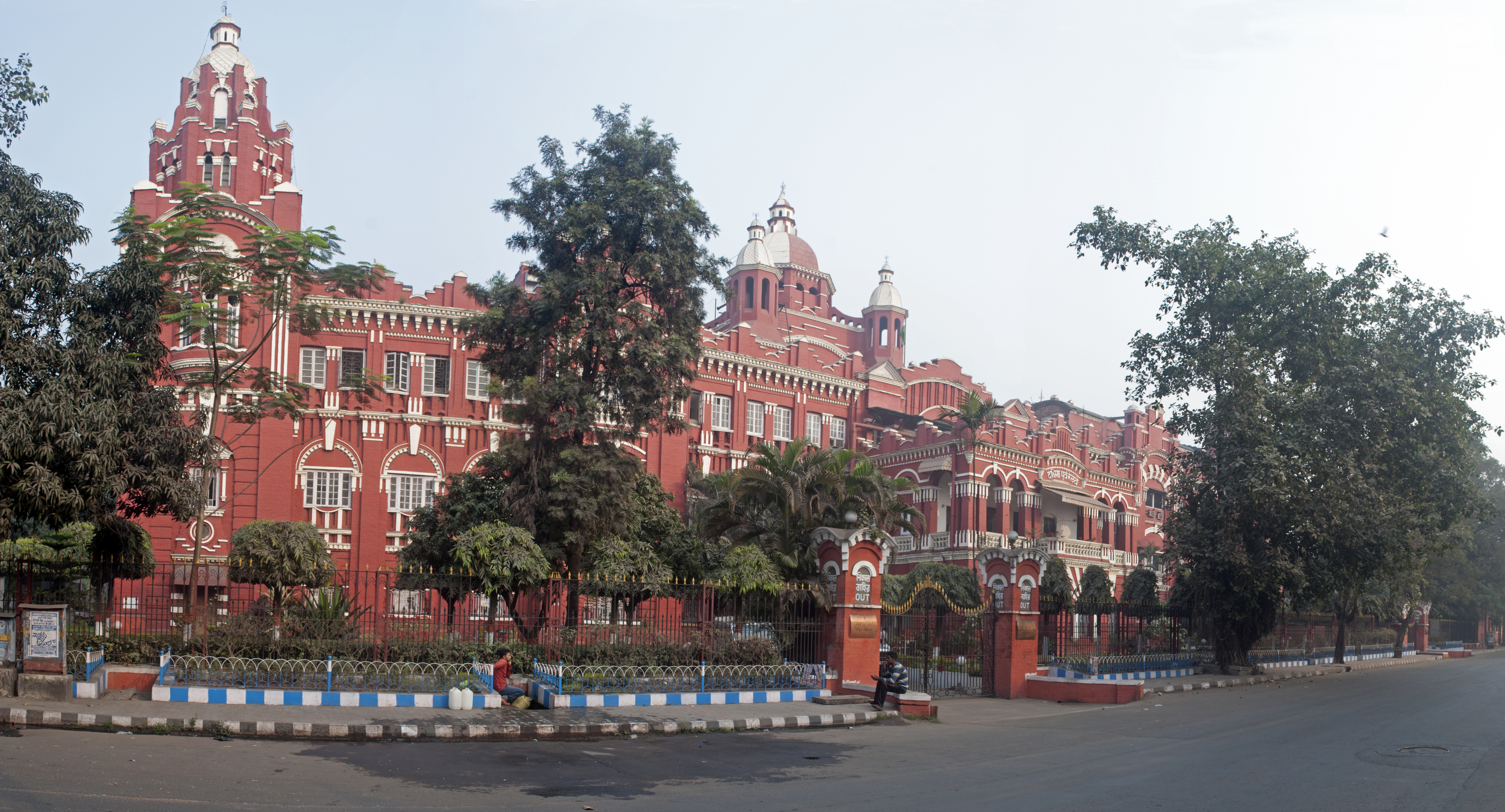
Bengal Nagpur Railway (BNR) Headquarters, now South Eastern Railway (SER) headquarters, Garden Reach, Kolkata

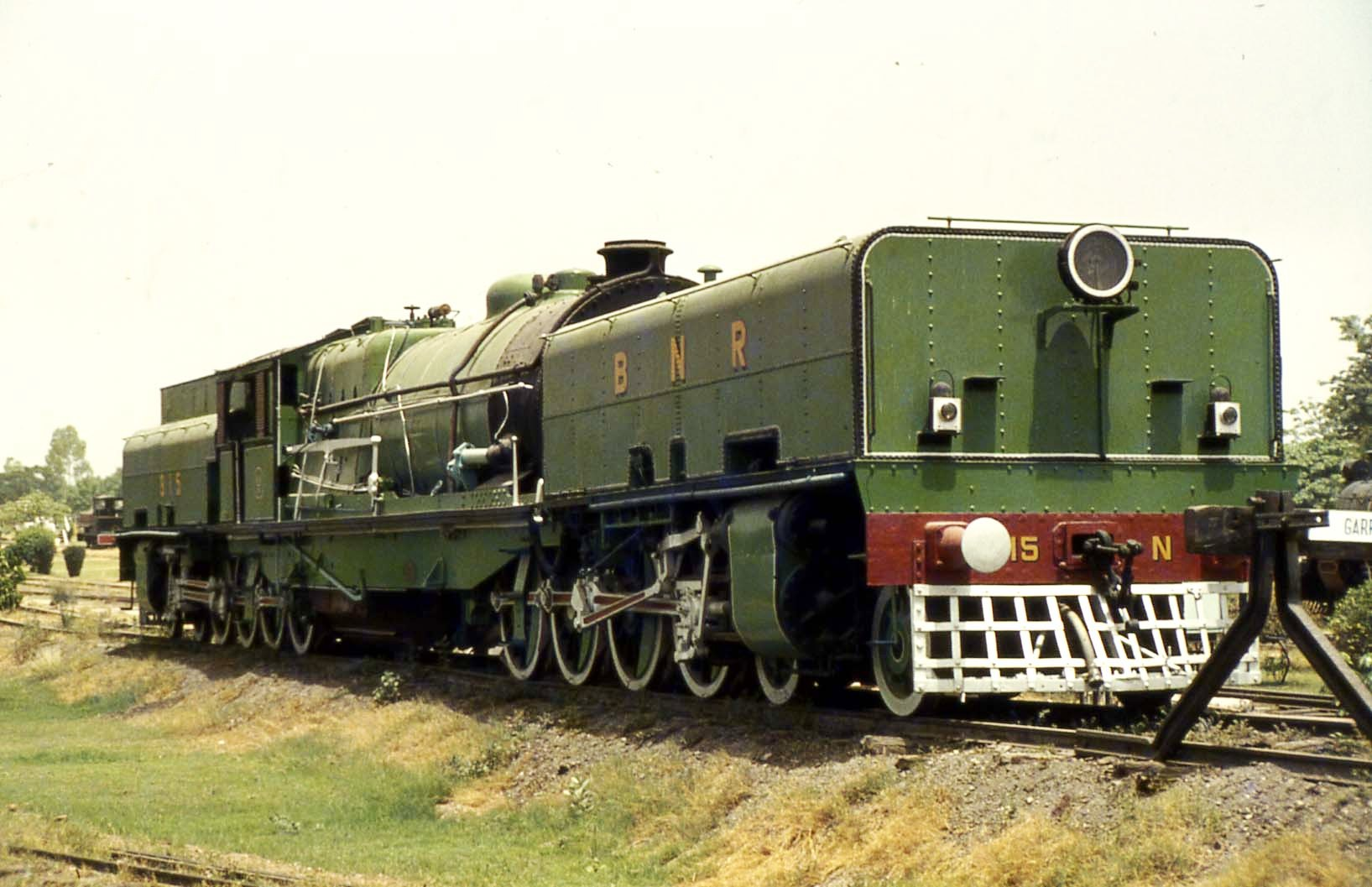
Garratt locomotive 6594 of the Bengal Nagpur Railway at the National Rail Museum

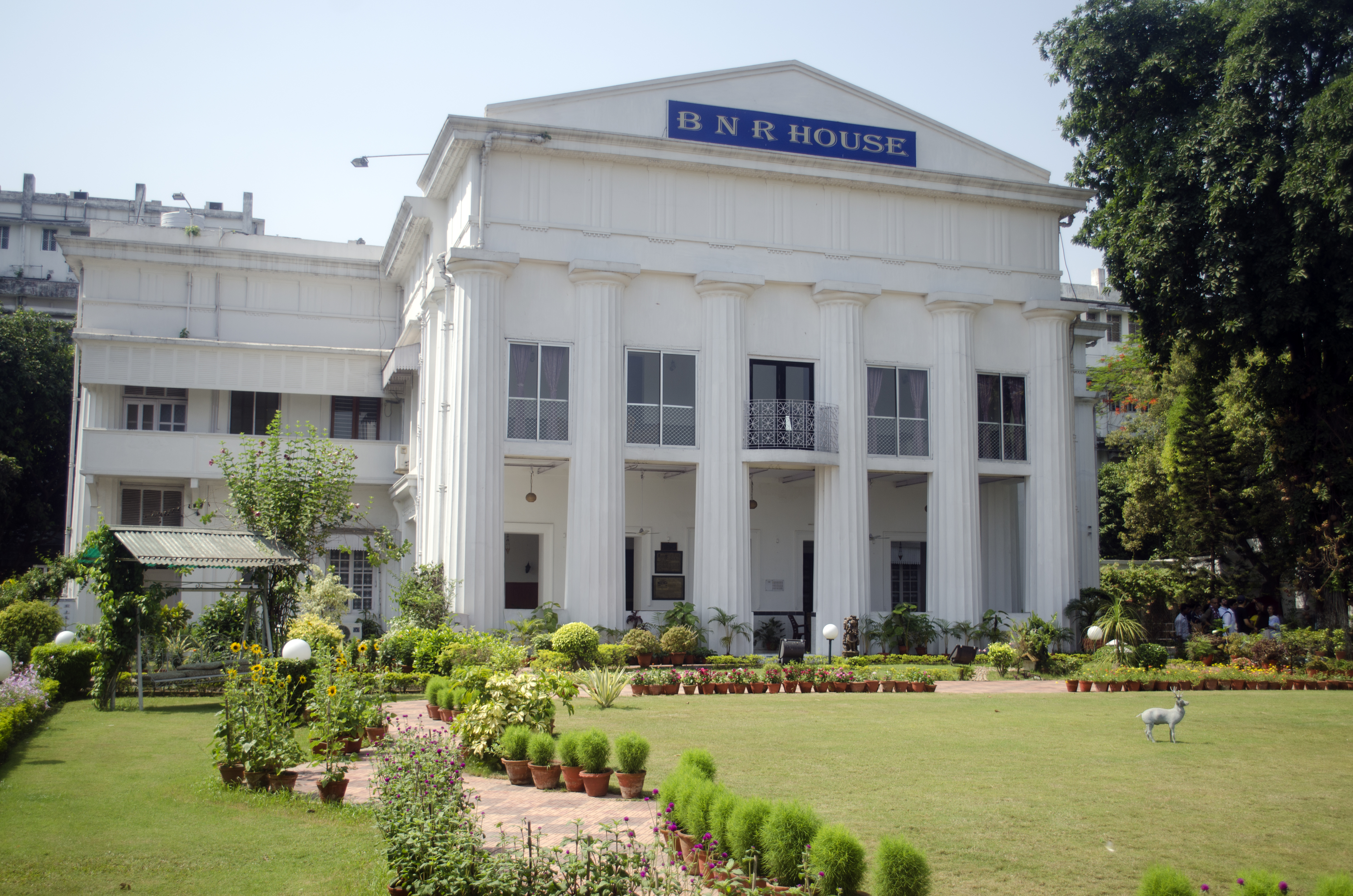
BNR House, residence of the GM of SER

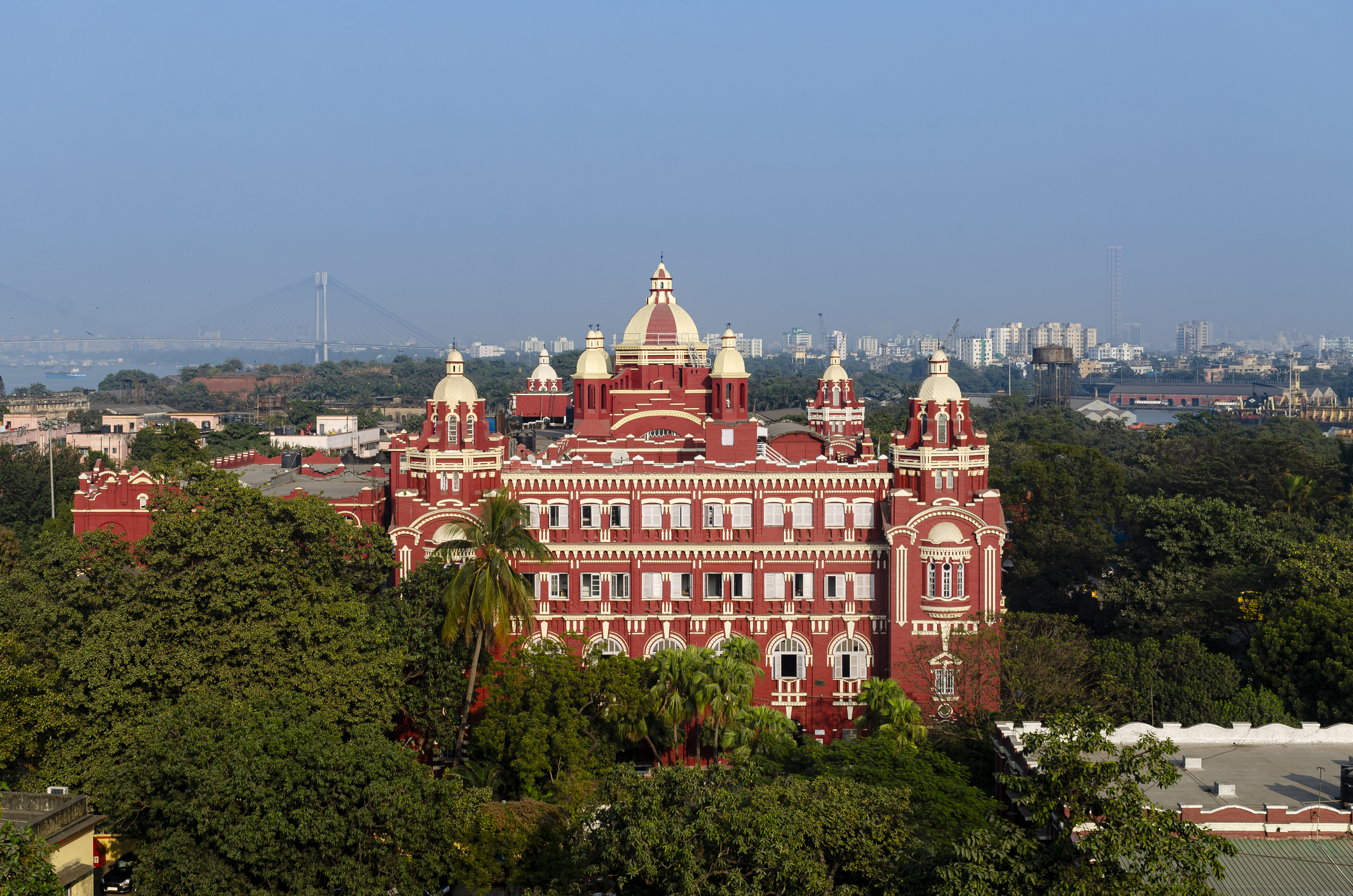
Headquarters of South Eastern Railway

The Bengal Nagpur Railway was one of the companies which pioneered development of the railways in eastern and central India. It was succeeded first by Eastern Railway and subsequently by South Eastern Railway.

== History ==
The opening of the Mumbai–Thane line in 1853 marked the beginning of railways in India. Extension of the railways was set off throughout the country. On the north-eastern side of Mumbai, the Great Indian Peninsular Railway line was extended up to Bhusawal and then split in two. While one track led to Nagpur, the other to Jabalpur to connect with the East Indian Railway line from Allahabad to Jabalpur, thereby connecting Mumbai and Kolkata. The great famine of 1878 provided an opportunity for the construction of 150 km long meter gauge link called the Nagpur Chhattisgarh Railway in 1882 connecting Nagpur with Rajnandgaon.

The Bengal Nagpur Railway was formed in 1887 for the purpose of upgrading the Nagpur Chhattisgarh Line and then extending it via Bilaspur to Asansol, in order to develop a shorter Howrah-Mumbai route than the one via Allahabad. The Nagpur Chhattisgarh Railway was owned by the provincial government. Bengal Nagpur Railway was formed in 1887. The Nagpur Chhattisgarh Railway was purchased from Great Indian Peninsula Railway by Bengal Nagpur Railway in 1888, and was converted to broad gauge. The Bengal Nagpur Railway main line from Nagpur to Asansol was opened for goods traffic on 1 February 1891. It was only after Kharagpur was linked from the west and the south that it was connected to Howrah in 1900. Further it was planned to construct a 161 miles long Branch Line from Bilaspur to Umaria for through connection with the Great Indian Peninsula Railway(GIPR) system at Katni, This BNR main line was completed in 1886-87 and connected to the Umaria Coalfield Railway, which worked from Umaria to Katni, thus creating a branch line connecting BNR station at Bilaspur to GIP Railway station Katni near Jabalpur. Further, 1901 part of the East Coast State Railway was absorbed into the BNR, thus the Cuttack to Waltair section came under management of BNR.

Although Bengal Nagpur Railway was not a part of original design to connect major points in the subcontinent with a network of railways, it was instrumental in developing a shorter, and hence more popular, route from Howrah to Mumbai and the trunk route from Howrah to Chennai.

The civil engineer Lt Col Arthur John Barry was the Executive Engineer in charge of the construction of the bridge over the Damodar River and the work of the Damodar district of the Bengal-Nagpur Railway, of which he was afterwards Superintending Engineer of the Bengal section.

In 1925, Bengal Nagpur Railway purchased five steam railcars from Sentinel and Metro-Cammell. In 1936 the company owned 802 locomotives, five railcars, 692 coaches and 25.434 goods wagons.

The management of the Bengal Nagpur Railway was taken over by the Government of India in 1944. Eastern Railway was formed on 14 April 1952 with the portion of East Indian Railway Company east of Mughalsarai and the Bengal Nagpur Railway. In 1955, South Eastern Railway was carved out of Eastern Railway. It comprised lines mostly operated by BNR earlier. Amongst the new zones started in April 2003 were East Coast Railway and South East Central Railway and South Coast Railway was bifurcated between ECOR and SCR and a new Zone was formed in Visakahapatnam as Headquarters. Both these railways were carved out of South Eastern Railway.

== Classification ==
It was labeled as a Class I railway according to Indian Railway Classification System of 1926.
