= Bankura Junction railway station =

Railway Station in West Bengal

BANKURA JUNCTION বাঁকুড়া জংশন

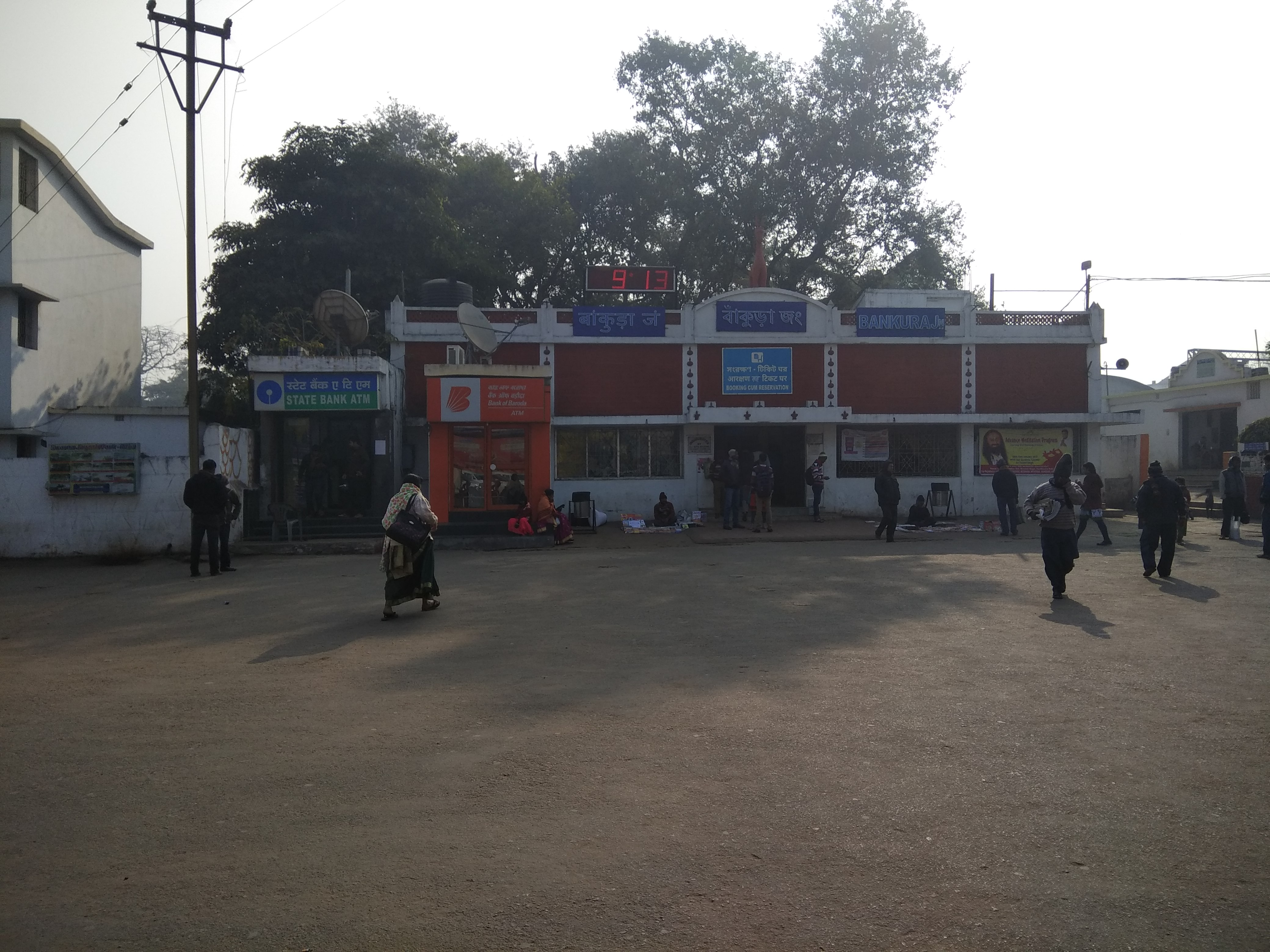
- Bankura Junction railway station building

General information
- Location: Bankura; India
- Coordinates: 23°13′28″N 87°04′29″E
- Elevation: 46 metres (151 ft)
- System: Indian Railways
- Owner: Indian railways
- Operator: South Eastern Railways
- Lines: Kharagpur–Bankura–Adra line, Bankura–Masagram line
- Platforms: 3
- Tracks: 6

Construction
- Structure type: At grade
- Parking: Yes

Other information
- Status: Functioning
- Station code: BQA
- Zone(s): South Eastern Railway
- Division(s): Adra

History
- Opened: 1903–04
- Former names: Bengal Nagpur Railway

Services
Preceding station	Indian Railways	Following station
Anchuri towards Adra Junction	South Eastern Railway zone Kharagpur–Bankura–Adra line	Bheduasol towards Kharagpur Junction
Location
- Location within India Location within West Bengal
- Interactive map of Bankura Junction

Bankura Junction railway station is a railway junction station of Kharagpur–Bankura–Adra line and Bankura–Damodar Railway (Bankura–Masagram line) route under the Adra railway division of South Eastern Railway. It is situated near Lalbazar, Bankura town in Bankura district in the Indian state of West Bengal. Numerous express trains stop here. Recently, the train platform locators has been updated in the platforms, which has been really helpful for the passengers in order to identify the coach location of the train.

Bankura railway station is a three-way junction point having direct connection to Adra/Gomoh, Bishnupur/Kharagpur/Balasore, Masagram station on the Howrah-Barddhaman chord line via Sonamukhi.

== Trains ==
Some of the major trains available from this railway station are as follows:

- New Delhi Bhubaneswar Rajdhani Express
- Yesvantpur–Kamakhya AC Superfast Express
- MGR Chennai Central–New Jalpaiguri Superfast Express
- Samarsata Express
- Porbandar–Santragachi Kavi Guru Express
- Baidyanath Dham Express
- Puri–Jaynagar Express
- Puri–Kamakhya Express
- Nandan Kanan Express
- Howrah–Purulia Express
- Digha–Malda Town Express
- Haldia–Asansol Express
- Digha–Asansol Express
- Howrah–Ranchi Intercity Express
- Rupasi Bangla Express
- Ernakulam-Patna Express
- Aranyak Express
- Gomoh-Kharagpur Express
- Dhanbad-Bankura Memu

== History ==
Kharagpur–Bankura–Adra line was opened in 1901. This railway track including Bankura Junction railway station was electrified in 1997–98. Old narrow-gauge Bankura–Damodar Railway (also called as Bankura Damodar River Railway) connecting Bankura and Rainagar in Bankura and Bardhaman districts was opened to traffic in sections between 1916 and 1917. In 2005, the 118 kilometer-long railway section known as Bankura–Masagram line was converted to 1,676 mm (5 ft 6 in) broad gauge. The whole track was electrified in 2018–19.
