= Digha–Asansol Express =

Overview
- Service type: Express
- First service: 11 January 2010; 16 years ago
- Current operator: Eastern Railway zone

Route
- Termini: Digha (DGHA); Asansol Junction (ASN)
- Stops: 18
- Distance travelled: 372 km (231 mi)
- Average journey time: 7h 50m
- Service frequency: One day (Note: Runs One day in a week for every direction.)
- Train number: 13505/13506

On-board services
- Class: General Unreserved
- Seating arrangements: Yes
- Sleeping arrangements: No
- Catering facilities: On-board catering E-catering
- Observation facilities: ICF coach
- Entertainment facilities: No
- Baggage facilities: No
- Other facilities: Below the seats

Technical
- Rolling stock: 2
- Track gauge: 1,676 mm (5 ft 6 in)
- Operating speed: 110 km/h (68 mph), including halts

The Digha–Asansol Express is an Express train belonging to Eastern Railway zone that runs between Digha and Asansol Junction in India. It is currently being operated with 13505/13506 train numbers on One day in a week basis.

== Service ==
The 13505/Digha–Asansol Express has an average speed of 48 km/h and covers 372 km in 7h 50m. The 13506/Asansol–Digha Express has an average speed of 47 km/h and covers 372 km in 8h.

== Route and stops ==
The important stops of the train are:

- Digha
- Kanthi PH
- Nandakumar
- Tamluk Junction
- Panskura Junction
- Kharagpur Junction
- Midnapore
- Salboni
- Chandrakona Road
- Garbeta
- Bishnupur
- Ondagram
- Bankura Junction
- Chhatna
- Adra Junction
- Muradi
- Madhukunda
- Burnpur
- Asansol Junction

== Coach composition ==
The train has standard ICF rakes with a maximum speed of 110 kmph. The train consists of 15 coaches:

- 11 general
- 2 seating cum luggage rake
- 2 Chair Car (Reserved)

== Traction ==
Both trains are hauled by an Asansol Loco Shed-based WAP-4 type electric locomotive from Haldia to Asansol and back.

== Rake sharing ==
The train shares its rake with 22329/22330 Haldia–Asansol Superfast Express.

== See also ==
- Digha railway station
- Asansol Junction railway station
- Haldia–Asansol Express
- Digha–Malda Town Express
