= Haldia–Asansol Express =

Train in India

Haldia–Asansol Superfast Express
Overview
- Service type: Superfast
- First service: 5 January 2010; 16 years ago
- Current operator: Eastern Railway zone

Route
- Termini: Haldia (HLZ); Asansol Junction (ASN)
- Stops: 18
- Distance travelled: 324 km (201 mi)
- Average journey time: 6h 35m
- Service frequency: Six days (Note: Runs six days in a week for every direction.)
- Train number: 22329/22330

On-board services
- Class: General Unreserved
- Seating arrangements: No
- Sleeping arrangements: Yes
- Catering facilities: On-board catering E-catering
- Observation facilities: ICF coach
- Entertainment facilities: No
- Baggage facilities: No
- Other facilities: Below the seats

Technical
- Rolling stock: 2
- Track gauge: 1,676 mm (5 ft 6 in)
- Operating speed: 110 km/h (68 mph), including halts

The Haldia–Asansol Superfast Express is an Superfast Express train belonging to Eastern Railway zone that runs between Haldia and Asansol Junction in India. It is currently being operated with 22329/22330 train numbers on six days in a week basis.

== Service ==
The 22329/Haldia–Asansol Superfast Express has an average speed of 49 km/h and covers 324 km in 6h 35m. The 22330/Asansol–Haldia Superfast Express has an average speed of 49 km/h and covers 324 km in 6h 35m.

== Route and stops ==
The important stops of the train are:

- Haldia
- Durgachak Town
- Tamluk junction
- Panskura Junction
- Kharagpur Junction
- Midnapore
- Salboni
- Chandrakona Road
- Garbeta
- Bishnupur
- Ondagram
- Bankura Junction
- Chhatna
- Adra Junction
- Muradi
- Madhukunda
- Burnpur
- Asansol Junction

== Coach composition ==
The train has standard ICF rakes with max speed of 110 kmph. The train consists of 15 coaches:

- 11 General
- 2 Seating cum Luggage Car
- 2 Chair Car (Reserved)

== Traction ==
Both trains are hauled by an Asansol Loco Shed-based WAP-4 type electric locomotive from Haldia to Asansol and back.

== Rake sharing ==
The train shares its rake with 13505/13506 Digha–Asansol Express.

== See also ==
- Haldia railway station
- Asansol Junction railway station
- Digha–Asansol Express
- Digha–Malda Town Express
