= Bishnupur Junction railway station =

Railway station in West Bengal, India

BISHNUPUR JUNCTION

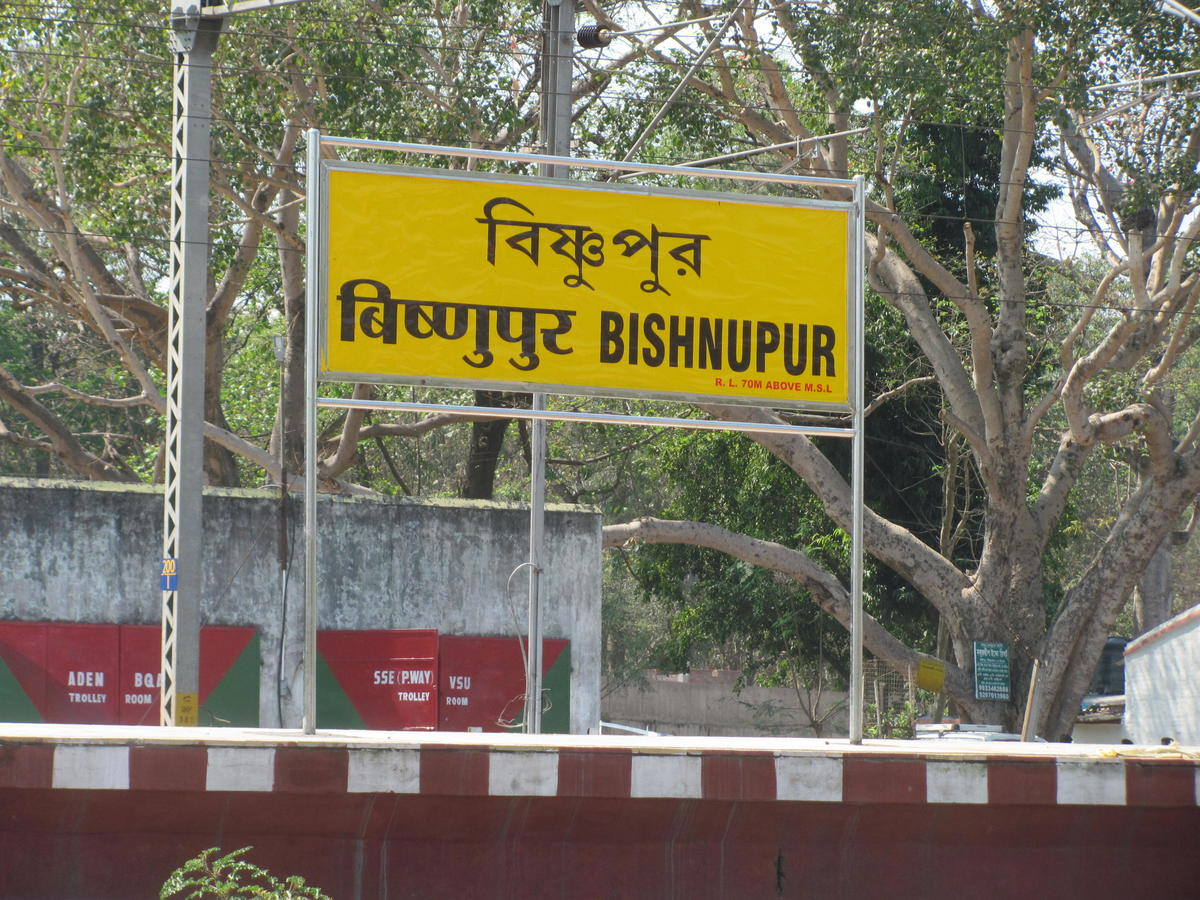
- Bishnupur Station

General information
- Location: National Highway 14, Bishnupur, Bankura, West Bengal; India
- Coordinates: 23°03′54″N 87°18′05″E
- Elevation: 75 metres (246 ft)
- System: Commuter rail & Inter-city rail station
- Owner: Indian Railways
- Operator: South Eastern Railway
- Line: Kharagpur–Bankura–Adra line Sheoraphuli–Bishnupur branch line
- Platforms: 3
- Tracks: 7
- Connections: Bus interchange up

Construction
- Structure type: At grade
- Parking: Yes
- Cycle facilities: Yes
- Accessible: Yes

Other information
- Status: Active NSG4 Category Station (based on tourist importance)
- Station code: VSU
- Zone(s): South Eastern Railway
- Division(s): Adra

History
- Electrified: Yes; 1997–98
- Former names: Bengal Nagpur Railway

Passengers
- Average 3,500,000 (India)

Services
Preceding station	Indian Railways	Following station
Ramsagar towards Adra Junction	South Eastern Railway zone Kharagpur–Bankura–Adra line	Piardoba towards Kharagpur Junction
Preceding station	Kolkata Suburban Railway	Following station
Terminus	Eastern Line Sheoraphuli–Bishnupur branch line	Birshamunda Halt towards Tarakeswar
Location
- Location within India Location within West Bengal
- Interactive map of Bishnupur

Bishnupur railway station is a junction railway station on the Kharagpur–Bankura–Adra line and Sheoraphuli–Bishnupur branch line. It is located in Bankura district in the Indian state of West Bengal. It serves the temple town of Bishnupur and surrounding areas.

== History ==
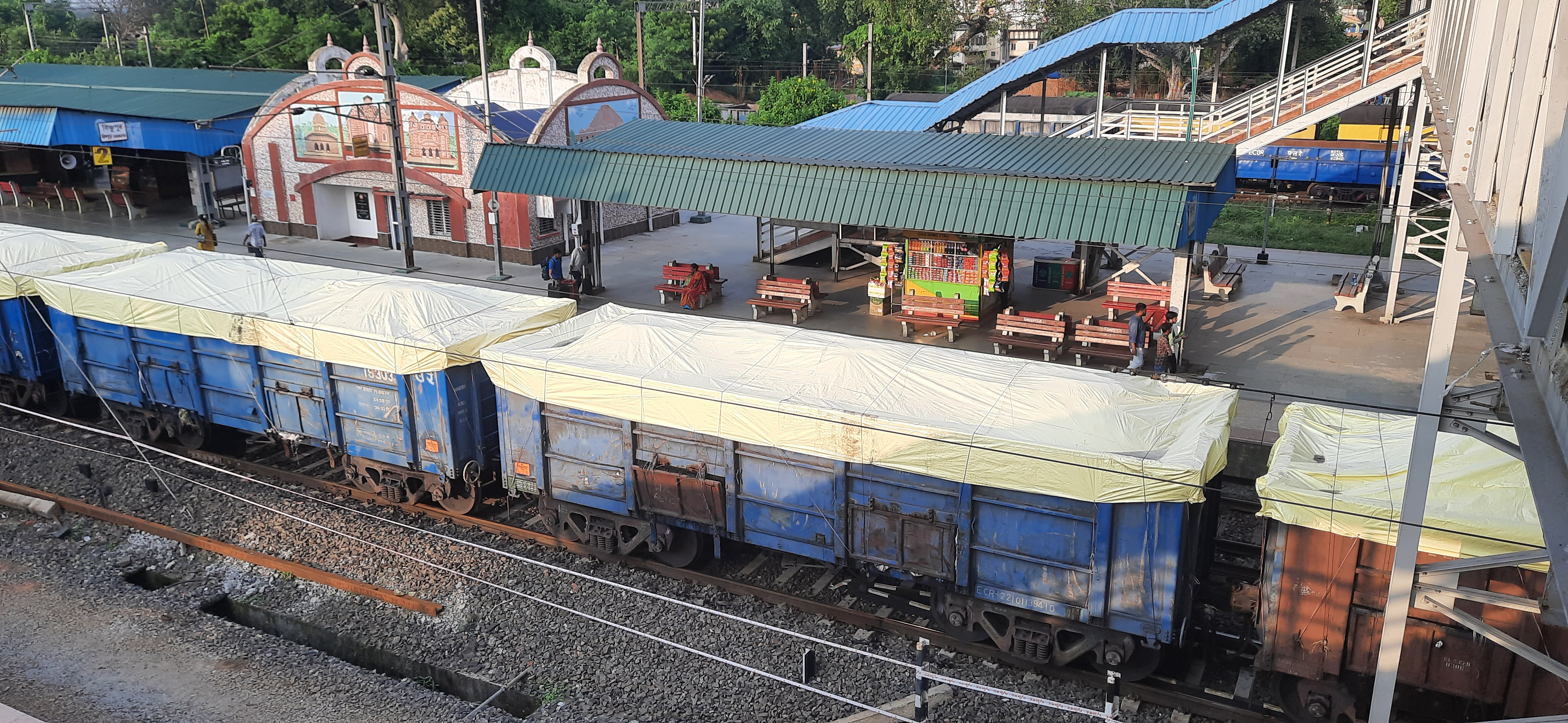
Bishnupur station from overbridge

The Kharagpur–Midnapur branch line was opened in 1901. The Midnapore–Jharia extension of the Bengal Nagpur Railway, passing through Bankura district was opened around 1903–04.

Bishnupur Railway Station officially started operations on 20 August 1903.

While travelling to Calcutta, Maa Sarada Devi boarded a train from this platform. There is a statue of her under the tree where she used to sit.

The completion of the Bishnupur–Gokulnagar Joypur sector of the Seoraphuli Jn.–Bishnupur branch line was announced in the Railway Budget for 2009–10. Part of the line is still under construction. After successful completion of the project it will be a part of Kolkata Suburban Railway functioning as its terminal station. The station is currently in renovation under the Amrit Bharat station scheme.

== Operations ==
Bishnupur Junction (South Eastern Railway) connects Bishnupur with various destinations across West Bengal and India. Major trains operating at this junction include:

- Aranyak Express
- Rupashi Bangla Express
- Howrah–Purulia Express
- Haldia–Asansol Express
- Digha–Asansol Express
- Howrah-Adra Rani Shiromani Express
- Puri–Kamakhya Weekly Express (via Adra)

Express and goods-carrying trains include:

- Adra–Bishnupur
- Kharagpur–Adra
- Garbeta–Adra
- Kharagpur–Ranchi
- Bishnupur–Dhanbad
- Kharagpur-NSC Bose J Gomo

As of 2024, Bishnupur Junction has three platforms and seven tracks.

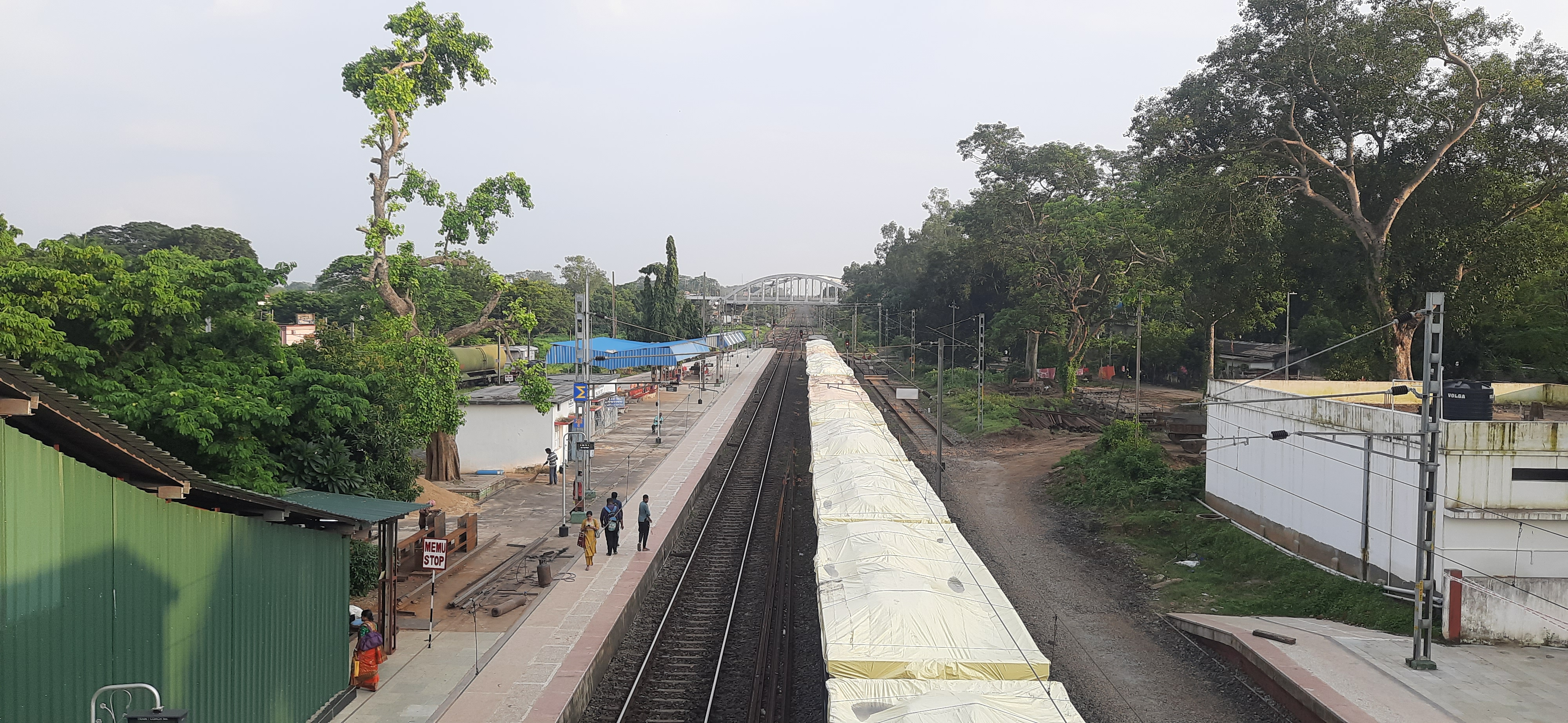
Bishnupur station with Maharaj Bir Hambir flyover in background

The Adra–Bheduasol sector was electrified in 1997–98, and the Bheduasol-Salboni sector in 1998–99.
