= Ramsagar railway station =

Railway Station in West Bengal

Ramsagar

General information
- Location: Ramsagar-Nakaijuri Road, Bar Magura, Ramsagar, Bankura district, West Bengal; India
- Coordinates: 23°06′22″N 86°16′37″E
- Elevation: 64 metres (210 ft)
- System: Indian Railway
- Owner: Indian railway
- Operator: South Eastern Railways
- Line: Kharagpur–Bankura–Adra line
- Platforms: 2
- Tracks: 2

Construction
- Structure type: At Ground

Other information
- Status: Functioning
- Station code: RSG
- Zone(s): South Eastern Railway
- Division(s): Adra

History
- Opened: 1903–04
- Former names: Bengal Nagpur Railway

Services
Preceding station	Indian Railways	Following station
Ondagram towards Adra Junction	South Eastern Railway zone Kharagpur–Bankura–Adra line	Bishnupur towards Kharagpur Junction
Location
- Location within West Bengal Location within India

Ramsagar railway station is a railway station on Kharagpur–Bankura–Adra line in Adra railway division of South Eastern Railway zone. It is situated beside Ramsagar–Nakaijuri Road at Bar Magura, Ramsagar of Bankura district in the Indian state of West Bengal.

== History ==
In 1901, the Kharagpur–Midnapur branch line was opened. The Midnapore–Jharia extension of the Bengal Nagpur Railway, passing through Bankura district was opened in 1903–04. The Adra–Bheduasol sector was electrified in 1997–98 and the Bheduasol–Salboni sector in 1998–99.
