= Metyal Sahar railway station =

Railway Station in West Bengal

Metyal Sahar

General information
- Location: Ragunathpur-Chhatna Road, Metyal Sohar, Purulia district, West Bengal; India
- Coordinates: 23°28′57″N 86°44′56″E
- Elevation: 179 metres (587 ft)
- System: Indian Railway
- Owner: Indian railway
- Operator: South Eastern Railways
- Line: Kharagpur–Bankura–Adra line
- Platforms: 2
- Tracks: 2

Construction
- Structure type: At Ground

Other information
- Status: Functional
- Station code: MYX
- Zone(s): South Eastern Railway
- Division(s): Adra railway division

History
- Opened: 1903–04
- Former names: Bengal Nagpur Railway

Services
Preceding station	Indian Railways	Following station
Adra Junction towards ?	South Eastern Railway zone Kharagpur–Bankura–Adra line	Indrabil towards ?
Location
- Location within West Bengal Location within India

Metyal Sahar railway station is a railway station on Kharagpur–Bankura–Adra line in Adra railway division of South Eastern Railway zone. It is situated beside Ragunathpur–Chhatna Road at Metyal Sohar of Purulia district in the Indian state of West Bengal.

== History ==
In 1901, the Kharagpur–Midnapur Branch line was opened. The Midnapore–Jharia extension of the Bengal Nagpur Railway, passing through Bankura District was opened in 1903–04. The Adra–Bheduasol sector was electrified in 1997–98 and the Bheduasol–Salboni sector in 1998–99.
