= Rupashi Bangla Express =

Train in India

Rupasi Bangla Express
Overview
- Service type: Superfast
- First service: 1 April 2000; 25 years ago
- Current operator: South Eastern Railway

Route
- Termini: Santragachi (SRC); Purulia (PRR)
- Stops: 10
- Distance travelled: 315 km (196 mi)
- Average journey time: 5 hours 37 minutes
- Service frequency: Daily. (Note: Runs seven days in a week for every direction.)
- Train number: 12883 / 12884

On-board services
- Classes: AC Chair Car, Non AC Chair Car, General Unreserved
- Seating arrangements: Yes
- Sleeping arrangements: Yes(New 3A added)
- Auto-rack arrangements: Overhead racks
- Catering facilities: E-catering
- Observation facilities: Large windows
- Baggage facilities: No
- Other facilities: Below the seats

Technical
- Rolling stock: LHB coach
- Track gauge: 1,676 mm (5 ft 6 in)
- Operating speed: 56 km/h (35 mph) average including halts.

The 12883 / 12884 Rupasi Bangla Express is a superfast express train belonging to South Eastern Railway zone that runs between Santragachi Junction and Purulia in India. It is currently being operated with 12883/12884 train numbers on a daily basis.

== Service ==
The 12883/Rupashi Bangla Express has an average speed of 60 km/h and covers 325 km in 5h 25m. The 12884/Rupashi Bangla Express has an average speed of 57 km/h and covers 325 km in 5h 40m. Currently there is talk within the Railways that the train's route would be changed .( Source : Locals of Purulia)

== Route and halts ==
The important halts of the train are:

- Kharagpur Junction
- Midnapore
- Bankura Junction
- Adra Junction

== Coach composition ==
The train has LHB rakes with max speed of 130 kmph. The train consists of 12 coaches :

- 1 AC 3-Tier
- 2 AC Chair Car
- 4 Chair Car(Reserved)
- 4 General Unreserved
- 1 Seating cum Luggage Rake
- 1 EOG

== Traction ==
Both trains are hauled by a Santragachi Loco Shed-based WAP-4 / WAP-7 and Aerodynamic WAP5 electric locomotives from Santragachi to Purulia and vice versa.

== See also ==
- Santragachi Junction railway station
- Bankura Junction railway station
- Aranyak Express
