= Nandan Kanan Express =

Train in India

Overview
- Service type: Superfast
- Locale: Odisha, West Bengal, Jharkhand, Bihar, Uttar Pradesh & Delhi
- First service: 1 December 2011; 14 years ago
- Current operator: East Coast Railway

Route
- Termini: Puri (PURI); Anand Vihar Terminal (ANVT)
- Stops: 29
- Distance travelled: 1,803 km (1,120 mi)
- Average journey time: 30 hours 10 minutes
- Service frequency: 4 days a week
- Train number: 12815 / 12816

On-board services
- Classes: AC First Class, AC 2 Tier, AC 3 Tier, Sleeper Class, General Unreserved
- Seating arrangements: Yes
- Sleeping arrangements: Yes
- Catering facilities: Available
- Observation facilities: Rake Sharing with 12875/12876 Neelachal Express
- Baggage facilities: No
- Other facilities: Below the seats

Technical
- Rolling stock: LHB coach
- Track gauge: 1,676 mm (5 ft 6 in)
- Operating speed: 60 km/h (37 mph) average including halts.

The 12815 / 12816 Nandan Kanan Express is an express train belonging to Indian Railways East Coast Railway zone that runs between Puri and Anand Vihar Terminal in India.

It operates as train number 12815 from Puri to Anand Vihar Terminal and as train number 12816 in the reverse direction, serving the states of Odisha, West Bengal, Jharkhand, Bihar, Uttar Pradesh, and Delhi. It is the Prince of East Coast Railway Zone

== Background ==
This train is named after the Nandankanan Zoological Park, a 400-hectare (990-acre) zoo and botanical garden in Bhubaneswar, Odisha, India. Established in 1960, it was opened to the public in 1979 and became the first zoo in India to join World Association of Zoos and Aquariums (WAZA) in 2009. It also contains a botanical garden and part of it has been declared a sanctuary. Nandankanan, literally meaning The Garden of Heaven, is located near the capital city, Bhubaneswar, in the environs of the Chandaka forest, and includes the 134-acre (54 ha) Kanjia lake.

== Coaches ==
The 12815 / 12816 Nandan Kanan Express has 1 AC First Class, 2 AC 2 Tier, 6 AC 3-tier, 7 sleeper class, 2 General unreserved, 1 Divyangjan Coach and 1 EOG (Generator cum brake van). It carries a pantry car.

As is customary with most train services in India, coach composition may be amended at the discretion of Indian Railways depending on demand.

== Service ==
The 12815 Puri–Anand Vihar Terminal Nandan Kanan Express covers the distance of 1,797 km (1,117 mi) in 30 hours 10 mins (60 km/h) and in 29 hours 40 mins as the 12816 Anand Vihar Terminal–Puri Nandan Kanan Express (61 km/h).

As the average speed of the train is slightly above 55 km/h (34 mph), as per railway rules, its fare includes a Superfast surcharge.

This Train runs from New Delhi till May 2018 but changed to Anand Vihar Terminal instead of New Delhi.

== Routing ==
The 12815 / 16 Nandan Kanan Express runs from Puri via Khurda Road, Bhubaneswar, Cuttack, Hijli, Bankura Junction, Adra Junction, Bhaga, Gomoh Junction, Koderma Junction, Gaya Junction, Pandit Deen Dayal Upadhyaya Junction, Allahabad Junction, Kanpur Central, to Anand Vihar Terminal.

== Traction ==
As the route is fully electrified, a Ghaziabad Loco Shed based WAP-7 electric locomotive powers the train from Puri to Anand Vihar Terminal.
