= Garbeta railway station =

Railway Station in West Bengal, India

GARBETA

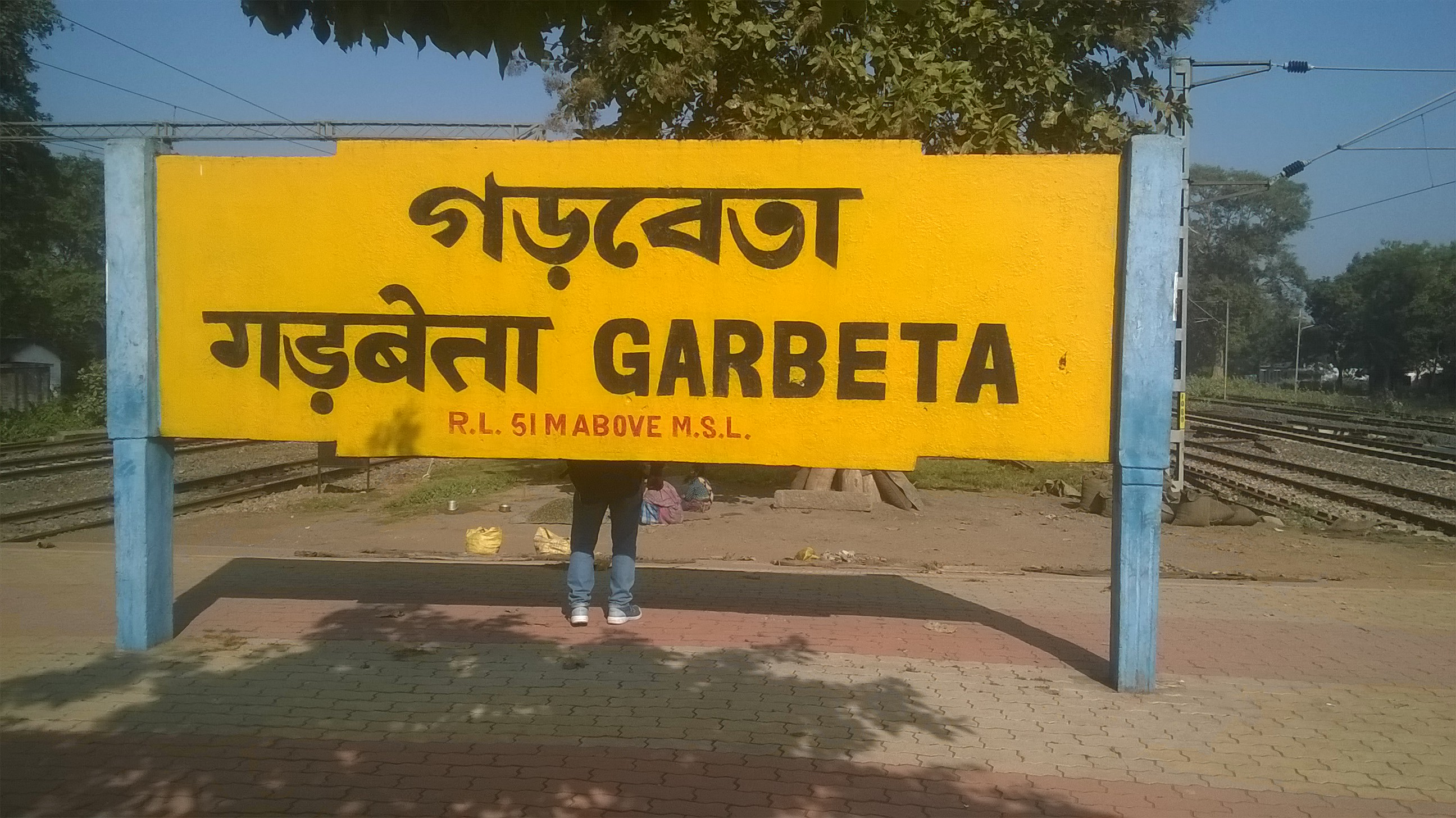

General information
- Location: Bandhgora, Garbeta, Paschim Medinipur district, West Bengal; India
- Coordinates: 22°50′40″N 87°19′15″E
- Elevation: 58 metres (190 ft)
- System: Indian Railway
- Owner: Indian railway
- Operator: South Eastern Railways
- Line: Kharagpur–Bankura–Adra line
- Platforms: 2
- Tracks: 2

Construction
- Structure type: At Ground

Other information
- Status: Functioning
- Station code: GBA
- Zone(s): South Eastern Railway
- Division(s): Adra

History
- Opened: 1903–04
- Former names: Bengal Nagpur Railway

Services
Preceding station	Indian Railways	Following station
Bogri Road towards Adra Junction	South Eastern Railway zone Kharagpur–Bankura–Adra line	Chandrakona Road towards Kharagpur Junction
Location
- Location within India Location within West Bengal
- Interactive map of Garbeta

Garbeta railway station is a railway station on Kharagpur–Bankura–Adra line in Adra railway division of South Eastern Railway zone. It is situated at Bandhgora, Garbeta of Paschim Medinipur district in the Indian state of West Bengal. A total of 23 passenger and express trains stop at Garbeta railway station.

== History ==
In 1901, the Kharagpur–Midnapur Branch line was opened. The Midnapore–Jharia extension of the Bengal Nagpur Railway, passing through Bankura District was opened in 1903–04. The Adra–Bheduasol sector was electrified in 1997–98 and the Bheduasol–Salboni sector in 1998–99.
