= Bhubaneswar–New Delhi Duronto Express =

Bhubaneswar – New Delhi Duronto Express
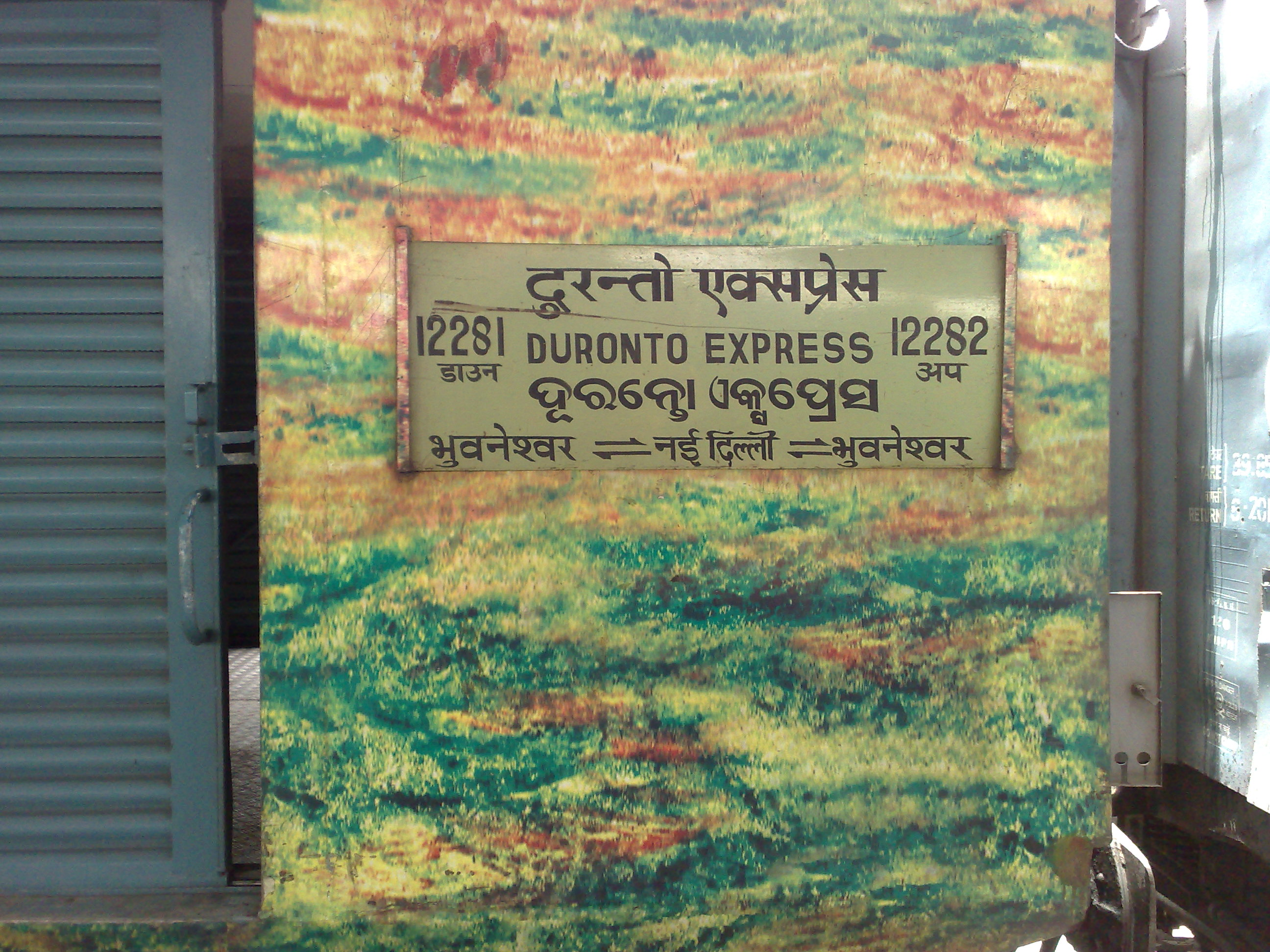

Overview
- Service type: Duronto Express
- Locale: Odisha, Bihar, Uttar Pradesh & Delhi
- First service: 4 April 2010
- Current operator: East Coast Railway

Route
- Termini: Bhubaneswar (BBS); New Delhi (NDLS)
- Stops: 6
- Distance travelled: 1,724 km (1,071 mi)
- Average journey time: 21 hours 50 minutes
- Service frequency: Once a week
- Train number: 12281 / 12282

On-board services
- Classes: AC 1st Class, AC 2 Tier, AC 3 Tier, Sleeper
- Seating arrangements: No
- Sleeping arrangements: Yes
- Catering facilities: Pantry car coach attached

Technical
- Rolling stock: LHB coach
- Track gauge: 1,676 mm (5 ft 6 in)
- Operating speed: 78 km/h (48 mph) average with halts

The 12281 / 12282 Bhubaneswar Duronto Express is a once-a-week weekly train which runs between Bhubaneswar, capital of Odisha and New Delhi in Delhi . This train was introduced as part of the Duronto Express trains that were announced by the then railways minister Mamata Banerjee in 2010-2011 rail budget. It is operated by East Coast Railway.

This train consists of total 17 no. of bogies out of which there are 4 no. of sleepers (S1-S8), 2 first class AC coach (H1), eight 2-tier AC coach (A1), five 3-tier AC coaches (B1-B4), one pantry car and 2 no.s of SLR bogies each at both the ends. It uses LHB coach. It is the fastest train from new delhi to bhubaneswar covering in 23 hours and 50 minutes .

It has Rake sharing with 22806/05 Anand Vihar Terminal Bhubaneswar Weekly Superfast Express.

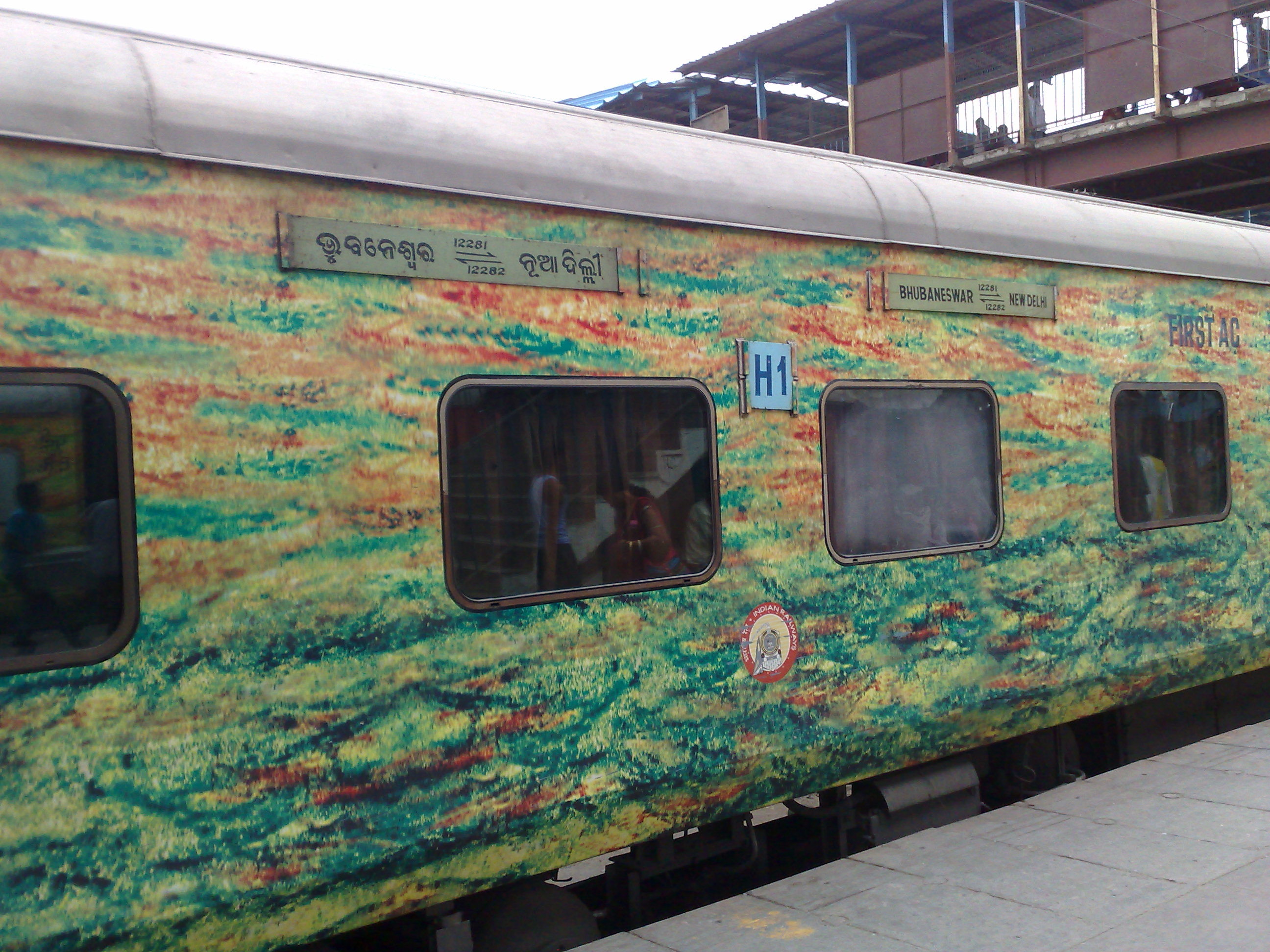
Bhubaneswar Duronto Express – AC First Class coach

== Time Table ==
12281 train starts from Bhubaneswar (BBS) every Wednesday at 08:00 AM and reach to New Delhi (NDLS) at 06:25 AM next day.

12282 train starts from New Delhi (NDLS) every Thursday at 12:55 PM and reach back to Bhubaneswar (BBS) at 10:45 AM next day.

== Stoppages ==
Its halts are,

- Balasore
- Adra
- Gaya Junction
- Pt. Deen Dayal Upadhyay Jn.
- Kanpur Central

== Loco Link ==
Bhubaneswar – New Delhi Duronto Express is hauled by a Ghaziabad-based WAP 7 locomotive on its entire journey.

== Gallery ==
New Delhi-Bhubaneswar Duronto express at Balasore with Ghaziabad WAP-4
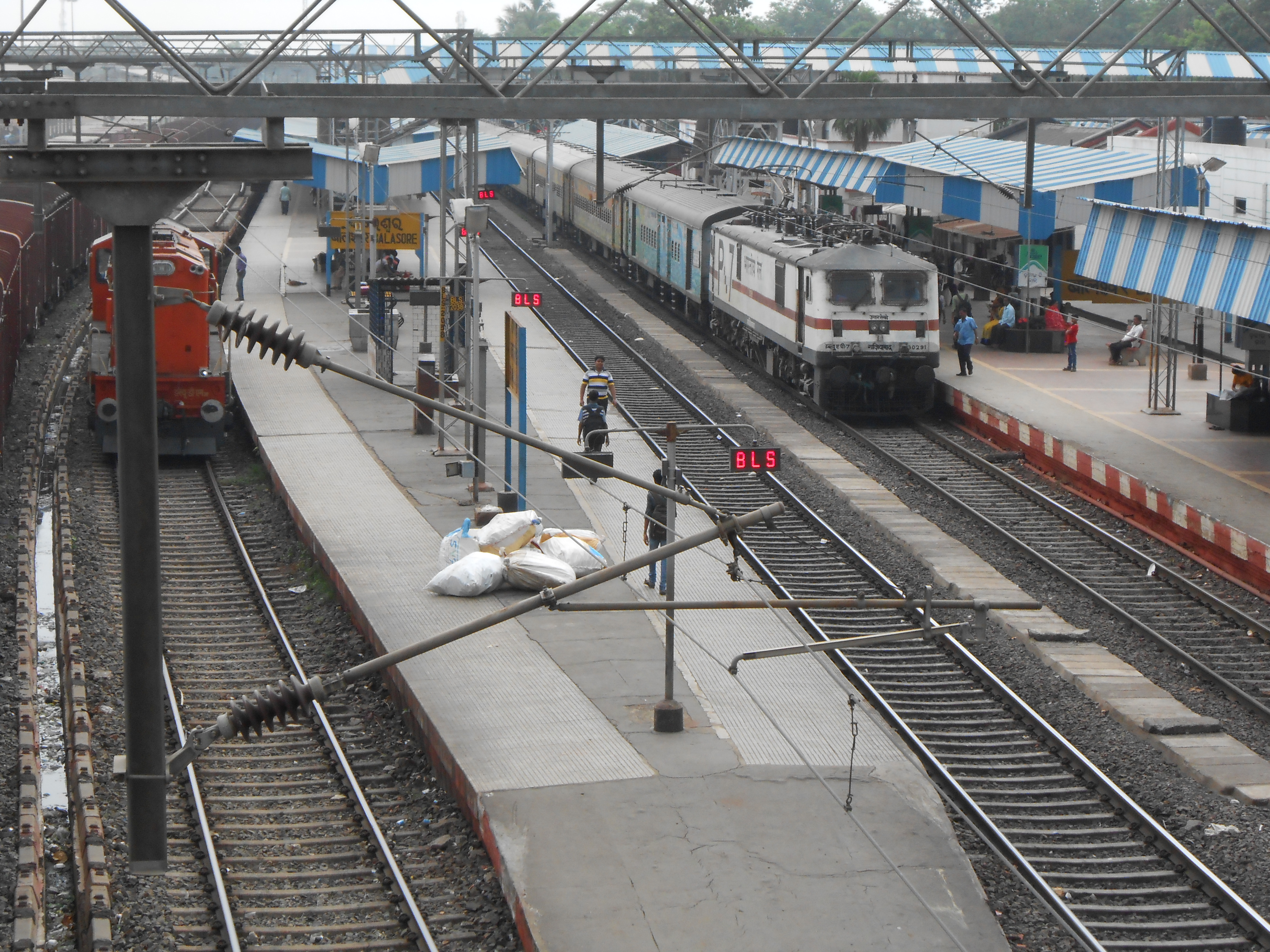
New Delhi-Bhubaneswar Duronto Express with Ghaziabad WAP-7 at Balasore

== See also ==
- Types of Passenger Services
- Types of Accommodation
- East Coast Railway Zone
