= Salboni railway station =

Railway Station in West Bengal, India

Salboni
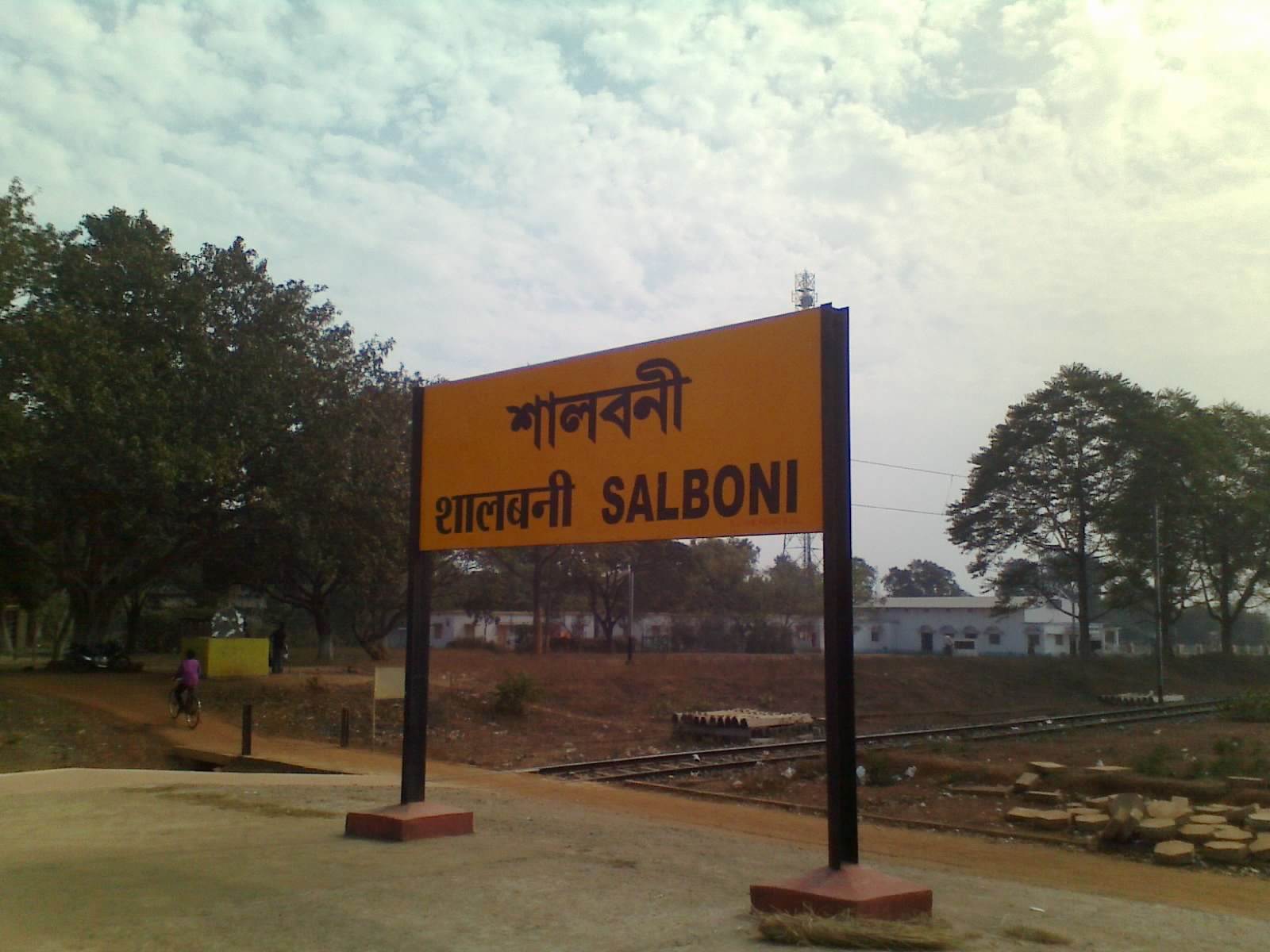

General information
- Location: National Highway 14, Salboni, Paschim Medinipur district, West Bengal; India
- Coordinates: 22°38′27″N 87°19′19″E
- Elevation: 42 metres (138 ft)
- System: Indian Railway
- Owner: Indian railway
- Operator: South Eastern Railways
- Line: Kharagpur–Bankura–Adra line
- Platforms: 3
- Tracks: 4

Construction
- Structure type: At Ground
- Parking: Yes

Other information
- Status: Functioning
- Station code: SLB
- Zone(s): South Eastern Railway
- Division(s): Adra railway division

History
- Opened: 1903–04
- Former names: Bengal Nagpur Railway

Services
Preceding station	Indian Railways	Following station
Chandrakona Road towards Adra Junction	South Eastern Railway zone Kharagpur–Bankura–Adra line	Godapiasal towards Kharagpur Junction
Location
- Location within West Bengal Location within India

Salboni railway station is a railway station on Kharagpur–Bankura–Adra line in Adra railway division of South Eastern Railway zone. It is situated beside National Highway 14 at Salboni of Paschim Medinipur district in the Indian state of West Bengal. Total 14 Express and Passengers trains stop at Salboni railway station.

== History ==
In 1901, the Kharagpur–Midnapur Branch line was opened. The Midnapore–Jharia extension of the Bengal Nagpur Railway, passing through Bankura District was opened in 1903–04. The Adra–Bheduasol sector was electrified in 1997–98 and the Bheduasol–Salboni sector in 1998–99.
