= Digha–Malda Town Express =

Overview
- Service type: Express
- Locale: 19 February 2012; 14 years ago
- Current operator: Eastern Railway zone

Route
- Termini: Digha (DGHA); Malda Town (MLDT)
- Stops: 15
- Distance travelled: 656 km (408 mi)
- Average journey time: 14h 30m
- Service frequency: Weekly (Note: Runs one day in a week for every direction.)
- Train number: 13417/13418

On-board services
- Classes: 1 AC lll Tier, 3 Sleeper class, 8 General Unreserved
- Seating arrangements: Yes (Only for day Journey)
- Sleeping arrangements: Yes
- Catering facilities: On-board catering E-catering
- Observation facilities: ICF coach
- Entertainment facilities: No
- Baggage facilities: No
- Other facilities: Below the seats

Technical
- Rolling stock: 2
- Track gauge: 1,676 mm (5 ft 6 in)
- Operating speed: 45 km/h (28 mph), including halts

The Digha–Malda Town Express is an Express train belonging to Eastern Railway zone that runs between Malda Town and Digha in India via Tamluk, Kharagpur, Bankura, Asansol, Siuri, Rampurhat. It is currently being operated with 13417/13418 train numbers on a weekly basis.

== Service ==
The 13417/Digha–Malda Town Express has an average speed of 45 km/h and covers 656 km in 14h 30m. The 13418/Malda Town–Digha Express has an average speed of 44 km/h and covers 656 km in 10h 35m.

== Route and stops ==
The important stops of the train are:

- Digha
- Kanthi PH
- Tamluk Junction
- Panskura Junction
- Kharagpur Junction
- Midnapore
- Bishnupur
- Bankura Junction
- Adra Junction
- Asansol Junction
- Andal Junction
- Durgapur
- Siuri
- Rampurhat Junction
- Pakur
- New Farakka Junction
- Malda Town

Note: Bold letters indicates Major Railway Stations/Major Cities.

== Coach composition ==
The train has standard ICF rakes with a maximum speed of 110 km/h. The train consists of 12 coaches:

- 1 AC III Tier
- 3 sleeper coaches
- 6 general
- 2 seating cum luggage rake

== Traction ==
Both trains are hauled by an Asansol Loco Shed-based WAM-4 electric locomotive from Digha to Durgapur and thence by an Andal Loco Shed-based WDM-3A diesel locomotive to Malda Town and back.

== Direction reversal ==
Train reverses its direction:

- Durgapur

== Rake sharing ==
The train shares its rake with 13425/13426 Surat-Malda Town Express

== See also ==
- Malda Town railway station
- Digha railway station
- Surat-Malda Town Express
- Howrah–Digha Super AC Express
- Paharia Express
