= Puri–Jaynagar Express =

Indian Express train

Puri Jaynagar Express
Overview
- Service type: Express
- Current operator: East Coast Railway zone

Route
- Termini: Puri; Jaynagar
- Stops: 23
- Distance travelled: 1,002 km (623 mi)
- Average journey time: 23 hours
- Service frequency: Weekly
- Train number: 18419 / 18420

On-board services
- Classes: AC 2 Tier, AC 3 Tier, Sleeper class & General Unreserved
- Seating arrangements: Yes
- Sleeping arrangements: Yes

Technical
- Rolling stock: Standard Indian Railways coaches
- Track gauge: 1,676 mm (5 ft 6 in)
- Operating speed: 44 km/h (27 mph)
Route map
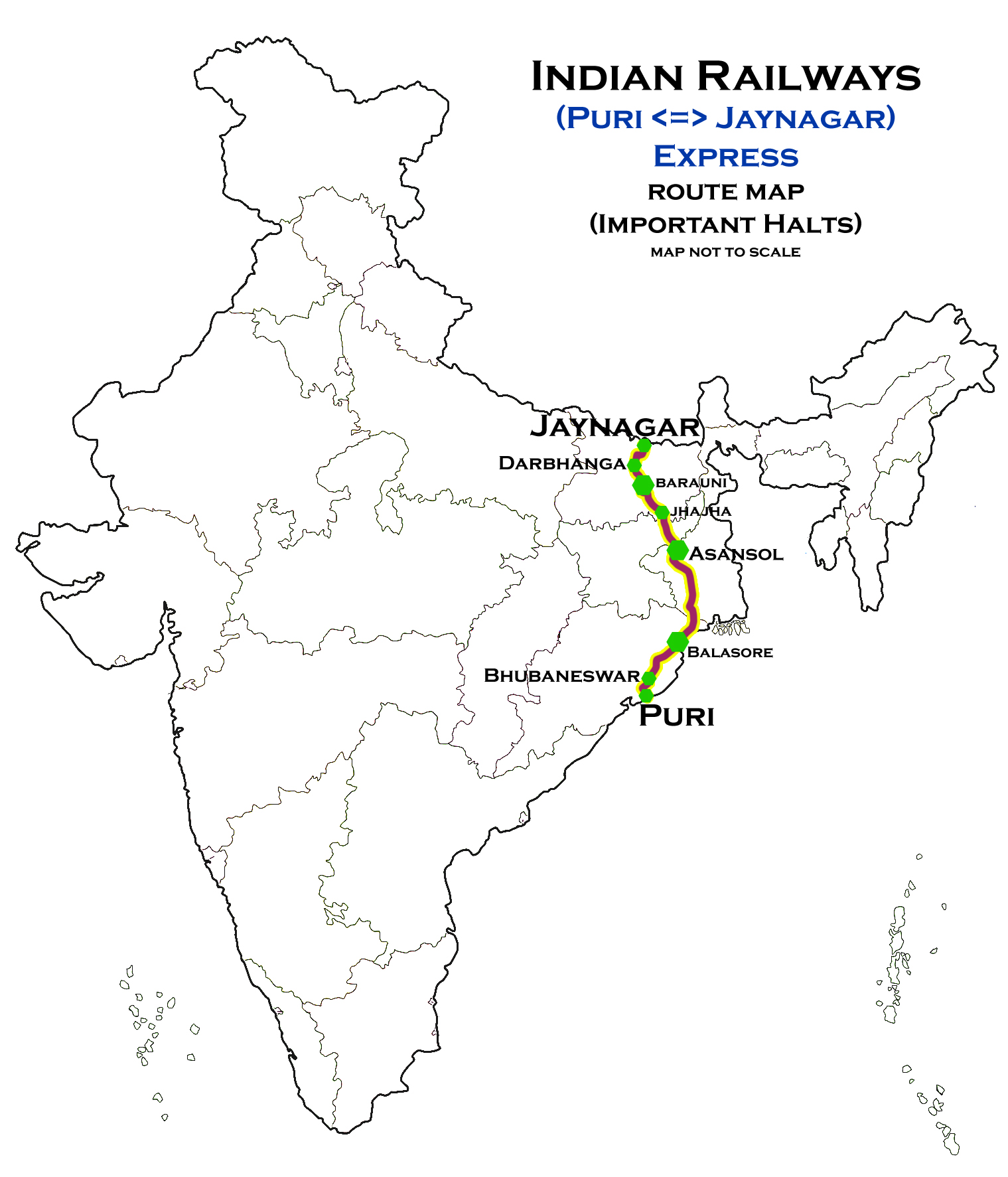

18419 / 20 Puri–Jaynagar Express is an Express train belonging to Indian Railways East Coast Railway zone that runs between Puri and Jaynagar in India.

== Service ==
It operates as train number 18419 from Puri to Jaynagar and as train number 18420 in the reverse direction, serving the states of Odisha, West Bengal, Jharkhand and Bihar. The train covers the distance of 1,002 km (623 mi) in 23 hours 00 mins approximately at a speed of (44 km/h (27 mph)).

== Schedule ==
Train number	Station code	Departure station	Departure time	Departure day	Arrival station	Arrival time	Arrival day
18419	PURI	Puri	2:25 PM	THU	Jaynagar	1:35 PM	FRI
18420	JYG	Jaynagar	05:10 AM	SAT	Puri	3:20 AM	SUN

== Coaches ==
The 18419 / 20 Puri–Jaynagar Express has one AC 2-tier, three AC 3-tier, nine sleeper class, seven general unreserved & two SLR (seating with luggage rake) coaches. It doesn't carries a pantry car.

As with most train services in India, coach composition may be amended at the discretion of Indian Railways depending on demand.

== RSA – Rake sharing ==
22827/22828 – Puri–Surat Express

== Reversals ==
ASN – Asansol Junction

== Routing ==
The 18419 / 20 Puri–Jaynagar Express runs from Puri via Khurda Road Junction, Bhubaneswar, Cuttack Junction, Balasore, Adra Junction, Asansol Junction, Madhupur Junction, Barauni Junction, and Samastipur Junction to Jaynagar.

== Traction ==
As this route is going to be electrified, an Asansol-based electric WAG-5P locomotive pulls the train to Samastipur Junction, and later a Samastipur-based WDM-3A pulls the train to its destination.
