= Howrah–Purulia Express =

Train in India

Howrah-Purulia Superfast Express
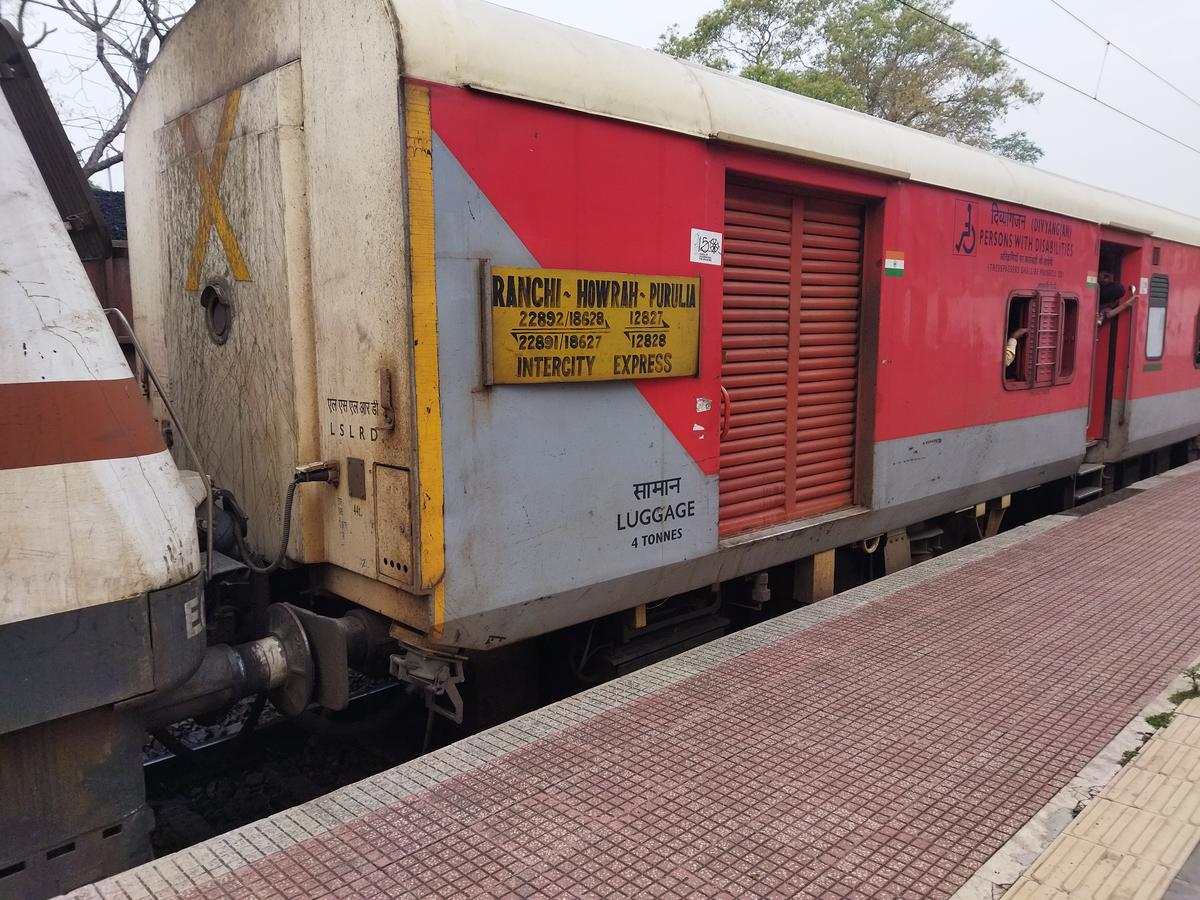
- Howrah-Purulia Superfast Express train board.

Overview
- Service type: Superfast
- Status: Active
- Locale: West Bengal
- First service: 15 December 1983; 42 years ago
- Current operator: South Eastern Railway

Route
- Termini: Purulia Junction (PRR); Howrah Junction (HWH)
- Stops: 12
- Distance travelled: 323 km (201 mi)
- Average journey time: 5 hours 50 minutes
- Service frequency: Daily
- Train number: 12827 / 12828

On-board services
- Classes: AC 3 Tier (3A), AC 3 Tier Economy (3E), AC Chair Car (CC), Second Class Seating (2S), General Unreserved (GS/UR)
- Seating arrangements: Yes
- Sleeping arrangements: Yes
- Auto-rack arrangements: Overhead racks
- Catering facilities: On-board catering, E-catering
- Observation facilities: Large windows
- Baggage facilities: No
- Other facilities: Below the seats

Technical
- Rolling stock: LHB coach
- Track gauge: Broad Gauge
- Operating speed: 55 km/h (34 mph) average including halts.

The 12827 / 12828 Howrah–Purulia Superfast Express is a Superfast Express train of Indian Railways – South Eastern Railway zone that runs between Howrah Junction and Purulia Junction in India.

It operates as train number 12827 from Howrah Junction to Purulia Junction and as train number 12828 in the reverse direction, serving the state of West Bengal.

== Coaches ==
The 12827 / 28 Howrah–Purulia Express presently has 2 AC 3 Tier (3A), 1 AC 3 Tier Economy (3E), 2 AC Chair Cars (CC), 8 Chair Car Reserved seating (2S), 4 General Unreserved (GS/UR), and 1 EOG and 1 LHB Seating cum Luggage Rake (LWSLR) coaches. It does not carry a pantry car.

As with most trains in India, coach composition is changed at the discretion of Indian Railways depending on demand.

== Service ==
The 12827 Howrah–Purulia Express covers the distance of 323 kilometres in 05 hours 30 mins (58.73 km/h) and in 05 hours 50 mins as 12828 Purulia–Howrah Express (55.37 km/h).

As the average speed of the train is above 55 km/h (34 mph), as per Indian Railways rules, its fare includes a Superfast surcharge.

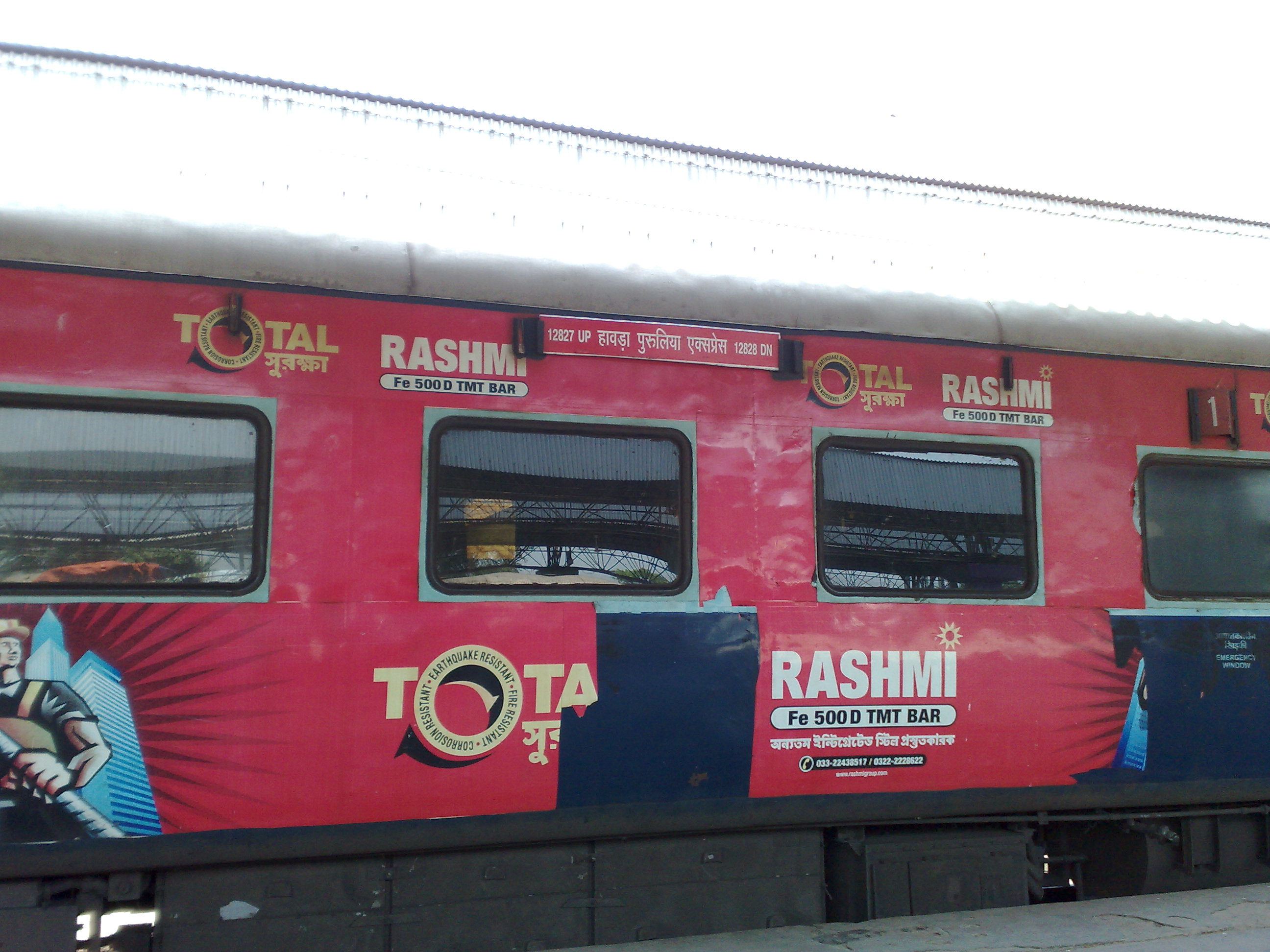
12828 Purulia Howrah Express – AC Chair Car

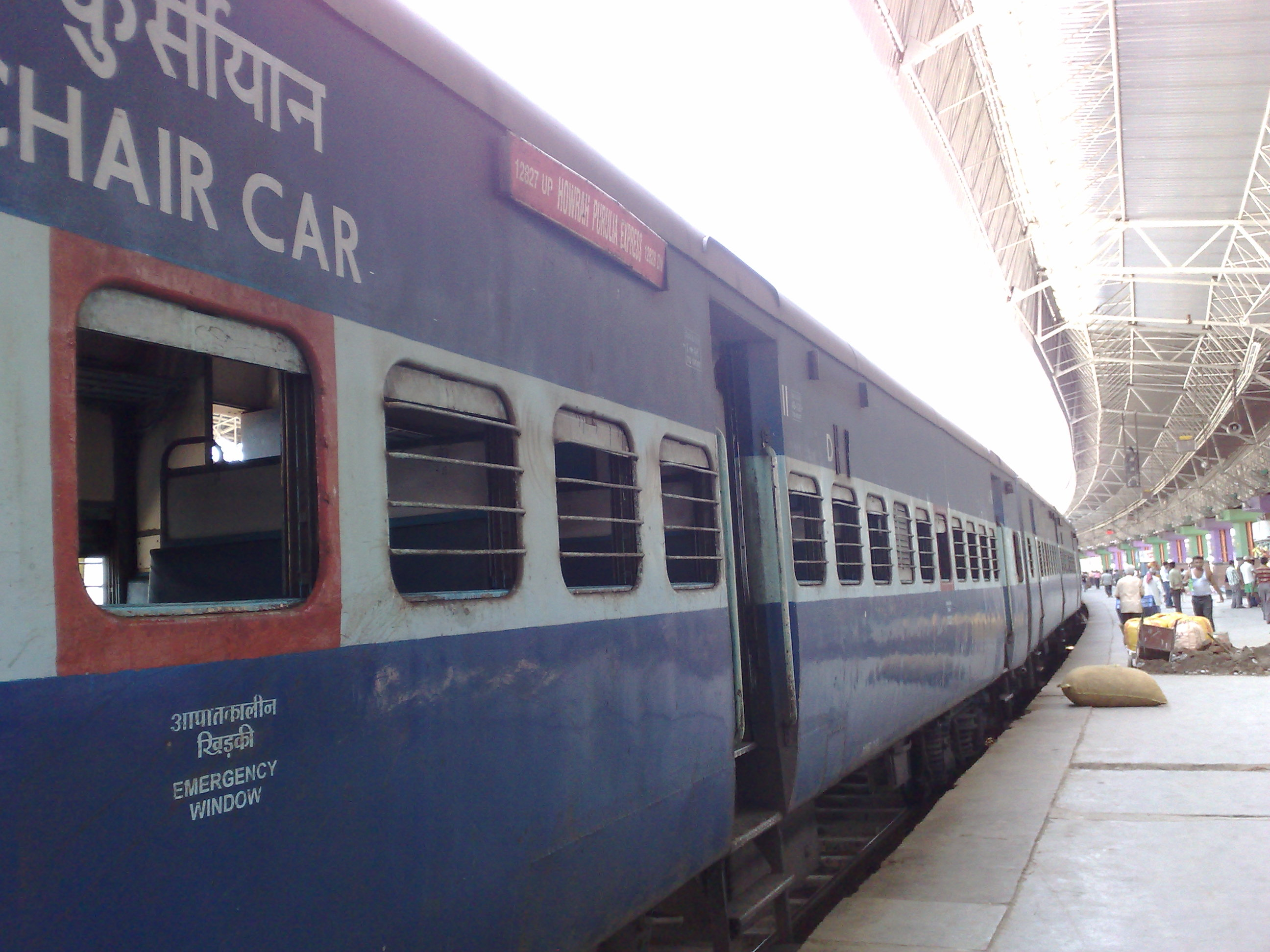
12828 Purulia Howrah Express – Chair Car

== Routing ==
The 12827 / 28 Howrah–Purulia Express leaves Howrah Junction at 16:50 every day. It stops at Kharagpur Junction, Bankura Junction, Adra Junction, and at few other stations before reaching Purulia Junction at 22:20. The return train leaves Purulia Junction at 05:30 and reaches Howrah at 11:20.

== Traction ==
As the route is fully electrified, a Tatanagar Loco Shed or Santragachi Loco Shed-based WAP-7 or WAP-4 electric locomotive powers the train for its entire journey.

== Timings ==
12828 Purulia–Howrah Express leaves Purulia Junction on a daily basis at 05:30 hrs IST and reaches Howrah Junction at 11:22 hrs IST the same day.

12827 Howrah–Purulia Express leaves Howrah Junction on a daily basis at 16:50 hrs IST and reaches Purulia Junction at 22:30 hrs IST the same day.
