= Howrah–Ranchi Intercity Express (via Tatanagar) =

Train in India

Howrah Junction – Ranchi Junction Intercity Superfast Express
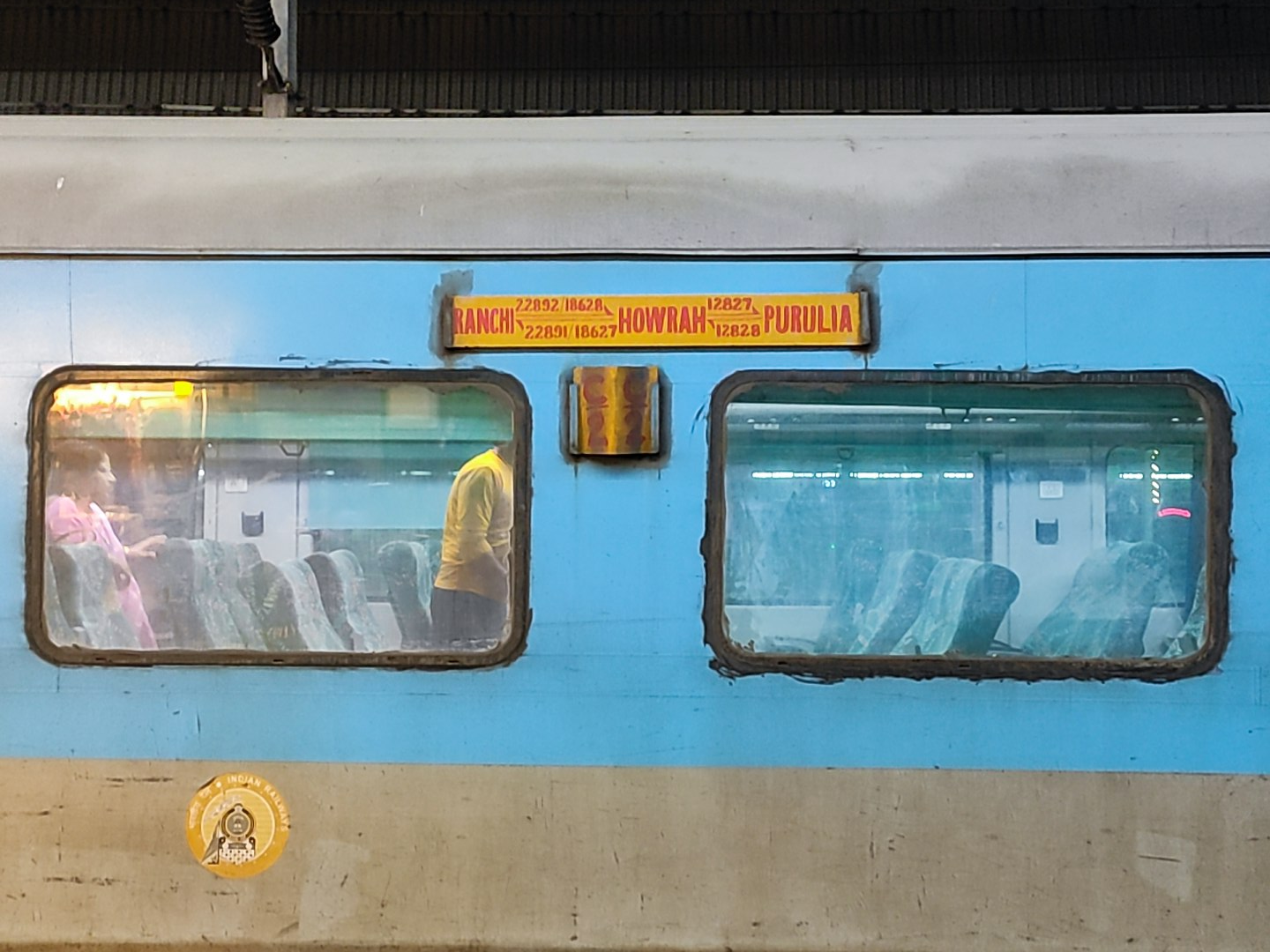

Overview
- Service type: Superfast
- Status: Active
- Locale: West Bengal & Jharkhand
- First service: 7 September 2009; 16 years ago
- Current operator: South Eastern Railway

Route
- Termini: Howrah Junction (HWH); Ranchi Junction (RNC)
- Stops: 12
- Distance travelled: 460 km (286 mi)
- Average journey time: 8 hrs 5 mins
- Service frequency: Tri-weekly
- Train number: 22891 / 22892

On-board services
- Classes: AC Chair Car, Second Class Seating, General Unreserved
- Seating arrangements: Yes
- Sleeping arrangements: No
- Auto-rack arrangements: Overhead racks
- Catering facilities: On-board catering, E-catering
- Observation facilities: Large windows
- Baggage facilities: No
- Other facilities: Below the seats

Technical
- Rolling stock: LHB coach
- Track gauge: 1,676 mm (5 ft 6 in)
- Operating speed: 56 km/h (35 mph) average including halts.

The 22891 / 22892 Howrah–Ranchi Intercity Superfast Express is an Superfast Intercity train belonging to South Eastern Railway zone that runs between Howrah Junction and Ranchi Junction. It is currently being operated with 22891/22892 train numbers on tri-weekly basis.

== Service ==
- The 22891/Howrah–Ranchi Intercity SF Express has an average speed of 57 km/h (35 mph) and covers 460 km (290 mi) in 8h 5m.
- The 22892/Ranchi–Howrah Intercity SF Express has an average speed of 56 km/h (35 mph) and covers 460 km (290 mi) in 8h 10m.

== Route and halts ==
- Howrah Junction
- Kharagpur Junction
- Tatanagar Junction
- Purulia Junction
- Muri Junction
- Ranchi Junction

== Coach composition ==
The train has standard LHB rakes with max speed of 130 km/h (81 mph). The train consists of 14 coaches:

- 2 AC chair car
- 1 AC 3 tier
- 5 second sitting
- 5 general unreserved
- 2 second-class luggage/parcel van

== Traction ==
Both trains are hauled by a Santragachi Loco Shed or Tatanagar Loco Shed-based WAP-7 electric locomotive from Howrah to Ranchi and vice versa.

== Notes ==
Runs three days a week in both directions.
