= Ernakulam–Patna Superfast Express =

Train in India

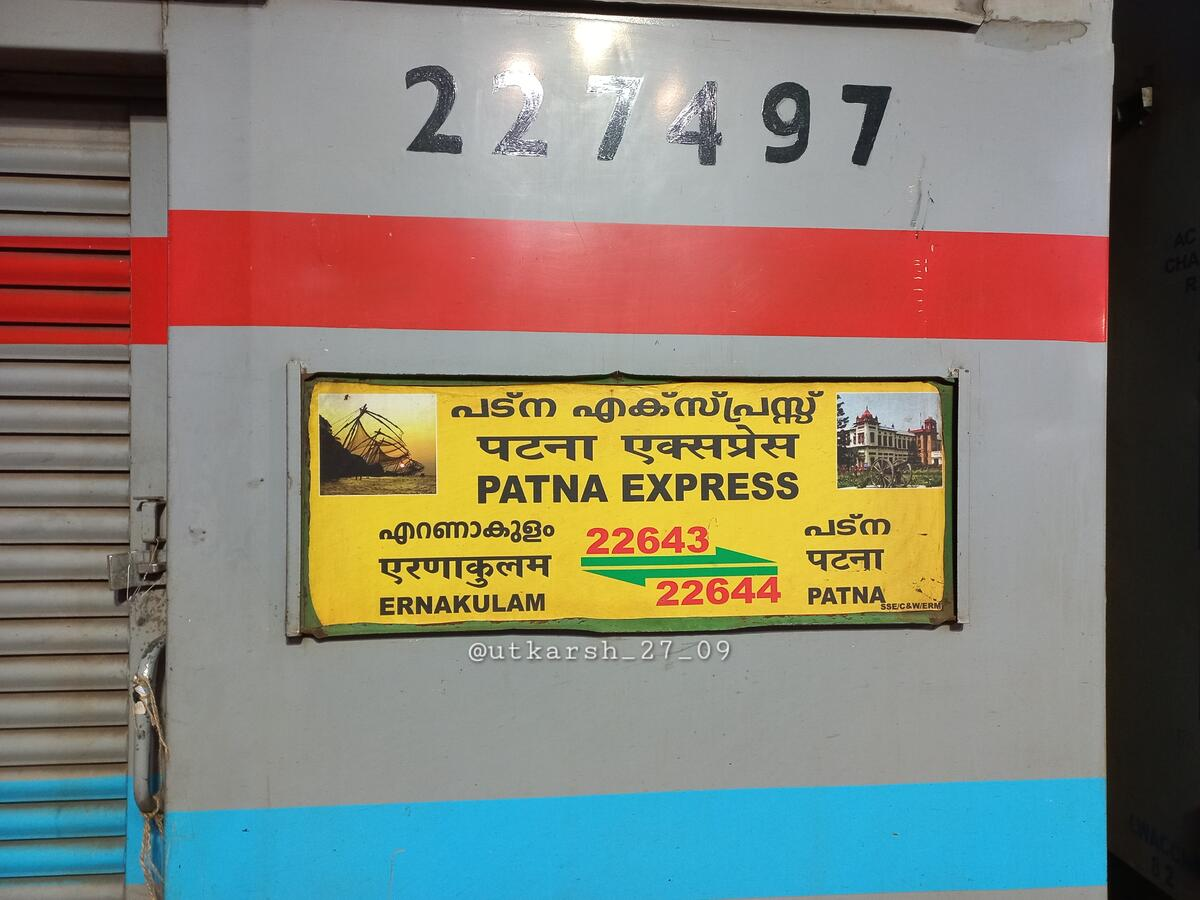
- Ernakulam–Patna SF Exp Train Board

Overview
- Service type: Superfast
- Status: Active
- First service: 1 May 1989; 37 years ago
- Current operator: Southern Railway

Route
- Termini: Ernakulam (ERS); Patna Junction (PNBE)
- Stops: 43
- Distance travelled: 2,788 km (1,732 mi)
- Average journey time: 50 hours 40 mins
- Service frequency: Bi-weekly
- Train number: 22643 / 22644

On-board services
- Classes: AC 2 Tier, AC 3 Tier, Sleeper Class, General Unreserved
- Seating arrangements: Yes
- Sleeping arrangements: Yes
- Catering facilities: Available
- Observation facilities: Large windows
- Baggage facilities: Available
- Other facilities: Below the seats

Technical
- Rolling stock: LHB coach
- Track gauge: 1,676 mm (5 ft 6 in)
- Operating speed: 55 km/h (34 mph) average including halts.

The 22643 / 22644 Ernakulam–Patna Superfast Express is an express train belonging to Indian Railways southern zone that runs between Ernakulam Junction and Patna Junction in India.

Varanasi-Tirupati Express was extended (on one day) to/from Cochin with effect from 1-11-1989

It operates as train number 22643 from Ernakulam Junction to Patna Junction and as train number 22644 in the reverse direction, serving the states of Tamil Nadu, Kerala, Andhra Pradesh, Odisha, West Bengal, Jharkhand and Bihar.

== Rake sharing ==
It has rake sharing with 12683/4 Ernakulam–Sir M Visvesvaraya Terminal Superfast Express and 16337/8 Ernakulam–Okha Express. It is maintained at Ernakulam (ERMCD) and uses 4 rakes alongside its RSA.

== Coach composition ==
The train has standard LHB rakes with a maximum speed of 130 km/h. The train consists of 22 coaches. It was hauled by WAP-7 or WDP-4B

- 2 AC II Tier
- 3 AC III Tier
- 12 Sleeper coaches
- 2 General Unreserved
- 1 Seating cum Luggage Rake
- 1 Pantry Car
- 1 Generator Car
