= Aranyak Express =

Train in India

Overview
- Service type: Superfast
- Locale: West Bengal & Jharkhand
- First service: 1 April 2000; 25 years ago
- Current operator: South Eastern Railway

Route
- Termini: Kolkata Shalimar (SHM); Bhojudih (BJE)
- Stops: 12
- Distance travelled: 311 km (193 mi)
- Average journey time: 5 hours 20 minutes
- Service frequency: Daily
- Train number: 12885 / 12886

On-board services
- Classes: AC Chair Car, Chair Car, General Unreserved, Sleeper Class
- Seating arrangements: Yes
- Sleeping arrangements: Yes
- Auto-rack arrangements: Overhead racks
- Catering facilities: E-catering
- Observation facilities: Large windows
- Baggage facilities: No
- Other facilities: Below the seats

Technical
- Rolling stock: LHB coach
- Track gauge: 1,676 mm (5 ft 6 in)
- Operating speed: 60 km/h (37 mph) average including halts.

The 12885 / 12886 Aranyak Express is a superfast express train run by Indian Railways which connects the city of Kolkata (Shalimar) with Bhojudih. It operates daily except on Sunday. It travels the 311 km at an average speed of 56–58 km/h. It was originally Shalimar - Santaldih Aranyak Express. Recently it was extended to Bhojudih in Jharkhand State.

The Aranyak Express is hauled by Indian Railways WAP-4 class locomotives. Chair Car requires advance booking, whereas general coaches can be boarded with a general daily ticket. The Tatkal scheme is available in this train.

== Service ==
1. 12885 Shalimar (7:45 A.M.) Bhojudih (1:05 P.M. same day)
2. 12886 Bhojudih (1:25 P.M.) Shalimar (7:00 P.M. same day)

== Traction ==
It is regularly hauls by a Santragachi-based WAP-4 locomotive on its entire journey.
