= Adra Junction railway station =

Railway station in West Bengal, India

ADRA JUNCTION আদ্রা জংশন

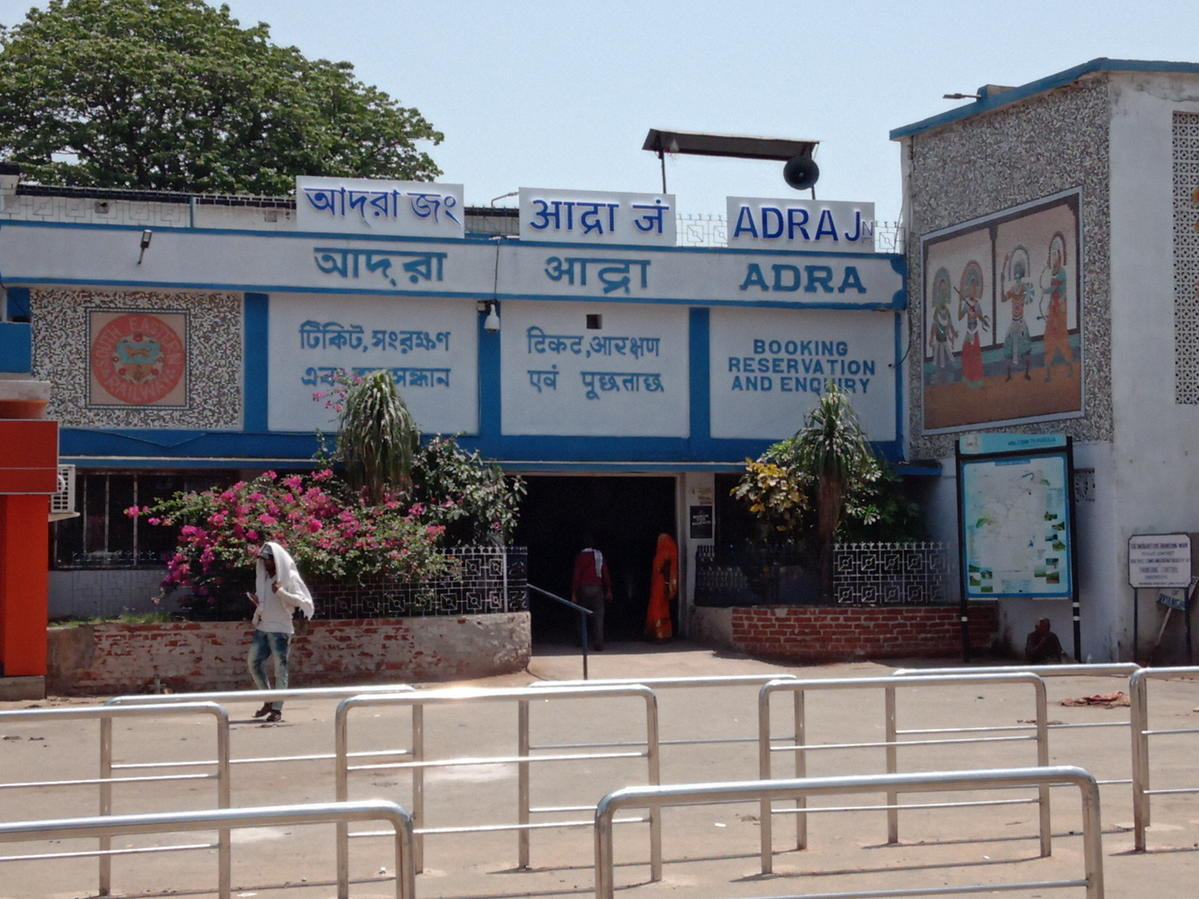
- Adra Junction rail station building

General information
- Location: Adra Town, station road, Raghunathpur and Kashipur block area, Purulia district, West Bengal; India
- Coordinates: 23°29′46″N 86°40′26″E
- Elevation: 185 metres (607 ft)
- System: Indian Railways
- Operator: South Eastern Railways
- Lines: Kharagpur–Bankura–Adra line; Asansol–Tatanagar–Kharagpur line; Railways in Jharia Coalfield
- Platforms: 4 platforms Length– 600–700 m (2,000–2,300 ft)
- Tracks: 8 (excluding Yard)
- Connections: Raghunathpur, Kashipur, Purulia

Construction
- Structure type: At grade
- Parking: Available
- Accessible: Yes

Other information
- Status: Functional
- Station code: ADRA
- Zone(s): South Eastern Railway
- Division(s): Adra
- Website: www.irctc.co.in/nget/train-search

History
- Opened: 1887
- Rebuilt: 1904
- Electrified: 1961–62 [First electrified functional line in Adra division]
- Former names: Bengal Nagpur Railway

Passengers
- More than 2.5 million
Services
Preceding station	Indian Railways	Following station
Garhdhrubeswar Terminus	South Eastern Railway zone Kharagpur–Bankura–Adra line	Metyal Sahar towards Kharagpur Junction
Route map
Location
- Location within India Location within West Bengal Location within India
- Interactive map of Adra Junction

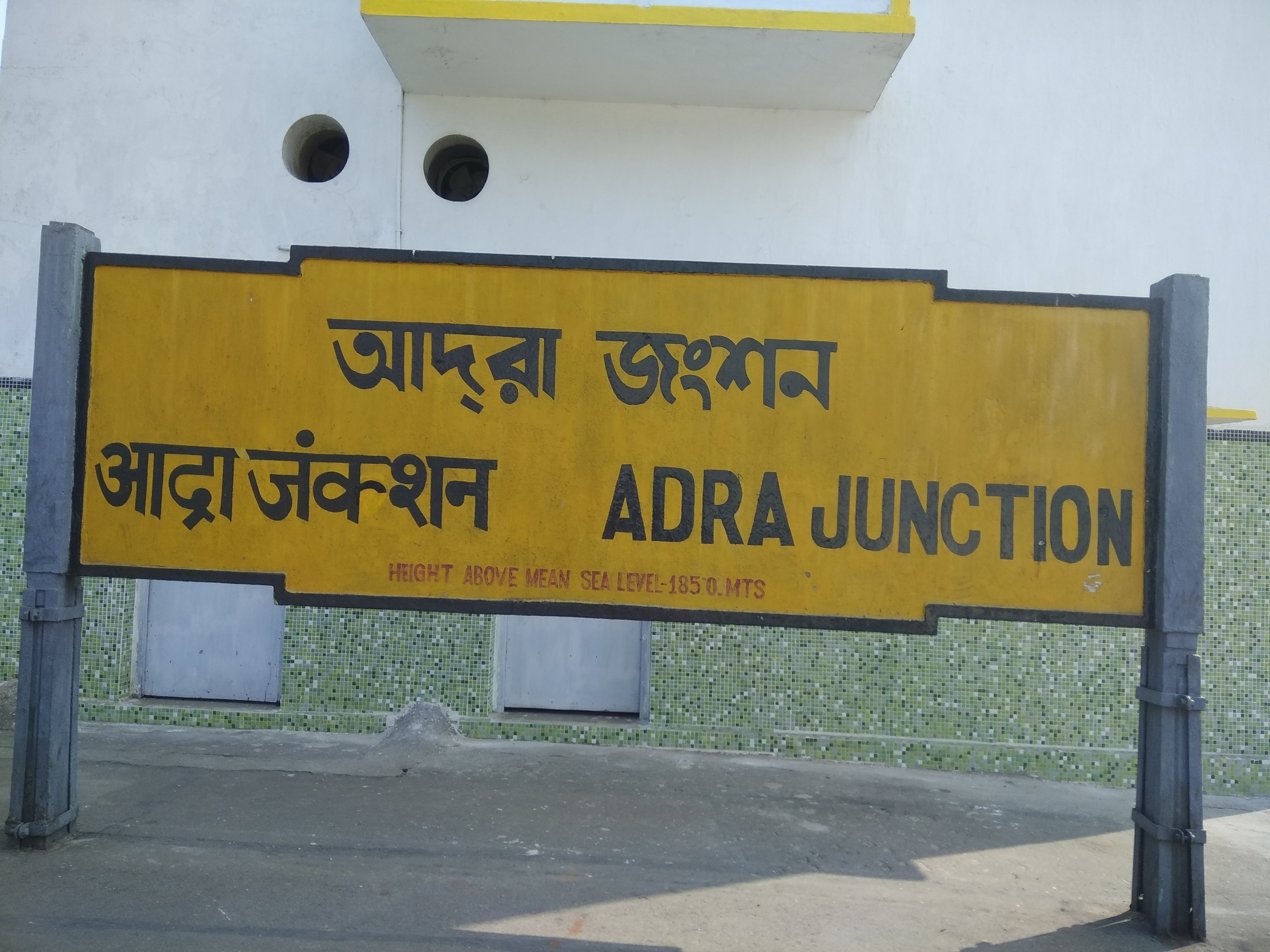

Adra Junction railway station serves Adra town, and also serves the industrial towns of Raghunathpur and Kashipur in Purulia district in the Indian state of West Bengal. It is a gateway to the famous tourist spots of Purulia district. It also servers as the divisional headquarters of the Adra Division of the South Eastern Railway zone of Indian Railways. Adra (ADRA) station is categorized as NSG 4 on the basis of yearly window sale. The station has also been declared as 'Model' as well as 'Adarsh' station. The station serves the Divisional Head Quarters.

It is a major junction station, with railway tracks from four different directions meeting at the station. It is the busiest station in the Adra division. Long distance trains such as Bhubaneswar Rajdhani Express, Bhubaneswar–New Delhi Duronto Express, Nandan Kanan Express, Ernakulam–Patna Superfast Express, and the Samarsata Express stop at Adra.

== Trains ==
- New Delhi Bhubaneswar Rajdhani Express
- Bhubaneswar–New Delhi Duronto Express
- Yesvantpur–Kamakhya AC Superfast Express
- MGR Chennai Central–New Jalpaiguri Superfast Express
- Purulia–Villupuram Superfast Express
- Mumbai Lokmanya Tilak-Howrah
- Puri–Jaynagar Express
- Puri–Kamakhya Express
- Puri-Anand Vihar Nandan Kanan Express
- Howrah–Purulia Express
- Digha–Malda Town Express
- Haldia–Asansol Express
- Digha–Asansol Express
- Howrah–Ranchi Intercity Express
- Santragachi-Parulia Rupasi Bangla Express
- Ernakulam-Patna Express
- Baidyanathdham Express
- Kolkata Shalimar- Bhojudih Aranyak Express
- Swarnarekha Express

== History ==
The Howrah–Allahabad–Mumbai line, a joint effort of Great Indian Peninsula Railway and East Indian Railway Company came up in 1870. The Bengal Nagpur Railway was formed in 1887 for the purpose of upgrading the Nagpur Chhattisgarh Railway and then extending it via Bilaspur to Asansol, in order to develop a shorter Howrah–Mumbai route than the one via Allahabad. The Bengal Nagpur Railway main line from Nagpur to Asansol, on the Howrah–Delhi main line, was opened for goods traffic on 1 February 1891. However, it was only after Kharagpur was linked from the west and the south that it was connected to Howrah in 1900.

BNR lines were extended to Gomoh, on EIR's main line, in 1907. The Mohuda–Chandrapura branch line was opened in 1913.

== Electrification ==
The Asansol–Purulia section was electrified in 1961–62. The first MEMU train services in SER were started in between Adra and Asansol. Later these services started between Adra–Purulia, Adra–Tatanagar and Adra–Medinipur.

== Gallery ==
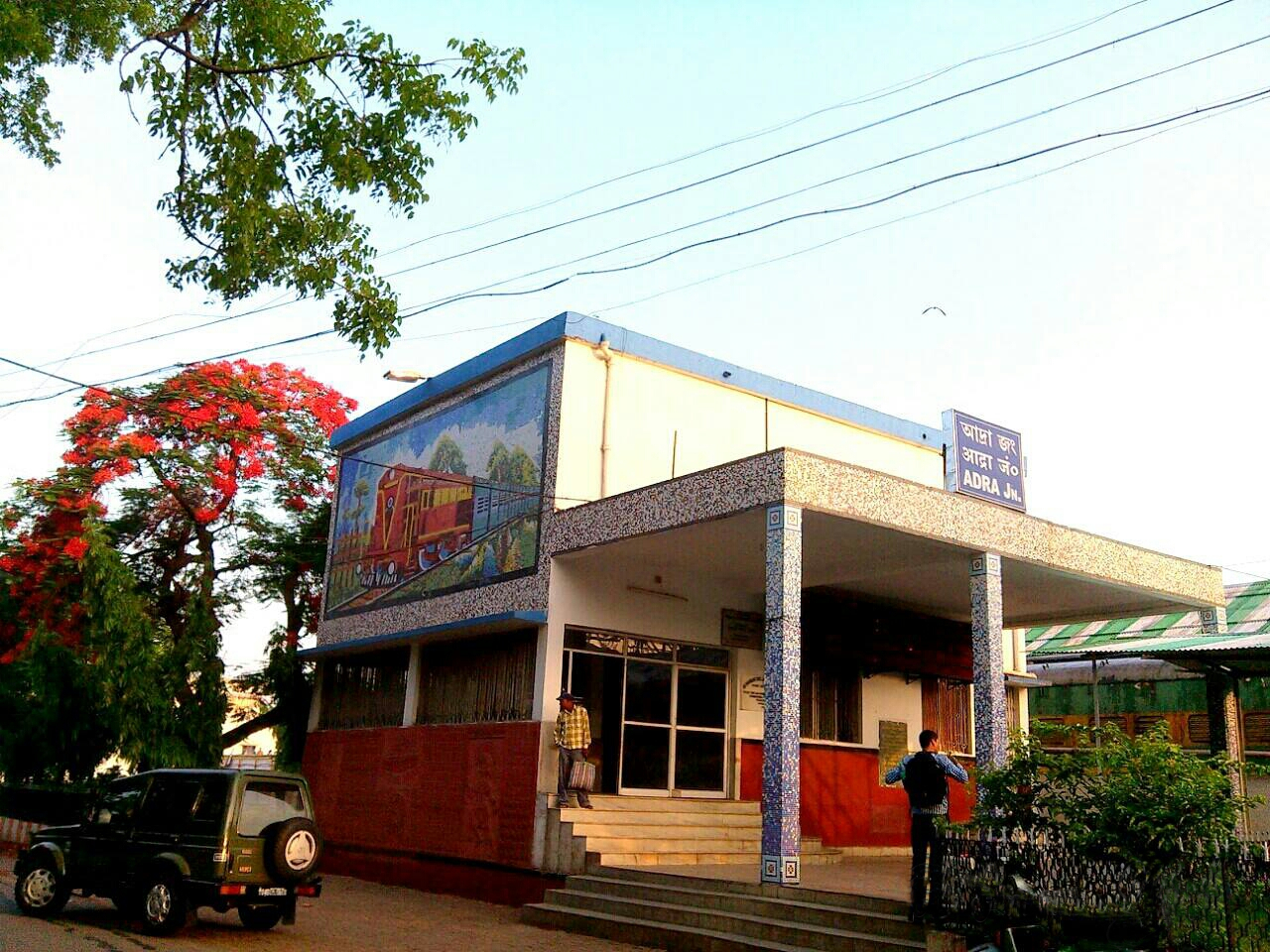
Adra Junction

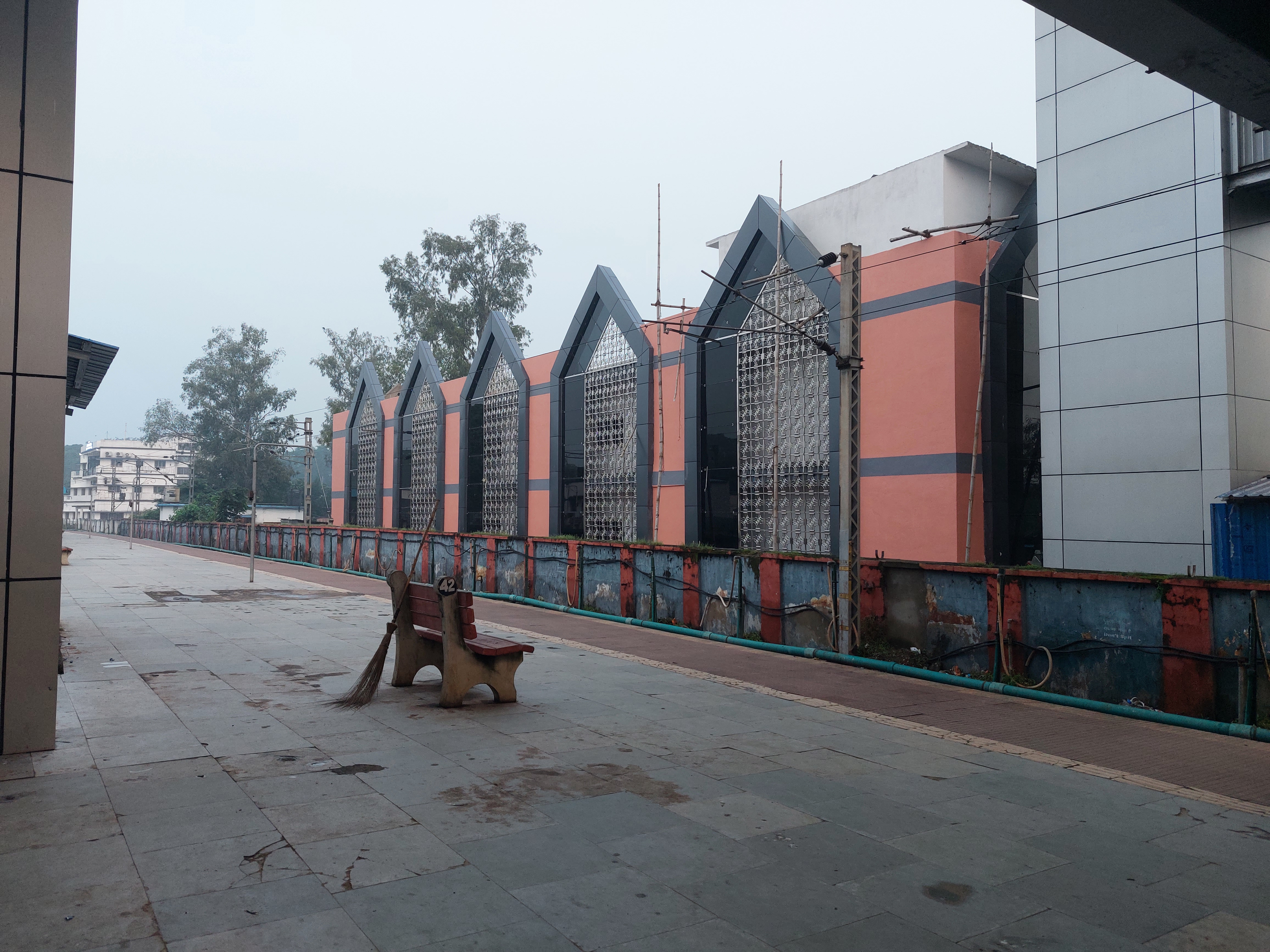
Adra Jn new station building

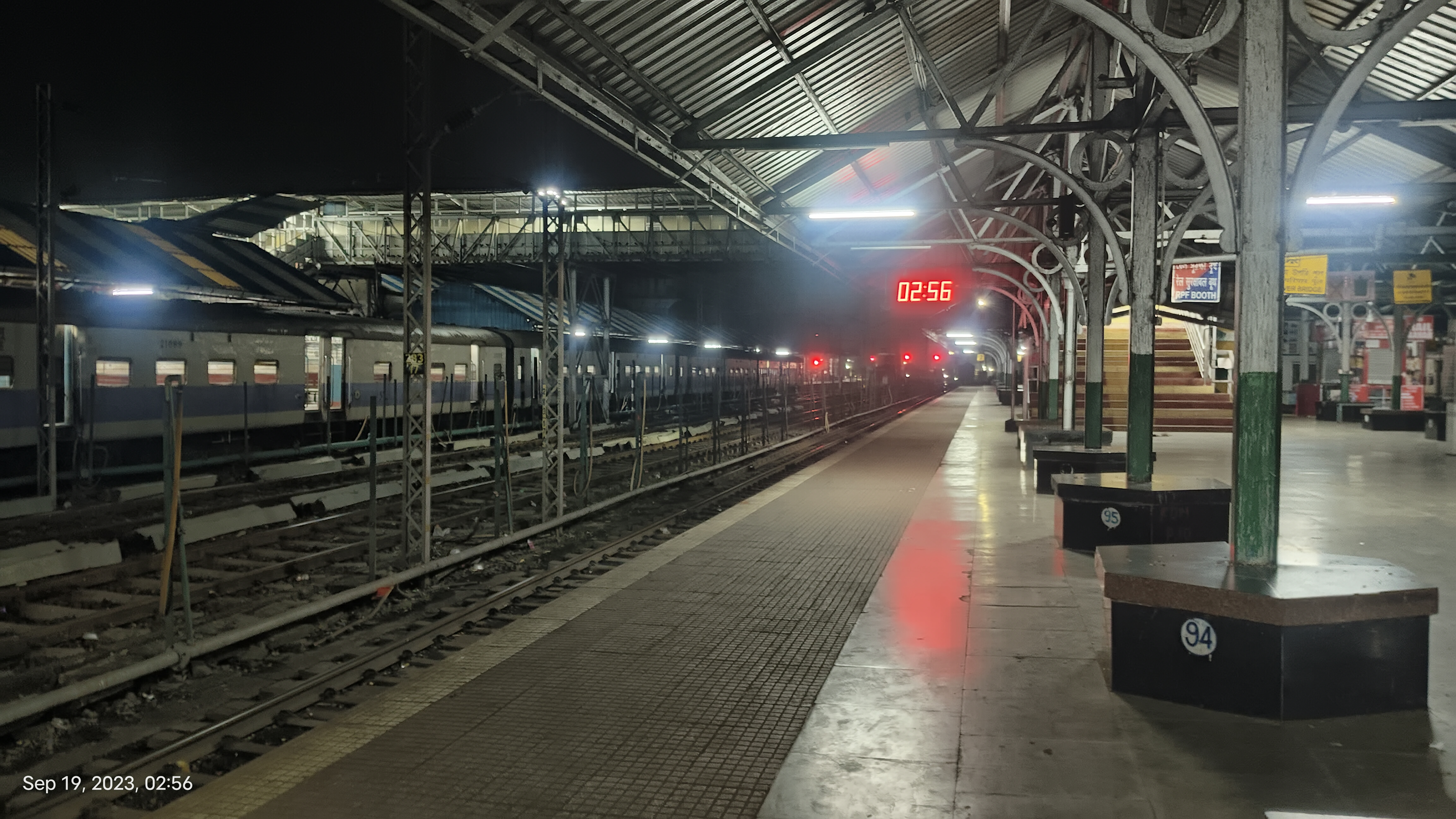
Adra Jn at night

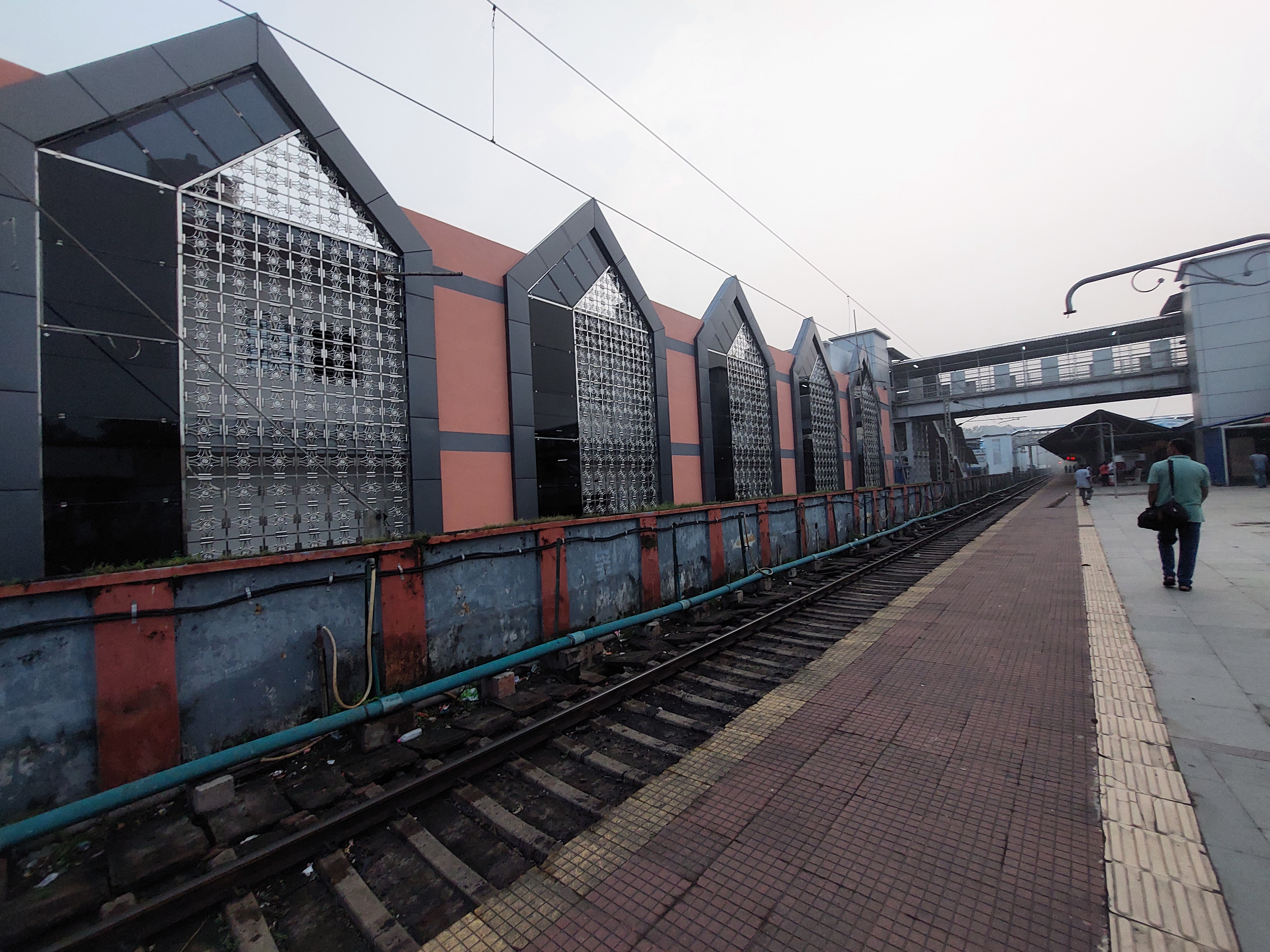
Adra Jn

Preceding station	Indian Railways	Following station
Joychandi Pahar towards ?	South Eastern Railway zone Asansol–Tatanagar–Kharagpur line	Garhdhrubeshwar towards ?
Terminus	South Eastern Railway zone Adra–Gomoh line	Sanka towards ?
Terminus	South Eastern Railway zone Adra–Bankura–Kharagpur line	Metyal Sahar towards ?
