= Adra railway division =

Railway division of India

Adra Railway Division
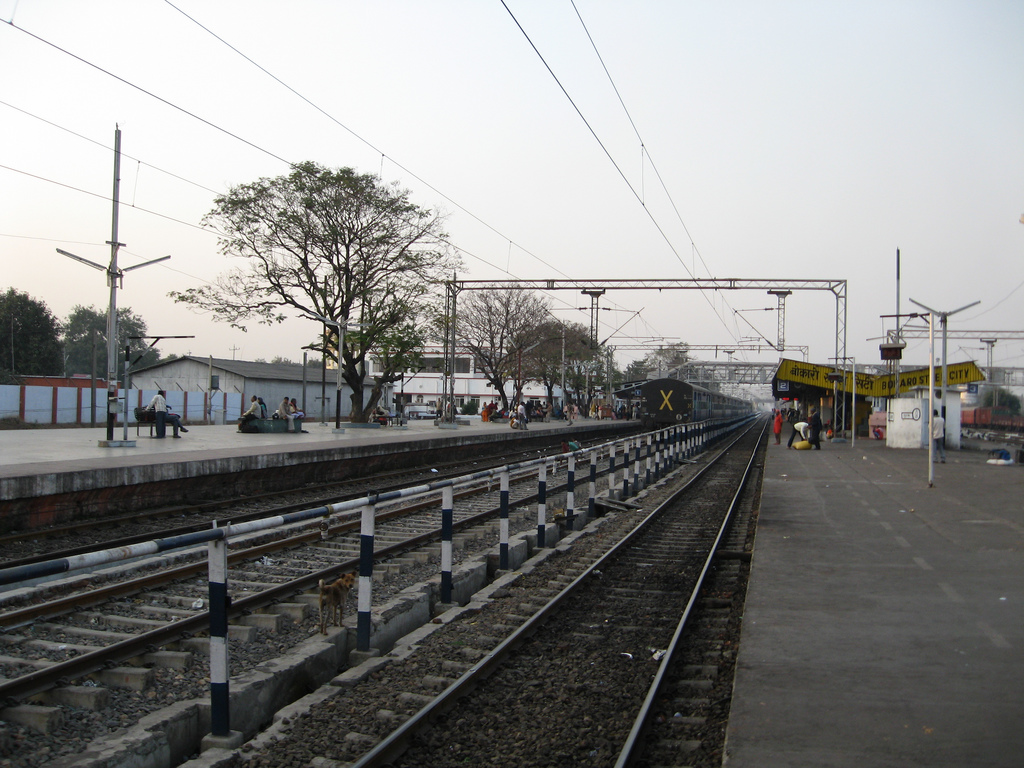
- Bokaro Steel City railway station

Overview
- Owner: South Eastern Railway zone
- Locale: Adra, West Bengal and Jharkhand, India

Service
- Type: Railway division
- System: Indian Railways

History
- Opened: 14 April 1961

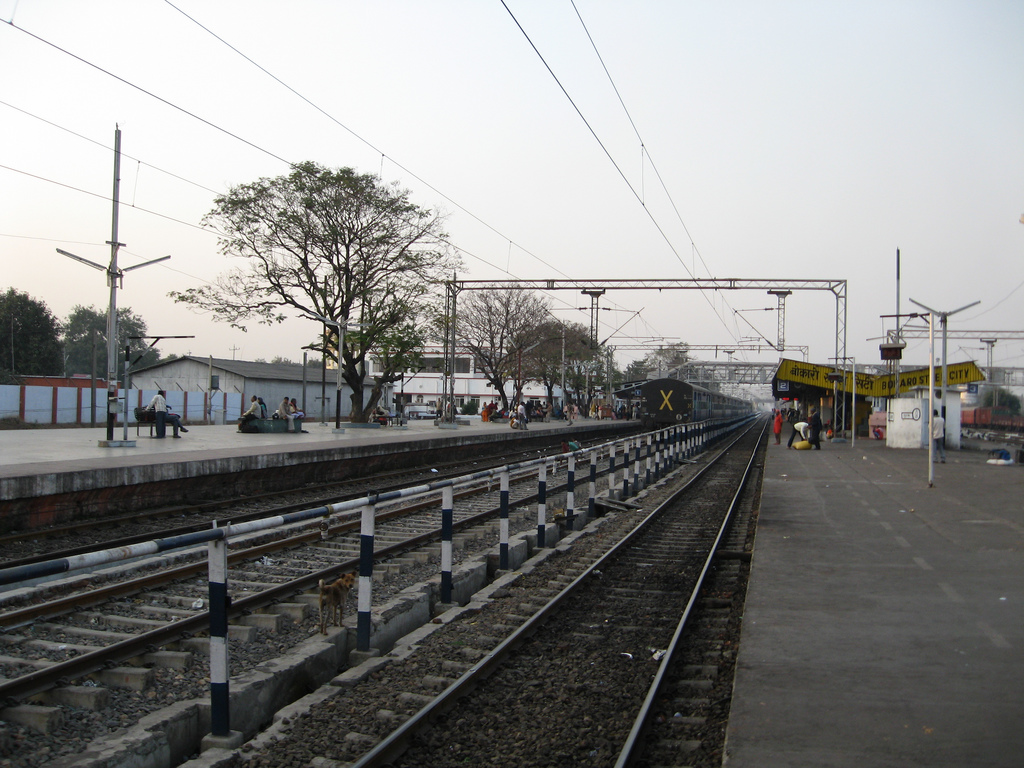
Bokaro Steel City station in 2008

Adra railway division is one of the four railway divisions under the jurisdiction of South Eastern Railway zone of the Indian Railways. This railway division was formed on 14 April 1961 and its headquarter is located at Adra town in Purulia district of West Bengal. The Divisional Railway Managers building was established in the year of 1913 which has completed its 100 years in 2013. It was earlier the headquarter of Adra district in BNR.

Kharagpur railway division, Chakradharpur railway division and Ranchi railway division are the other three railway divisions under SER Zone headquartered at Garden Reach, Kolkata.

== List of railway lines under Adra division ==
The Adra division extends from near Medinipur, WB to Bokaro in Jharkhand. The railway lines under this division include:

1. From Jangalmahal Bhadutala to Adra in West Bengal.
2. From Adra in West Bengal to Bhojudih in Jharkhand.
3. From Bhojudih to Mahuda in Jharkhand (via Talgaria and via Bhaga).
4. From Talgaria to Bokaro Steel City, Tupkadih in Jharkhand.
5. From Bokaro Steel City in Jharkhand to Kotshila in West Bengal.
6. From Purulia to Kotshila in West Bengal.
7. From Chandil in Jharkhand to Anara in Burnpur in West Bengal.
8. From Anara to Rukni in West Bengal.
9. From Bankura to Masagram in West Bengal.
10. From Mahuda to Khario in Jharkhand.
11. From Ramkanali to Chaurashi in West Bengal.
12. From Damodar to Radhanagar in West Bengal.
13. From Damodar to Mohisila in West Bengal.
14. From Bishnupur to Joyrambati in West Bengal.

== List of railway stations and towns ==
The list includes the stations under the Adra railway division and their station category.

Category of station	No. of stations	Names of stations
A-1 Category	0	-
A Category	1	Bokaro Steel City
B Category	4	Adra Junction, Purulia Junction, Bankura Junction, Bishnupur
C Category (Suburban station)	-	-
D Category	9	Barabhum, Bhaga, Burnpur, Chandrakona Road, Garbeta, Anara, Chandil Junction, Joychandi Pahar, Salboni
E Category	-	-
F Category; Halt Station	-	-
Total	-	-
