= Kharagpur–Bankura–Adra line =

Railway route in India

Kharagpur–Bankura–Adra line

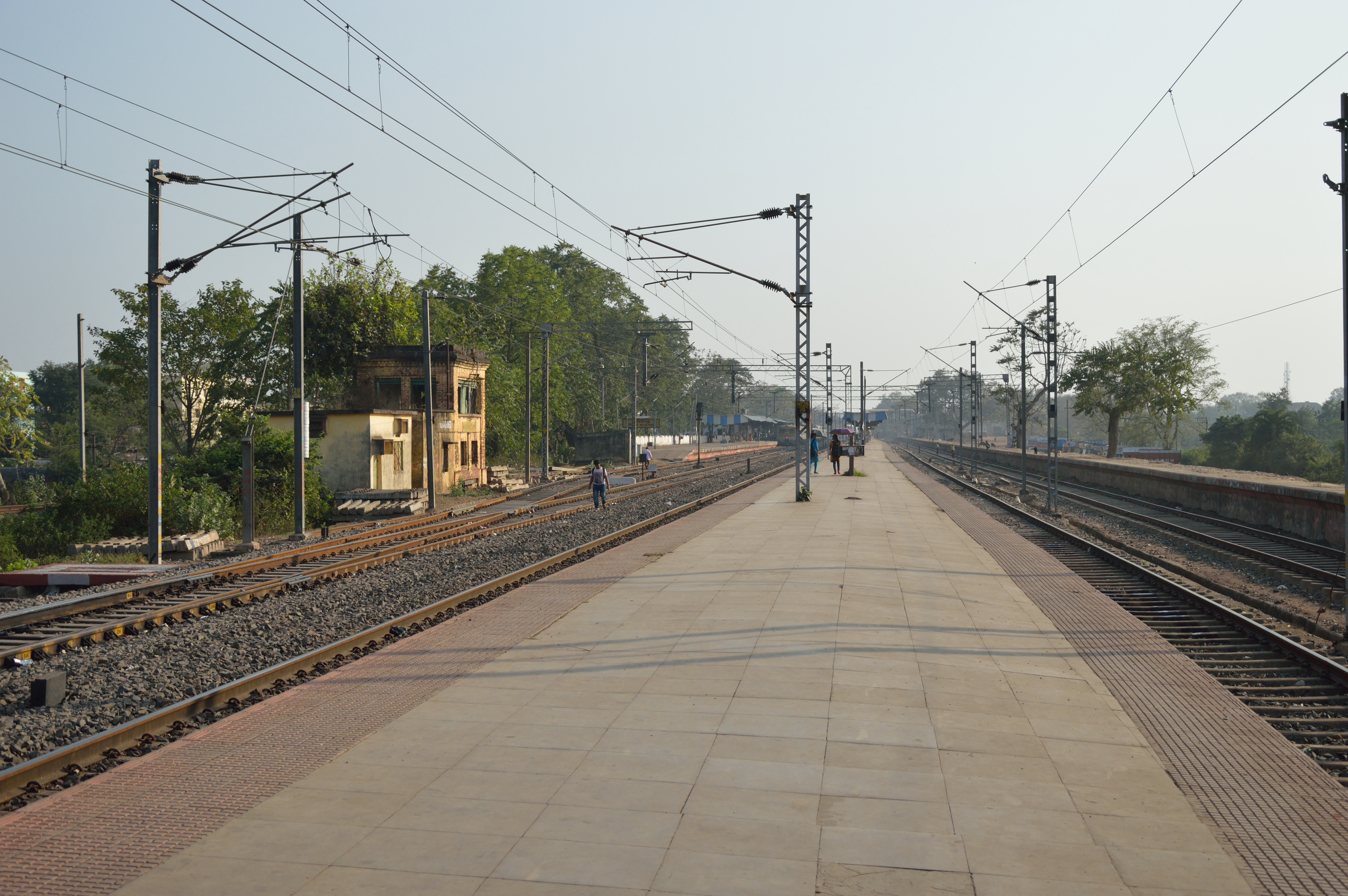
- Midnapore is an important railway station on Kharagpur–Bankura–Adra line

Overview
- Status: Operational
- Owner: Indian Railways
- Locale: West Bengal
- Termini: Kharagpur; Adra

Service
- System: Electrified
- Operator(s): South Eastern Railway

History
- Opened: 1901

Technical
- Line length: 168 km (104 mi)
- Track gauge: 5 ft 6 in (1,676 mm) broad gauge
- Electrification: Yes
- Operating speed: up to 110 km/h (68 mph)

The Kharagpur–Bankura–Adra line is part of Mednipur, Bankura, Purulia district. It links Kharagpur to Adra and Bankura in Eastern India, and also serves as a major freight line for transporting iron ore, coal and steel products to Haldia Port.

== History ==
The Kharagpur–Midnapur branch line was opened in 1901. The Midnapore–Jharia extension of the Bengal Nagpur Railway, passing through Bankura District, was opened around 1903–04. The Kharagpur–Gomoh section of BNR was opened up to Bhojudih in February 1903.

== Electrification ==
The Adra–Bheduasol sector was electrified in 1997–98, and the Bheduasol–Salboni sector in 1998–99.
