= Vinod Gupta School of Management =

Public Business School in West Bengal, India

Vinod Gupta School of Management, IIT Kharagpur
- Type: Public Business School
- Established: 1993
- Parent institution: IIT Kharagpur
- Dean: Sangeeta Sahney
- Faculty: 28 (2022)
- Students: 392 (2022)
- Postgraduates: 319 (2022)
- Doctoral students: 73 (2022)
- Location: Kharagpur, West Bengal, India; 22°19′08″N 87°18′49″E
- Website: som.iitkgp.ac.in

Vinod Gupta School of Management, IIT Kharagpur is a public graduate business school located in Kharagpur, West Bengal. An academic unit of Indian Institute of Technology Kharagpur, it is the first business school to be established in an Indian Institute of Technology (IIT).

The institute primarily offers a two-year full-time residential Master of Business Administration (MBA) programme, a three-year post-graduate MBA degree (EMBA) course for working executives and an advanced programme in management leading to the award of a Ph.D. degree.

== History ==
Vinod Gupta School of Management (VGSoM), IIT Kharagpur, was set up as the first school of management within the IIT system in 1993 at a time when India had just opened its doors to economic liberalization. The school was established with an aim to develop managers with a strong technological background who could lead tomorrow's corporate behemoths to the pinnacle of success. The concept was to start a business school along the lines of Sloan School of Management, Massachusetts Institute of Technology (MIT), US, i.e., a business school within a renowned technical institute. The School of Management was founded by a distinguished alumnus and a life-time fellow of the institute, Vinod Gupta (B.Tech. 1967), the former CEO and chairman of InfoGROUP (previously known as InfoUSA), whose endowment of US$ 2 million was matched by support from the Government of India.

== Academics ==
Vinod Gupta School of Management (VGSoM) offers the following major academic programs:

- MBA Master in Business Administration (MBA): Two-year full-time flagship residential program
- Executive MBA (EMBA): 3 year MBA program for working executives
- Doctoral degree: Ph.D. programme in management

In addition to the above, VGSoM offers other programmes like:

- Post Graduate Diploma in Business Analytics (PGDBA): Two years, full-time Business Analytics programme, jointly offered by IIM Calcutta, IIT Kharagpur and ISI
- Management Development Programmes (MDPs)
- Research and Consultancy programmes

The School is backed by the interdisciplinary engineering, science and mathematics platforms of IIT Kharagpur.
Being part of IIT system, in addition to core management subjects, students of VGSoM undertake courses in other departments, centres and schools at IIT Kharagpur on emerging topics like Artificial Intelligence and Machine Learning, Internet of Things, Cyber Security and Intellectual Property Rights.

== Rankings ==
Institute rankings

Business/Management – India
- NIRF (2023): 14

Vinod Gupta School of Management ranked 14th amongst management schools in India by the National Institutional Ranking Framework (NIRF) in 2023. The college ranked 6th in India QS World University Ranking for Business and Management Studies in 2023.

== Facilities and infrastructure ==
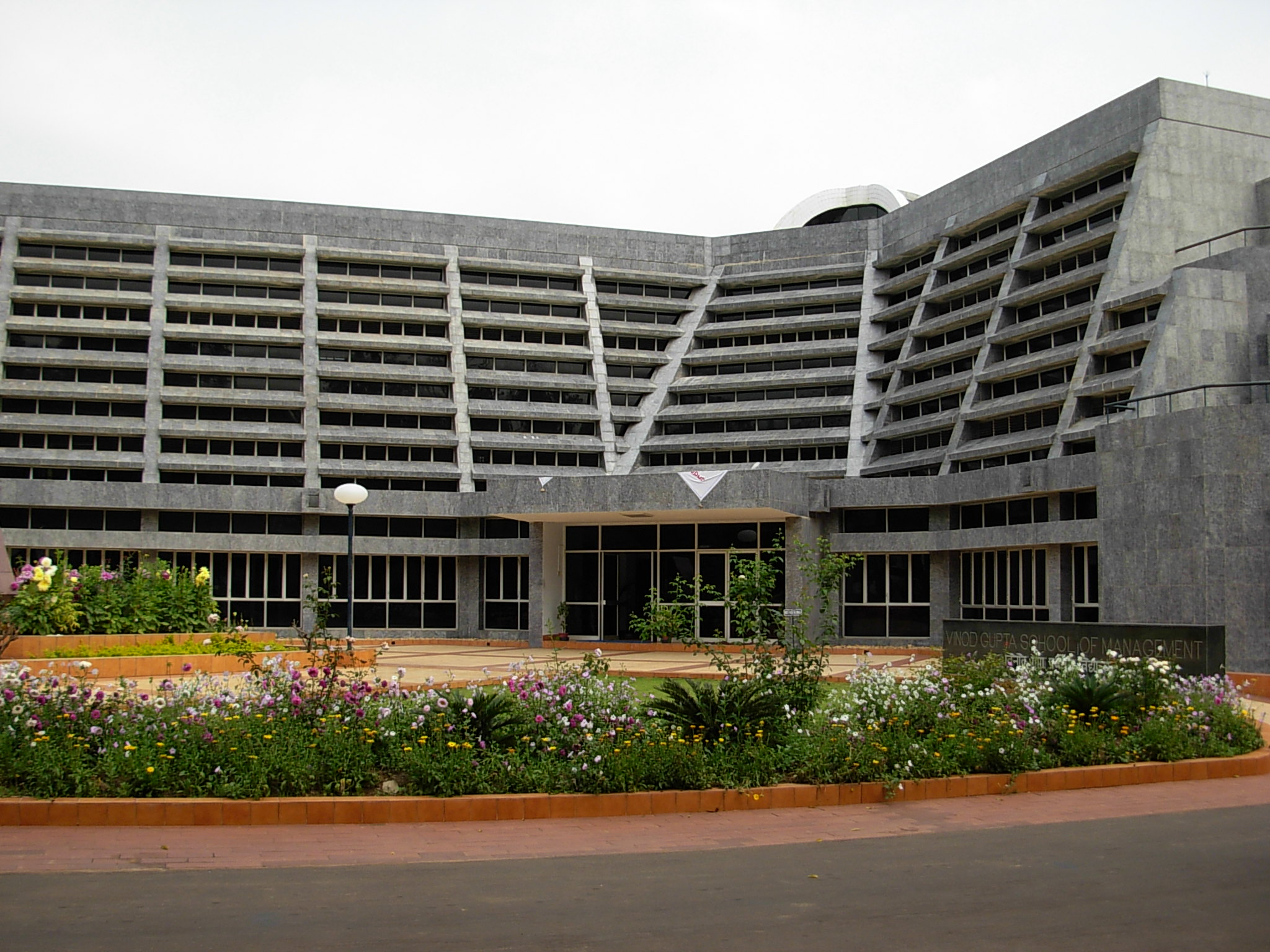
Vinod Gupta School of Management

=== Library ===
Students have access to the school's library and the institute's Central Library, which is one of the largest libraries in Asia. These two, between them, offer a collection of about 365,000 books, 1,500 journals, 1,700 CDs and videos, 44 national and international scholarly databases including the CMIE database. The school library also offers automatic transactions and web-based search facilities.

=== Hostels and accommodation ===
The Vinod Gupta School of Management provides on-campus residential accommodation facility to all its students. The halls are not exclusively for its students but are shared with postgraduate students from other courses. Hostels are provided for both men and women. All the hostels are provided with internet connectivity in each room (WiFi equipped and 100 Mbit/s LAN). The institute also maintains a number of guest houses on campus, namely Technology Guest House Visveswaraya Guest House and Salt Lake Guest House in Kolkata Extension Centre of IIT Kharagpur.
