= IIT Kharagpur =

Research Institute in Kharagpur, West Bengal, India

Coordinates: 22°19′10.97″N 87°18′35.87″E

Indian Institute of Technology Kharagpur
- Motto: yogaḥ karmasu kauśhalam
- Motto in English: Excellence in action is Yoga
- Type: Public research university
- Established: 18 August 1951; 75 years ago
- Affiliations: BRICS Universities League; INI; IoE
- Budget: ₹1,126.12 crore (US$120.3 million) (2024–25)
- Chairman: T. V. Narendran
- Director: Suman Chakraborty
- Academic staff: 870 (2025)
- Students: 14,764 (2025)
- Undergraduates: 8,452 (2025)
- Postgraduates: 3,577 (2025)
- Doctoral students: 2,735 (2025)
- Location: Kharagpur, West Bengal, India
- Campus: 2,200 acres (890 ha); Suburban
- Language: English
- Newspaper: The KGP Chronicle
- Colours: Blue
- Nicknames: IITians, KGPians
- Sporting affiliations: Inter IIT Sports Meet
- Mascot: Sacred Fig Tree
- Website: www.iitkgp.ac.in

The Indian Institute of Technology Kharagpur (IIT Kharagpur or IIT KGP) is a public institute of technology, research university, and autonomous institute established by the Government of India in Kharagpur, West Bengal. Founded in 1951, the institute is the first of the IITs to be established and is recognized as an Institute of National Importance. The institution was designated an Institute of Eminence by the Government of India in 2019.

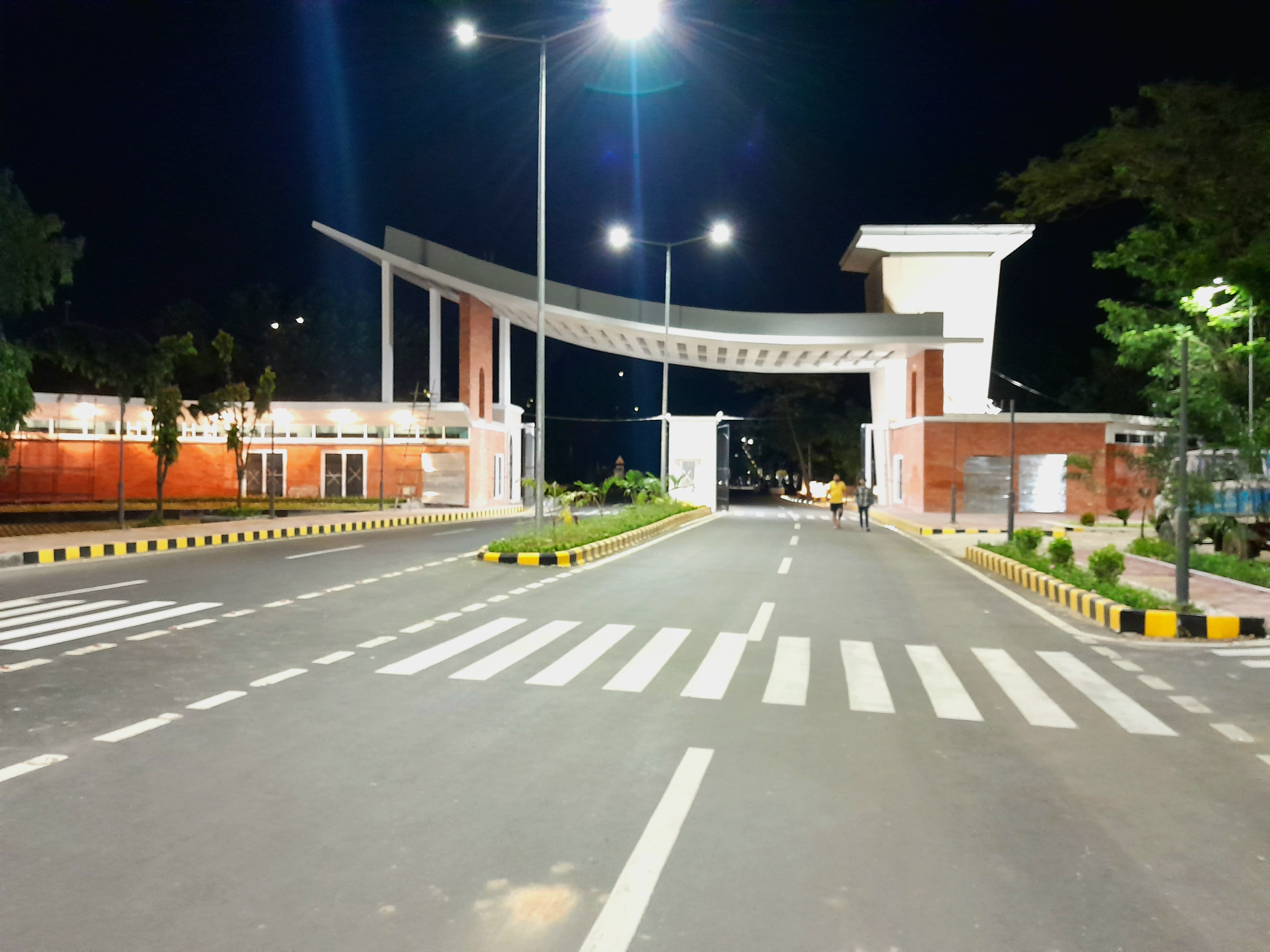
Entrance gate of IIT Kharagpur

The institute was initially established to train engineers after India attained independence in 1947. However, over the years, the institute's academic capabilities diversified with offerings in Science, management, law, Agriculture, architecture, humanities, medicine, etc. The institute has an 8.7-square-kilometre (2,100-acre) campus and has about 22,000 residents.

== History ==
=== Origins of Higher Technical Institutions in India (1946) ===
In 1946, a committee was set up by Sir Jogendra Singh, Member of the Viceroy's executive council, to consider the creation of higher technical institutions for the industrial development of India post World War II. This was followed by the creation of a 22-member committee headed by Nalini Ranjan Sarkar. In its interim report, the Sarkar Committee recommended the establishment of higher technical institutions in India, along the lines of the Massachusetts Institute of Technology and consulting from the University of Illinois at Urbana–Champaign along with affiliated secondary institutions. The report urged that work should start with the speedy establishment of major institutions in the four-quarters of the country with the ones in the east and the west to be set up immediately.

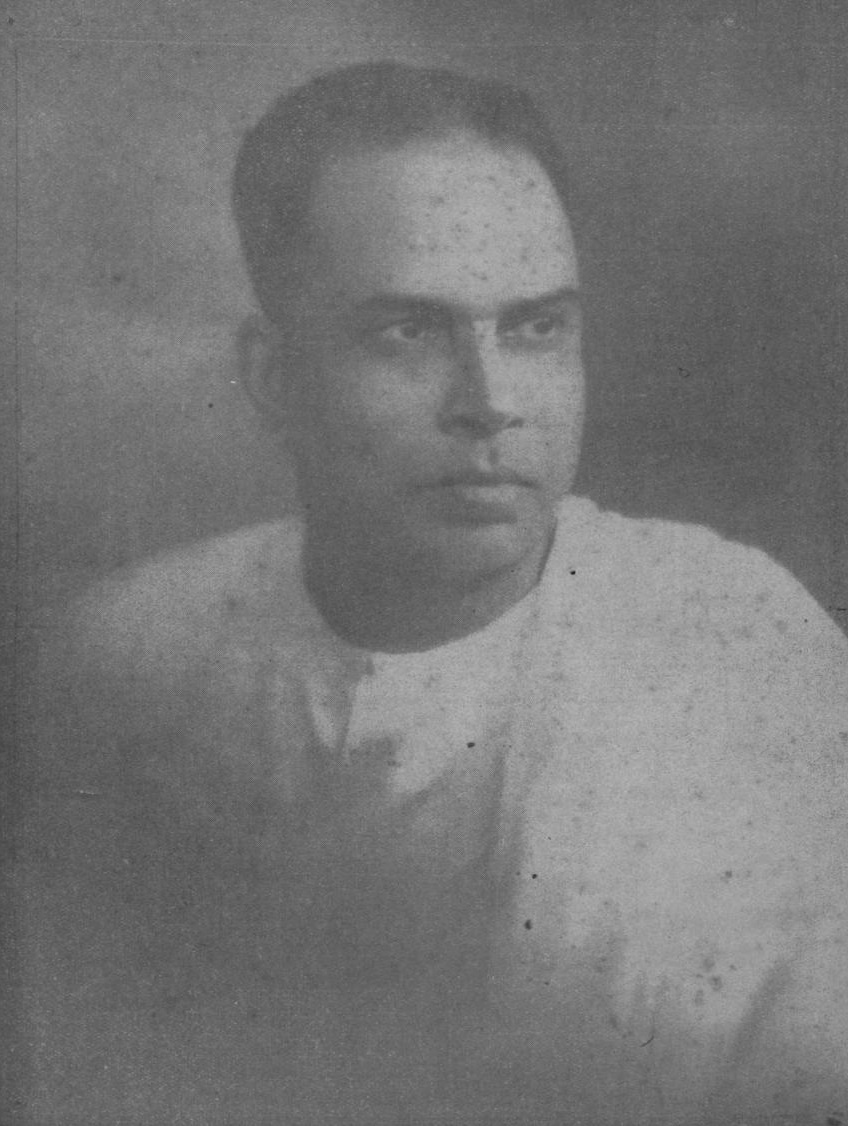
Nalini Ranjan Sarkar, who recommended the set up of IIT's, along the lines of MIT

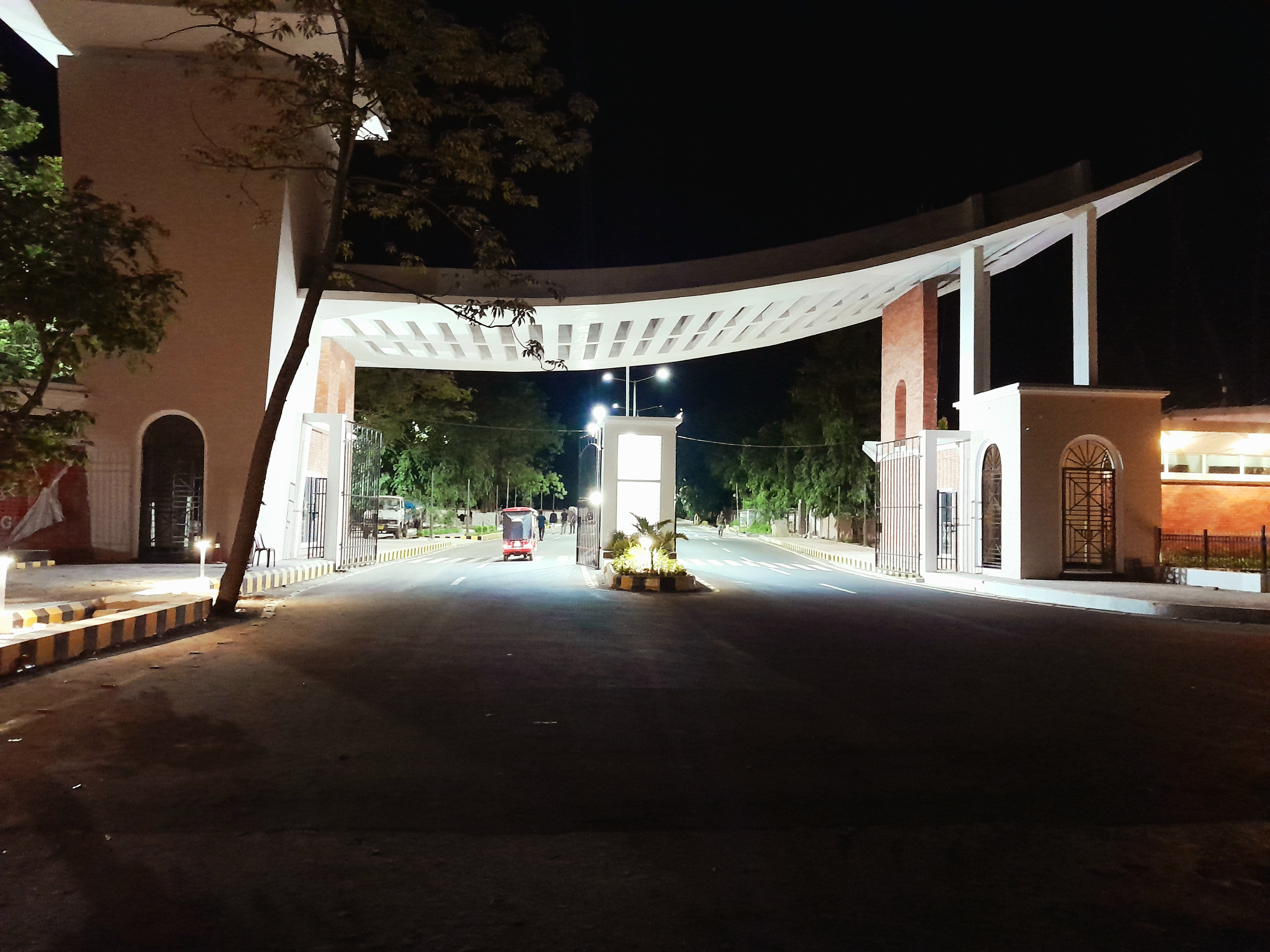
IIT Kharagpur Main Entrance

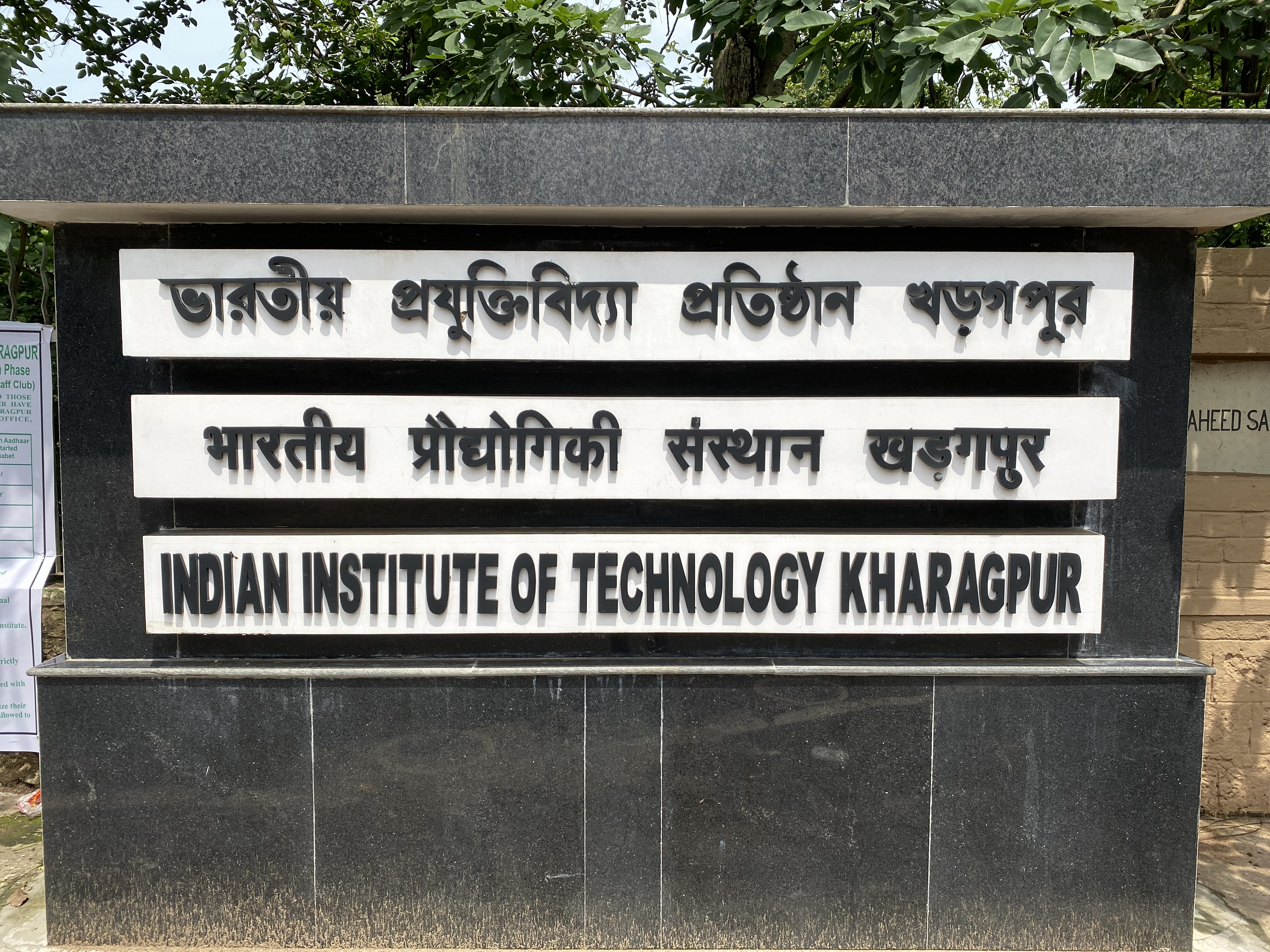
IIT Kharagpur – Main Entrance Gate (Puri Gate)

On the grounds that West Bengal had the highest concentration of industries at the time, Bidhan Chandra Roy, the Chief Minister of West Bengal, persuaded Jawaharlal Nehru (India's first prime minister) to establish the first institute in West Bengal. The first Indian Institute of Technology was thus established in May 1950 as the Eastern Higher Technical Institute. It was located in Esplanade East, Calcutta, and in September 1950 shifted to its permanent campus at Hijli, Kharagpur – 120 kilometres (75 mi) south-west of Kolkata (formerly called Calcutta). Hijli had been used as a detention camp during the period of British rule in India, where Indian independence activists were imprisoned.

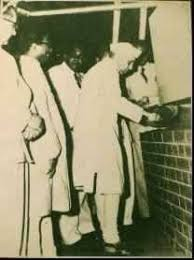
Jawaharlal Nehru laying the foundation stone in 1951

IIT Kharagpur is the 4th oldest technical institute in the state after IIEST, Shibpur (established as B.E. College in 1856), Jadavpur University (established as the Bengal Technical Institute in 1906) and Rajabazar Science College (established as Calcutta University campus for Science and Technology in 1914). When the first session started in August 1951, there were 224 students and 42 teachers in the ten departments of the institute. The classrooms, laboratories and the administrative office were housed in the historic building of the Hijli Detention Camp (now known as Shaheed Bhawan), where political revolutionaries were imprisoned during the period of British colonial rule. The office building had served as the headquarters of the Bomber Command of the U.S. 20th Air Force during World War II.

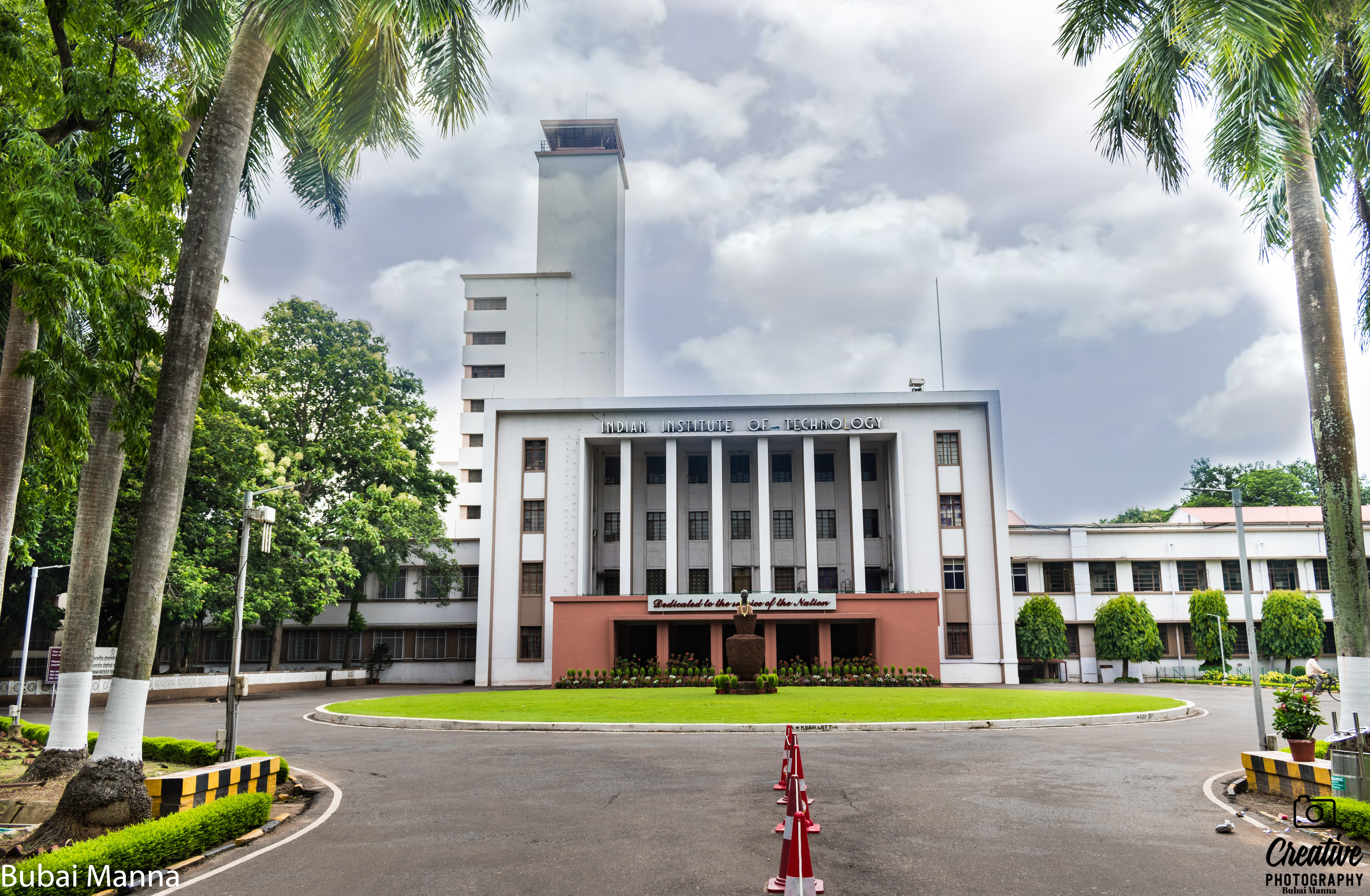
IIT Kharagpur main building

=== IIT Kharagpur: Naming, Legal Status, and Early Growth ===
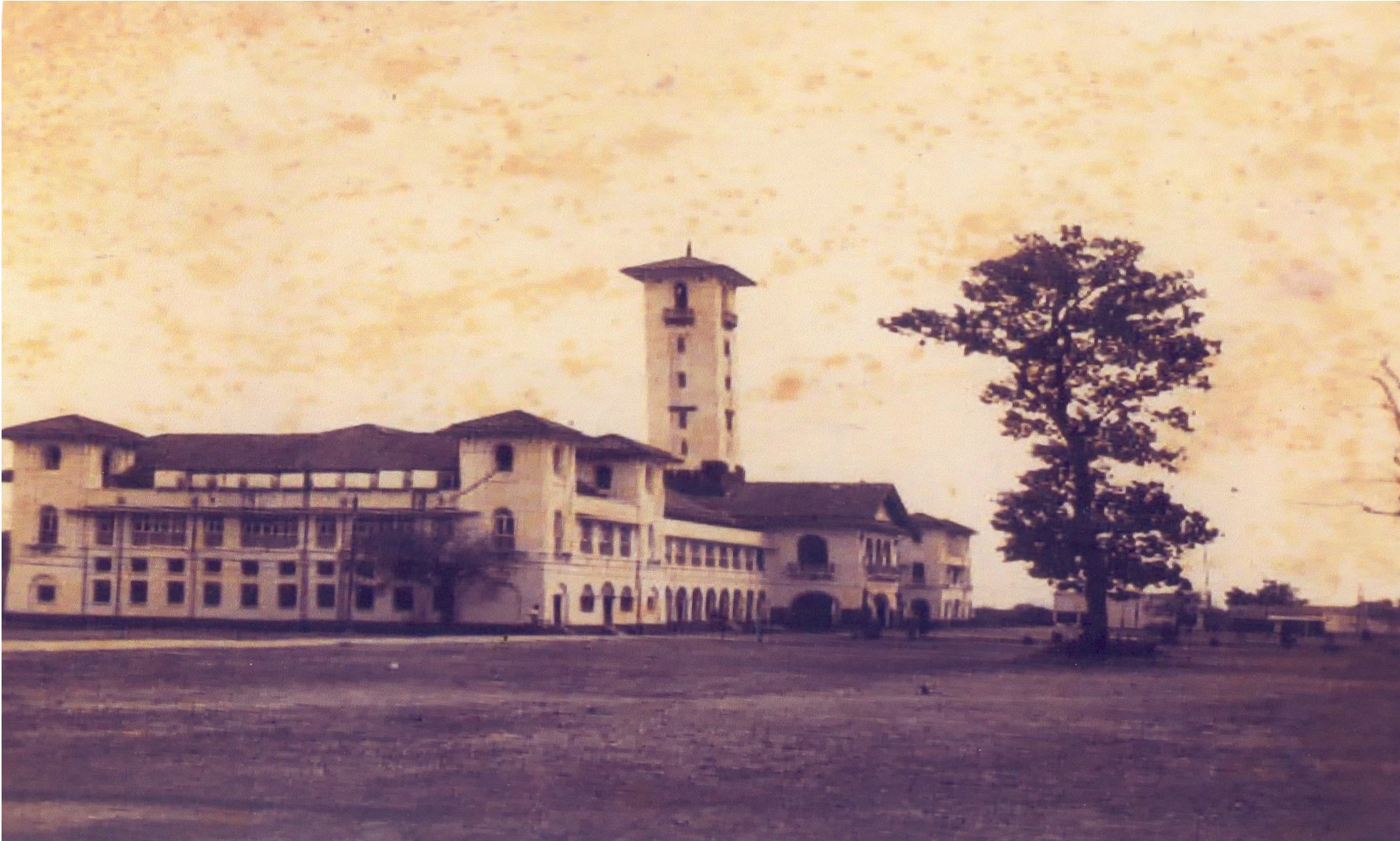
The Hijli Detention Camp (photographed in 1951) served as IIT Kharagpur's first academic building

The name "Indian Institute of Technology" was adopted before the formal inauguration of the institute on 18 August 1951 by Maulana Abul Kalam Azad. On 18 May 1956, a Bill (Bill no 36 of 1956) was introduced in Lok Sabha to declare the institution known as the Indian Institute of Technology Kharagpur to be an institution of national importance and to provide for its incorporation and matters connected therewith. The motto of the institute, योगः कर्मसु कौशलम् is taken from the Bhagavad Gita, Chapter 2, Verse 50, and it has been translated by Sri Aurobindo as "Excellence in action is Yoga". On 15 September 1956, the Indian Institute of Technology (Kharagpur) Act, 1956 of Parliament received the assent of the President. Prime Minister Nehru, in the first convocation address of IIT Kharagpur, said:

Here in the place of that Hijli Detention Camp stands the fine monument of India, representing India's urges, India's future in the making. This picture seems to me symbolical of the changes that are coming to India.

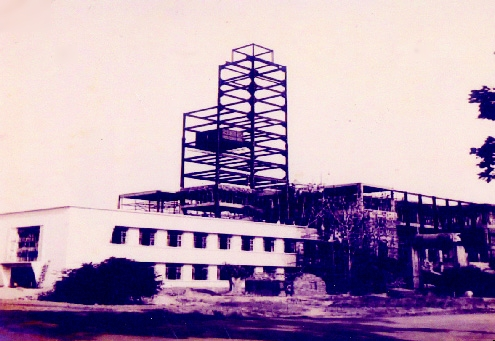
The main building of the institute during construction (1955)

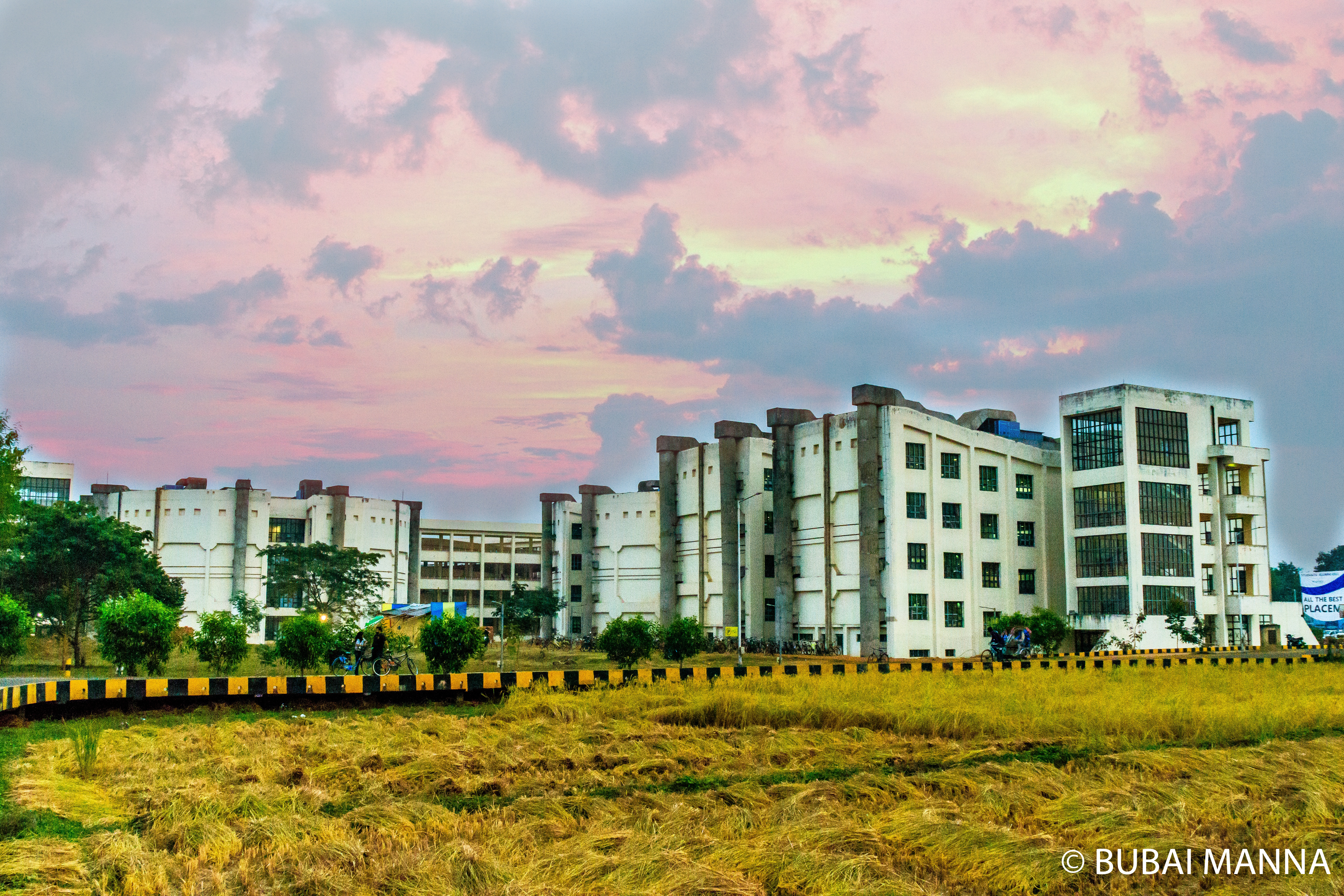
Nalanda Complex, 2018

The Srinivasa Ramanujan Complex was incorporated as another academic complex of the institute with Takshashila starting operation in 2002, Vikramshila in 2003, and Nalanda in 2012. The erstwhile Hijli Detention camp building, subsequently renamed as the Hijli Saheed Bhavan, hosts the Nehru Museum of Science & Technology and is an imposing building bearing resemblance to the Byzantine style of architecture.

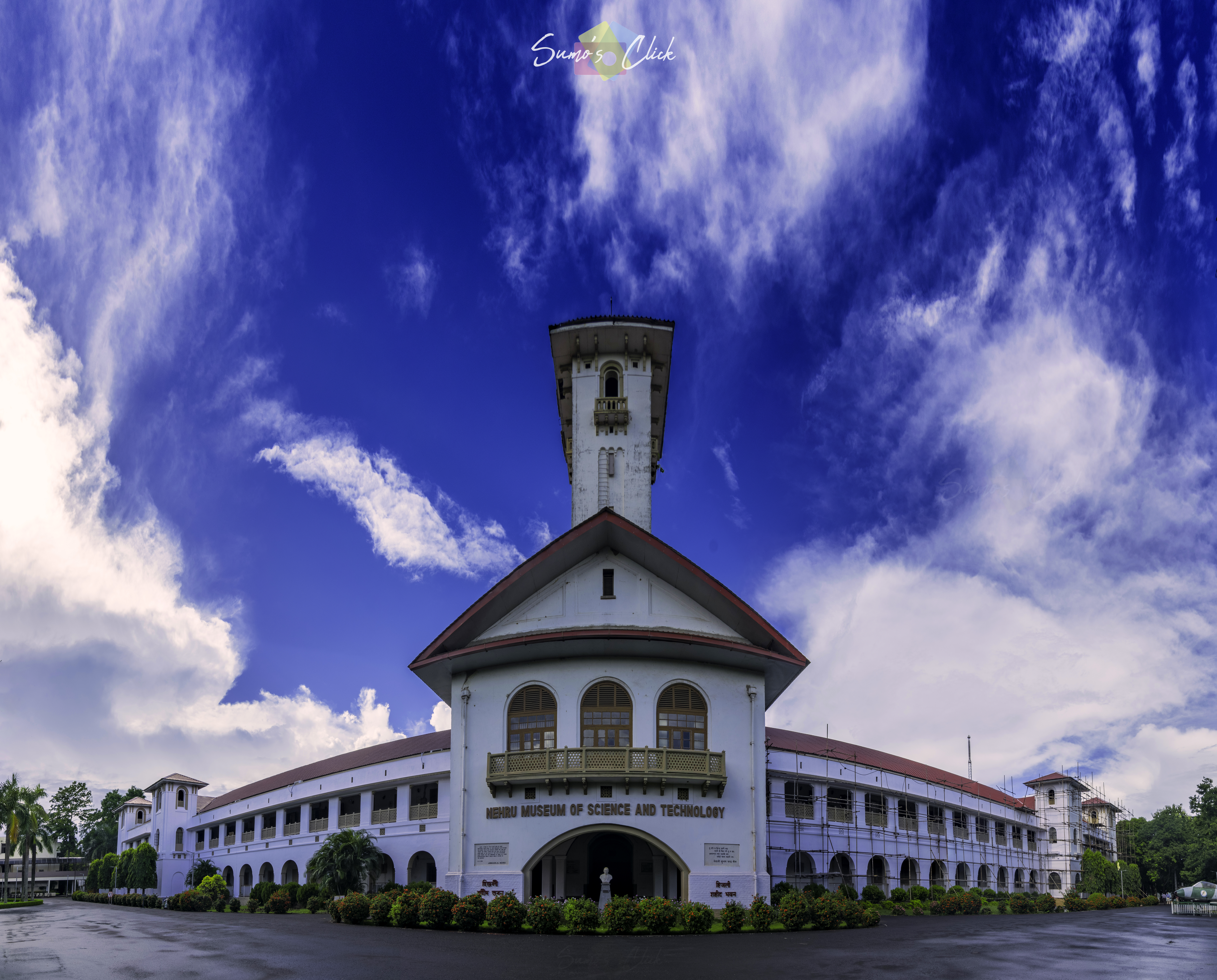
Nehru Museum

== Campus ==
IIT Kharagpur is located 120 kilometres (75 mi) west of Kolkata. The campus is located five kilometres away from Kharagpur Railway Station in West Midnapore district. The layout of the present campus and the design of the buildings were carried out by a group of engineers and architects under the guidance of Werner M. Moser, a Swiss architect. The 8.5-square-kilometre (2,100-acre) campus is residence to about 22,000 inhabitants. In 2015, IIT Kharagpur had about 605 faculty members, 1,933 employees and approximately 10,010 students living on the campus. The campus has a total of 55 kilometres (34 miles) of roadways. The Institute plans to go Green by 2020.

The 22 student hostels are located on either side of Scholars Avenue, which extends from the institute gate to the B. C. Roy Technology Hospital. The three earliest halls—Patel, Azad, and Nehru—together constitute the PAN loop or Old Campus, which is located just next to Scholar's Avenue. There are twelve hostels for undergraduate male students (MMM, LBS, RP, RK, MS, LLR, HJB, JCB, VS, Patel, Azad and Nehru) and two for undergraduate female students (SN/IG and MT). There are post-graduate hostels including four for women (RLB, Gokhle, Nivedita and SAM), two for research scholars (BCR and BRH), and a separate hostel for scholars from the armed forces. The Jnan Ghosh Stadium and the Tata Sports Complex host large-scale sports competitions. The Tagore Open Air Theatre has a capacity of 6,000 people, and is used to host cultural programs. The Science and Technology Entrepreneurs' Park (STEP) provides infrastructure facilities to alumni seeking to start their own corporations.

In addition to the main campus at Kharagpur, the institute has an extension centre at Kolkata to provide venues for continuing education programmes, distance learning courses, and guesthouse accommodation. The Kolkata extension centre at Rajarhat is used to offer some full-time undergraduate and postgraduate courses. The 4-hectare (10-acre) Rajarhat campus houses 2,500 students. The institute's plan for a similar branch campus of 0.81 square kilometres (200 acres) in Bhubaneswar was scrapped following rejection by the Union Human Resource and Development ministry.

The Ministry of Human Resource Development on 5 September 2019 awarded the "Institute of Eminence" status to IIT Kharagpur along with four public institution in India, which will enable full autonomy and special incentives.

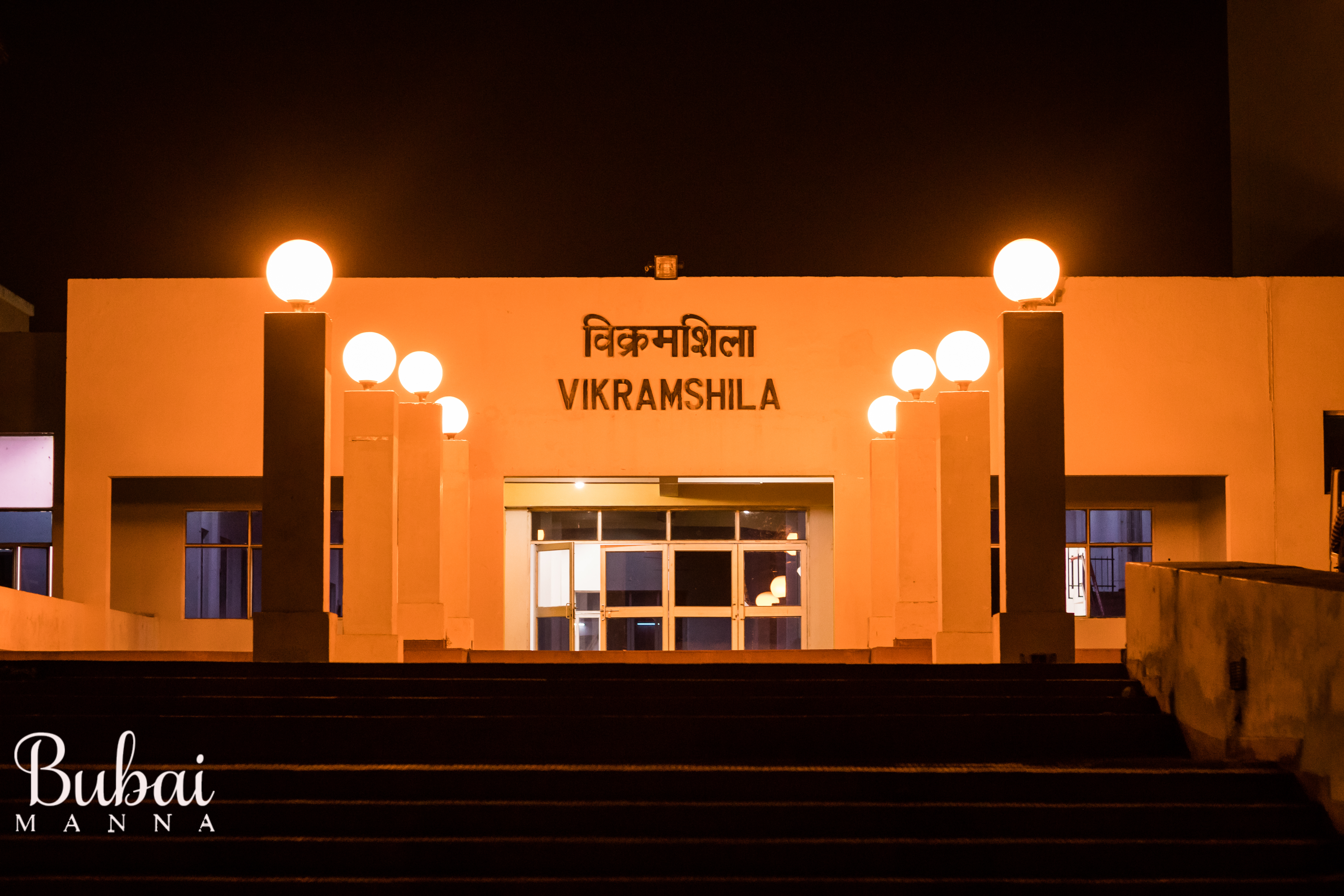
Vikramshila, 2018

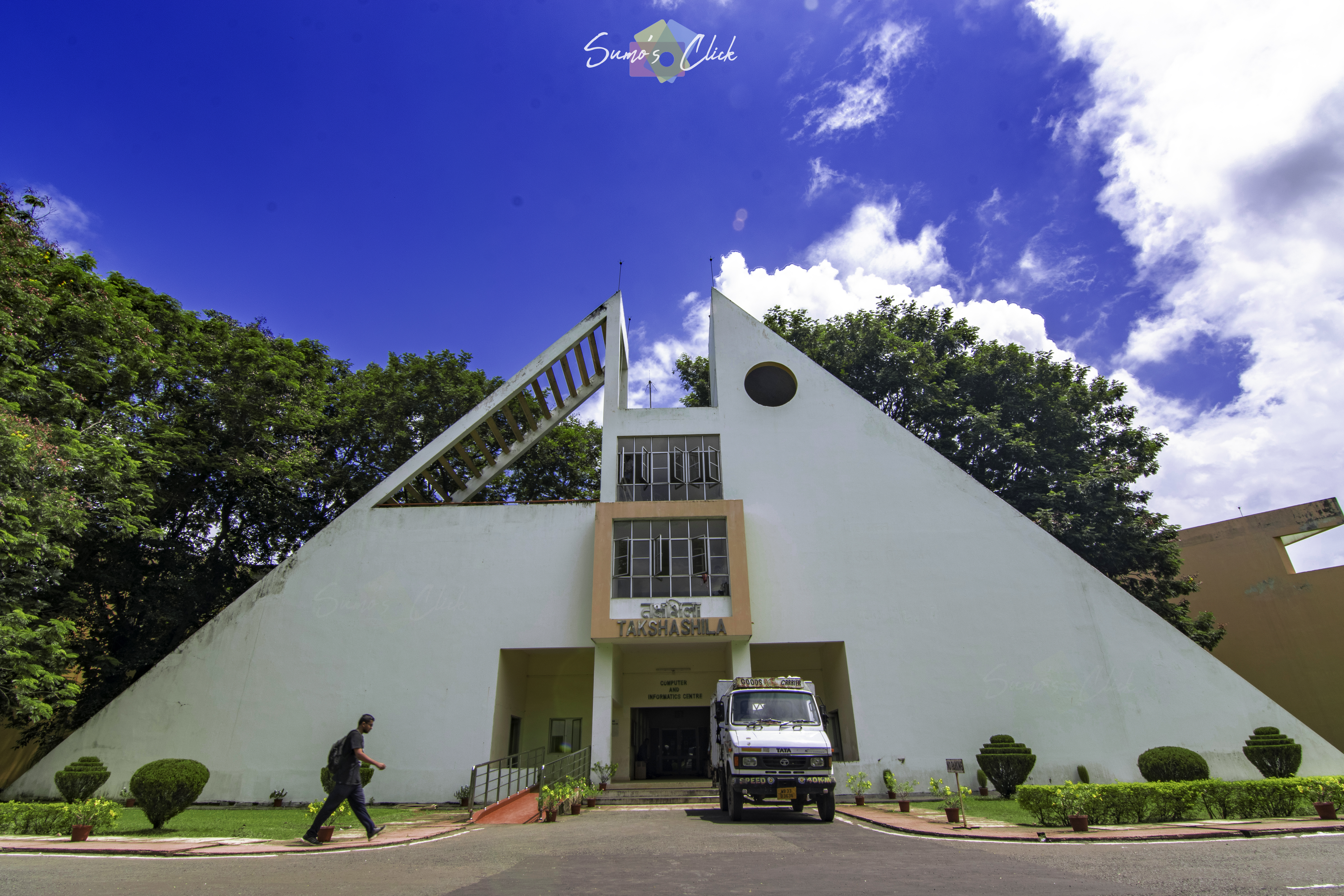
Takshashila, 2018

=== Academic buildings ===
IIT Kharagpur has 19 academic departments, eight multi-disciplinary centres/schools, and 13 schools of excellence in addition to more than 25 central research and development units. Apart from the main building in the central academic complex, the Srinivasa Ramanujan Complex also has common academic facilities. Takshashila houses the G. S. Sanyal School of Telecommunication, the School of Information Technology, the Computer and Informatics Centre, and has facilities for conducting lectures. The Vikramshila Complex consists of four lecture halls, several seminar rooms, and the 850-seat Kalidas Auditorium. The School of Medical Science and Technology is housed in the basement of the Vikramshila building.

The institute main building houses most of the administrative offices, the lecture halls, and two auditoriums on either side. The signage at the front displays the message, "Dedicated to the service of the nation." The tower of the main building has a steel tank with 10,000 imperial gallons of water capacity for emergency supply needs. The Netaji Auditorium in the main building is used for official functions and events, and doubles as a cinema theatre on weekend nights, showing films to the IIT community at subsidised rates.

IIT Kharagpur's first library was located in a small room of the institute's Old Building (Shaheed Bhawan). At the time of its opening in 1951, the library had a collection of 2,500 books. Now located in the main building of the institute, the Central Library is one of the largest of its type. Its collection includes over 350,000 books and documents, and it subscribes to more than 1,600 printed and online journals and conference proceedings.

The library has six halls and a section exclusively for SC and ST students. The library's collection consists of books, reports, conference proceedings, back volumes of periodicals, standards, theses, micro-forms, DVDs, CD-ROMs, and audio-visual material. The library's transaction service is automated and online searches are possible through an Online Public Access Catalog (OPAC). The Electronic Library section has a collection of databases, video lectures and miscellaneous other resources.

The Nehru Museum of Science and Technology has over a hundred indoor exhibits that include technical models collected from institutions across India. The park outside the museum contains 14 open-air demonstrations and outdoor exhibits, including a fighter plane and a steam engine. The museum has an archive room, showing documents relating to the history of the institute and West Midnapore district. The Rural Museum, located in the Rural Development Centre, has a collection of exhibits in local culture.

=== Civic amenities ===
The institute campus has six guest houses, a civic hospital, four nationalised banks, four schools (Hijli High School, Kendriya Vidyalaya, D.A.V Model School, and St. Agnes Branch School), a railway reservation counter and a police station. The campus has a water pumping station, electrical sub-station, telephone exchange, market, six restaurants, and a garbage disposal section for the daily needs of the residents. Construction is presently going on for another guest house and a convention centre with a 2,000 seating capacity. The institute draws its supply of water from wells near the Kosai river (located 112 kilometres away from institute) by harnessing sub-surface water. Three deep wells near the institute supplement the supply from the river. The water is supplied by a 16-inch (410 mm) pipeline to 12 tanks in the campus with a total capacity of 2,800,000 litres (615,000 imperial gallons). In 2009, students had expressed dissatisfaction with the level of amenities on campus, especially the civic hospital, forcing the director to resign.

IIT Kharagpur is located just outside the town of Kharagpur, in the village of Hijli. Its civic amenities make it nearly self-sufficient with regards to the basic needs of the residents. As Kharagpur is a small town, there is limited direct interaction between the campus community and the town. There is also little employment opportunities for families of the faculty. Unlike some IITs (such as IIT Bombay), IIT Kharagpur does not restrict the entry of outsiders into the campus. IIT Kharagpur provides much of its benefits to the local community through the Rural Development Centre (RDC) located in the campus. Established in 1975, the RDC helps the local community by developing customised technologies. The RDC also co-ordinates the National Service Scheme (NSS) programs in IIT Kharagpur, with the members of NSS taking part in weekly community service activities such as sanitation, road construction, teaching and building educational models.

In 2005, IIT Kharagpur started the construction of a boundary wall to ensure campus security, which is now complete. At present, mild restrictions apply on the entry of outsiders' vehicles. The boundary wall was opposed by the local community as it would hinder their access to amenities provided by the institute. Campus residents have also been denied direct access to the adjoining Hijli railway station as a result of this wall. The local community opposed the construction of a flyover from the railway station to the campus, stating that it would lead to a substantial loss of opportunity for the shops along the roads. However, upon completion, the Hijli road over-bridge has resulted in convenient transportation to the campus. The construction of the 1,052.69 metres (3,453.7 ft) long flyover was approved by the Indian Railways and West Bengal state government, and was constructed for an estimated cost of ₹237 million (US$2.5 million).

=== Halls of residence ===
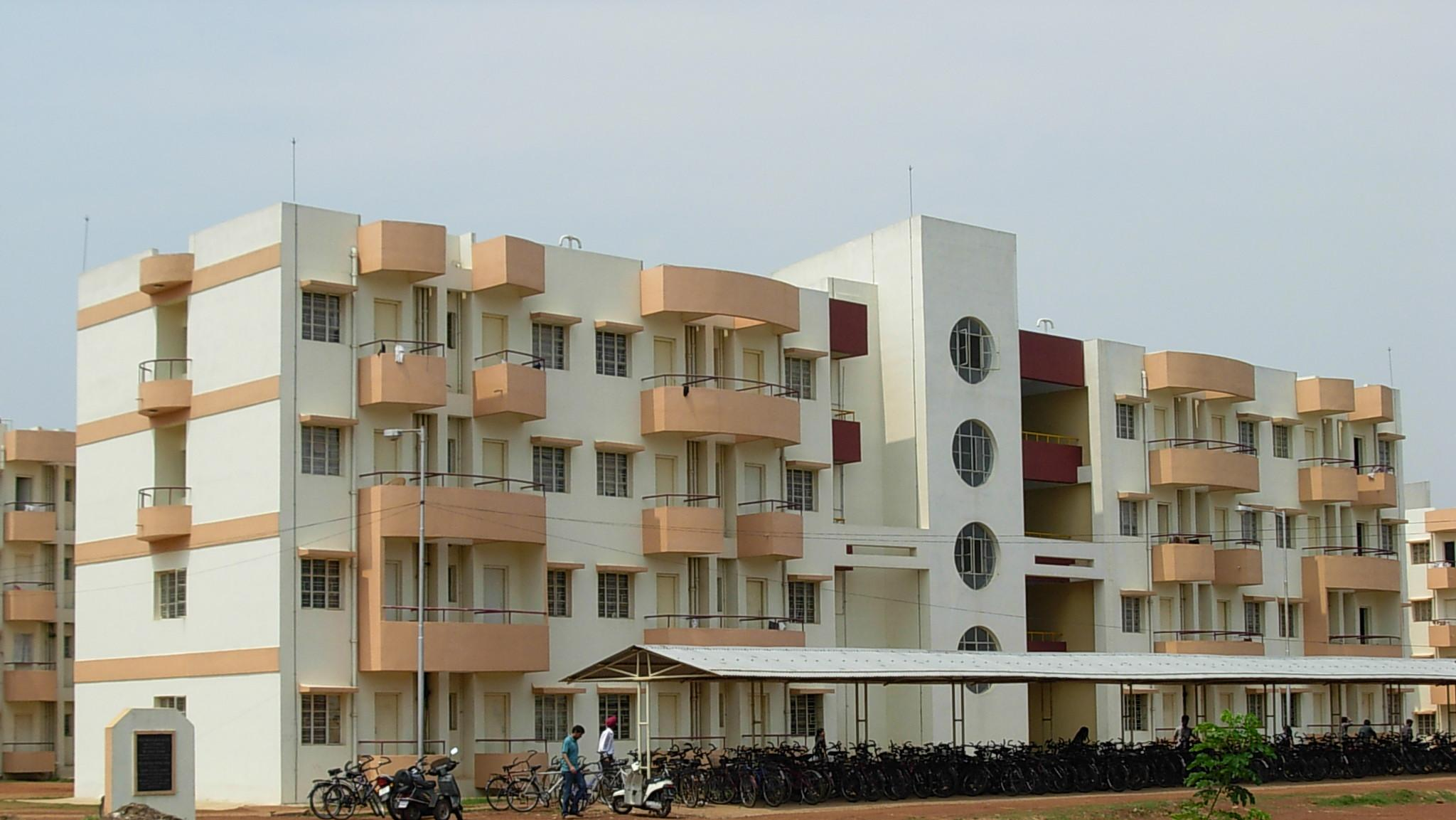
Madan Mohan Malviya Hall accommodates both undergraduates and post-graduates

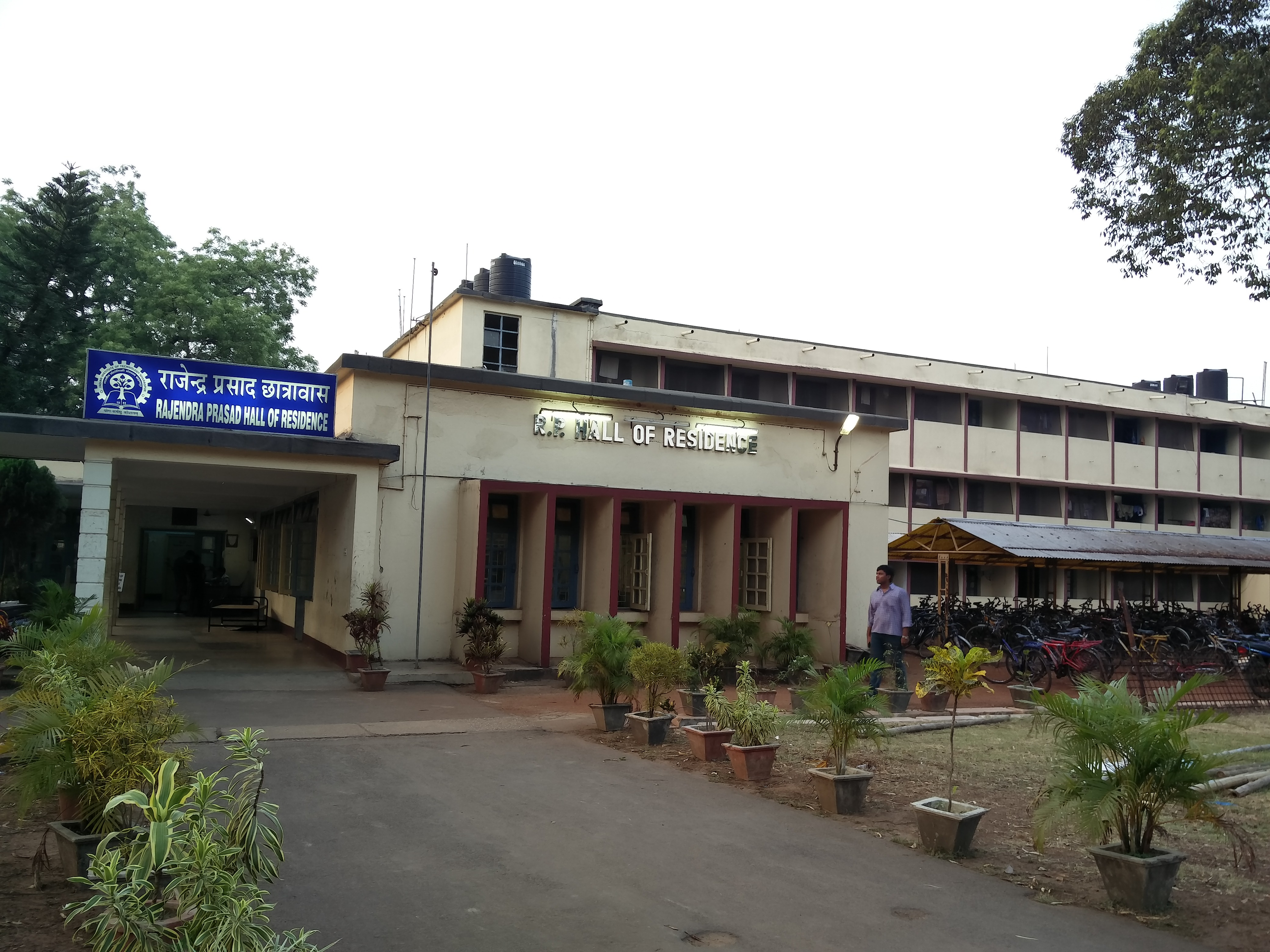
Rajendra Prasad Hall of Residence

IIT Kharagpur provides on-campus residential facilities to its students, research scholars, faculty members and many of its staff. The students live in hostels (referred to as halls) throughout their stay in the IIT. Hostel rooms are wired to provide an internet connection, for which students pay a compulsory charge. Most rooms in the older halls are designed to accommodate one student, but an increase in the number of incoming undergraduate students has led to shared rooms in the first two years. The Lal Bahadur Shastri Hall of Residence and newer blocks of some halls now accommodate three students per room. The oldest Halls of Residence are located in the PAN Loop, named after the Patel, Azad, and Nehru Halls.

==== Halls of IIT Kharagpur ====
- Atal Bihari Vajpayee Hall of Residence
- Azad Hall of Residence
- B C Roy Hall of Residence
- B R Ambedkar Hall of Residence
- Gokhale Hall of Residence
- Homi J Bhabha Hall of Residence
- Jagadish Chandra Bose Hall of Residence
- Nehru Hall of Residence
- Lalbahadur Sastry Hall of Residence
- Lala Lajpat Rai Hall of Residence
- Madan Mohan Malviya Hall of Residence
- Megnad Saha Hall of Residence
- Mother Teresa Hall of Residence
- Nivedita Hall of Residence
- PDF Block
- Patel Hall of Residence
- Radha Krishnan Hall of Residence
- Rani Laxmibai Hall of Residence
- Rajendra Prasad Hall of Residence
- SAM Hall of Residence
- Savitribai Phule Hall of Residence
- Sarojini Naidu – Indira Gandhi Hall of Residence
- Vikram Sarabhai Residential Complex – 1
- Vikram Sarabhai Residential Complex – 2
- Vidyasagar Hall of Residence
- Zakir Hussain Hall of Residence

Undergraduate students choose between the National Cadet Corps (NCC), National Service Scheme (NSS), National Sports Organisation (NSO), or National Cultural Appreciation (NCA) for their first two years of study. IIT Kharagpur has a range of sporting facilities including grounds for cricket, football, hockey, volleyball, lawn tennis, badminton (indoor and outdoor); a state-of-the-art athletics tracks; and swimming pools for aquatic events. Most hostels have their own dedicated sports grounds. The institute used to organise Shaurya, an annual inter-collegiate sports and games meet in October, which was discontinued in 2012.

== Organisation and administration ==
=== Governance ===
IIT Kharagpur shares a common Visitor (a position held by the President of India) and the IIT Council with other IITs. The rest of IIT Kharagpur's organisational structure is distinct from that of the other IITs. The Board of Governors of IIT Kharagpur is under the IIT Council, and has 13 members that include representatives of the states of West Bengal, Bihar, Jharkhand and Odisha, in addition to other members appointed by the IIT Council and the institute's Senate. Under the Board of Governors is the institute Director, who serves as the chief academic and executive officer of the IIT, and is aided by the Deputy Director. Under the Director and Deputy Director are the Deans, Heads of Department, the Registrar, President of the Students' Council, and Chairman of the Hall Management Committee (HMC). The Registrar is the chief administrative officer and oversees day-to-day operations. He is the custodian of records, funds, and other properties of the institute. Under the charge of the heads of departments (HOD) are the faculty (full-time professors as well as those of associate and assistant status). The wardens of hostels are placed under the chairman of the hall management committee in the organisation.

IIT Kharagpur receives comparatively more funding than other engineering colleges in India. While the total government funding to most other engineering colleges is around ₹100–200 million (US$2–4.5 million) per year, IIT Kharagpur gets nearly ₹1,300 million (US$14 million) per year. Other sources of funds include student fees and research funding by industry-sponsored projects. IIT Kharagpur provide scholarships to all MTech students and research scholars to encourage them to pursue higher studies. The cost borne by undergraduate students, including boarding and mess expenses, is around ₹275,000 (US$2,900) per annum. 35% of undergraduate students are given additional financial support based on personal need and economic background, with their annual expenses being nearly ₹64,000 (US$680).

The academic policies of IIT Kharagpur are decided by its senate. It consists of all professors of the institute, and administrative and student representatives. The senate controls and approves the curriculum, courses, examinations and results, and appoints committees to look into specific academic matters. The teaching, training and research activities of the institute are periodically reviewed by the senate to maintain educational standards.

On June 19, 2025, Suman Chakraborty was appointed as the director of (IIT) Kharagpur.

=== Academic Units ===
Faculty of Engineering and Architecture (FoE&A)
Aerospace Engineering	Agricultural and Food Engineering	Architecture and Regional Planning	Artificial Intelligence
Centre of Excellence in Precision Agriculture & Food Nutrition	Centre of Excellence in Urban Planning and Design	Centre of Excellence on Safety Engineering & Analytics (COE-SEA)	Chemical Engineering
Civil Engineering	Computer Science and Engineering	Cryogenic Engineering	Do It Yourself Laboratories
Electrical Engineering	Electronics and Electrical Communication Engineering	G S Sanyal School of Telecommunications	Industrial and Systems Engineering
Mechanical Engineering	Metallurgical and Materials Engineering	Mining Engineering	Ocean Engg and Naval Architecture
Ranbir and Chitra Gupta School of Infrastructure Design and Management	Rubber Technology	Steel Technology Centre	Subir Chowdhury School of Quality and Reliability
Faculty of Sciences (FoS)
Centre for Ocean, River, Atmosphere and Land Sciences (CORAL)	Chemistry	Geology and Geophysics	Mathematics
Physics and astronomy
Faculty of Biosciences & Biotechnology
Bioscience and Biotechnology	Centre of Excellence in Affordable Healthcare	P.K. Sinha Centre for Bioenergy and Renewables	School of Medical Science and Technology
Faculty of Interdisciplinary Studies
Academy of Classical and Folk Arts	Advanced Technology Development Centre	Centre for Computational and Data Sciences	Centre for Rural Development and Innovative Sustainable Technology
Centre for Sustainable and Community Development	Centre of Excellence for Indian Knowledge Systems	Centre of Excellence in Sustainable Development	Deysarkar Centre of Excellence in Petroleum Engineering
Education	Energy Science and Engineering	Environmental Science and Engineering	Geospatial Academy
Humanities and Social Sciences	Materials Science Centre	Nano Science and Technology	Partha Ghosh School of Leadership
Rajendra Mishra School of Engg Entrepreneurship	Rekhi Centre of Excellence for the Science of Happiness	School of Water Resources	
Rajiv Gandhi School of Intellectual Property Law
Centre of Excellence in Public Policy, Law and Governance	Centre of Studies and Research for the Differently-abled	Rajiv Gandhi School of Intellectual Property Law	
Vinod Gupta School of Management
Vinod Gupta School of Management
Dean, Research and Development (R&D)
Centre For Railway Research	Centre of Excellence in Advanced Manufacturing Technology	Centre of Excellence in Advanced Transportation	DRDO Industry Academia - Centre of Excellence (DIA-CoE)
Kalpana Chawla Space Technology Cell	M. N. Faruqi Centre for Innovation	Manekshaw Center of Excellence for National Security Studies and Research	Vikram Sodhi Centre of Excellence for AI-Enabled Geological and Mining Systems
Dr B C Roy Multi Speciality Medical Research Centre
Dr B C Roy Multi Speciality Medical Research Centre

== Academics ==
Admission to most undergraduate and postgraduate courses in IIT Kharagpur is granted through written entrance examinations. Admissions to M.S. (by Research) and PhD programmes are based on written tests followed by personal interviews.

Admission to undergraduate programmes in all IITs is tied to the Indian Institute of Technology Joint Entrance Examination (IIT-JEE). As of 2013, students are required to pass the qualifying JEE Mains examination, followed by the JEE Advanced examination, in order to be admitted to an undergraduate course at an IIT. Candidates who qualify for admission through IIT-JEE apply for admission in one of: a four-year B.Tech. (Bachelor of Technology), a five-year B.Arch. (Bachelor of Architecture), a five-year Dual Degree (integrated Bachelor of Technology and Master of Technology), or a four year B.S. (Bachelor of Science) course at IIT Kharagpur.

Admissions to postgraduate programmes (M.Tech.) are granted primarily through the Graduate Aptitude Test in Engineering (GATE). Other postgraduate entrance exams include the Joint Admission to M.Sc. (JAM) exam for M.Sc., and the Common Admission Test (CAT) conducted by IIMs for management studies.

15% of the seats are reserved for students belonging to Scheduled Castes (SC) and 7.5% for Scheduled Tribes (ST). As of 2008, 27% of seats are separately reserved for students belonging to Other Backward Classes.

IIT Kharagpur is a member of LAOTSE, a network of universities in Europe and Asia exchanging students and senior scholars.

=== Undergraduate education ===
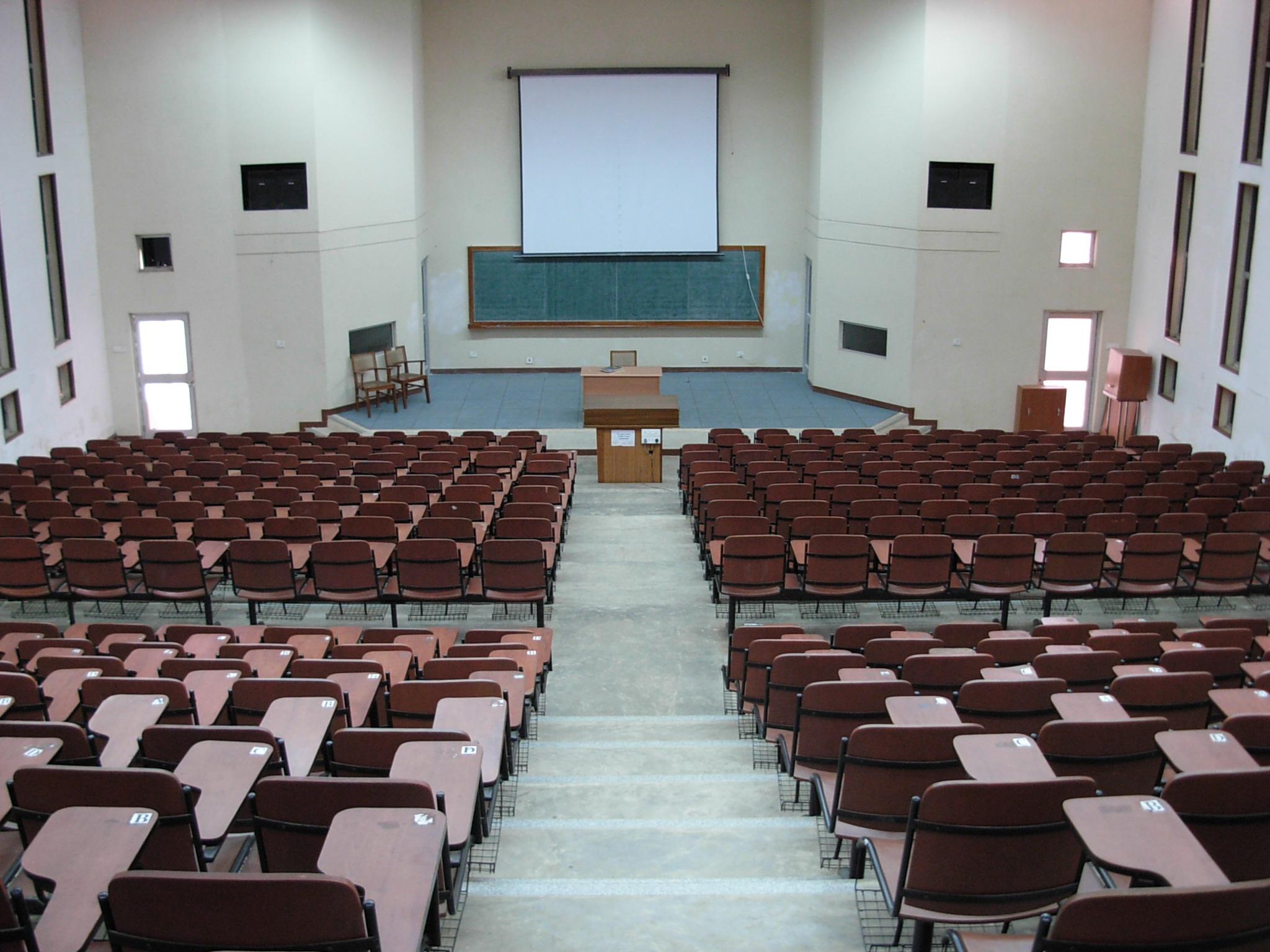
A lecture auditorium in the Vikramshila complex

Some of the undergraduate degrees offered by IIT Kharagpur include the Bachelor of Technology (BTech.Hons) degree, the Bachelor of Architecture (BArch) degree and the 5-year integrated Master of Science degree.

The BTech degree is the most common undergraduate degree in IIT Kharagpur in terms of student enrolment. It is based on a four-year programme with eight semesters. The first year of the BTech curriculum has common courses from various departments. At the end of the first year, an option to change departments is given to students on the basis of their performance in the first two semesters. Like other IITs which evaluate their students on the basis of others' performance IIT Kharagpur also uses relative grading.

From the second year onwards, the students take courses offered by their departments that are known as depth courses. In addition to these, the students take inter-disciplinary courses known as breadth courses. Separate courses from the humanities and social sciences (HSS) department, and management and information technology are also required. At the end of the third year for the BTech and fourth year for the dual degree, students undertake industrial training for a minimum period of eight working weeks as part of the undergraduate curriculum. In the final year of their studies, most students are offered jobs in industries and other organisations through the Training and Placement section of the institute commonly known as Career Development Centre or CDC. Some students opt out of this facility in favour of higher studies or by applying to recruiting organisations directly.

In addition to the major degree as part of the undergraduate education, students can take courses from other departments, and by demonstrating knowledge of a discipline based on objectives set by the department, earn a minor in that department. To stay up-to-date with the latest academic and industry standards, IIT Kharagpur revamps its academic curriculum periodically. In August 2017, an Undergraduate Council(UG Council) was constituted by the institute under the Dean of Undergraduate Studies(Dean UGS) as its chairman and with one student representative from each department to be elected/nominated for an annual term, to assist in the process of curriculum update, assimilate student feedback on different academic policies, and forward suggestions and proposals to the institute senate.

=== Postgraduate and doctoral education ===
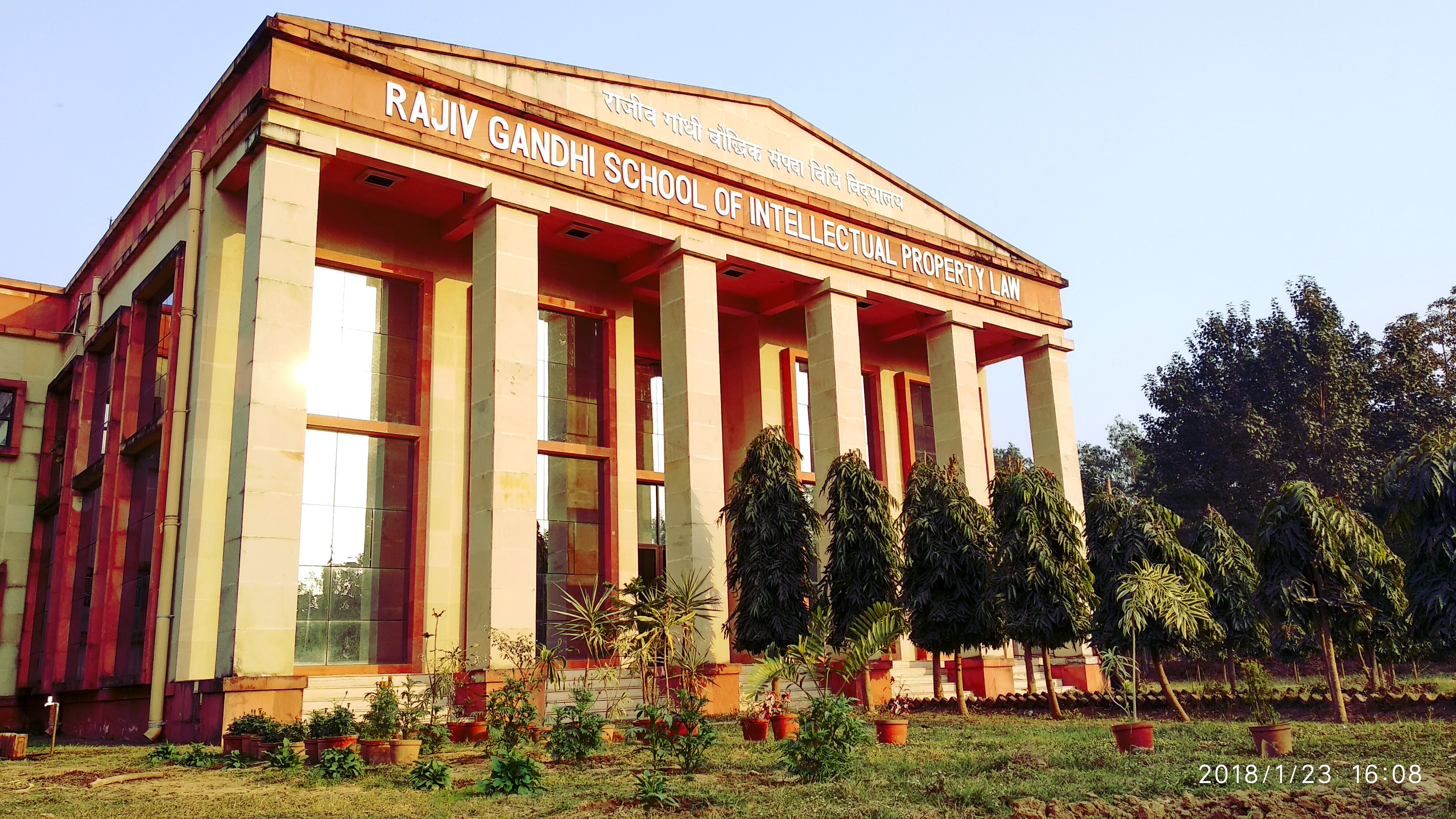
Rajiv Gandhi School of Intellectual Property Law offers law programmes

IIT Kharagpur offers postgraduate programmes including Master of Technology (MTech), Master of Business Administration (MBA), and Master of Sciences (MSc). Some specialised post graduate programmes offered by IIT Kharagpur include Master of Human Resource Management (MHRM), Postgraduate Diploma in Information Technology (PGDIT), Master in Medical Science and Technology (MMST), Master of City Planning (MCP), LL.B in Intellectual Property Law (LL.B Honors in IP Law), and Postgraduate Diploma in Maritime Operation and Management (PGDMOM). The institute offers the Doctor of Philosophy degree (PhD) as part of its doctoral education programme. The doctoral scholars are given a topic by the professor, or work on the consultancy projects sponsored by industry. The duration of the programme is usually unspecified and depends on the discipline. PhD scholars submit a dissertation as well as conduct an oral defence of their thesis. Teaching assistantships (TA) and research assistantships (RA) are provided based on the scholar's academic profile. IIT Kharagpur offers an M.S. (by research) programme; the MTech and M.S. being similar to the US universities' non-thesis (course-based) and thesis (research-based) master programmes respectively.

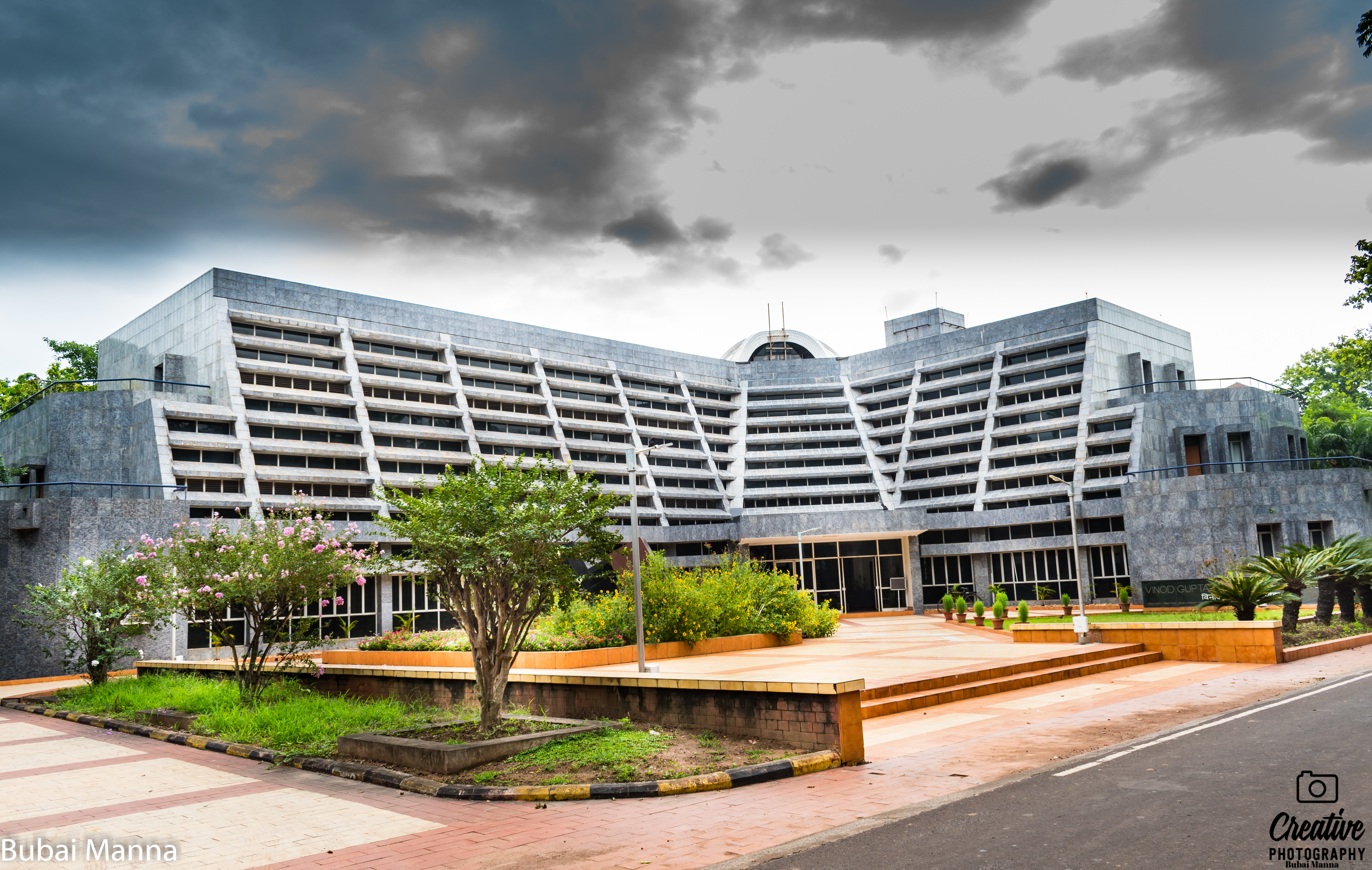
Vinod Gupta School of Management, the first school of management within the IIT system.

IIT Kharagpur (along with other IITs) offers Dual Degree programs that integrate undergraduate and postgraduate studies in selected pairs of branches and specialisations. Most of the Dual Degree programs involve specialisation in the major field of education of the student. For a dual degree involving an MBA from Vinod Gupta School of Management, the selection is made on the basis of an aptitude test of students across all engineering streams. The Dual Degree program spans five years as against six years in conventional BTech (four years) followed by an MTech or MBA (two years).

IIT Kharagpur has a management school (Vinod Gupta School of Management), an entrepreneurship school (Rajendra Mishra School of Engineering Entrepreneurship) and a law school (Rajiv Gandhi School of Intellectual Property Law) on its premises. The Rajiv Gandhi School of Intellectual Property Law has been opened in collaboration with George Washington University. Rajiv Gandhi School of Intellectual Property Law is the only law school in IIT System of the country The National Institutional Ranking Framework (NIRF) ranked the institute 5th in its law ranking of 2024. The School of Medical Science and Technology at IIT Kharagpur is the first and also the "only" of its kind in the country where M.B.B.S. graduates are trained in art and science of medical research with aim to provide a platform for interdisciplinary teaching and research in the field of medical science and technology. IIT Kharagpur will invest around ₹2.3 billion (US$25 million) for its 400-bed super speciality hospital in the campus which will impart undergraduate medical course to students. The institute is expected to start the course in 2017 which will be recognised by Medical Council of India (MCI).

IIT Kharagpur also offers a unique, tri-institute programme, Post Graduate Diploma in Business Analytics (PGDBA), in association with IIM Calcutta and ISI Kolkata, which is ranked 14th globally as per QS World University Ranking 2019.

=== International partnerships ===
In 2021, IIT Kharagpur and The University of Manchester entered into strategic partnership and launched a dual award PhD programme.

On 24 May 2025, the Institute signed a MoU with Technische Universität Darmstadt (TU Darmstadt), Germany, to foster academic and research cooperation. The agreement includes the Study Abroad Program, enabling cross-institutional credit recognition and international exposure for students. This collaboration strengthens IIT KGP's global research portfolio.

In June 2025 the Institute signed a MoU with Swansea University, Wales, to deepen partnerships in advanced manufacturing and materials engineering.

In February 2026 the Institute has signed a landmark MoU with Saint Petersburg Mining University, Russia. The partnership focuses on the critical intersection of traditional energy resources and the modern push for a green transition. As global markets shift toward sustainable practices, both institutions aim to lead research in Critical Minerals, Traditional Resources, AI Integration.

=== Continuing education ===
The institute offers the Continuing Education Programme (CEP) for qualified engineers and scientists to learn technologies and developments in their academic disciplines. As part of CEP, the institute offers formal degree programmes (MTech and PhD) and an Early Faculty Induction Programme (EFIP) under the Quality Improvement Programme (QIP), short-term courses supported by the All India Council for Technical Education, self-financed short-term courses supported by course fees, and certificate courses conducted as distance education. In addition to conducting educational courses, the CEP develops model curricula for engineering education. As of 2006, the CEP has facilitated publication of 103 course curriculum books. The CEP administers SIMAP (Small Industries Management Assistant Programme) and STUP (Skill-cum-Technology Upgradation Programme) on behalf of IIT Kharagpur; the institute being a corpus institute of SIDBI (Small Industries Development Bank of India).

=== Grading system ===
IIT Kharagpur follows the credit-based system of performance evaluation, with proportional weighting of courses based on their importance. The total marks (usually out of 100) form the basis of grades, with a grade value (out of 10) assigned to a range of marks. For each semester, the students are graded by taking a weighted average from all the courses with their respective credit points. Each semester's evaluation is done independently with a cumulative grade point average (CGPA) reflecting the average performance across semesters.

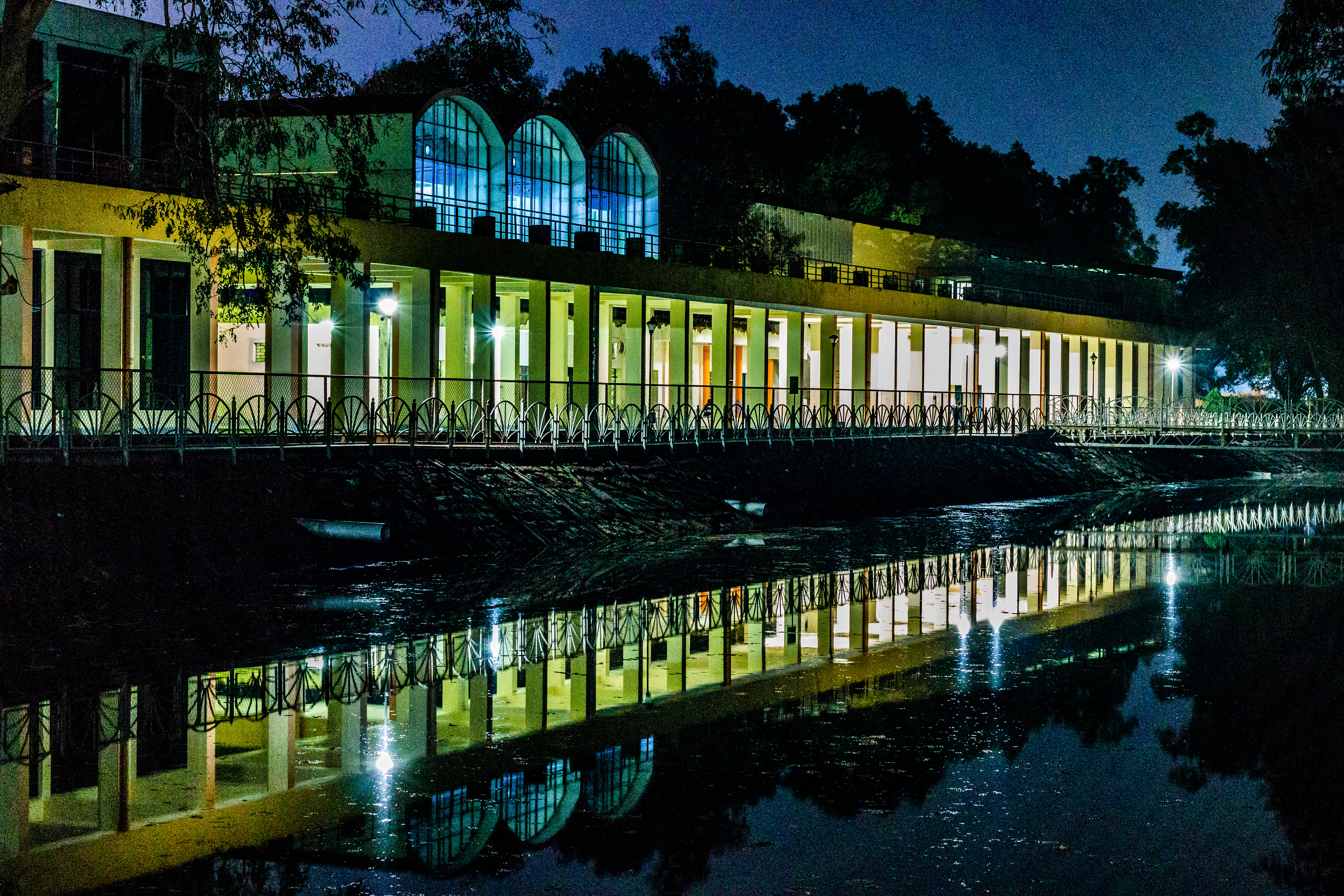
Gymkhana Lake

=== Rankings and reputation ===
In the 2025 QS World University Rankings, the Indian Institute of Technology Kharagpur (IIT-KGP) was ranked 222nd in the world.

University rankings

General – international
- ARWU (2022): 801-900
- QS (World) (2025): 222
- QS (Asia) (2023): 61

General – India
- NIRF (Overall) (2024): 6
- NIRF (Research) (2024): 5

Engineering – India
- NIRF (2024): 5
- Government colleges
- Outlook India (2022): 4

Law – India
- NIRF (2024): 7

Business/Management – India
- NIRF (2024): 19

Architecture – India
- NIRF (2024): 2

Internationally, IIT Kharagpur was ranked 222 in the QS World University Rankings of 2024 and 73 in Asia. It was also ranked 801–900 in the Academic Ranking of World Universities of 2022.

In India, IIT Kharagpur ranked 4th among government engineering colleges by Outlook India in 2022 and 5th among engineering colleges by the National Institutional Ranking Framework (NIRF) in 2024, which also ranked it 6th overall.

The architecture department was ranked second among all architecture colleges in India by NIRF in 2024, Rajiv Gandhi School of Intellectual Property Law was ranked 7th among law schools and Vinod Gupta School of Management (VGSoM) was ranked 19th among management schools.

== Research ==
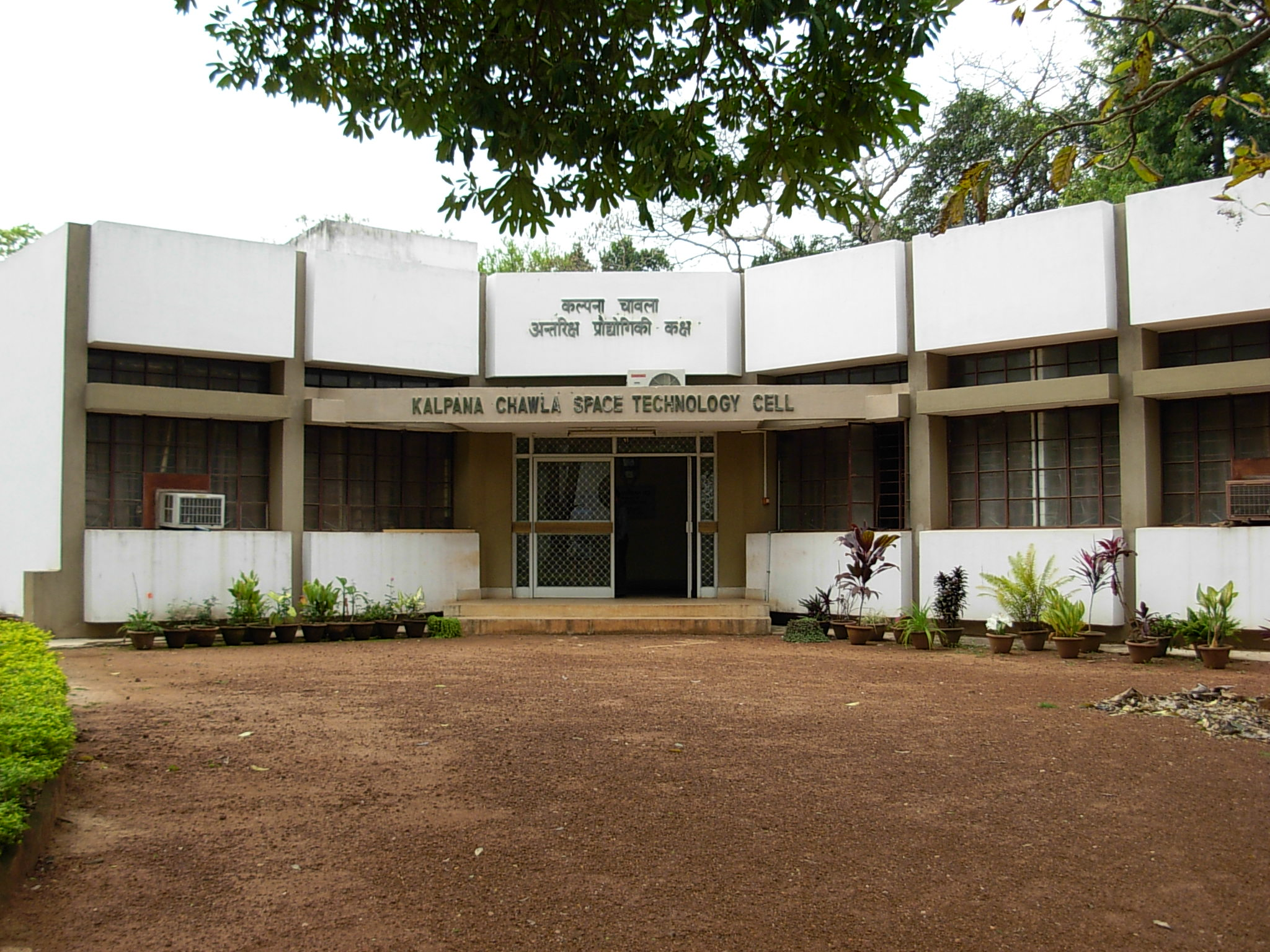
Kalpana Chawla Space Technology Cell

The institute received 171 research revenue worth ₹417 million (US$4.5 million)—and 130 consultancy projects in the 2005–06 session. The institute transferred 15 technologies to industry during the same session. The institute has filed 125 patents and 25 of them have been granted. This does not include patents obtained by individual professors or students. During the same session, the value of the international projects was ₹9.9 million (US$110,000), and the revenue from transferred technologies was about ₹2.5 million (US$27,000). The institute earned ₹520 million (US$5.6 million) from research projects in the 2005–06 session. Major sponsors for research include the Indian Ordnance Factories, Indian National Science Academy, Ministry of Human Resource and Development, Defence Research and Development Organisation, Microsoft Corporation, Department of Science and Technology, Ministry of Communications and Information Technology (India) and Indian Space Research Organisation. IIT Kharagpur has had a cell known as the SRIC (Sponsored Research and Industrial Consultancy) cell since 1982. It handles sponsored research projects and industrial consultancy assignments, and has the infrastructure to simultaneously administer 600 R&D projects.

Indira Gandhi Centre for Atomic Research has entered into a collaboration with IIT Kharagpur to carry out research for the design and development of Fast Breeder Reactors (FBRs). This is a major development that will boost the second stage of India's nuclear power programme.

In 2026, the institute established the Vikram Sodhi Centre of Excellence for AI-Enabled Geological and Mining Systems, an interdisciplinary research hub focused on applying artificial intelligence to mining and geological systems. The centre was created with a funding commitment of ₹15 crore over five years from Vikram Sodhi, Vice Chairman of Mineros SA and Managing Partner of Sun Valley Investments.

In May 2026, Persistent Systems partnered with IIT Kharagpur to establish an AI Innovation Lab within the Department of Computer Science and Engineering. The facility focuses on developing responsible AI for healthcare, finance, and education. By combining academic research with industrial engineering, the lab aims to foster high-impact innovation and prepare talent for national-scale technological challenges in India.

=== IIT Kharagpur IRINS ===
As per IRINS website, IIT Kharagpur college's research is:

- Faculty: 291 Professor, 141 Associate Professor, (222+15+22) Assistant Professors.
- Articles: Journal: 29,310. Conference: 8,300. Books/Chapters: 1,659.
- Citations: 9,02,545.

== Placements ==
Prior to 2006, an internal policy at IIT Kharagpur allowed only Indian companies to apply for the campus recruitment drive. This was overturned by the Career Development Center (CDC) so as to not limit placement opportunities for graduates. Oil giants Schlumberger and Shell offered annual salaries to the tune of $80,000 that year.

The top domestic compensation in 2008 came in at ₹1.8 million (US$19,000) per annum. In the 2011 batch, Goldman Sachs recruited 10 students on a package of ₹2.6 million (US$28,000) per annum. Barclays Capital recruited 11 students with a compensation package of ₹2 million (US$21,000) per annum in December 2009. The highest salary offered till now is ₹17 million (US$180,000) per annum by social networking site Facebook in an off-shore recruitment (of which employee stock ownership plans [ESOPs] were offered valued at ₹10 million) in December 2010. The 2010 batch of BTech students saw 94% placements. Deutsche Bank recruited 9 students on a package of ₹1.5 million (US$16,000) per annum. For the 2012 batch, Facebook has made the highest offer $150,000 to four students. For the 2013 batch, three students have been offered salaries of ₹8 million (US$85,000) per year while eight others have got offers of ₹7.5 million (US$80,000) from Google, Facebook and Microsoft. For the 2014 batch, the highest package offered to a student stands at around ₹9 million (US$96,000) from Google. As of the 2021–2022 academic session, a total of 1723 offers (including Pre-Placement Offers – PPOs) were made by several companies, peaking with a CTC of ₹2.4 Crore (US$301,014) which is the highest recorded CTC amongst the IITs.

As of the 2024–2025 academic year, the annual recruitment drive is conducted in multiple phases. PPOs are extended to students (or directly to the Institute) towards the end of the previous summer internship cycle. Students who accept PPOs are removed from the normal placement process. The CDC enforces a strict "one student, one offer" policy to ensure a fair opportunity to all final-year students. The first two placement phases are typically organised in December and January, followed by an open-hiring session until the end of the academic year.

== Student life ==
=== General Championship ===
The students of IIT Kharagpur compete among themselves in various events held under the purview of open-IIT and inter-hall events, and the results of the latter contribute to the points that determine the winner of General Championship. The four categories in which General Championships are decided are Sports, Social and cultural activities, Technology, and Hall affairs. The women's hostel together participate as a single team in all events with the exception of sports, where women's team do not participate at inter-hall level. IIT Kharagpur participates in the Inter IIT Sports Meet, held annually in one of the IITs by policy of rotation.

The students choose their representatives by elections held under the control of the Technology Students' Gymkhana. A fortnightly newsletter called The Scholar's Avenue, named after the avenue common to the student halls, is published by an independent student body. A Hindi monthly newsletter, Awaaz, is published by another independent student body. Individual halls organise "Hall day" — an annual event that involves lighting and decoration of the organising hall, with a social gathering of students from all halls—during March.

=== Cultural Festivals and Other Events ===
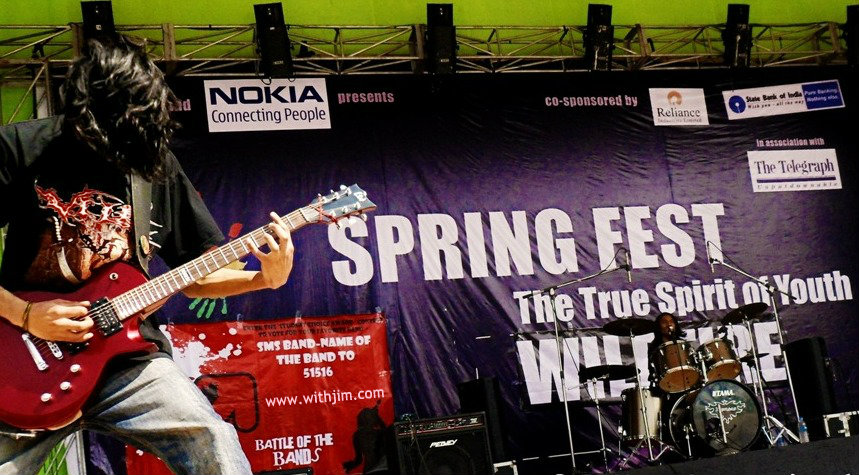
Bands performing at Spring Fest 2012, IIT Kharagpur.

IIT Kharagpur conducts two festivals (known as "fests") during the Spring semester, viz., Spring Fest and Kshitij. Spring Fest is the largest student managed socio-cultural fest in Asia and is held in January. It hosts a range of cultural competitions and stage shows (Star-nights) headlined by leading artistes including Sunidhi Chauhan, Farhan Akhtar, Salim-Sulaiman, Vishal–Shekhar, K.K., Pritam, Kailash Kher, and Shaan. Spring Fest attracts participation from over 150 colleges across India. Kshitij is the biggest techno-management fest in Asia, with a budget over ₹15 million (US$160,000) and prize money worth ₹5 million (US$53,000). Organised in January or February, events include technical workshops, seminars, guest lectures, seminars, conferences, and competitions. Robotix, a student-run annual robotics competition, is organised during Kshitij.

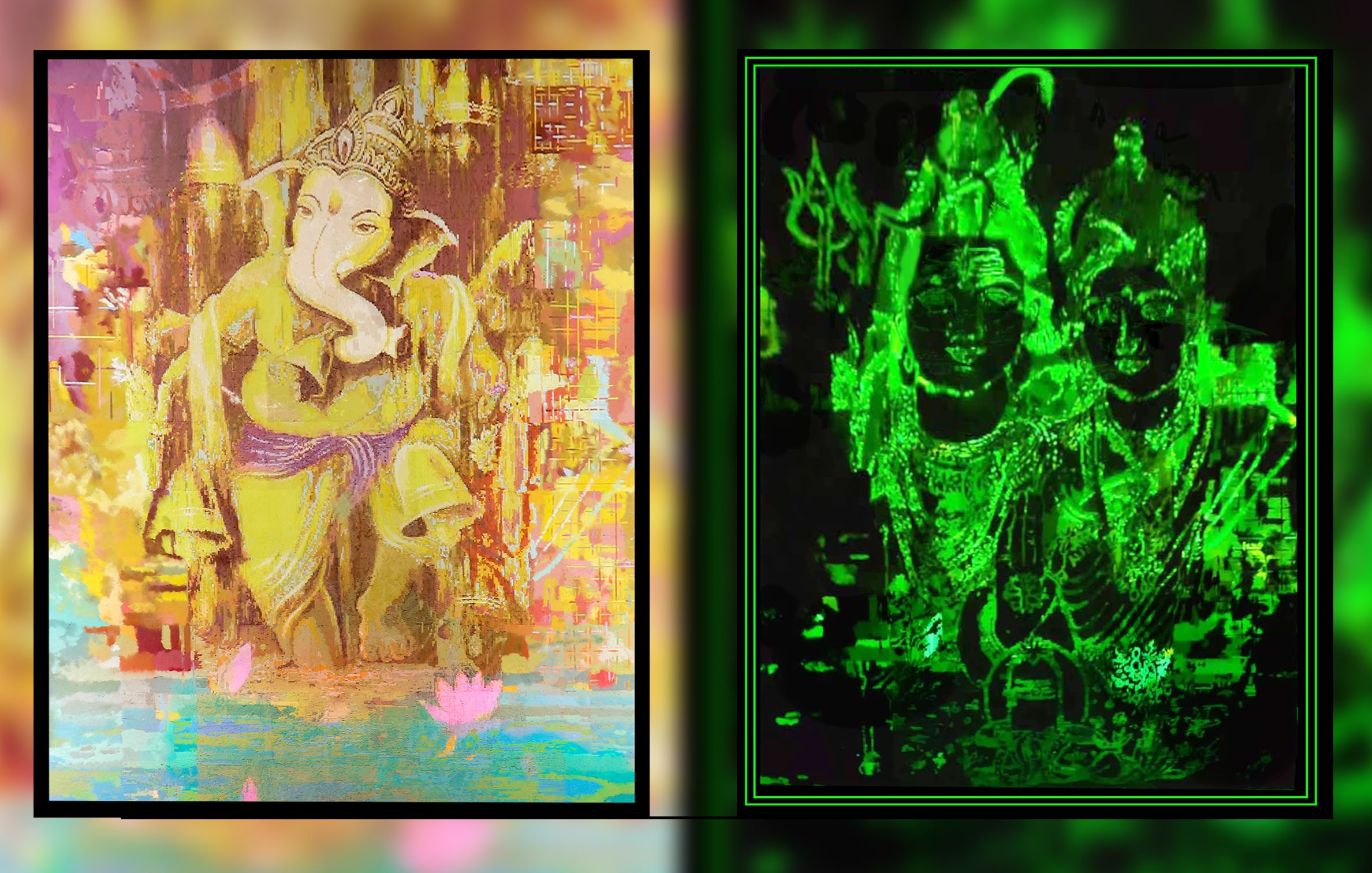
Celebration of eco-friendly Diwali at IIT Kharagpur

IIT Kharagpur organises an annual inter-collegiate sports and games meet called Shaurya. It is held in the autumn semester in October. Events include cricket, hockey, volleyball, basketball, badminton, table tennis, lawn tennis, and aquatics. Workshops for archery, boxing, and handball are simultaneously conducted.

The Department of Computer Science and Engineering organises Bitwise IIT Kharagpur, an online programming contest hosted annually in February. A series of programming and algorithmic challenges are given to attendees in a span of 12 hours. Bitwise 2011 featured 5000 teams representing 80 countries.

In January, the Entrepreneurship Cell organises the Global Entrepreneurship Summit (GES) which consists of guest lectures, workshops, a start-up camp, and other entrepreneurial events.

Academic departments often host individual department fests or conferences, including Esperanza (Department of Electronics and Electrical Communication Engineering), Prithvi (Department of Geology), Samudramanthan (Department of Ocean Engineering and Naval Architecture), and Megalith (Department of Civil Engineering). A petroleum-themed technical event Petrofiesta is organised in November by the Society of Petroleum Engineers – IIT Kharagpur Chapter.

=== Student organisations ===
==== Team KART (Kharagpur Automobile Racing Team) ====
Kharagpur Automobile Racing Team, known as Team KART, is a student group that designs and builds formula student prototype race-cars and represents IIT Kharagpur at Formula Student UK & Formula Bharat. Founded in 2008, the team has built seven cars since, and placed 67th at Formula UK 2013. The team participated in FDC 2015, securing the second position in the Business Presentation and Cost Report event. Recent iterations of the car include 3D printed structures to reduce weight, dyno-tuning for improved performance, a revamped data acquisition system, and a new driver interface. At Formula Bharat 2020, the team was placed 2nd in the Business Plan Presentation event, 6th in Engineering Design, and 10th in overall rankings.

==== Autonomous Ground Vehicle (AGV) Research Group, IIT Kharagpur ====
Team AGV is a robotics research group at IIT Kharagpur, sponsored by SRIC, IIT Kharagpur under the Centre for Excellence in Robotics. The group aims to build a self-driving car for Indian roads. At the 2018 Intelligent Ground Vehicle Competition, the team was ranked 2nd. AGV was a top-13 participant of the Mahindra Rise Prize SDC challenge. The group performs cutting-edge research in the field of robot design, robot control, computer vision, simultaneous localization and mapping, motion planning.

A spin-off venture from AGV, IIT Kharagpur – the San Francisco-based Auro Robotics (now acquired by RideCell), builds self-driving shuttles for university campuses in the United States.

==== Kharagpur Robosoccer Students' Group (KRSSG) ====
KRSSG is another robotics research group at IIT Kharagpur and is sponsored by SRIC as part of the Centre for Excellence in Robotics. The group conducts research into autonomics game-playing robots, specifically soccer, and takes part at global events including RoboCup and the Federation of International Robot-soccer Association (FIRA) Roboworld Cup. KRSSG participated in FIRA 2013 Malaysia, FIRA 2014 Beijing, China and FIRA 2015 Daejeon, South Korea, winning the bronze medal. More recently, the team participated in the 3D Humanoid Simulation League 2016 held in Leipzig, Germany, winning 7th position.

==== Gopali Youth Welfare Society (GYWS) ====
Gopali Youth Welfare Society is a government registered NGO run by students of IIT Kharagpur with the help of professors of IIT Kharagpur and local members of Gopali village. The main initiative of GYWS is an English Medium School named Jagriti Vidya Mandir. Education, uniforms, and transportation are provided free of cost to underprivileged children. The school is located in Tangasole village, Salua outside the IIT Kharagpur campus, with nearly 200 students enrolled from nursery to Grade 5.

==== Entrepreneurship Cell ====
Entrepreneurship Cell (E-Cell) is a student organisation functioning from STEP (Science and Technology Entrepreneurs' Park) with the aim of promoting entrepreneurship among students throughout India. It provides mentoring, support, and financing assistance to start-up companies. It conducts the three-day Global Entrepreneurship Summit (GES) held in January at the institute, and the 20-day Entrepreneurship Awareness Drive (EAD) which consists of guest lectures in 20 cities across India. Knowledge Camp is conducted annually for the benefit of students within IIT-KGP, while the Innovation Platform and Fund-a-KGPian programs continue throughout the year, to recognise and support innovative ideas among students of IIT-KGP. Previous guest lecturers at E-Cell events includeSanjeev Bhikchandani, Vinod Dham, Arjun Malhotra, Rajat Sharma and Kiran Mazumdar-Shaw.

E-Cell was instrumental in the establishment of the Rajendra Mishra School of Engineering Entrepreneurship. The E-Cell has played a key role in the Deferred Placement Programme (DPP), whereby, a student can opt for placement a year after the completion of his/her course, in case they are involved in a start-up company. This is the first time such a programme has been offered at the undergraduate level in India.

==== Space Technology Student Society ====
Space Technology Student Society (spAts) is a student initiative that functions as the official student body of Kalpana Chawla Space Technology Cell (KCSTC), the contact point for the Indian Space Research Organisation (ISRO) at IIT Kharagpur. It is responsible for organising the annual space-themed "National Students' Space Challenge (NSSC)". NSSC is the country's first and largest astronomy and space conference. spAts organizes space-themed talks, sky gazing sessions, guest lectures, and discussion forums within IIT Kharagpur. The group publishes a bi-semester newsletter, 'The Moonwalk', which covers the latest ventures in space technology and astronomy.

==== Megalith – The Annual Civil Engineering Tech-Fest ====
Megalith is the annual technical fest of the department of civil engineering, Indian Institute of Technology, Kharagpur held under the aegis of the Civil Engineering Society, IIT Kharagpur and the patronage of the Institution of Civil Engineers (UK), IIT Kharagpur chapter.

==== Technology Filmmaking and Photography Society ====
Technology Filmmaking and Photography Society (TFPS) is the students' interest club of IIT Kharagpur which provides a platform for students interested in filmmaking and photography. The society organises special screenings of acclaimed independent films, conducts filmmaking workshops, and hosts guest lectures from industry professionals. Biswapati Sarkar of TVF fame is one of the founding members of the society. Alumni of the society have gone on to produce critically acclaimed documentaries and films such as The Unreserved.

=== Disciplinary Committee ===
Students who violate the institute's code of conduct are produced in front of the Hall Disciplinary Committee (HDC), which investigates the case and prescribes punishment if necessary. Students may appeal against the punishment to the Appellate-cum-Liaison Committee known as Inter Hall Disciplinary Committee (IHDC). The IHDC submits its recommendations to the Senate, which finalises the punishment. Extreme cases of indiscipline are referred directly to the IHDC. The IHDC is empowered to penalize students for acts of indiscretion committed anywhere in India. IIT Kharagpur has strict provisions for dealing with physical and mental harassment (ragging).

== Alumni ==
=== Alumni awards ===
IIT Kharagpur recognizes the professional achievements of its alumni through the annual Distinguished Alumnus Award on the Institute Convocation Day. The institute also recognizes alumni who have provided outstanding service to the institute with a Distinguished Service Award. The Young Alumni Achiever Award recognizes alumni aged 45 or less, who have achieved success and recognition in their profession.

=== Alumni initiatives ===
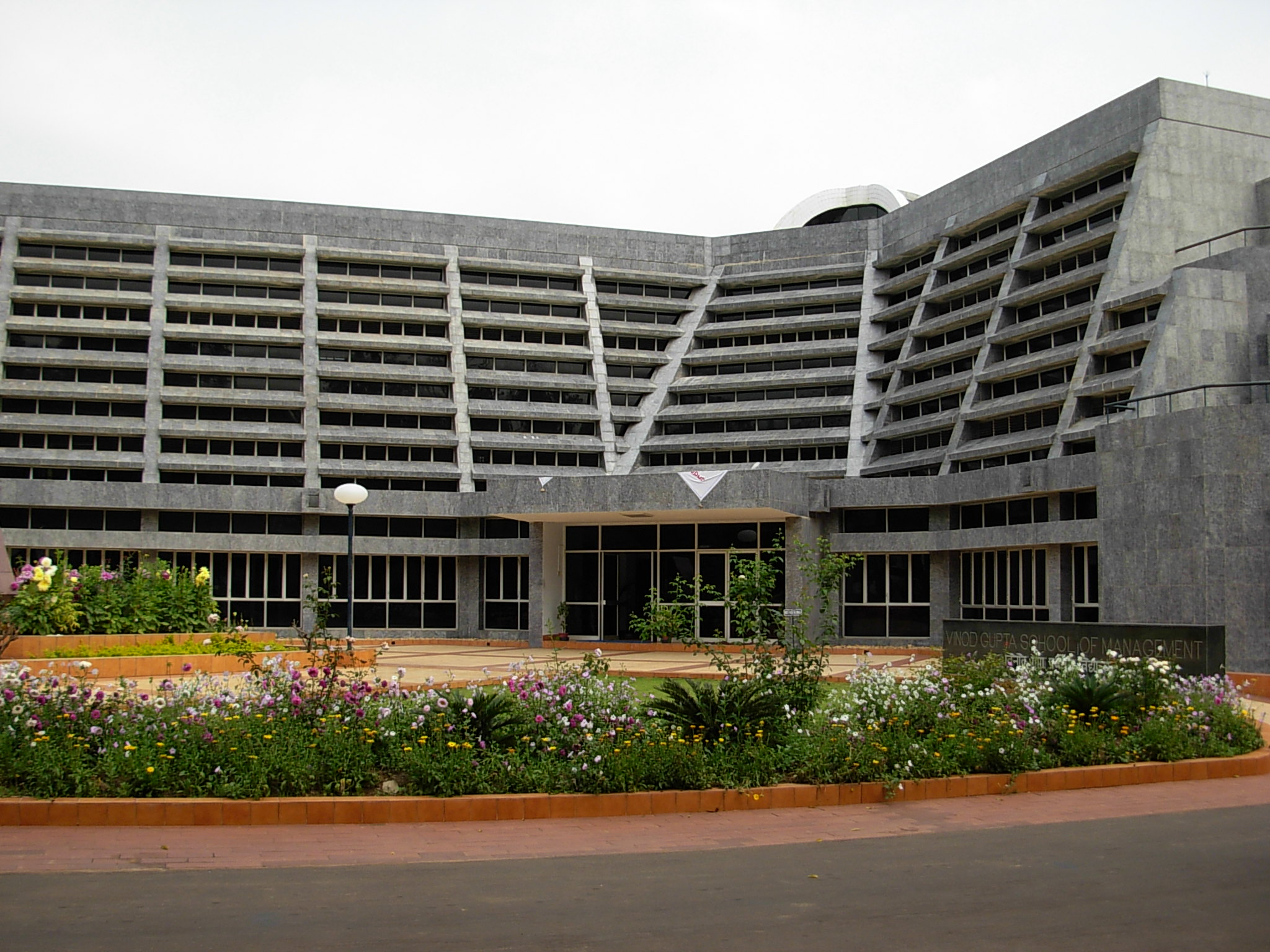
The Vinod Gupta School of Management was built from alumni funding

The Vinod Gupta School of Management (VGSOM) and Rajiv Gandhi School of Intellectual Property Law were established with donated funds from Vinod Gupta (founder, Infogroup) along with support from the government of India. VGSOM started in 1993 with a batch of 30 students. Other centres built by funding from alumni include the G.S. Sanyal School of Telecommunication and VLSI-CAD laboratory. The IIT Foundation, started by Vinod Gupta in 1992, is the alumni association of the institute with chapters in cities in India and abroad. The alumni association publishes the quarterly newsletter KGPian. The institute also publishes a monthly e-newsletter titled KGP Konnexion for alumni. The Dean of Alumni Affairs at IIT Kharagpur is responsible for liaising with alumni. The US-based alumni of IIT Kharagpur have started the Vision 2020 fundraiser, to provide world-class infrastructure (laboratories and equipment), attract, and retain faculty and students. The objective of Vision 2020 is to raise a US$200 million endowment fund by 2020 for technology education, research and innovation related growth of the institute.

== See also ==
- Indian Institutes of Technology
- Indian Institute of Information Technology
- List of universities in India
- National Institutes of Technology
- National Testing Agency
- Joint Seat Allocation Authority
