= Suman Chakraborty =

Indian professor

Director of IIT Kharagpur
- Incumbent
- Assumed office 19 June 2025
- Preceded by: Virendra Kumar Tewari

Professor at Indian Institute of Technology Kharagpur
- In office 2002–2038

Lecturer at Jadavpur University
- In office 1999–2002

Personal details
- Born: August 8, 1973 (age 53)
- Education: Jadavpur University (B.E. 1996); Indian Institute of Science (M.E. 2000), (Ph.D. 2002)
- Profession: Professor
Suman Chakraborty
- Scientific career
- Fields: Mechanical Engineering

Suman Chakraborty is an Indian academic who is currently serving as the director of IIT Kharagpur since June 2025. He is also a Sir J. C. Bose National Fellow (bestowed by the Ministry of Science and Technology, Government of India).

== Early life and education ==
Chakraborty completed his undergraduate studies in Mechanical Engineering from Jadavpur University in 1996. After a brief industrial experience, he joined the Masters of Engineering (ME) programme Indian Institute of Science (IISc), on securing the 1st Rank in the Nationally conducted Graduate Aptitude Test for Engineering (GATE-1997). In his ME program, he emerged as the faculty topper and received gold medal and Senate Commendation for outstanding performance. In 1999, he joined Jadavpur University as a lecturer, a position he held until 2002, while concurrently beginning his doctoral research at IISc in 2000. He received his Ph.D. in 2002, and was bestowed with the Institute level best-thesis award as well as "Best International CFD Thesis Award", for his work on solid-liquid phase transition during thermal processing of materials.

== Career ==
Chakraborty's research interest lies in fundamentals of micro/nano scale fluid dynamics, miniaturization, and its applications focused towards sustainable technology goals for promoting good health and well-being of the underserved. Some notable fundamental discoveries emerging from his research endeavours include: surface roughness-aided slippery flow, massively-amplified ionic-pumping in highly confined water, sticky-flow of water on nano-engineered hydrophobic interfaces, programmable manoeuvring of tiny droplets along arbitrary preferential directions, generating controlled microbubbles on portable spinning-disc, reversing thermally-driven spontaneous migration of nano-droplets – defying common scientific intuitions in all cases. Extending his findings on confined-liquids to soft biological matter, he came up with new insights on puzzling anti-biotic resistance in life-threatening infectious diseases. He also introduced niche low-cost bio-inspired fabrication and analytical tools to unveil several hitherto-unresolved mysteries of blood flow in human-body microvasculature, including the collective-dynamics of red blood cells. He innovated a biomimetic tumour-on-a-chip technology for unleashing the mechanisms of cancer progression, aiding highly-effective drug screening, and throwing light on the efficacy of suggestive therapies.

Chakraborty is the inventor of 'Paper and Pencil Microfluidics' technology - a new class of electrically manipulative miniaturized devices that does not require any sophisticated fabrication facility. This emerged as a backbone of manufacturing niche low-cost medical diagnostic devices, as well as facilitating water desalination and energy-harvesting systems on simple paper-strips. By harnessing such spontaneous ion-water interaction in an interlaced fibrous cellulose network, he further demonstrated electrical power generation using wet textiles, drawing analogies with water transpiration in living plants.

Chakraborty is also known for developing disruptive medical diagnostic technologies for the underserved. He was the first to put-forward a fundamental design basis for all the present-day point-of-care diagnostic tests that are premised on micro-capillary flow. By analysing the pattern formation in a blood drop on a pre-wetted paper-strip, he put forward a new approach of reagent-free screening of anaemic patients in resource-limited settings. He developed a portable spinning disc to perform a Complete-Blood-Count test with virtually no-resource. He also invented a hand-held blood-perfusion imaging device for early screening of oral pre-cancer and cancer outside structured clinics. With success in phase-1 clinical trial, this technology is being adapted for risk-assessment in cervical cancer patients as well. His innovation of a new Piecewise Isothermal Nucleic Acid test (COVIRAP) has emerged as the first of its kind highly-accurate molecular-diagnostic technology for infectious disease detection, albeit with the cost and simplicity of a rapid test. This generic platform technology, applicable for several diseases beyond COVID-19, has been certified by regulatory authorities and commercialized for global dissemination.

Beyond the ambit of technology development, Chakraborty leads a National-level Common Research and Technology Development Hub (CRTDH) on affordable healthcare, funded by the Department of Scientific and Industrial Research, Government of India.

Chakraborty has published more than 525 articles in international journals (including interdisciplinary journals such as Advanced Materials, Proceedings of the National Academy of Sciences - USA, Physical Review Letters, Nano Letters, ACS Nano and articles in journals such as Lab-on-a-Chip, Physical Review, Physics of Fluids and Journal of Fluid Mechanics). Till now 50 Ph.D. students have graduated under his supervision. He has around 25 numbers of patented technologies. These translated and commercialized technologies include innovations on nucleic acid based point-of-care rapid molecular diagnostic technology (COVIRAP), hand-held oral cancer screening device, paper- and compact-disc based blood test kits, rapid screening platform for antibiotic resistance, among several others.

Beyond his fundamental and translational research, Chakraborty has authored original fundamental texts and monographs in classical as well as emerging areas of scientific and technological pursuit. He developed several Internationally acclaimed video courses, under the National Programme on Technology Enhanced Learning (NPTEL). He also established a research-inspired teaching lab of microfluidics.

Chakraborty has been awarded the Shanti Swarup Bhatnagar Prize; the highest Scientific Award from the Government. He has been elected as Fellows of American Physical Society, Royal Society of Chemistry, American Society of Mechanical Engineers, and all the National Academies of Science and Engineering; recipient of the Infosys Prize in the category of Engineering and Computer Science, G. D. Birla Award for Scientific Research, National Award for Teachers, National Academy of Sciences– Reliance Industries Platinum Jubilee Award for Application Oriented Research, Rajib Goyal Prize for Young Scientists, IIT Roorkee Research Awards, Indo-US Research Fellowship, Scopus Young Scientist Award, Young Scientist/ Young Engineer Awards from various National Academies of Science and Engineering, and Outstanding Teacher Award from the National Academy of Engineering. He has been listed among 75 Scientists of India Under 50 years age as recognized by the Department of Science and Technology, and he has also been listed among top-ranked global scientists in fluids and plasma as per an archival research survey from the Stanford University. As per Research.com, he has been listed as National Rank 1 in Mechanical and Aerospace Engineering Research. The Asian Scientist Magazine has recognized him as one of Asia's most outstanding researchers, featuring him in their annual Asian Scientist 100 list. He has also been a Humboldt Fellow.

Chakraborty has received research grants from Government and premiere International funding agencies (British Council, Royal Academy of Engineering-UK, Indo-US Science and Technology Forum, NSF- USA, JSPS-Japan). He has also been a consultant to industries such as General Motors, Delphi, INTEL, SHELL, Tata Steel, ITC, ANSYS. His own start-up envisions novel diagnostic technologies towards fostering healthy life with no distinction between the haves and have-nots.
