= Robotix (competition) =

Indian robotics and programming event

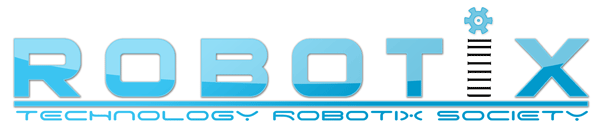
- Sport: Robotics-related games
- Founder: Technology Robotix Society, Indian Institute of Technology Kharagpur
- First season: 2001
- No. of teams: 1,000+
- Country: India
- Venues: Kshitij (festival), Indian Institute of Technology Kharagpur
- Website: www.robotix.in

Robotix is an annual robotics and programming event organised by the Technology Robotix Society at the Indian Institute of Technology Kharagpur (IIT Kharagpur). It is held during Kshitij, the institute's annual techno-management festival. Participation is open to college students. The event allows contestants to showcase their talents in the fields of mechanical robotics, autonomous robotics, and programming.

== History ==
Robotix started in 2001 as an in-house event for IIT Kharagpur students. Beginning with eight teams the event has grown to include over 1000 participants.

In 2010, Robotix celebrated its tenth edition with an array of challenging problem statements. Robotix 2011 conducted a water surface event, R.A.F.T.(Robotic Aided Flood Transportation) in which over 250 teams participated.

== Events ==
Events during Robotix are conducted under three categories: manual, autonomous, and programming/online. In the manual events, participants handle the robot using a remote control. In the autonomous events, the robots act independently; participants are not allowed to control them during their run. In the programming events, participants are given a problem statement and submit code to solve it; competitors are also allowed to submit their solutions online.
