= School of Medical Science and Technology =

Educational and research institute

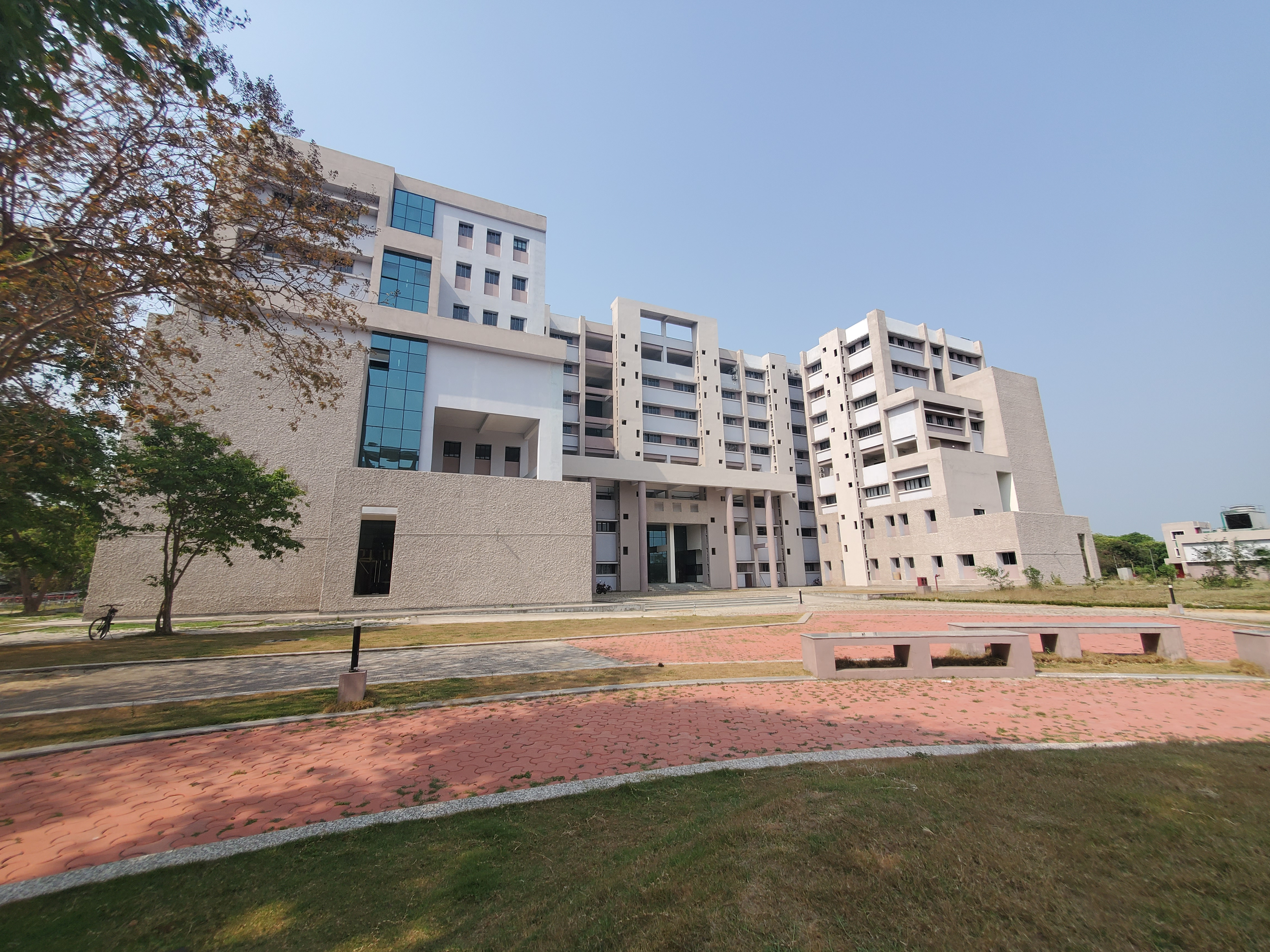
- Type: Education and research institution
- Established: 2001; 25 years ago
- Parent institution: IIT Kharagpur
- Endowment: Government funded
- Chairperson: Dr. Mahitosh Mandal
- Faculty: 11
- Undergraduates: MSc in Medical Physics (3 yrs); MSc in Nuclear Medicine (2 yrs); MSc in Molecular Medical Microbiology (2 yrs) (In collaboration with Tata Medical Centre)
- Postgraduates: Masters in Medical Science and Technology (MMST) [15 seats] MTech in Medical Imaging and Informatics; MTech in Biomedical Engineering
- Location: Kharagpur, West Bengal, India
- Nickname: SMST
- Website: www.smst.iitkgp.ac.in

The School of Medical Science and Technology (SMST) is an educational and research institute affiliated to the Indian Institute of Technology, Kharagpur, India. Founded in 2001, the School of Medical Science and Technology brings together doctors, scientists and engineers to work collaboratively on projects for better healthcare.

The school offers the following courses: Master of Medical Science & Technology (MMST), M.Tech. in Medical Imaging and Informatics, M.Tech. in Biomedical Engineering, M.Sc.in Medical Physics, M.Sc. in Nuclear Medicine, M.Sc. in Medical Molecular Microbiology and PhD Programs. Former Prime Minister Manmohan Singh has described SMST as an innovative model which integrates the two diverse disciplines of engineering and medicine and signals new directions in medical education and healthcare delivery.

== Location ==
The school resides in the third and fourth floors of the Life Science Building, IIT Kharagpur. The institute is about 5 km from the Kharagpur railway station.

== History ==
The School of Medical Science and Technology (SMST), IIT Kharagpur, was started in 2001 to provide a platform of interdisciplinary teaching and research in the field of medical science and technology. The school began with a 3-year program to train doctors in the engineering aspects of medicine followed by a year of hands-on training. This was followed by a PhD program for research in medical technology. Later addressing the needs of graduate students, the school introduced masters programs in Medical Imaging & Informatics and Biomedical Engineering.

While addressing the 57th Annual Convocation and Launching of Diamond Jubilee of IIT, Kharagpur in August 2011, the-then Prime Minister Dr. Manmohan Singh said:

The School of Medical Science and Technology at IIT Kharagpur has done good work in Medical Biotechnology and Biomedical Engineering. It has sought to produce a new breed of doctors who are highly technology savvy, skilled in e-health monitoring, e-medical recording, tele-diagnostics, tele-surgery and tele-medicine.

== Academics ==
The courses offered by the institute are:

=== Masters in Medical Science and Technology (MMST) ===
The school runs a master's degree in Medical Science and Technology, a three-year postgraduate course specially designed for M.B.B.S. graduates to train them in clinical research and medicine. The aim is to provide a platform for interdisciplinary teaching and research in the field of medicine and clinical research which can lead to a better integrated healthcare delivery system. Students spend first two years in doing various course works in medicine and clinical research etc. The last year of the course is reserved for internal or external training either in India or abroad on actual research projects.

The students of MMST also serve as hospitalists at BC Roy Technology Hospital, a hospital with Intensive Care Unit and housing research labs for Medical Imaging, Instrumentation and Telemedicine, clinical exposure provides in the clinical acumen the student for interdisciplinary research. The students are exposed to all kinds of imaging modalities – microscopic and macroscopic – and will work on advanced image processing systems.

This program imparts engineering skills to medical professionals and train them for medical research in areas of Medical Imaging, Molecular Imaging and Image Analysis, Biomaterials and Implants, Biophysics, Medical Statistics, Telemedicine, Biomedical Instrumentation, Early Detection of Cancer, Immuno-technology, Recombinant DNA Technology, Biomedical Simulation, Wound research and so on.

=== MTech in Medical Imaging and Informatics ===
The school offers a master's degree in Medical Imaging and Informatics, a two-year postgraduate course specially designed for BTech/B.E (Electrical, Electronics, Instrumentation). From 2022, the M.Tech. program in Medical Imaging and Informatics is offered jointly with the department of Electrical Engineering, IIT Kharagpur. The aim of the course is to provide knowledge to design CAD (computer aided diagnostics) system. During their first year students undergo course work, to name a few; PIMI (Physics and Instrumentation in Medical Imaging instruments like ultra-sound, C.T, MRI, etc.), Digital Image processing, BioStatistics, MEMS, Pattern Recognition and Machine Intelligence in Medicine, Computer vision, Medical Image Analysis.

The MTech students will be exposed to different aspects of translational health research which will include medical imaging and advanced image processing systems, biomedical signal processing BioMEMS and sensors, Biomedical Instrumentation, Embedded systems, Microfluidics and point-of-care diagnostics, Biostatistics, Biomaterials, Regenerative Medicine, Cancer research, Cardiovascular research, Immunology and Immunotherapeutics, Biomarker Discovery, Herbal medicine, Clinical and Epidemiological research and Molecular virology research.

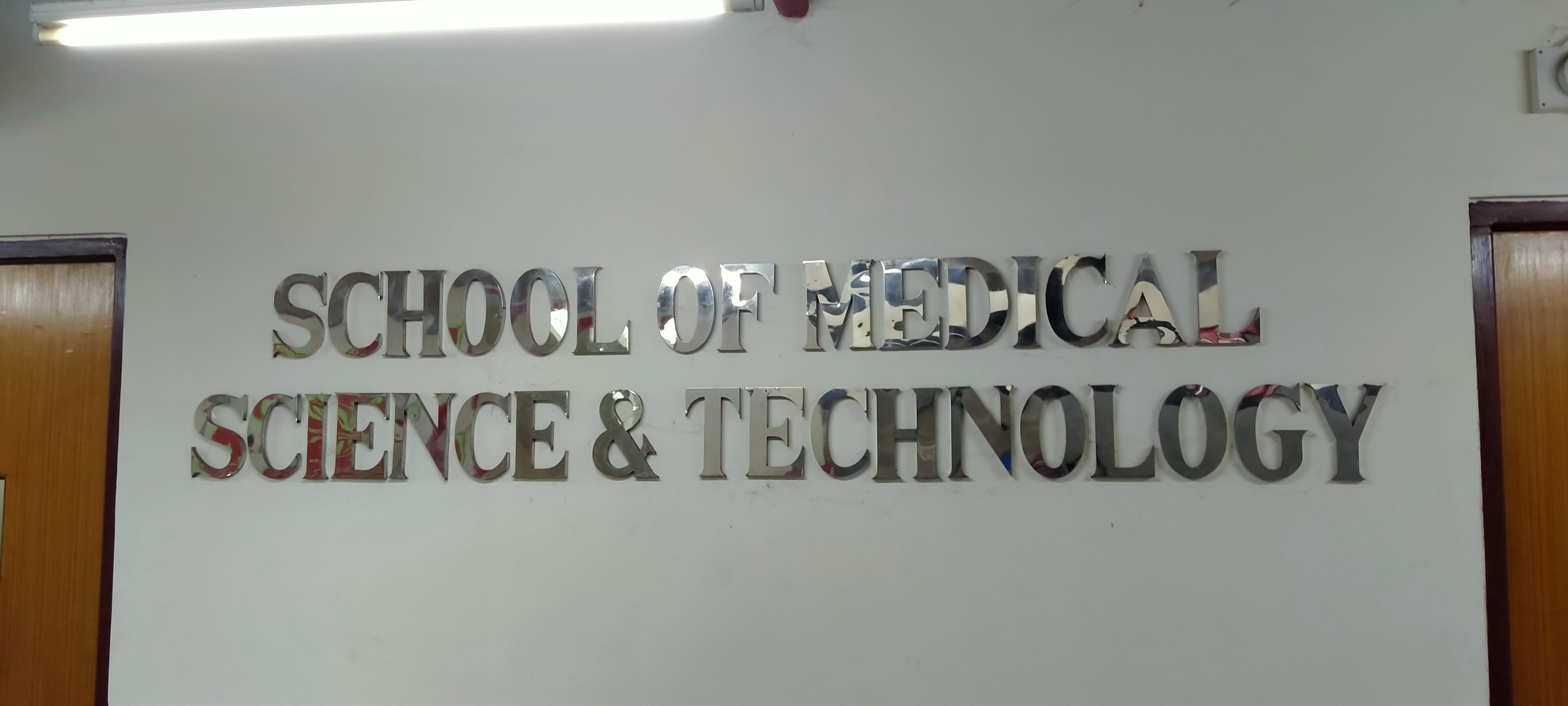
SMST title in Life Science Building, IIT Kharagpur.

=== MTech in Biomedical Engineering ===
The school recently introduced master's degree programs in Biomedical Engineering.

=== PhD in Medical Science and Technology ===
The school offers PhD programs in the areas of core medical science, interdisciplinary medical science fusing engineering methodologies.

== Admissions ==
=== Masters in Medical Science and Technology (MMST) ===
The eligibility criterion for admission to MMST course is the MBBS degree from a medical college recognized by National Medical Commission (NMC) with a minimum of 55% marks in aggregate and having studied mathematics at +2 level (even as additional subject) or from any recognized Open University. Seats are reserved for backward class candidates and persons with disability as per Govt. of India rules. Few seats are also reserved for Armed forces personnel.

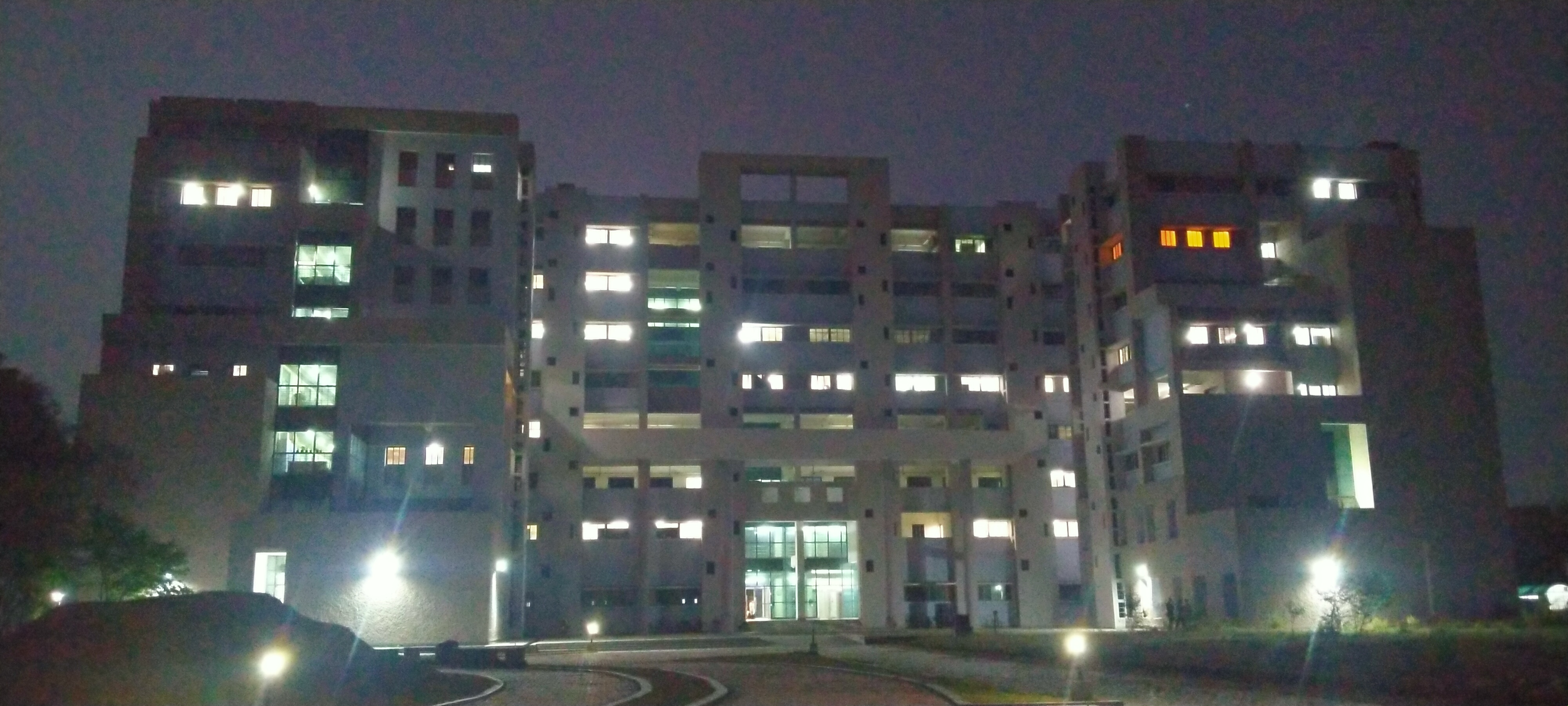
Night view of Life Science Building, IIT Kharagpur.

The final selection is strictly based on an objective type of entrance test conducted by the Gate, IIT. The test includes objective questions from medical domain as well as from +2 level Physics, Chemistry and Mathematics. The entrance test is conducted annually, in the month of April at Kolkata (IIT Kharagpur extension campus). Candidates qualifying in the admission test are called for counselling at IIT Kharagpur before final selection.

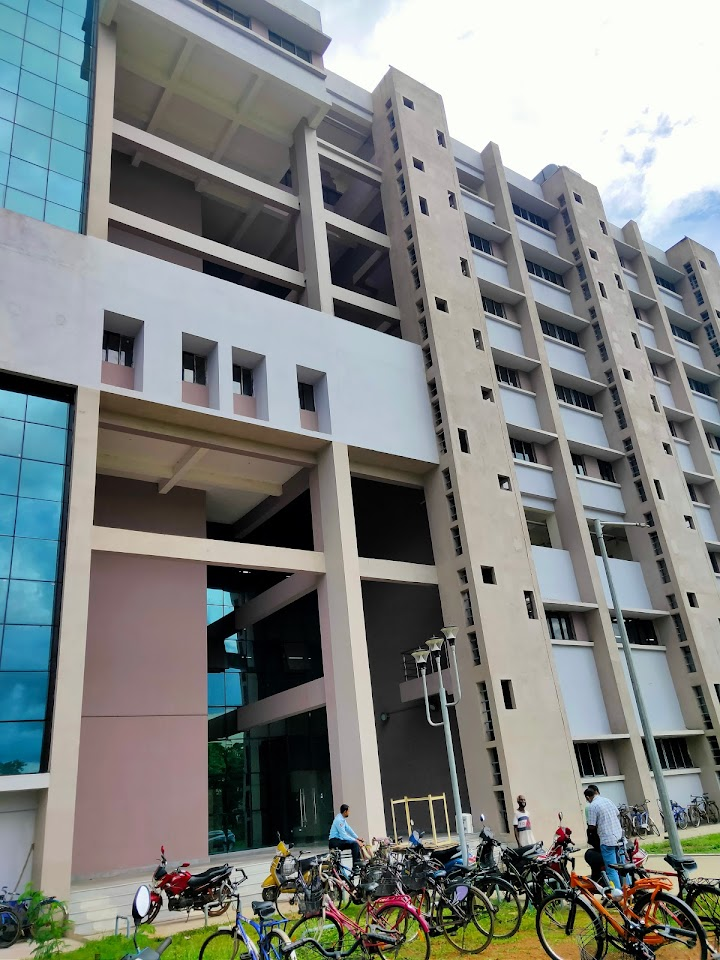
Front view of Life Science Building, IIT Kharagpur.

=== MTech in Medical Imaging and Informatics ===
Admission for Medical Imaging and Informatics is through GATE (EE, EC, IN, BM, CS) score and happens in summer of every year.

=== MTech in Biomedical Engineering ===
Admission for Biomedical Engineering is through GATE (BM) score and happens in summer of every year.

== Laboratories and facilities ==
The students at SMST have access to infrastructure for interdisciplinary research and development activities, some of which are:

Names of the Laboratories:

- Bio-MEMS Lab
- Biomaterials and Tissue Engineering Lab
- Biostatistics and Medical Informatics Lab
- Cancer Biology Lab
- Epidemiology and Public Health Lab
- Herbal Medicine lab
- Medical Instrumentation and Embedded Systems Lab
- Multimodal Imaging and Computing for Theranostics
- Reproductive Health Lab

Apart from these facilities, students have access to research labs of other departments and shared facilities at Central Research Facility (CRF) center of IIT Kharagpur.

== Collaborations and associated laboratories ==
The School of Medical Science and Technology is an interdisciplinary research department. Hence it works in close association with other departments at IIT, Kharagpur such as the Department of BioTechnology, and the Departments of Material Sciences, Physics and Meteorology, Mathematics and Statistics, Electronics and Communication, Computer Science and Mechanical Engineering. SMST is also in close association with the Department of Science and Technology (DST), Department of BioTechnology (DBT) and Indian Council of Medical Research (ICMR) for research activities.

The school has collaborations with many institutions and centres of excellence throughout the globe. Some of these international collaborations are:

- Brain Science Institute, RIKEN, Japan

Corporate collaborations include Texas Instruments (USA), Siemens (India) and Phillips Electronics India Ltd, Bosch India etc.

== Products and patents ==
The research team in the SMST is working on development of a low cost total artificial heart (TAH) since last 4 years. The initial experiments on goats have shown promising results. The research team is waiting for the Indian Council of Medical Research (ICMR) approval for human trials, which will be conducted at the Medical College and Hospital, Kolkata. This artificial heart will have significant cost advantages over the USA-made artificial hearts.

A notable example of a successful research project in collaboration with other universities is the Reversible inhibition of sperm under guidance (RISUG) — a novel reversible male contraceptive developed at SMST.

== Future plans ==
The institute is planning to set up a 400-bedded medical hospital and research center at the campus with a vision of becoming a center of excellence for interdisciplinary research in medical domain. A foundation stone for this medical research center was laid in 2007 by the then President A.P.J. Abdul Kalam. The institute signed a $50-million MoU with the University of California, San Diego in 2009 for this purpose. This project got delayed because of the provisions of IIT act 1961, which prohibits IITs from entering into fields like medicine and tussling between different government ministries. The institute was in constant touch with the Ministry of Human Resource Development and Ministry of Health and Family Welfare to amend the IIT Act to give IITs autonomy to offer medical courses as well. Finally, the Parliament passed the Institute of Technology (Amendment) Bill, 2010, in April 2012. IIT is also in discussion with the National Medical Commission for this project. In June 2012, IIT received fund of Rs 230 crore through a central grant for establishing the Medical school. A 45-acre plot has been earmarked by IIT Kharagpur for what promises to be a modern green building with minimal energy consumption and advance facilities.

Once this medical hospital and teaching institute starts functioning, the institute will offer NMC approved courses for MBBS, MD, MS and DM. The institute, in association with the University of California and Johns Hopkins University, will develop a teaching module which will comprise elements of modelling, simulation and virtual reality in-addition to conventional medical wisdom to produce a new breed of tech-savvy doctors. In the first phase, the main focus will be on postgraduate courses. The number of beds would later be increased to 750.

== See also ==
- Indian Institute of Technology, Kharagpur
- Dr B C Roy Institute of Medical Science & Research
