= Kharagpur (disambiguation) =

Kharagpur may also refer to:

- Kharagpur, a city in Paschim Medinipur district, West Bengal, India.
- Haveli Kharagpur, a town in Munger district, Bihar, India
- Kharagpur Raj, a medieval chieftaincy centred in Haveli Kharagpur of Bihar
- Kharagpur Railway Settlement, in West Bengal
- Kharagpur railway station, in West Bengal
- Kharagpur subdivision, a subdivision of the Paschim Medinipur district, West Bengal, India
- Kharagpur I, community development block, in West Bengal
- Kharagpur II, community development block, in West Bengal
- Kharagpur (Vidhan Sabha constituency), an assembly constituency in Paschim Medinipur district in West Bengal, India
- Kharagpur Sadar (Vidhan Sabha constituency), an assembly constituency in Paschim Medinipur district in West Bengal, India
