= Girimaidan railway station =

Railway station in West Bengal, India

GIRIMAIDAN
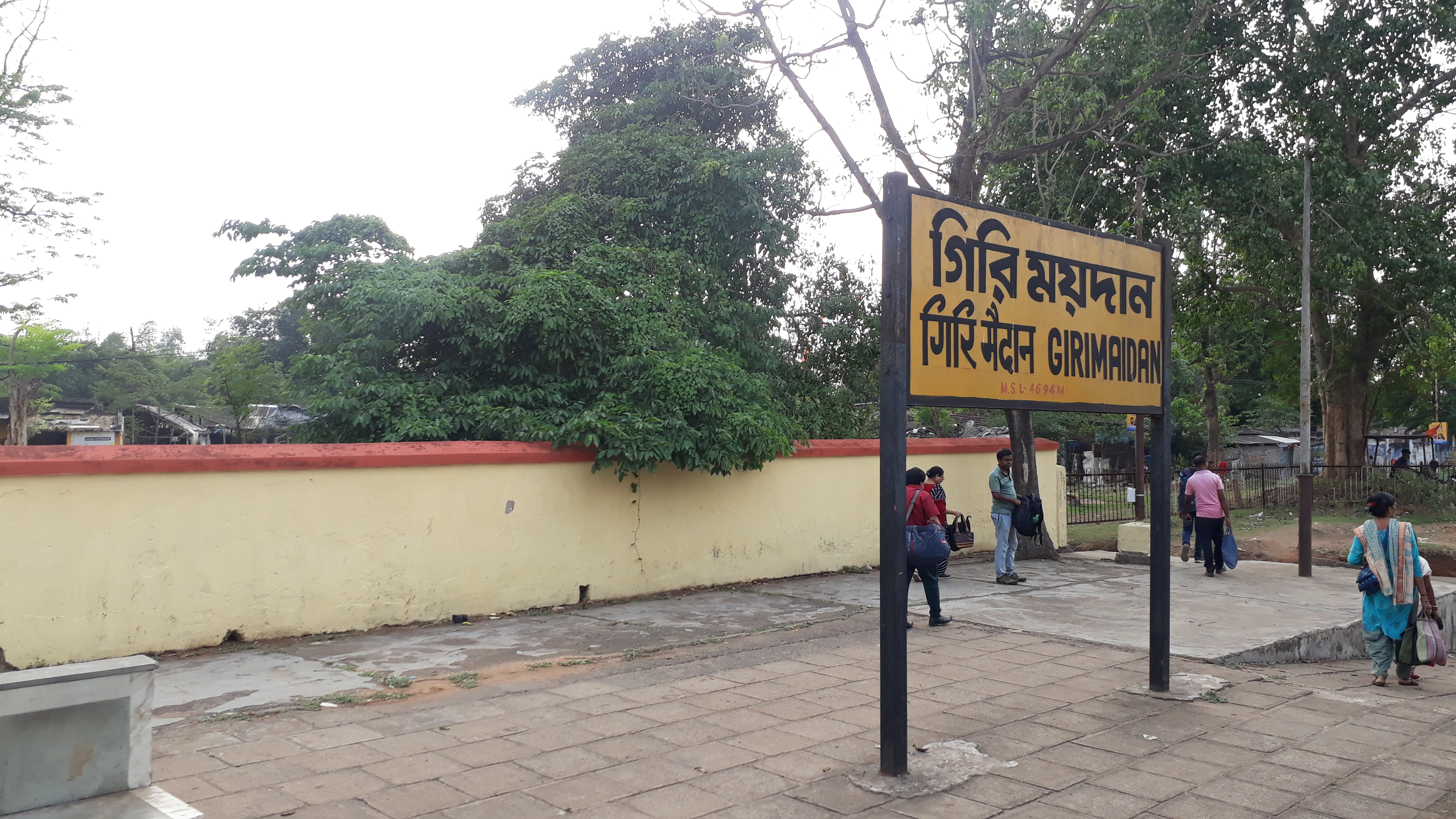

General information
- Location: Kharagpur, Paschim Medinipur district, West Bengal; India
- Coordinates: 22°20′27″N 87°18′25″E
- Elevation: 47 metres (154 ft)
- System: Kolkata Suburban Railway Station
- Owner: Indian Railways
- Line: Kharagpur–Bankura–Adra line
- Platforms: 2

Construction
- Structure type: Standard on-ground station
- Parking: yes
- Cycle facilities: yes

Other information
- Station code: GMDN
- Fare zone: South Eastern Railway

Services
Preceding station	Kolkata Suburban Railway	Following station
Gokulpur towards Midnapore	South Eastern Line	Kharagpur Junction towards Howrah Junction
Route map
Location
- Location within West Bengal

The Girimaidan railway station in the Indian state of West Bengal, serves Kharagpur, India in Paschim Medinipur district. It is on the Kharagpur–Bankura–Adra line. It is 119 km (74 mi) from Howrah station.
