= Maa Manasa Temple, Jakpur =

Hindu temple dedicated to goddess Manasa in Paschim Medinipur, India

- মা মনসা মন্দির

Religion
- Affiliation: Hinduism
- District: Paschim Medinipur
- Deity: Maa Manasa

Location
- Location: Jakpur
- State: West Bengal
- Country: India
- Geographic coordinates: 22°12′12.5″N 87°24′47.4″E

Maa Manasa Temple is a Hindu temple in Jakpur near Kharagpur in Paschim Medinipur district of West Bengal. Dedicated to Maa Manasa, it is one of the most popular temples in Paschim Medinipur. One of the unique features of this temple is that it does not have any rooftop.

This temple is well connected by NH-6 and south eastern railway tracks. The current temple is not very old as it was rebuilt in 2012. Devotees believe that Maa Manasa is actively present here and fulfill wishes of her followers. As per the local people, if someone prays from their heart to Maa Manasa, Maa will fulfill their dreams and wishes.

Huge number of devotees visit this temple every Saturday and Tuesday and offers prayer to Maa Manasa. There is a special puja in the third Tuesday of Bengali Chaitra month.

== History ==
Many centuries ago, located in a dense forest was the small village of Mahisha. Mostly inhabited by farmers, it is located between the present day railway stations of Jakpur and Madpur. Despite having good harvests, the local people were worried due to the excessive presence of snakes in that region. So they always prayed to Maa Manasa, the snake goddess in Hinduism in their minds. In the months of "Sravana" and "Bhadra", they worshipped Maa Manasa on Tuesdays and Saturdays to keep them protected from snakes. Besides protection from snakes, they also worshipped her as their "Krishidevi".

One year, after they had a successful harvest, all the farmers decided to worship Maa Manasa unanimously. They started worshipping her in one corner of the forest. Every year after harvest, each of the farmers used to offer one bundle of their grain harvest to Maa Manasa and this ritual continued for years. They prayed "Maa go, amra chaposha manush, din ani din khai. Peter daye chash korchi. Amader oporadh marjona koro. Sarabochor shontaander dudhebhate rekho. Porer bochor jeno abar chash kore tomake foshol diye pujo dite pari maa."

Around 400 years ago, Jogeshwar Roy, the zamindar of Jakpur received swapnadesh from Maa Manasa. Adorned in her chaturbhuj rup, she told him that she is present in the nearby Manasa forest and instructed him to preach about her puja. Scared, he woke up in the morning and informed about this to his wife and the villagers. En masse, they went to the spot in the forest where Maa Manasa was worshipped. He found that she was worshipped on a huge "uidhipi". The place was filled with innumerous snakes. Jogeshwar Roy ordered the woodcutters to cleanse the area with their axes and instructed the villagers to start worshipping Maa Manasa everyday. A proper road was constructed and the uidhipi was covered with concrete. Beside it, a red lotus was built from the soil of uidhipi. Maa Manasa's puja was started with the celebratory and pious sounds of dhak, sankha and ghanta.

== Puja Rituals ==
Daily puja is performed by the villagers while large crowds gather on Tuesdays and Saturdays to worship Maa Manasa. On special days like Manasa Puja, thousands of devotees gather here to pray to Maa Manasa. The unique feature of this temple is that there are no priests present. So the devotees have to give the puja by themselves. The temple also doesn't have a roof, making it different from most of the other temples constructed following the Bengal architecture.

There is a faith that devotees can give puja only after taking a bath and cleansing themselves. People give "pranami" as per their wish and do "manat" to resolve their problems. Since there are no priests to read aloud the mantras, people do their "manat" with incense sticks, sindoor and flower garlands. The prasad is cooked by the devotees themselves.

== How to reach ==
Jakpur is well connected by highways and railways:

- Jakpur to Kharagpur, Panskura,Kolaghat, Kolkata
- Jakpur to Midnapur, Keshpur, Chandrakona, Ghatal
- Jakpur to Panskura Railways
