= Madpur railway station =

Railway station in West Bengal, India

Madpur
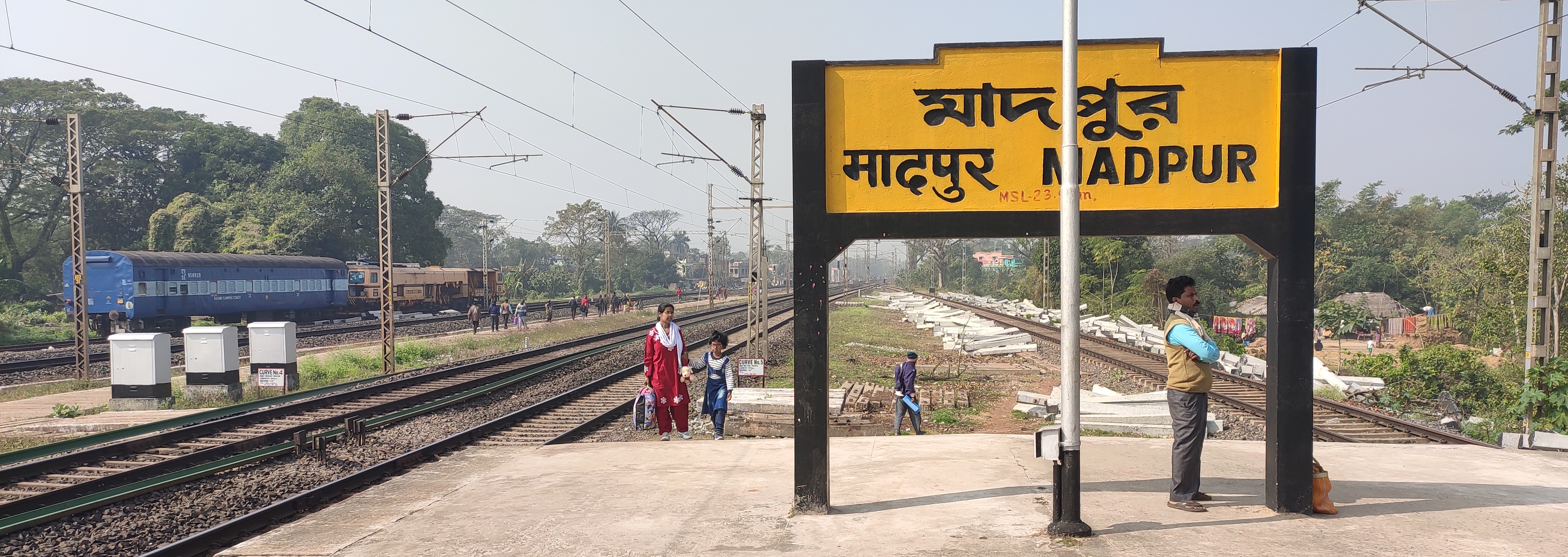
- Madpur railway station

General information
- Location: Madpur, Paschim Medinipur district, West Bengal; India
- Coordinates: 22°22′09″N 87°26′35″E
- Elevation: 27 metres (89 ft)
- System: Kolkata Suburban Railway station
- Owner: Indian Railways
- Line: Howrah–Kharagpur line
- Platforms: 5

Construction
- Structure type: Standard on-ground station
- Parking: No
- Cycle facilities: yes

Other information
- Station code: MPD
- Fare zone: South Eastern Railway

History
- Opened: 1900
- Electrified: 1967–69

Services
Preceding station	Kolkata Suburban Railway	Following station
Jakpur towards Midnapore	South Eastern Line Howrah–Kharagpur line	Shyam Chak towards Howrah Junction
Route map
Location
- Location within West Bengal

The Madpur railway station in the Indian state of West Bengal, serves Madpur, India in Paschim Medinipur district. It is on the Howrah–Kharagpur line. It is 101 km (63 mi) from Howrah Station.

== History ==
Madpur railway station is situated in Kharagpur, West Bengal. Station code is MPD. It is a small railway station between Howrah and Kharagpur. Neighbourhood stations are Jakpur and Shyam Chak and near by major railway station is Kharagpur Jn. Local EMU trains Howrah–Kharagpur local, Santragachi–Kharagpur local, Kharagpur–Howrah local, Kharagpur–Santragachi local, Howrah–Midnapore Local train stop here. The Howrah–Kharagpur line was opened in 1900. The Howrah–Kharagpur stretch has three lines. There is a plan to build a fourth line for the Santragachi–Panskura–Kharagpur stretch. The Howrah–Kharagpur line was electrified in 1967–69.
