= Hijli Kingdom =

Early modern kingdom in Eastern India

The Hijli Kingdom existed between 1687 and 1886 in the eastern part of India. Initially Hijli was a small island village on the banks of the Rasulpur River as it flows to the Bay of Bengal. It developed into a port town in 1687. Slowly, it converted into a province or kingdom covering parts of Bengal and Orissa. The Contai basin also belonged to this kingdom. Mansingh is believed to be the founder King of Hijli. It had important towns like Tamluk or Tamralipta, Panskura, along with Keleghai and Haldi rivers on the north, the south and east sides bounded by the Bay of Bengal and Kharagpur, Keshiary, Dantan and Jaleswar on the west. The capital of Hijli was in Bahiri up to 1628 and afterwards it was shifted to Hijli. This kingdom was ruled for some years by Taj Khan, a disciple of Guru Peer Mackdram Sha Chisti. Today, his shrine is venerated at the Hijli Sharif Dargah, a pilgrimage site in the Purba Medinipur district. It was also ruled sequentially by Gupta, Gauda, Pala, Bengal Sultanate and Sena dynasties and also by Mughals. It is known that Hijli had excellent business and trade centers during the reign of Hindu Kings and continued during the Mughal dynasty.

Captain Nicolson was the first British colonialist to invade Hijli and captured the port only. Afterwards, in 1687, Job Charnock, with 400 soldiers, captured Hijli, defeating Hindu and Mughal Emperors. A war broke out with the Mughal Empire, and a treaty was signed between Job Charnock and the Mughul Emperor. The loss suffered by Job Charnock, forced him to leave Hijli and proceed towards Uluberia while the Mughal Emperor continued to rule the kingdom. From there they finally settled at Sutanuti, and slowly established Calcutta (now Kolkata) for their business in eastern India. This was the start of East India Company in India. It was at its peak in 1754 and the prosperity of Hijli Province during this period was beyond description.

Towards the second half of the 18th century, another Port town Khejuri came into existence, primarily set up by the British for carrying out trade with European countries. Khejuri was also an island set up on the banks of River Koukhali. Development of this region because of Khejuri and Hijli Port can be gauged by the fact that the first Indian Telegraph Office was established in 1852, connecting Khejuri with Calcutta. In the devastating cyclone of 1864, both the ports got destroyed. The islands have since got merged with the main land. Hijli as we know it today, in Kharagpur, is only a very small part of erstwhile Hijli Province and was created for establishing administrative offices and a jail known as Hijli Detention Camp by the British in the 19th century. It is curious that almost the entire Kharagpur subdivision of today has boundaries identical to the Hijli Province. In May 1950, the first Indian Institute of Technology, IIT Kharagpur was established surrounding the area of Hijli Detention Camp.
