= Raja Haridas =

King of Hijli kingdom

- King of Hijli
- Reign: 1359-1392
- Successor: Baishnavcharan and Rajkumari Prava
- Born: Hijli
- Spouse: Bibhabati Devi
- Father: Radhikaprasad
- Religion: Hinduism, Shaivism

Raja Haridas, also known as Raja Haricharan Das Bhuinya, was a Bengali Hindu Shaiva King of Hijli. He ruled the Hijli Kingdom as an independent ruler at a time when the entire Bengal region was under the Bengal Sultan, Sikandar Shah.

== Background ==
Raja Haridas was the ruler of the ancient Hijli or Kajlagarh Raj. He was the 21st descendant of the Mahishya Raja Mukundadas Jana Nayak, the founder of the lineage. In the mid-14th century, he ascended the throne of Hijli and ruled as an independent sovereign. During his reign, the Hijli region and along with vast areas of southwestern Bengal, became more politically consolidated and culturally enriched.

== Battle of Rasulpur ==
=== Background ===
In 1359 AD, when the Sultan of Gauda, Sikandar Shah, declared a rebellion against the Sultan of Delhi, Firuz Shah Tughlaq, he sought the assistance of Raja Haridas of Hijli. However, Raja Haridas agreed to help on one condition: Sikandar Shah must cease the persecution of the Hindu population in Gauda, only then would Haridas support him in the war. Sikandar Shah rejected the condition and chose to go to war against the Delhi Sultan on his own.

He was defeated in battle and was later compelled to sign a peace treaty with Firuz Shah Tughlaq. Through this agreement, Sikandar Shah continued to rule Gauda as a sort of vassal or allied ruler under the authority of Delhi. Following the treaty, he gradually began to expand his influence and dominion across the entire Bengal region and part of this expansionist strategy, in 1367AD, he launched a sudden attack on the Kingdom of Hijli.

=== Result ===
With the support of the Delhi Sultan, Sikandar Shah attacked the Kingdom of Hijli, commanding an army of 80,000 Pathan and Turkic soldiers and a powerful naval fleet. In response, Raja Haridas engaged him in battle with his own large force of warriors and an equally formidable navy. A fierce and prolonged battle took place over three days near the banks of the Rasulpur River, where Sikandar Shah was ultimately defeated by Raja Haridas. The defeated Sultan begged for his life before the King of Hijli. As compensation for the attack, he offered a vast amount of wealth and numerous cannons as tribute. Accepting the offering, Raja Haridas spared his life, and the Sultan fled the battlefield in disgrace. As a result of this battle, 80,000 Pathan and Turkic soldiers and 40,000 Bengali warriors of Hijli were killed.

== Downfall of Kingdom ==
During the reign of Gobardhan Das Bhuinya, the 24th king of the Hijli royal dynasty, Isa Khan invaded the Kingdom of Hijli and defeated Raja Gobardhan in 1592 AD. Following the battle, a treaty was signed, and Gobardhan was reinstated as a military commander under Isa Khan. As a result, for the first time, Hijli lost its independence, descendants of the family still ruled the Kingdom of Kajlagarh.

== See also ==
- Hijli
- Mahishya
- Sikandar Shah
- Isa Khan of Bengal
