= Gokulpur railway station =

Railway station in West Bengal

GOKULPUR
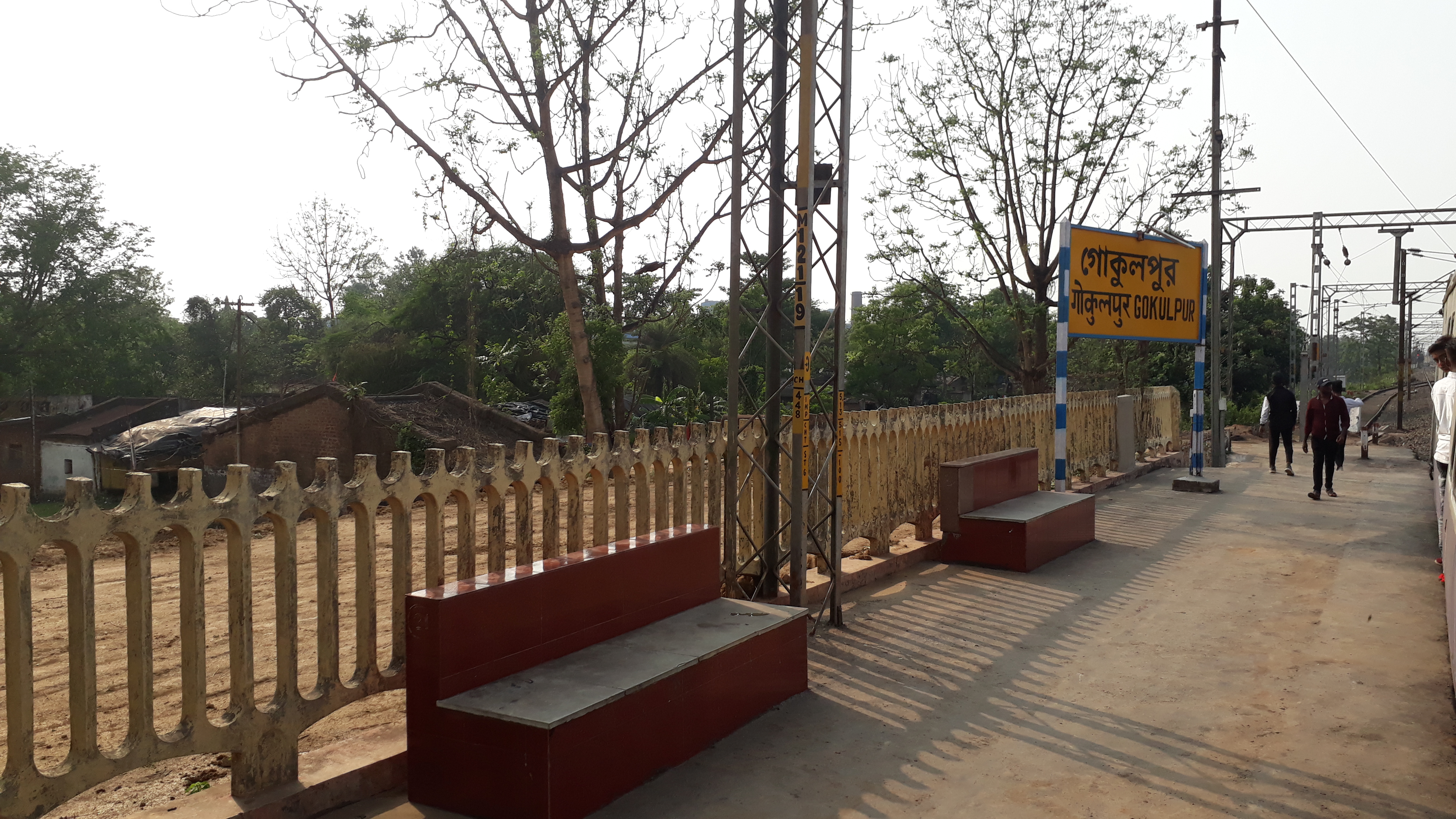
- Gokulpur railway station

General information
- Location: Amba, Gokulpur, Paschim Medinipur district, West Bengal; India
- Coordinates: 22°22′32″N 87°17′38″E
- Elevation: 37 metres (121 ft)
- System: Indian Railways station and Kolkata Suburban Railway station
- Owner: Indian railway
- Operator: South Eastern Railways
- Line: Kharagpur–Bankura–Adra line
- Platforms: 2
- Tracks: 4

Construction
- Structure type: At Ground

Other information
- Status: Functioning
- Station code: GKL
- Zone(s): South Eastern Railway
- Division(s): Kharagpur

History
- Opened: April 1903; 123 years ago
- Former names: Bengal Nagpur Railway

Services
| Preceding station | Kolkata Suburban Railway | Following station |
|---|---|---|
| Cossye Halt towards Midnapore | South Eastern Line | Girimaidan towards Howrah Junction |
Route map
Location
- Location within West Bengal Location within India

Gokulpur railway station is a railway station on Kharagpur–Bankura–Adra line in Kharagpur railway division of South Eastern Railway zone. It is situated at Amba, Gokulpur of Paschim Medinipur district in the Indian state of West Bengal.

== History ==
In 1901, the Kharagpur–Midnapur branch line was opened. The Midnapore–Jharia extension of the Bengal Nagpur Railway, passing through Bankura district was opened in 1903–04. The Adra–Bheduasol sector was electrified in 1997–98 and the Bheduasol–Salboni sector in 1998–99.
