= Jakpur railway station =

Railway station in West Bengal, India

Jakpur
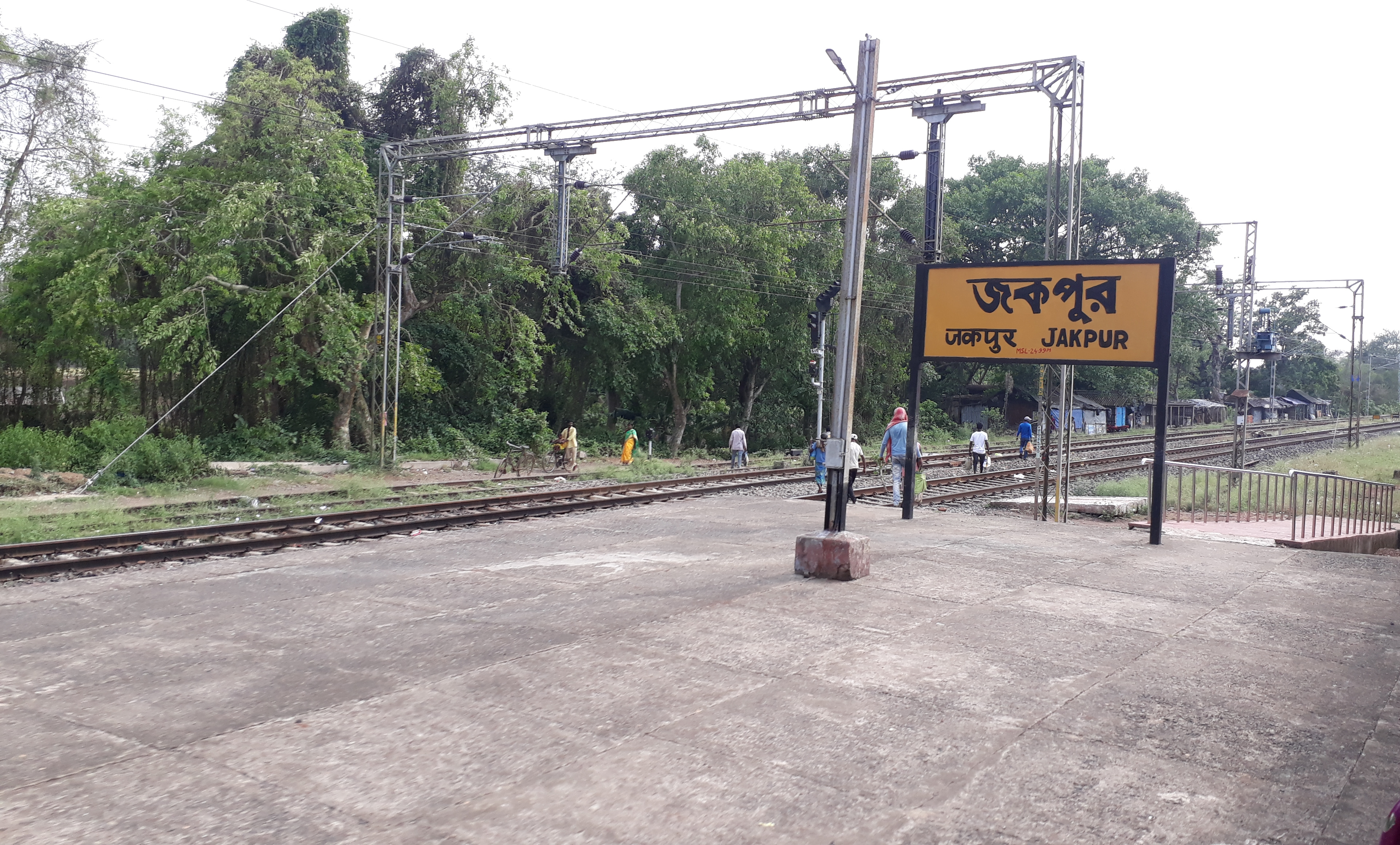
- Jakpur railway station

General information
- Location: Jakpur, Paschim Medinipur district, West Bengal; India
- Coordinates: 22°21′44″N 87°23′22″E
- Elevation: 27 metres (89 ft)
- System: Kolkata Suburban Railway station
- Owner: Indian Railways
- Line: Howrah–Kharagpur line
- Platforms: 4

Construction
- Structure type: Standard on-ground station
- Parking: No
- Cycle facilities: yes

Other information
- Station code: JPR
- Fare zone: South Eastern Railway

History
- Opened: 1900
- Electrified: 1967–69

Services
Preceding station	Kolkata Suburban Railway	Following station
Kharagpur towards Midnapore	South Eastern Line Howrah–Kharagpur line	Madpur towards Howrah Junction
Route map
Location
- Location within West Bengal

The Jakpur railway station in the Indian state of West Bengal, serves Jakpur, India in Paschim Medinipur district. It is on the Howrah–Kharagpur line. It is 107 km (66 mi) from Howrah Station.

== History ==
Jakpur railway station is situated in Jakpur Kharagpur, West Bengal. The station code is JPR. It is a small railway station located between Howrah and Kharagpur. Neighbouring stations are Kharagpur Junction and Madpur, with Kharagpur Junction being the nearest major railway station. Local EMU trains such as Howrah–Kharagpur local, Santragachi–Kharagpur local, Kharagpur–Howrah local, Kharagpur–Santragachi local, Howrah–Midnapore Local train stop here. The Howrah–Kharagpur line was opened in 1900. The Howrah–Kharagpur stretch has three tracks, and there are plans to build a fourth line for the Santragachi–Panskura–Kharagpur stretch. The Howrah–Kharagpur line was electrified between 1967 and 1969.
