= Cossye Halt railway station =

Railway station in West Bengal, India

Cossye Halt

General information
- Location: Kangsabati River bank, Paschim Medinipur district, West Bengal; India
- Coordinates: 22°24′27″N 87°17′29″E
- Elevation: 35 metres (115 ft)
- System: Indian Railway and Kolkata Suburban Railway station
- Owner: Indian railway
- Operator: South Eastern Railways
- Line: Kharagpur–Bankura–Adra line
- Platforms: 2
- Tracks: 2

Construction
- Structure type: At Ground

Other information
- Status: Functioning
- Station code: CSY
- Zone(s): South Eastern Railway
- Division(s): Kharagpur railway division

History
- Opened: 1903–04
- Former names: Bengal Nagpur Railway

Services
Preceding station	Indian Railways	Following station
Midnapore towards Adra Junction	South Eastern Railway zone Kharagpur–Bankura–Adra line	Gokulpur towards Kharagpur Junction
Preceding station	Kolkata Suburban Railway	Following station
Midnapore Terminus	South Eastern Line	Gokulpur towards Howrah Junction
Route map
Location
- Location within West Bengal Location within India

Cossye Halt railway station is a halt railway station on the Kharagpur–Bankura–Adra line in Kharagpur railway division of South Eastern Railway zone. It is situated beside the Kangsabati River Bank of Paschim Medinipur district in the Indian state of West Bengal.

== History ==
In 1901, the Kharagpur–Midnapur Branch line was opened. The Midnapore–Jharia extension of the Bengal Nagpur Railway, passing through Bankura District was opened in 1903–04. The Adra–Bheduasol sector was electrified in 1997–98 and the Bheduasol–Salboni sector in 1998–99.
