= Hijli =

- Neighbourhood
- Location in West Bengal, India Hijli (India)
- Coordinates: 22.319714°N 87.309964°E
- Country: India
- State: West Bengal
- District: Paschim Medinipur

Languages*
  - Official: Bengali, Santali, English
- Time zone: UTC+5:30 (IST)
- PIN: 721306
- Telephone/STD code: 03221
- Lok Sabha constituency: Medinipur
- Vidhan Sabha constituency: Kharagpur
- Website: paschimmedinipur.gov.in

Hijli is a neighborhood of Kharagpur in the Kharagpur subdivision of the Paschim Medinipur district in the state of West Bengal, India.

== History ==
Hijli has a history much larger than its present presence. Today it is just another neighborhood of Khargapur city with a satellite railway station. This area was part of Hijli Kingdom (1687–1886), which is a small kingdom stretched from Khejuri in the east to the Bahiri in the west. In 1728 today's Hijli became the capital of this kingdom. In 1930 during British Raj Hijli was chosen to build a jail for participating in armed struggles against the British. The same area of Hijli Detention Camp was replaced by India's very first Indian Institutes of Technology Campus in 1951.

== Geography ==
Cities and towns in the northern part of Kharagpur subdivision (including Khararagpur I & II, Debra and Pingla CD blocks) of Paschim Medinipur district
M: municipal city/ town, CT: census town, R: rural/ urban centre, H: historical/ religious centre, F: facilities
Owing to space constraints in the small map, the actual locations in a larger map may vary slightly

=== Location ===
Hijli is located at 22.319714°N 87.3309964°E.

=== Area overview ===
Kharagpur subdivision, shown partly in the map alongside, mostly has alluvial soils, except in two CD blocks in the west – Kharagpur I and Keshiary, which mostly have lateritic soils. Around 74% of the total cultivated area is cropped more than once. With a density of population of 787 per km^{2}nearly half of the district's population resides in this subdivision. 14.33% of the population lives in urban areas and 86.67% lives in the rural areas.

Note: The map alongside presents some of the notable locations in the subdivision. All places marked in the map are linked in the larger full screen map.

== Education ==
Indian Institute of Technology Kharagpur was the first Indian Institute of Technology in the country in 1950. It was located in what was earlier Hijli Detention Camp that had been used as a detention camp during the period of British colonial rule in India to imprison Indian independence activists.

Hijli College was established in 1995. Affiliated with the Vidyasagar University it offers honours courses in Bengali, English, Sanskrit, history, education, philosophy, sociology, BCA, chemistry, computer science, geography, mathematics, physics and general courses in arts and science.

.* For language details see Kharagpur I#Language and religion

== Healthcare ==
B.C.Roy Technology Hospital at IIT, Kharagpur, functions with 35 beds.

Hijli Rural Hospital, with 60 beds at Hijli, is the major government medical facility in the Kharagpur I CD block.

== See also ==
- Raja Haridas, the king of Hijli.
