= Kharagpur Junction railway station =

Railway station in West Bengal, India

Kharagpur Junction খড়গপুর জংশন
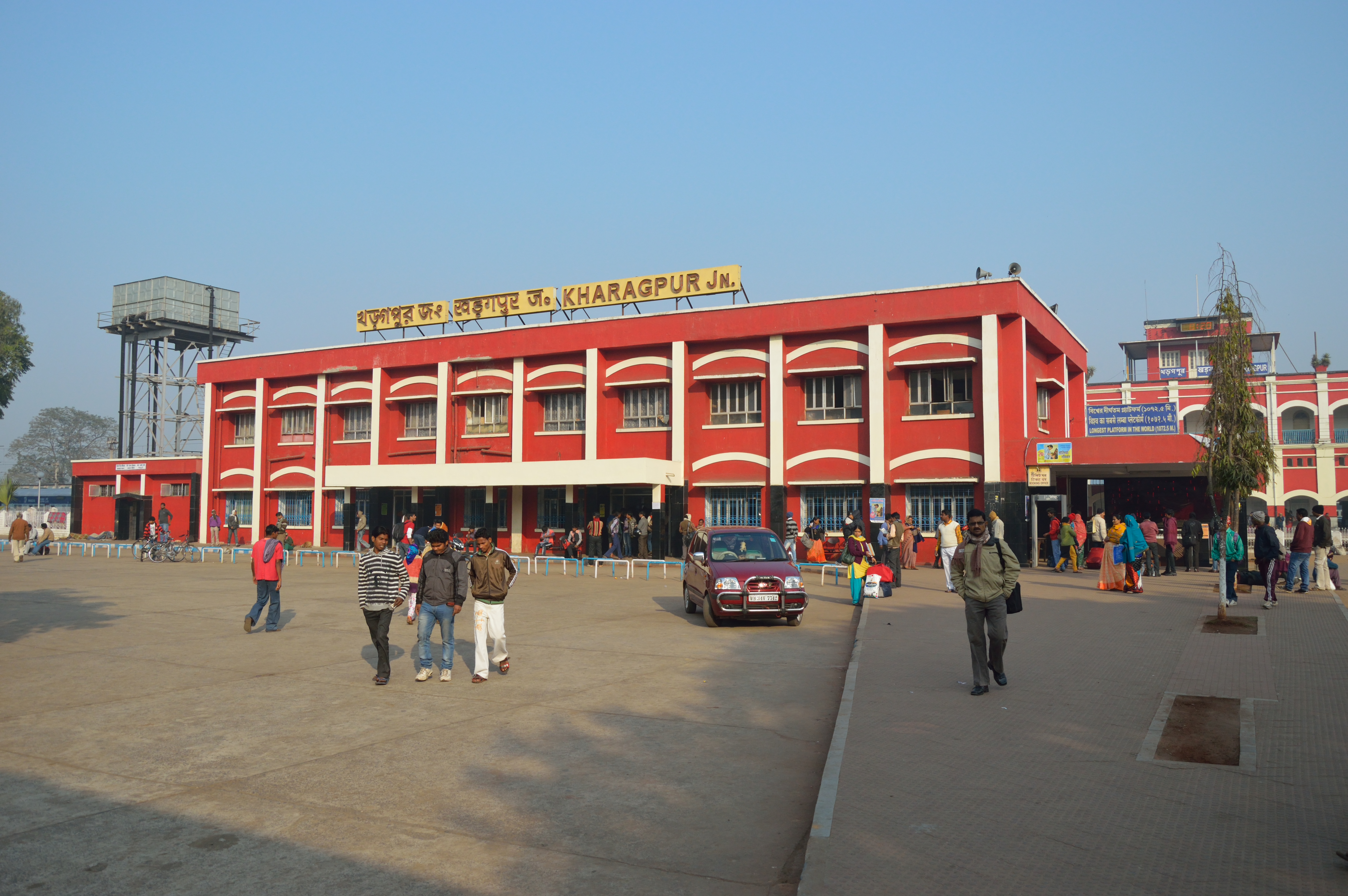
- Entrance of view Kharagpur Junction railway station

General information
- Location: Kharagpur, West Bengal; India
- Coordinates: 22.339914°N 87.325016°E
- Elevation: 29 m (95 ft)
- System: Indian Railways; Kolkata Suburban Railway
- Owner: Indian Railways
- Operator: South Eastern Railway
- Lines: Howrah-Kharagpur line, Howrah–Nagpur–Mumbai line, Howrah–Chennai main line, Kharagpur–Bankura–Adra line , Asansol–Tatanagar–Kharagpur line, Kolkata Suburban Railway
- Platforms: 12 (1,1A,2,2A,3,3A,4,4A,5,6,7,8); Total length: 1,072 m (3,517 ft)
- Tracks: 24
- Connections: Auto stand, Bus stand

Construction
- Structure type: At grade
- Parking: Car parking Available
- Accessible: Available
- Architectural style: British

Other information
- Status: Functioning
- Station code: KGP
- Zone(s): South Eastern Railway
- Division(s): Kharagpur

History
- Opened: 1898–1899; 127 years ago
- Former names: Bengal Nagpur Railway

Passengers
- More than 5,00,000 daily

Services
Preceding station	Indian Railways	Following station
Jakpur towards Howrah Junction	South Eastern Railway zone Howrah–Chennai main line	Hijli towards Chennai Central
Jakpur towards Howrah Junction	South Eastern Railway zone Howrah–Nagpur–Mumbai line	Nimpura towards Chhatrapati Shivaji Terminus
Preceding station	Kolkata Suburban Railway	Following station
Girimaidan towards Midnapore	South Eastern Line Main line & Kharagpur–Bankura–Adra line	Jakpur towards Howrah Junction
Route map
Location
- Location within India Location within West Bengal
- Interactive map of Kharagpur Junction

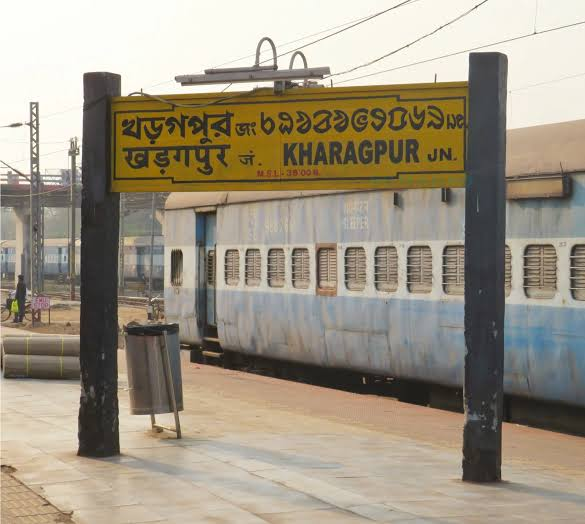
Kharagpur Junction railway station

Kharagpur Junction railway station (KGP) is a railway station in Kharagpur of Paschim Medinipur district in the Indian state of West Bengal. It is also the fourth longest railway station by platform length after Hubli Junction railway station, Gorakhpur Junction railway station and Kollam Junction railway station. It is an A-1 category station of Indian Railways.

== History ==
Kharagpur Junction came up in 1898–99. On one side, Bengal Nagpur Railway's Kharagpur–Cuttack line was opened on New Year's Day in 1899. On the other hand, the opening of the bridge over the Rupnarayan River at Kolaghat, on 19 April 1900, connected Howrah with Kharagpur. Kharagpur was also linked with Sini the same year. The line was ready in 1898–99. The Kharagpur–Midnapore branch line was opened to traffic in 1901.

== Platform length, modernization, and unique features ==
After Hubballi Junction, Gorakhpur, and Kollam Junction in Kerala, Kharagpur has the world's fourth-longest railway platform with a length of 1,072.5 metres (3,519 ft). Remodelling of Gorakhpur railway station was completed and the new platform inaugurated on 6 October 2013. Till then Kharagpur held the distinction of having the longest platform in the world for many years. Kharagpur also has the Asia's largest Railway Solid State Interlocking (SSI) system.

Platform nos. 1 and 3, and 2 and 4 of Kharagpur Junction are continuous. The 24-coach Coromandel Express stops at the start of platform no. 3 and its tail extends some distance into platform no. 1. Aloo Khasa is one of the famous dish found at the Kharagpur railway platform.

== Background ==
It is the busiest junction station in South Eastern Railway Zone after Howrah. Hence, it is termed as Gateway to South Eastern Railway. It is one of the fifty highest railway reservation in India. It is a junction which connects Howrah to Mumbai, Chennai, Adra/Purulia and New Delhi via Tatanagar as well. It also connects Bhubaneshwar to New Delhi. Everyday approximately 275 trains pass through this station which includes freight traffic. In terms of passenger traffic it handles 176 trains on a daily basis. So, in a bid to decongest Kharagpur station and speed up locomotives, South Eastern Railway has decided to develop Hijli (close to IIT Kharagpur) as an alternative station for Kharagpur. Now most of the new trains coming from Balasore side and going towards Adra or Tatanagar stop at Hijli and bypass Kharagpur. In order to increase passenger commute between Kharagpur and Hijli, new EMU services have been introduced between these two stations.

The Howrah–Nagpur–Mumbai line is classified under Route A of Indian Railways which allows trains to run at maximum permissible speed of 160 km/h. However, as a result of the automated block section between Howrah and Kharagpur, the speed is restricted to 130 km/h. The Howrah–Kharagpur section has been identified as one of the high-density automatic block signaling routes on Indian Railways. Thus plans are to deploy Train Protection & Warning System (TPWS) on this section to mitigate the risk of signal passed at danger (SPAD) by loco pilots leading to accidents.

== Diesel Loco Shed, Kharagpur ==
Despite being named as a Diesel Loco Shed, it only holds electric locomotives.

Serial No.	Locomotive Class	Horsepower	Holding
1.	WAG-7	5350	226
Total Locomotives Active as of July 2025			226

The station also hosts an Electric Loco Trip Shed towards Howrah direction of the station.

== Gallery ==
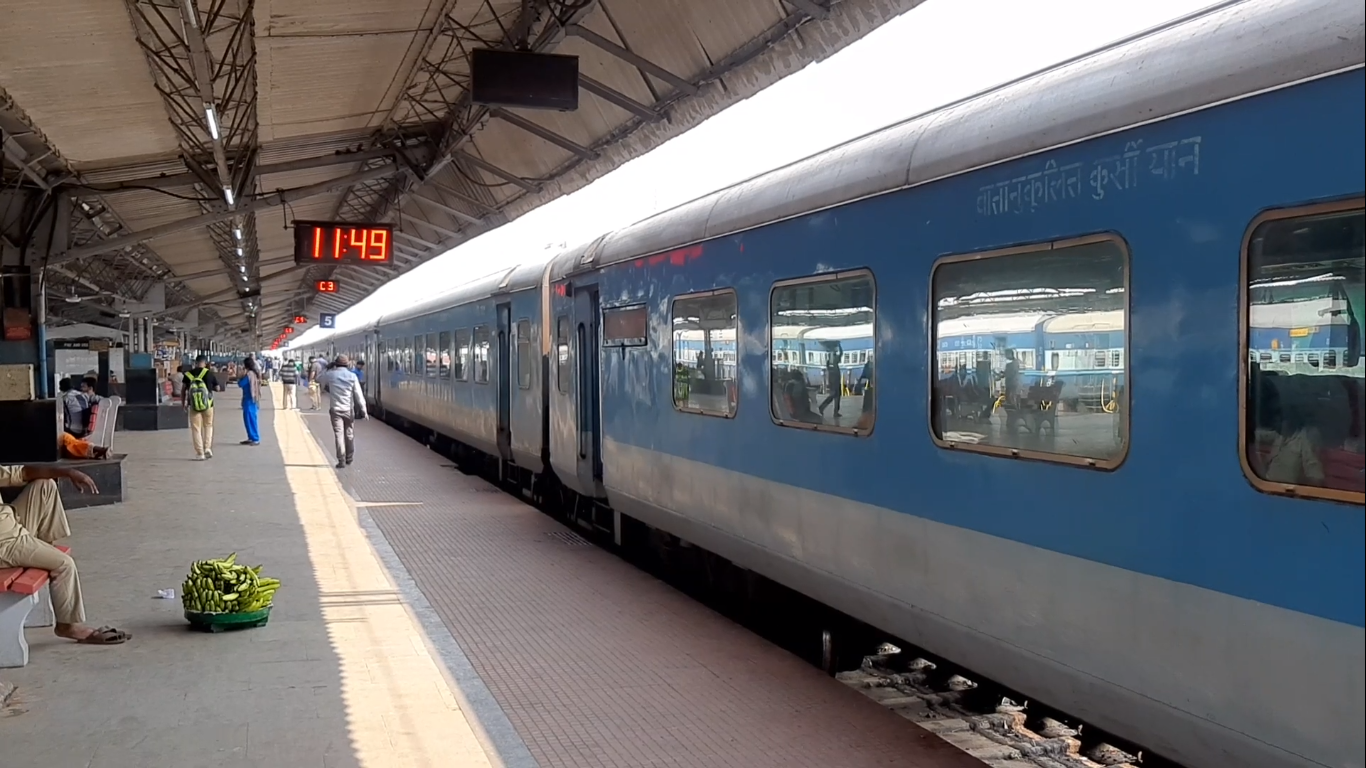
The Howrah–Puri Shatabdi Express at Kharagpur

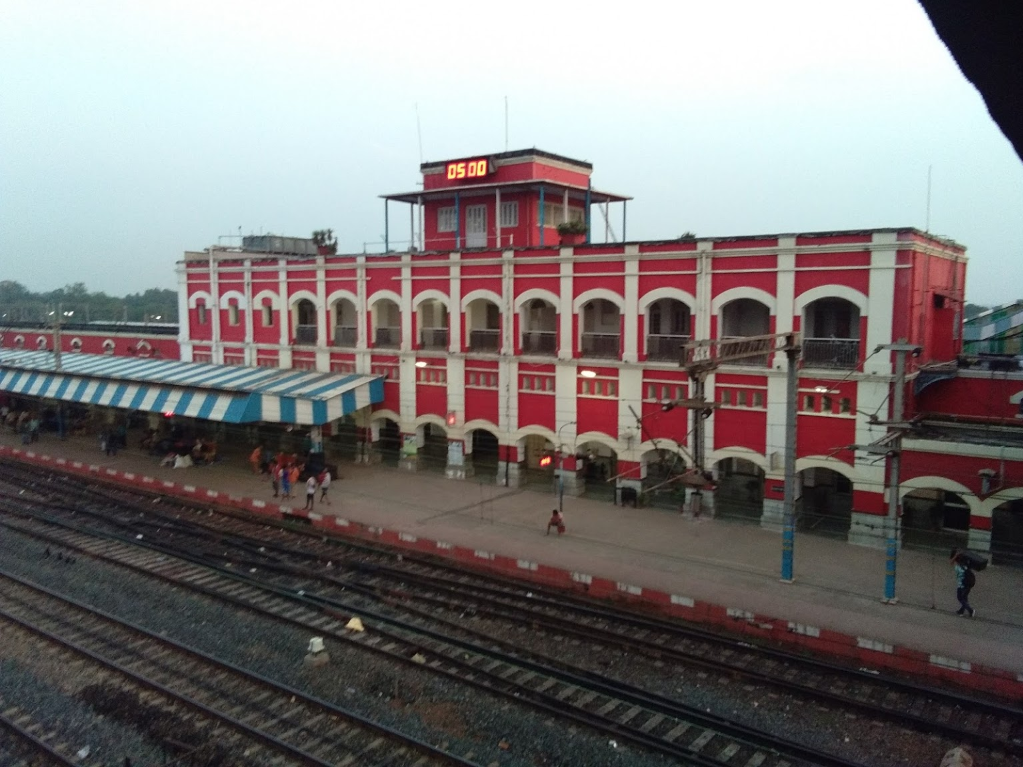
An aerial view of the station

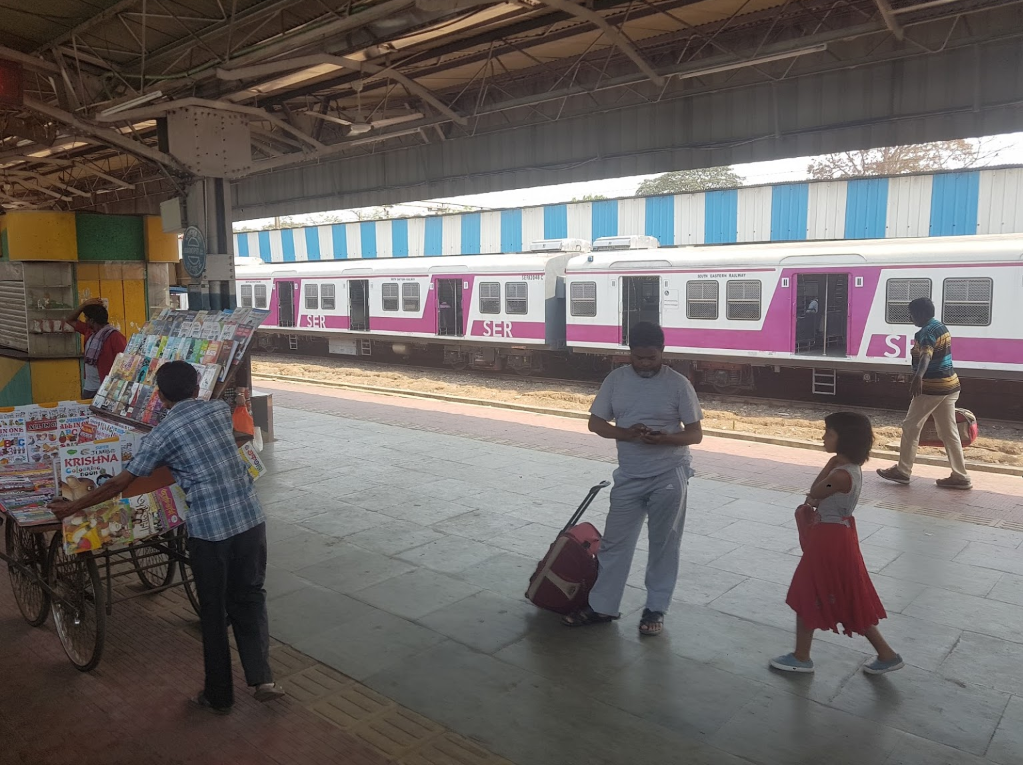
An EMU at Kharagpur

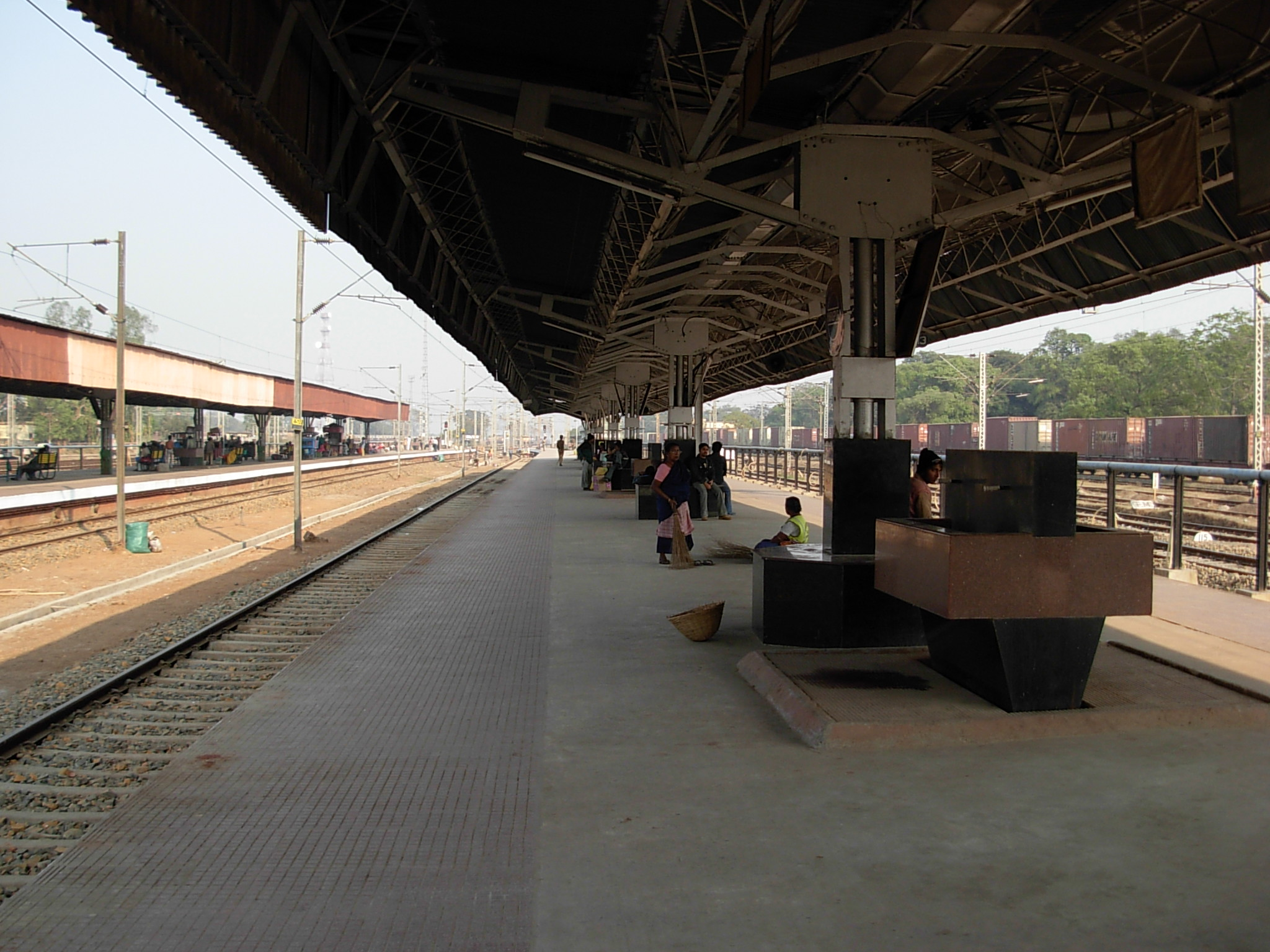
The station

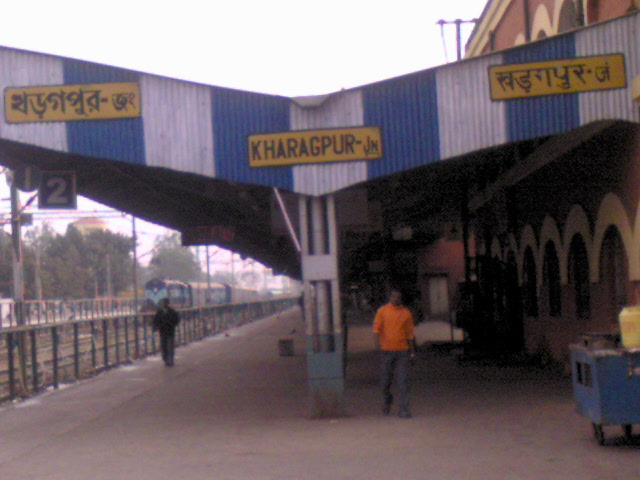
The station

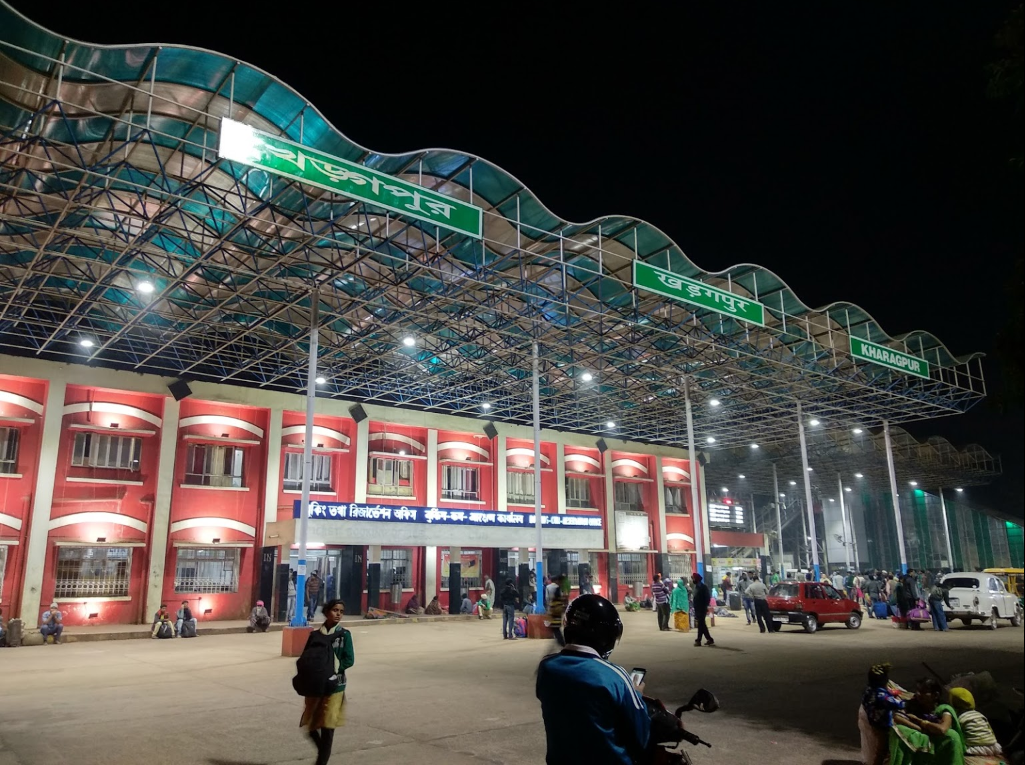
Entrance and ticket booking office at night

Coromandel Express halted at Kharagpur Junction

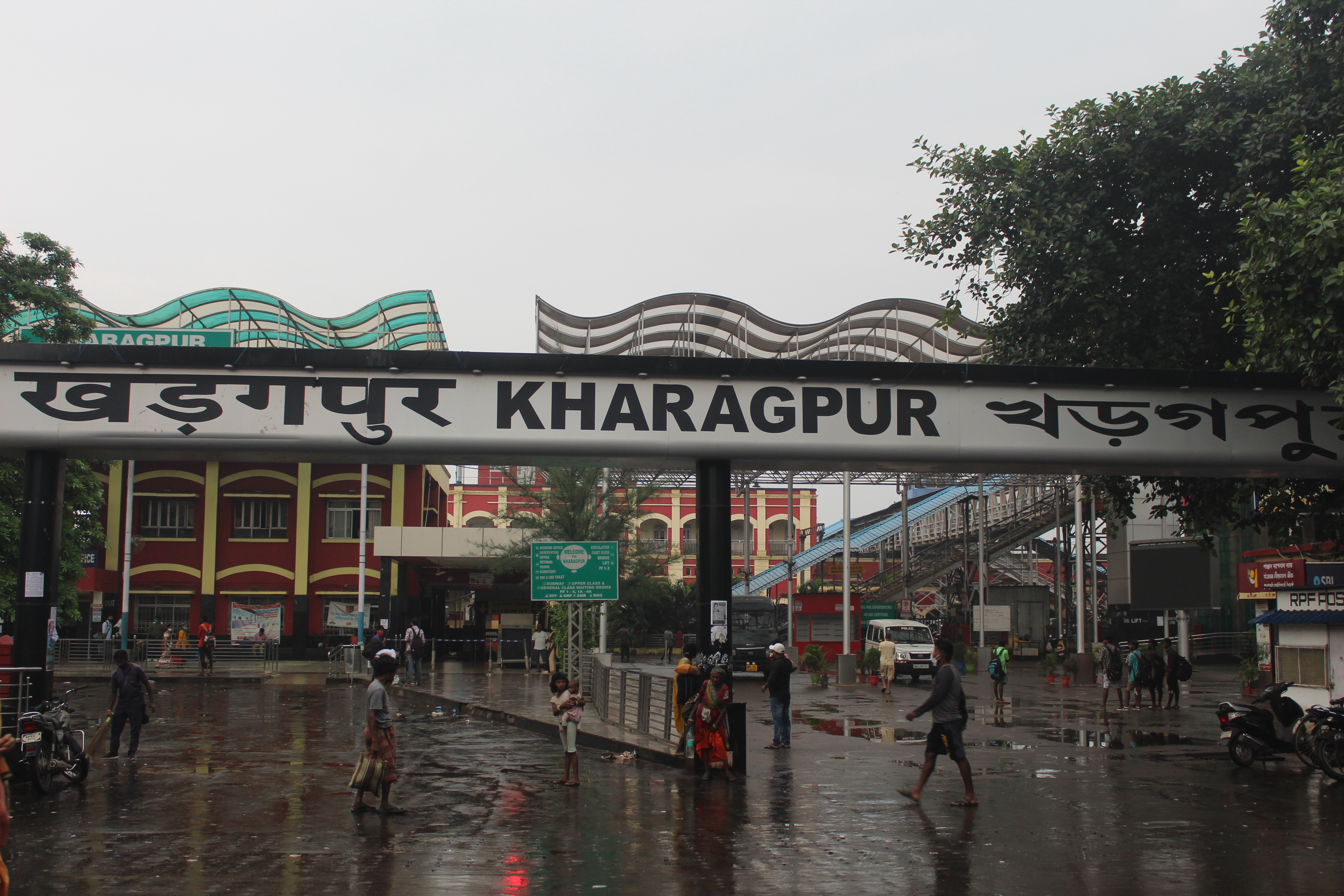
Railway station entrance (Bogda/South side)
