= Taj Khan =

- Born: Taj Khan c. 1820
- Died: c. 1904
- Occupation: Dhrupad singer

Taj Khan (c. 1820 – c. 1904) was an Indian and Nepali Hindustani Classical musician trained in the Kalpi tradition of Dhrupad. He is known for being the foremost luminary of Dhrupad and Dhamar in the Nepal Court during the 19th and 20th Centuries. Khan was also a court musician of Wajid Ali Shah in Awadh and Metiabruz.

== Background ==
Some historians claim Taj Khan was a descendant of Miyan Tansen.

Khan served alongside Aliya-Fatu in the Nepal Court.

Khan trained his son, Raza, and grandsons, Ahmed Hussain and Amanat Hussain in music. His daughter married sarod maestro Kaukab Khan.
