= Dr B C Roy Institute of Medical Sciences & Research =

Medical research institute and hospital in West Bengal, India

Dr. B. C. Roy Institute of Medical Sciences & Research
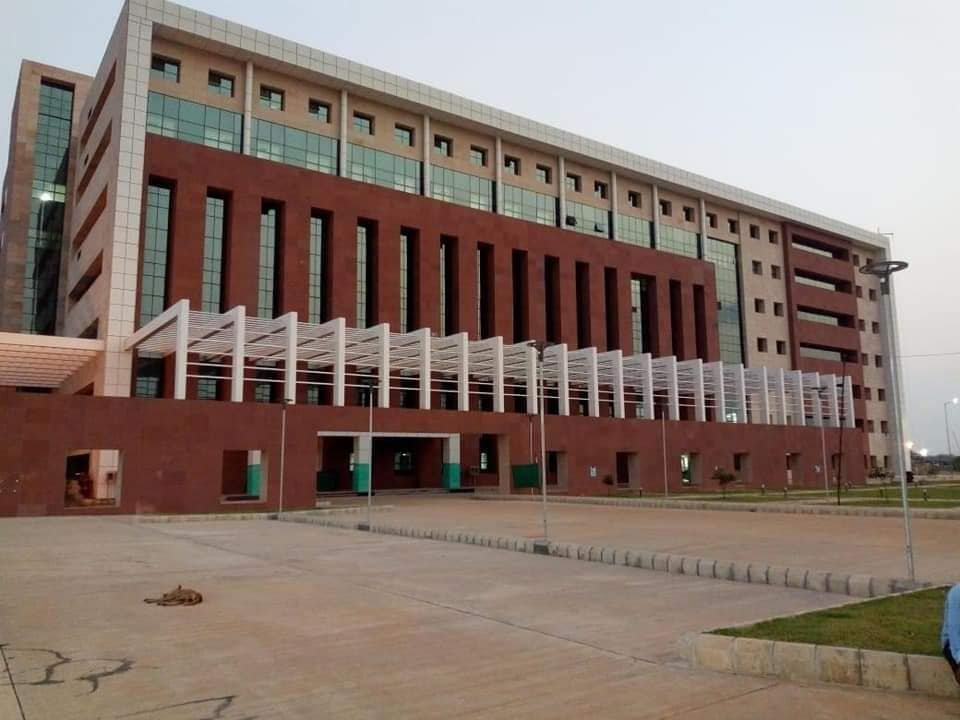
- Other name: Dr. Syama Prasad Mookerjee Super Speciality Hospital
- Type: Public Medical College and Hospital
- Established: 2018; 8 years ago
- Parent institution: IIT Kharagpur
- Principal: Prof. Soumen Das
- Location: Balarampur, IIT Kharagpur; Paschim Medinipur, West Bengal, 721306, India; 22°18′36″N 87°19′40″E
- Campus: Urban 18 acres (0.073 km^{2})
- Website: www.iitkgp.ac.in/department/SH

Dr. B. C. Roy Institute of Medical Sciences & Research (also the hospital which a part of the institution is known as Dr. Syama Prasad Mookerjee Super Speciality Hospital) is a medical school and research institute at Balarampur, outside IIT Kharagpur campus, Paschim Medinipur district, West Bengal, India. It will start with a 400-bed multi-speciality hospital with specialities like Cardiac, Neurosurgery, Organ Transplantation, Oncology, Trauma and others. Beside this, it will be equipped with state-of-the art research facilities like Telemedicine, Tissue engineering, Bioelectronics etc. and expand to 750 bed capacity later. It is proposed to start with 50 undergraduate medical seats. The institute is supposed to be functional by end of 2018. The various research, academic and medical infrastructure planning is being jointly carried out by IIT Kharagpur and All India Institute of Medical Sciences, Delhi.

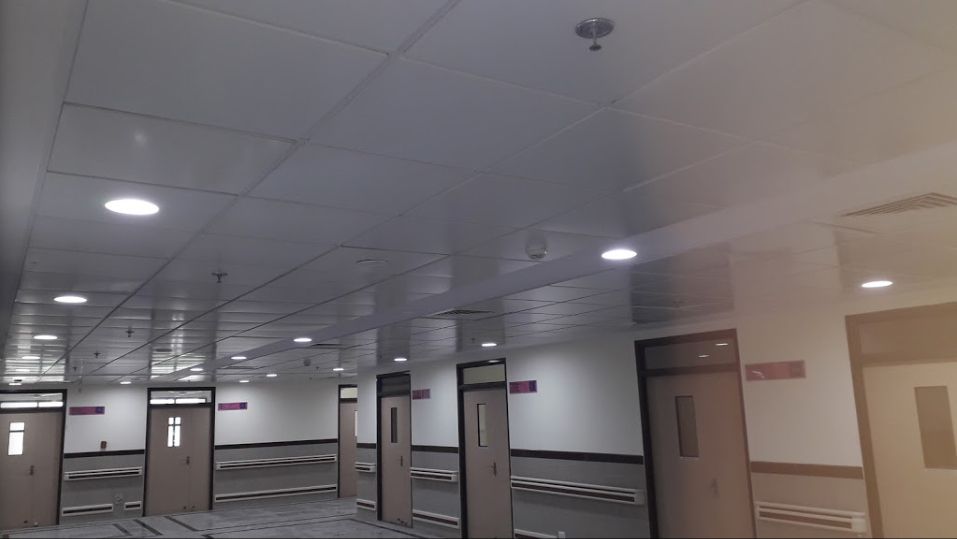
Inside the medical college & hospital

As per IIT Kharagpur, in the phase – I, the 400-Bed Super-Speciality hospital will be begin its journey by end of 2019. The graduate and postgraduate medical courses are expected to start in the academic year 2021–22.

As per the institute, 10% of the beds would be free and 65% of the beds would be charged as per the rates in the central and state health insurance schemes. Plans are also in place to expand and include a nursing college and a school to train paramedical and technical experts.

During the COVID-19 lockdown in India, unoccupied hospital building served as the quarantine center for the inter-state travelers returning to West Bengal.

On 71st foundation day of IIT Kharagpur, Amit Khare, the Secretary, Ministry of Education in Government of India, declared that the medical courses will start from November 2021.

As of 2022, the hospital has 160 general beds, 90 ICU beds and 10 child crib carriers, out of which 44 ICU beds were donated by Arjun Malhotra.

The institute currently offers only MD courses for students.

== See also ==
- List of institutions of higher education in West Bengal
- School of Medical Science and Technology IIT Kharagpur
