= Bahiri =

- Census Town
- Location in West Bengal, India Bahiri (India)
- Coordinates: 22.40197°N 86.88374°E
- Country: India
- State: West Bengal
- District: Purba Medinipur

Population (2011)
  - Total: 8,288

Languages
  - Official: Bengali, English
- Time zone: UTC+5:30 (IST)
- PIN: 721427
- Vehicle registration: WB
- Lok Sabha constituency: Contai
- Vidhan Sabha constituency: Panskura Paschim
- Website: purbamedinipur.gov.in

Bahiri is a census town in Tamluk subdivision of Purba Medinipur district in the Indian state of West Bengal.

It once served as capital city of Hijli Kingdom

== Demographics ==
As of 2001 India census, Bahirgram had a population of 8288. Males constitute 51% of the population and females 49%. Bahirgram has an average literacy rate of 63%, higher than the national average of 59.5%; with 56% of the males and 44% of females literate. 14% of the population is under 6 years of age.
