= Kharagpur Railway Settlement =

- Census Town
- Location in West Bengal, India Kharagpur Railway Settlement (India)
- Coordinates: 22.35329°N 87.33976°E
- Country: India
- State: West Bengal
- District: Paschim Medinipur

Area
  - Total: 32.37 km^{2} (12.50 sq mi)

Population (2011)
  - Total: 82,735
  - Density: 2,556/km^{2} (6,620/sq mi)

Languages*
  - Official: Bengali, Santali, English
- Time zone: UTC+5:30 (IST)
- ISO 3166 code: IN-WB
- Vehicle registration: WB
- Lok Sabha constituency: Medinipur
- Vidhan Sabha constituency: Kharagpur Sadar
- Website: paschimmedinipur.gov.in

Kharagpur Railway Settlement is a census town in the Kharagpur I CD block in the Kharagpur subdivision of the Paschim Medinipur district in the Indian state of West Bengal.

== Geography ==
Cities and towns in the northern part of Kharagpur subdivision (including Khararagpur I & II, Debra and Pingla CD blocks) of Paschim Medinipur district
M: municipal city/ town, CT: census town, R: rural/ urban centre, H: historical/ religious centre, F: facilities
Owing to space constraints in the small map, the actual locations in a larger map may vary slightly

=== Location ===
Kharagpur Railway Settlement is located at 22.35329°N 87.33976°E.

=== Area overview ===
Kharagpur subdivision, shown partly in the map alongside, mostly has alluvial soils, except in two CD blocks in the west – Kharagpur I and Keshiary, which mostly have lateritic soils. Around 74% of the total cultivated area is cropped more than once. With a density of population of 787 per km^{2} nearly half of the district’s population resides in this subdivision. 14.33% of the population lives in urban areas and 86.67% in the rural areas.

Note: The map alongside presents some of the notable locations in the subdivision. All places marked in the map are linked in the larger full screen map.

== Demographics ==
As per 2011 Census of India, Kharagpur Railway Settlement had a population of 82,735 of which 41,388 (50%) were males and 41,347 (50%) were females. Population below 6 years was 7,257. The total number of literates in Kharagpur Railway Settlement was 61,571 (74.42% of the population over 6 years).

As of 2001 India census, Kharagpur Railway Settlement had a population of 88,339. Males constitute 51% of the population and females 49%. Kharagpur Railway Settlement has an average literacy rate of 78%, higher than the national average of 59.5%: male literacy is 85%, and female literacy is 71%. In Kharagpur Railway Settlement, 9% of the population is under 6 years of age.

.* For language details see Kharagpur I#Language and religion

== Infrastructure ==
According to the District Census Handbook 2011, Paschim Medinipur, Kharagpur Railway Settlement covered an area of 32.37 km^{2}. Among the civic amenities, it had 64 km roads with both open and closed drains, the protected water supply involved overhead tank, borewell, tubewell. It had 1,600 domestic electric connections, 4,800 road lighting points. Among the educational facilities it had were 3 primary schools, 3 middle schools, 3 secondary schools, 3 senior secondary schools. Among the social, cultural and recreational facilities, it had 1 stadium, 4 cinema theatre, 9 auditorium/ community halls, 5 reading rooms.
