= Rasulpur River =

River in West Bengal, India

Coordinates: 21°47′N 87°54′E

Location
- Country: India
- State: West Bengal

Physical characteristics
- Length: 19 km (12 mi)
- Discharge
  - location: Hooghly

The Rasulpur River (also spelt Rasalpur) is a tributary of the Hooghly River. The Rasulpur flows through Paschim Medinipur and Purba Medinipur districts. It flows as the Bagda River until Kalinagar and then as the Rasulpur River. Its tributaries are Itaberia Khal, Mugberia Khal, Palabani Khal, Padurbheri Khal and Alipur Khal. It joins the Bay of Bengal shortly after Petua Ghat, a Fishing Harbor just before the river's estuary, opposite Sagar Island.
