= Kharagpur =

City in West Bengal, India

- City
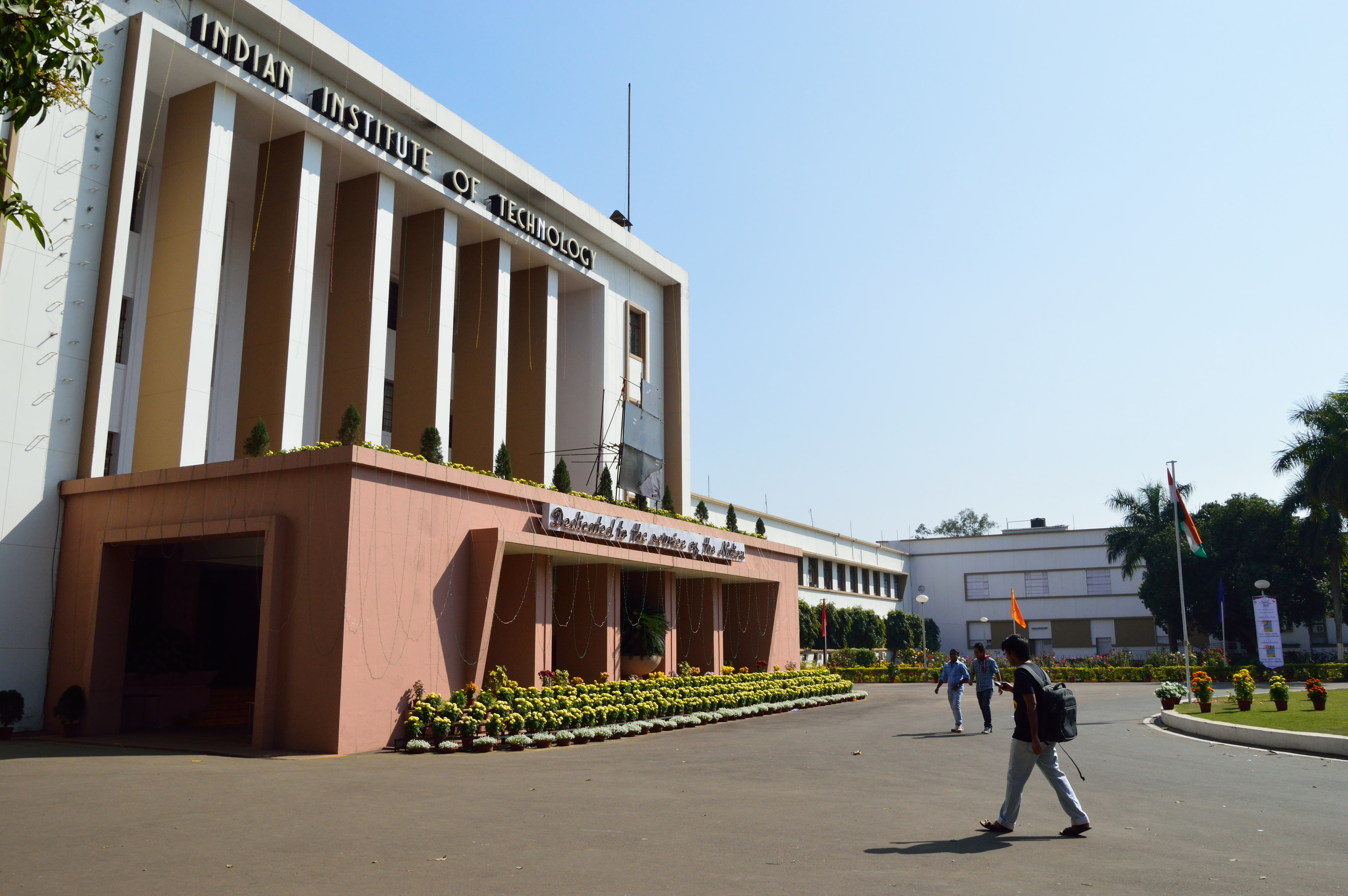
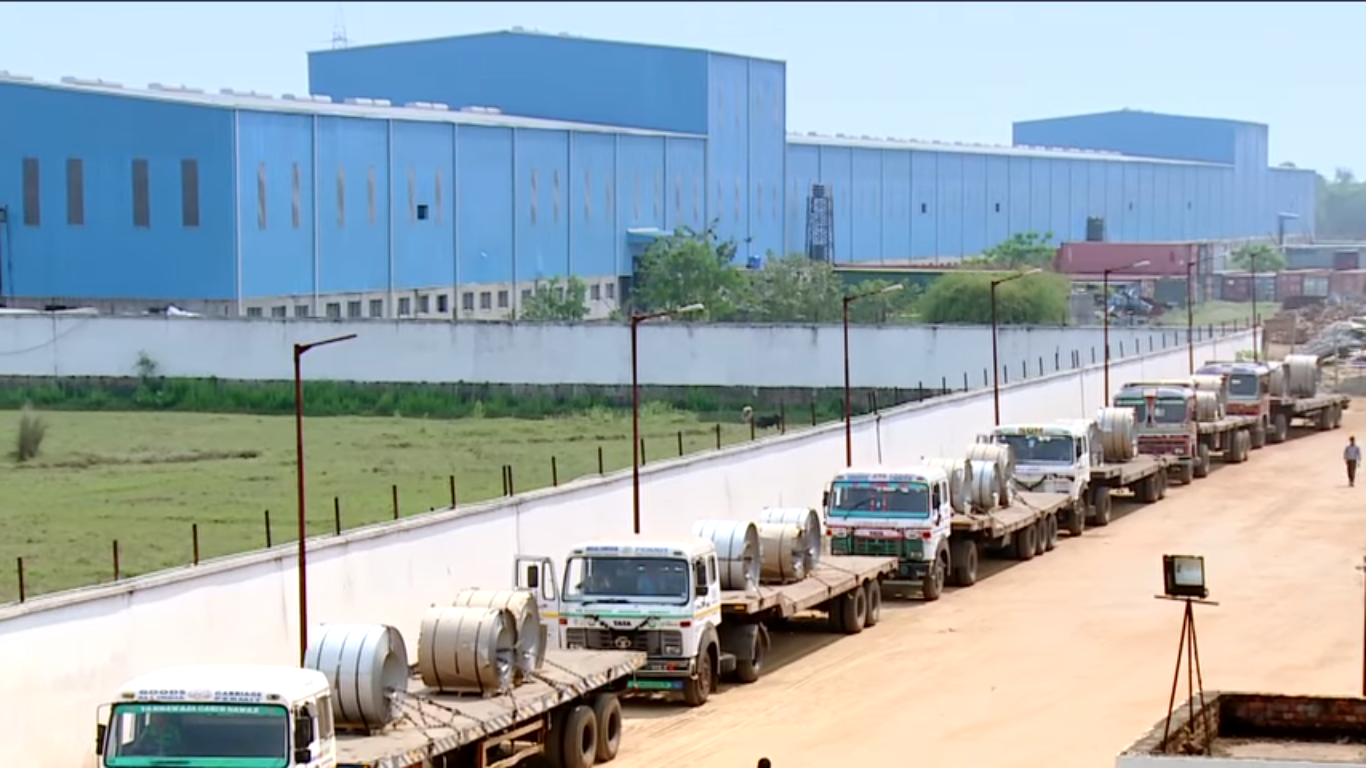
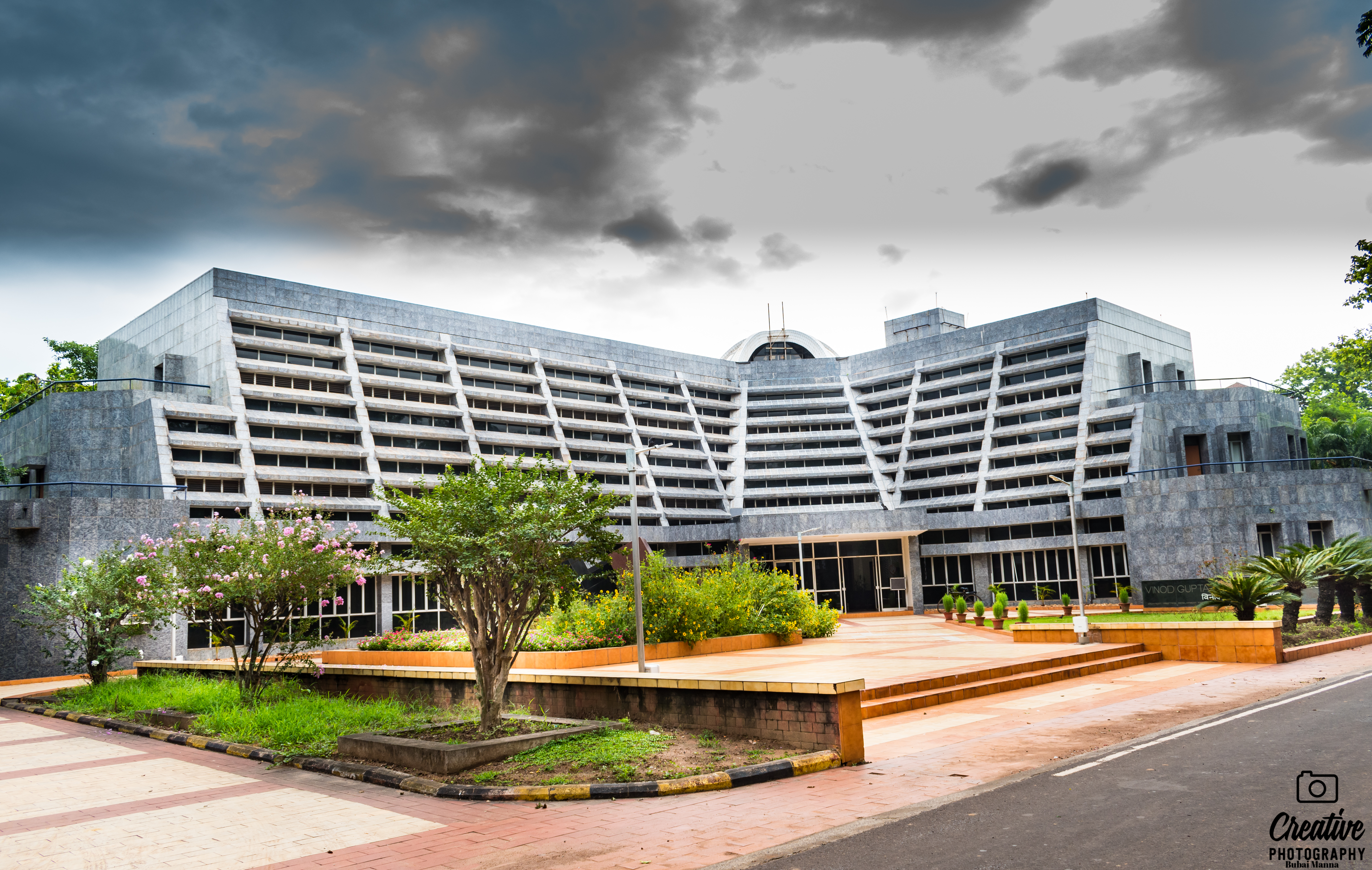
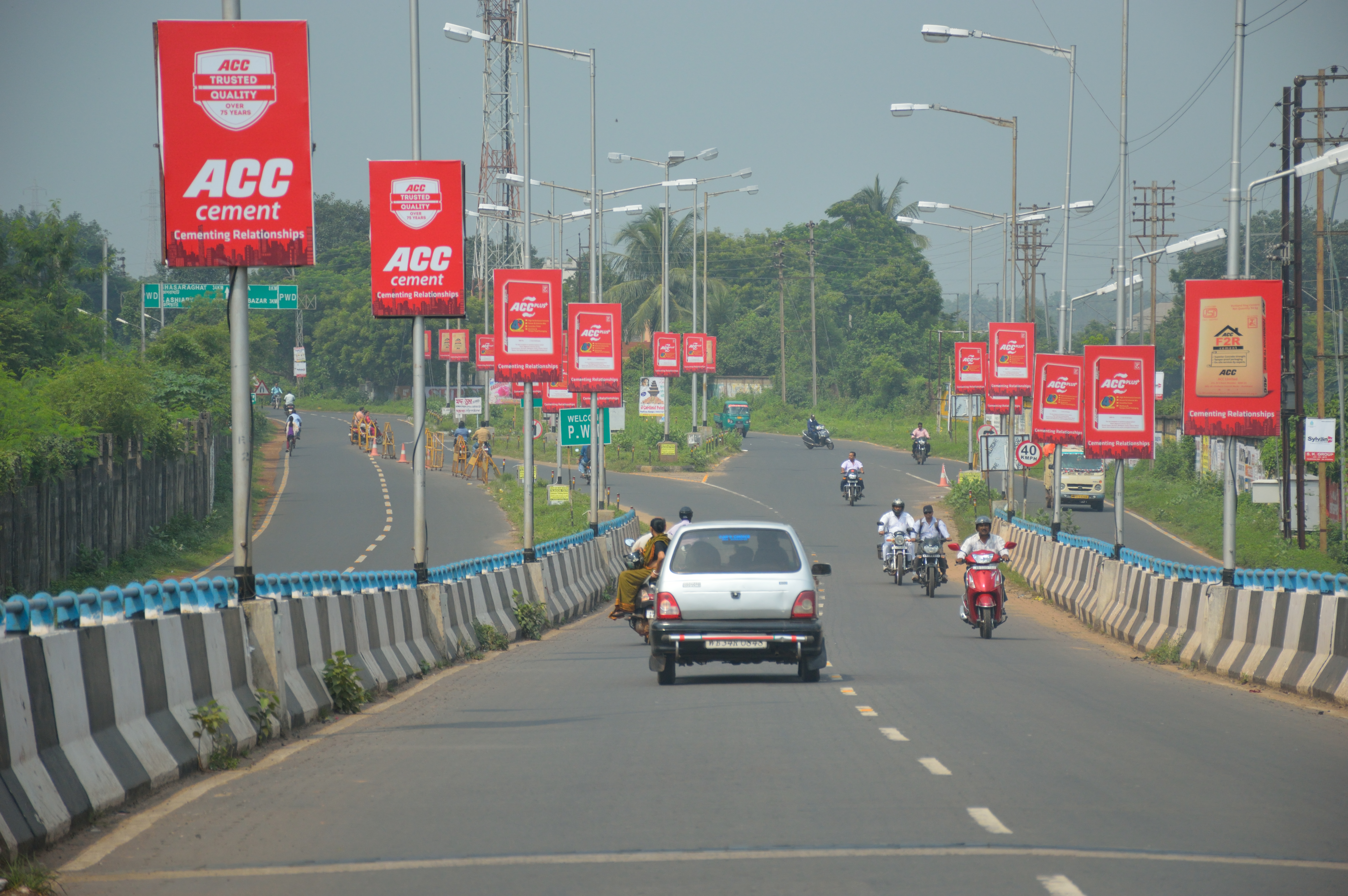
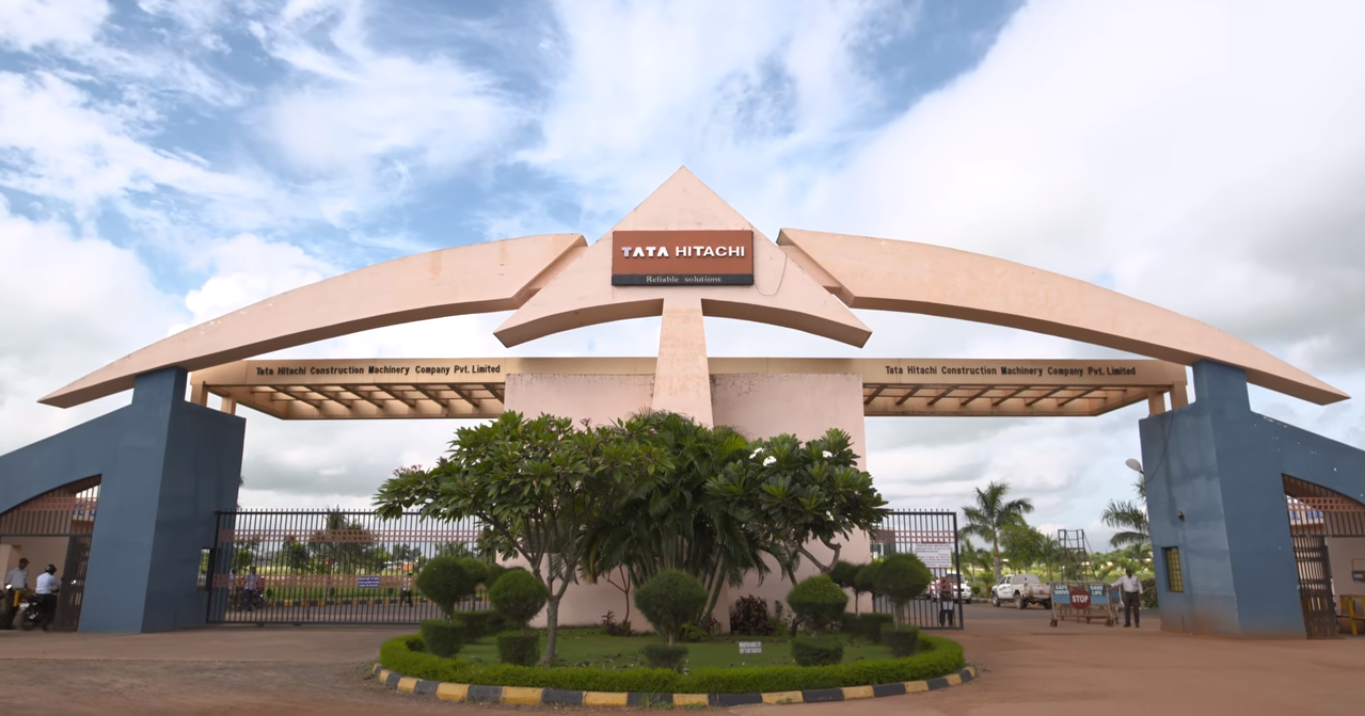
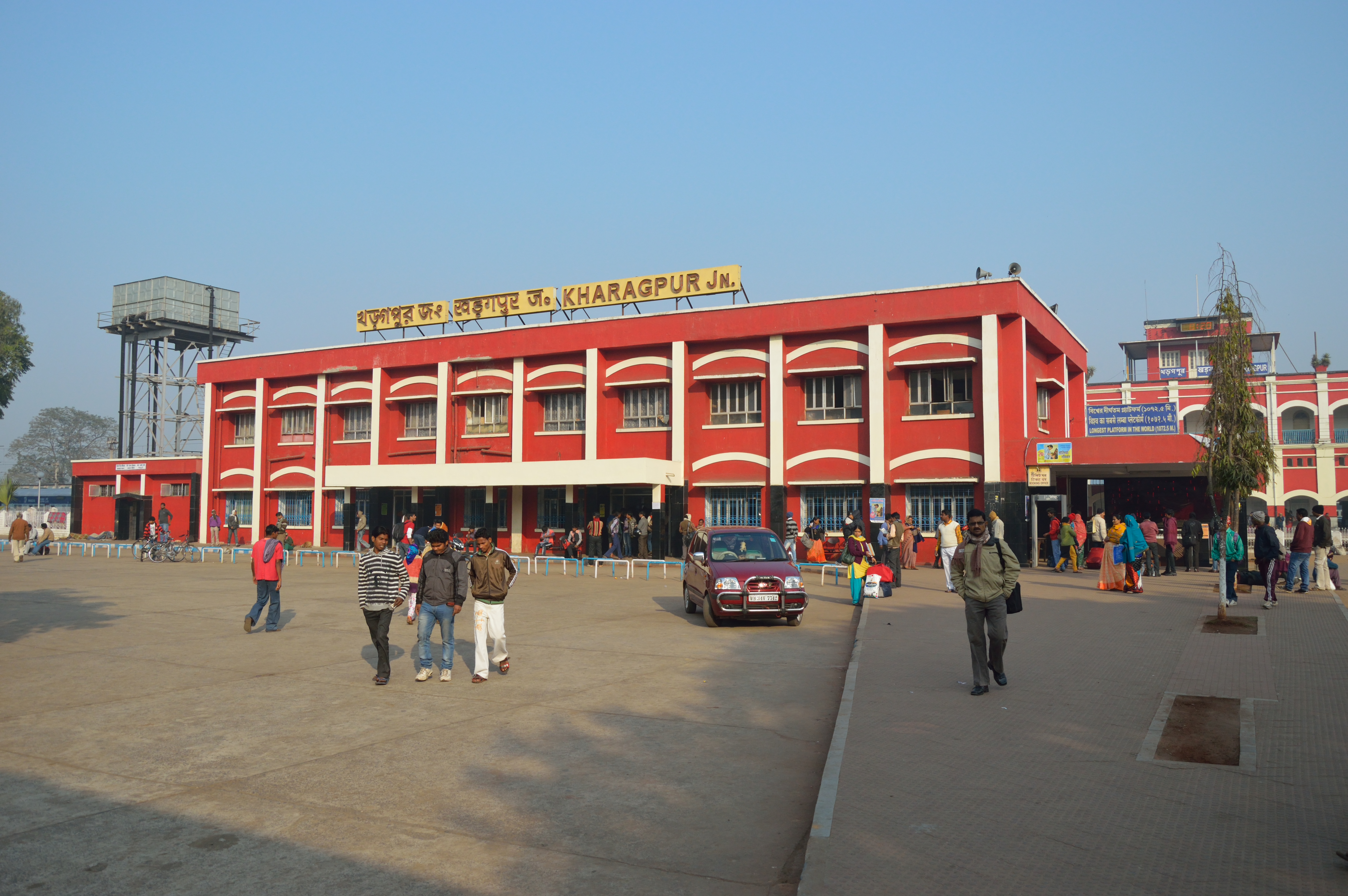
- IIT Kharagpur Inside Vidyasagar Industrial Park at Kharagpur Vinod Gupta School of Management Railway overbridge, Keshiary Road Tata Hitachi, Kharagpur Kharagpur Junction railway station, fourth longest platform in the world, divisional headquarters of South-eastern zone of Indian Railways

- Location in West Bengal Location in India
- Coordinates: 22.330239°N 87.323653°E
- Country: India
- State: West Bengal
- Division: Medinipur
- Subdivision: Kharagpur
- District: Paschim Medinipur
- Named for: Kharga Malla

Government
  - Type: Municipality
  - Body: Kharagpur Municipality; Midnapore Kharagpur Development Authority
  - MLA: Dilip Ghosh (BJP)
  - Chairman: Kalyani Ghosh (TMC)
  - MP: June Malia (TMC)
  - District Magistrate: Khursheed Ali Qadri, IAS

Area
  - Total: 127 km^{2} (49 sq mi)
- Elevation: 61 m (200 ft)

Population (2011)
  - Total: 299,683
  - Rank: 5th in West Bengal; 221st in India
  - Density: 2,360/km^{2} (6,110/sq mi)

Languages
  - Official: Bengali, English
- Time zone: UTC+5:30 (IST)
- PIN: 721301 - 721305
- Telephone code: 03222
- ISO 3166 code: IN-WB
- Vehicle registration: WB-36-xxxx
- Lok Sabha constituency: Medinipur
- Vidhan Sabha constituency: Kharagpur Sadar
- Website: kharagpurmunicipality.org

Kharagpur (Bengali: [kʰɔɽɔɡɔpuɾ]) is a semi-planned urban agglomeration and a major industrial city in the Paschim Medinipur district of West Bengal, India. It is the headquarters of the Kharagpur subdivision and the largest city of the district. It is located 116 kilometres (72 mi) west of Kolkata. Kharagpur is home to IIT Kharagpur, the oldest and largest Indian Institute of Technology. The Kharagpur Junction railway station is the headquarters of the Kharagpur Division of the South Eastern Railways.

Founded by Kharga Malla of the Mallabhum Dynasty in 832 AD, Kharagpur was integrated into Hijli Kingdom and ruled by the Mallabhum Odia kings. During the reign of Mughal Empire's Shaista Khan in 1687, Kharagpur developed into a port town. In February 1687, Job Charnock of the East India Company (EIC) with his English forces captured Hijli from the Mughals and later that year, the town was recaptured from the EIC with an ambush siege laid by Abdus Samad, a lieutenant serving under Shaista Khan. Bengal Subah's loss at the Battle of Plassey in 1757 placed the Subah under the EIC. Hijli, the only constituent of Kharagpur, as a province existed until 1886, covering parts of both Bengal and Odisha. In 1930, during the Indian independence movement, Hijli detention camp was opened by the British Raj to detain political prisoners. The "Hijli firing" on 16 September 1931 in which two prisoners died in the camp caused large-scale protests, including a condemnation by Subhash Chandra Bose and Rabindranath Tagore. In 1944, Kharagpur also served as a key airfield for Pacific War in the World War II. Post India's 1947 partition, Kharagpur had rehabilitated migrant East Bengali refugees who fled from riots and unemployment crisis in the then-East Pakistan (now Bangladesh). In the 1990s, many farmers in the city were left landless after the government of West Bengal carried out land acquisition without paying them adequate compensation.

While the Kharagpur subdivision covers an area of 2,913.17 square kilometres (1,124.78 sq mi), the Kharagpur proper covers an area of about 127 square kilometres (49 sq mi). As of 2024, different private companies are operating in the city which contribute to its economic growth. Some of them are Tata Group's subsidiaries, Godrej, Indian Oil, and Aditya Birla Group. As of 2025, the Kharagpur Junction railway station has the fourth longest railway platform in the world, with a length of 1,072 m (0.666 miles), after Hubbali, Gorakhpur, and Kollam junctions.

== History ==
Kharagpur (transliterated from Khargapur) received its name from the twelfth king of the Mallabhum dynasty, Kharga Malla, when he conquered the area in 832 AD (Bengali: 147 BS). It became a part of the Hijli Kingdom, and it was ruled by Hindu Odia rulers of the Mallabhum dynasty.

According to a research study in 2022, in the 16th century, Kharagpur was a small village which was surrounded by dense forests. The village was located on a high rocky barren terrain. According to the Ain-i-Akbari, a detailed document spanning the Mughal emperor Akbar's reign, it also had a well-guarded fort in the middle of its wooded hills.

Hijli Kingdom, centred in Kharagpur, developed into a port town in 1687, when it consisted of Hijli alone. On 9 February 1687, Job Charnock, with English soldiers and warships, captured Hijli on the east coast of the Medinipur district and thereby defeated the Mughals ruling there. In mid-May 1687, Abdus Samad, a lieutenant serving under Shaista Khan, arrived to recapture Hijli from the English forces, with 12,000 men. The Mughal forces' heavy batteries, then located on the mainland west of Hijli, fired across the English positions, which drove the latter's ships from their anchorage. On 28 May an army of 700 cavalry and 200 gunners recaptured Hijli from the English, and set it ablaze. Malaria had spread to the English forces killing more than 200 soldiers; only 100 men, including five officers, survived. Following these events, a peace treaty was signed between the English and Samad. Subsequently, the English left Hijli on 11 June 1687. On 9 November 1688, they also left Calcutta, back when it only constituted of three villages, and evacuated all their businesses and troops stationed in Bengal. The British came back to Bengal in 1690, and formally established the city of Calcutta, after an invitation by the new Viceroy of Bengal, Ibrahim Khan. After the Battle of Plassey, a significant battle between the then Nawab of Bengal, Siraj-ud-Daulah, and the East India Company (EIC), the EIC took control of the Bengal Presidency including Kharagpur, as its puppet state.

Hijli port was destroyed by the Calcutta cyclone of October 1864. The area was then rebuilt in the months following the natural calamity.

Hijli existed as a province until 1886, covering parts of both Bengal and Odisha. The province had important towns such as Tamluk, Panskura, and Debra. At the time, Hijli was ruled by Taj Khan. Many centuries before Khan, it was also ruled by the Kushan, Gupta, Pal, and the Mughal dynasties. In 2022, one research study claimed that Hijli had excellent business and trade centres, along with judiciary, prison, and administrative offices.

The entire Kharagpur division of today has identical boundaries to the 17th-century Hijli province.

=== Hijli detention camp ===
In 1930, the Hijli Detention Camp was opened by British authorities to house unarmed political prisoners, including revolutionaries from organisations such as Anushilan Samiti and Jugantar. The "Hijli firing" took place on 16 September 1931, in which two prisoners, Santosh Kumar Mitra and Tarakeswar Sengupta, were shot dead inside the camp. The incident also injured multiple others. It led to widespread protests in Bengal, including a condemnation by Subhas Chandra Bose and Rabindranath Tagore. Bose went in person to collect the two prisoners' dead bodies while there was an ongoing protest against the incident in Calcutta.

The camp was closed in 1937 and reopened in 1940 to detain political activists and freedom fighters who participated in anti-colonial movements. It closed in 1942 when the British needed to reorganise their administration for war efforts during World War II. After India's independence, the detention camp was converted to the Hijli Shaheed Bhavan after the establishment of IIT Kharagpur in 1951.

=== Role in World War II ===
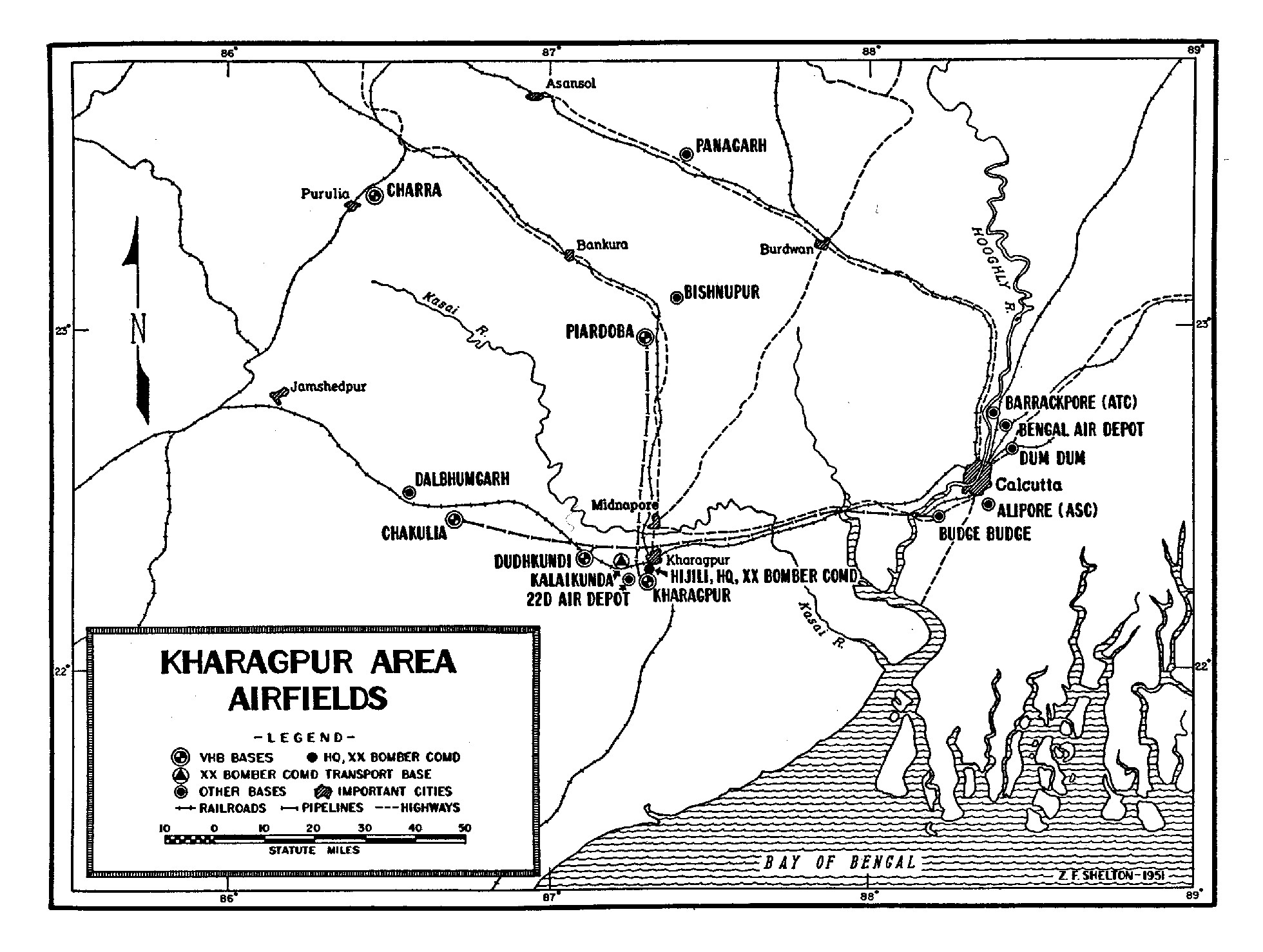
Kharagpur area airfields

On the Japanese front of World War II in 1944, the US Army Air Forces required air bases to send B-29s, a heavy bomber aircraft, to aerial bomb mainland Japan. Bases were set up to be used across locations in the 1912–1949 Republic of China, British Raj, and British Ceylon, in an operation known as Operation Matterhorn. Of the Indian airfields, Kharagpur became the key airfield to serve as the centre of operations. It was chosen as the airfield headquarters by Ken Wolfe, who headed the XX Bomber Command.

Initially, in December 1943, the plan was to expand the airfield runways chosen in India to make the runways operational for B-29 bombers. General William K. Harrison Jr. and a Colonel Wilson forwarded the plan to Mountbatten, then the Supreme Allied Commander of South East Asia, who accepted the proposal. Men were requested by the SOS engineers for making the runways 7,500 ft (2.3 kilometres) long and 150 ft (46 metres) wide. In January 1944, Lewis Pick released the 382nd Construction Battalion to speed up work on the Kharagpur airfield (or Kalaikunda Air Force Station) until the aviation engineers arrived. The work on the Kharagpur airfield, operated by 468th Bombardment Group, was completed by June 1944. Apart from its 7,500 ft (2.3 kilometres) long runway, it had 50 hardstands, hangars from the European theatre, operational buildings, and housing. The first B-29s left from the Kharagpur airfield to bomb Bangkok's railway shops on 5 June 1944 following which the next B-29s bombed the steel mills of Yawata on 14 June 1944. In total, the construction forces used in building the five Indian airfields, (Note: The five Indian airfields used in Operation Matterhorn were Salua, Kalaikunda (transport base and headquarters), Piardoba, Dudhkundi, and Chakulia.) which included Kharagpur, are figured to be some 6,000 U.S. troops, and 27,000 Indian civilians who worked on a contractual basis for the Central Public Works Department (CPWD).

=== Recent history (1947 to present) ===
Post-India's 1947 partition, Kharagpur had received a wave of East Bengali refugees, in particular Hindus, from the neighbouring then-East Pakistan (now Bangladesh). These refugees crossed the border as they were hit by unemployment crisis and post-partition violence such as the 1950 East Pakistan riots. The West Bengal government had sanctioned a few acres of land in the peripheral area of Kharagpur Railway Settlement to rehabilitate the East Bengali refugees. As of 2016, many of these refugees now live in Talbagicha, a locality within Kharagpur.

Kharagpur was one among many places in West Bengal where many farmers were left landless after the land acquisition was carried out by the state government in the 1990s and very less compensation was provided in the aftermath. Tatas, Birlas and Bansal Cement were among the few notable companies which wanted to build their factories in these acquired lands. For example, before the land acquisition, out of a sample 144 farmers, ones who owned 0.5–4.5 acres (0.20–1.82 hectares) of land were 75 per cent in total with none of them being landless and post-acquisition, 57 per cent remained in this bracket and 15 per cent became landless. In 2010, a Frontline report stated that the land acquisition by the Left Front government in the 1990s was unavoidable because of a limited amount of non-agricultural land in the state.

== Geography ==
=== Location ===
Kharagpur is located at 22.330239°N 87.323653°E. Also, it lies 116 kilometres (72 mi) west of Kolkata.

Kharagpur
R: rural / urban centre, F: facility, C: university, college, H: historical site
Factories / industrial centres are marked in slightly smaller letters and are not linked.
Owing to space constraints in the small map, the actual locations in a larger map may vary slightly

=== Urban area ===
Kharagpur proper covers an area of about 127 square kilometres (49 sq mi). The Kharagpur municipality's total area is 110.96 square kilometres (42.84 sq mi). The city has an elevation of 52 metres (171 ft) above sea level. The Kharagpur subdivision, with its headquarters located in Kharagpur city, covers an area of 2,913.17 square kilometres (1,124.78 sq mi) in the southern part of West Midnapore. The Dalma Hills stretch across its lands. Three significant rivers flow through the city: the Subarnarekha, Keleghai: and Kangsabati rivers.

Kharagpur has a railway colony that was established as a primary residence of British Raj officers as well as people of Anglo-Indian heritage. Hijli station is on the boundary of this railway colony, which also borders the villages of Jhapatapur and Jholi. IIT Kharagpur, one of the Institutes of National Importance in India, was also established adjacent to the colony.

Nimpura contains colonies that house over a thousand railway employees. There is a long and winding road from Nimpura to Hijli which goes through Tengra Haat (Arambati) and Talbagicha. Another road goes from Kalaikunda to Gopali through Hiradihi and Talbagicha.

Kharagpur Railway Colony (now called Kharagpur Railway Settlement) is self-sufficient in water supply, sanitation, and cleanliness. Around one-half of the railway workers live in the colony with the residences inspired by Victorian architecture. The residences of lower and middle-income railway workers each consists of two to three chambers and a patio surrounded by curved windows and ironworks. For senior officers and well-paid workers, each residence is a widely spaced bungalow featuring a large patio and a long and steep roof.

Outside the railway settlement, popular areas are Bhawanipur, Subhaspally, Kharida, Malancha, Inda, Jhapatapur, Talbagicha, and Prem Bazar, amongst others. Gole Bazar is a larger marketplace within Kharagpur which is 5 kilometres (3.1 mi) from IIT Kharagpur. Other marketplaces such as Talbagicha Bazar, Gate Bazar, Inda Bazar, Puratan Bazar, the Janata Market, the DVC Market, and the Tech Market are also important in Kharagpur.

The Hijli Co-operative society is a planned residential area in Kharagpur. The Kharagpur Municipality office and fire station are also located nearby.

=== Climate ===
Kharagpur

Climate chart (precipitation, max. and min. temperature)
J	F	M	A	M	J	J	A	S	O	N	D
19 27 14	41 30 18	38 33 22	46 35 24	148 36 26	277 34 26	278 32 26	301 32 26	284 32 25	162 32 23	31 30 19	11 27 15
- █ Average max. and min. temperatures in °C
- █ Precipitation totals in mm
- Source: myweather2 (archive link)
Imperial conversion
J	F	M	A	M	J	J	A	S	O	N	D
0.7 81 57	1.6 86 64	1.5 91 72	1.8 95 75	5.8 97 79	11 93 79	11 90 79	12 90 79	11 90 77	6.4 90 73	1.2 86 66	0.4 81 59
- █ Average max. and min. temperatures in °F
- █ Precipitation totals in inches

Kharagpur has a tropical savanna climate (Köppen climate classification Aw). Summers start in March and are hot and humid, with average temperatures close to 30 °C (86 degrees Fahrenheit). The monsoon season follows; it sees an average of about 1,678 mm (66.1 inches) of rain. In 2026, over 2,200 mm (87 inches) of rainfall was recorded. Winters are brief, lasting from December to mid-February, with average temperatures around 21 °C (70 degrees Fahrenheit).

== Demographics ==
Historical population
Year	Pop.	±%
1911	18,957	—
1921	25,280	+33.4%
1931	58,134	+130.0%
1941	87,135	+49.9%
1951	129,636	+48.8%
1961	147,253	+13.6%
1971	161,257	+9.5%
1981	232,575	+44.2%
1991	258,390	+11.1%
2001	272,865	+5.6%
2011	299,683	+9.8%
Source: Census of India

Kharagpur is the fourth largest city of West Bengal by area, after Kolkata, Durgapur, and Asansol. It is the ninth most populous city of West Bengal. The city is known as "Mini India" because of its mixed ethnicity and linguistic diversity.

As of the 2001 census of India, Kharagpur had a population of 207,984 (municipality area) and 88,339 (railway settlement area). Males constituted 52% of the population and females 48%. Kharagpur had an average literacy rate of 64%, higher than the national average of 59.5%: male literacy was 75%, and female literacy was 52%. One-tenth (10%) of its population was under 6 years of age. Kharagpur Urban Agglomeration at the time had a population of 272,865.

As of the 2011 census of India, Kharagpur Urban Agglomeration had a population of 299,683 out of which 153,143 were males and 146,540 were females. The population aged 0–6 years was 27,465. Effective literacy rate for the population aged seven and above was 77.10%. This is higher than the national average literacy rate of 74%.

Religion in Kharagpur
Religion	Percent
Hinduism	82.73%
Islam	11.33%
Christianity	1.88%
Other or not stated	4.04%

=== Languages ===
Languages spoken in Kharagpur Urban agglomeration (2011)
1. Bengali (45.5%)
2. Hindi (21.6%)
3. Telugu (14.8%)
4. Odia (7.20%)
5. Urdu (3.70%)
6. Other (7.20%)

Bengali is the most commonly spoken language of the region. Other common languages are Hindi, Urdu, Odia, Telugu, and Punjabi.

== Civic administration and utility services ==
Kharagpur Municipality looks after civic affairs in the city. There is a proposal to upgrade it to a Municipal corporation after including the railway area under its jurisdiction. The responsibility of passenger amenities, ride safety, and routine inspection in railway area lies with the Divisional Railway Manager (DRM), Kharagpur Division, who is also the head of railway establishment in Kharagpur.

Kharagpur (town) police station has jurisdiction over Kharagpur municipality. Kharagpur (local) police station has jurisdiction over Kharagpur I and Kharagpur II CD Blocks. Kharagpur also has a fire station in Jhapetapur. In the two fire incidents taking place in 2021 followed by 2023 in IIT Kharagpur, a timely response from the fire brigade prevented any casualties.

The state government in 2017 proposed on setting up a separate police commissionerate at Kharagpur to enhance security in this growing region.

State-owned Bharat Sanchar Nigam Limited and private Bharti Airtel, Jio, and Vodafone Idea, are the leading telephone, cell phone, and internet providers in the city.

== Education ==
The first Indian Institute of Technology, IIT Kharagpur, one of the Institutes of National Importance, was founded in Kharagpur in May 1950 and formally established in 1951. It is also the largest IIT with an area of 2,100 acres (8.5 square kilometres). Other colleges of note in Kharagpur are Kharagpur College (also known as Inda College), Hijli College, Kharagpur Homoeopathic Medical College and Hospital, Dr B C Roy Institute of Medical Sciences & Research.

The schools which serve students from pre-primary to higher secondary level in Kharagpur include St. Agnes School (two branches), BNR Excellence Academy, Sacred Heart High School, Kendriya Vidyalaya (three branches), D.A.V. Model School, and Hijli High School.

== Economy ==
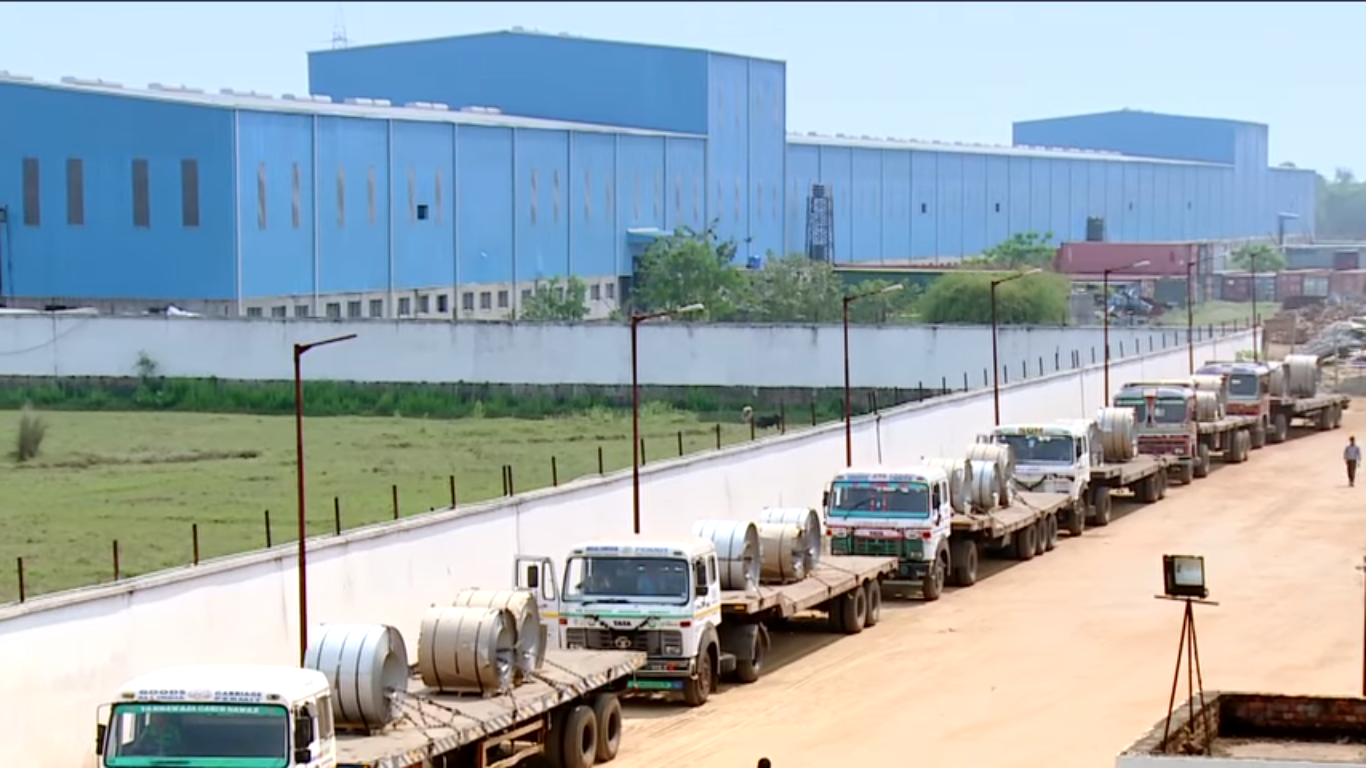
Inside Vidyasagar Industrial Park at Kharagpur

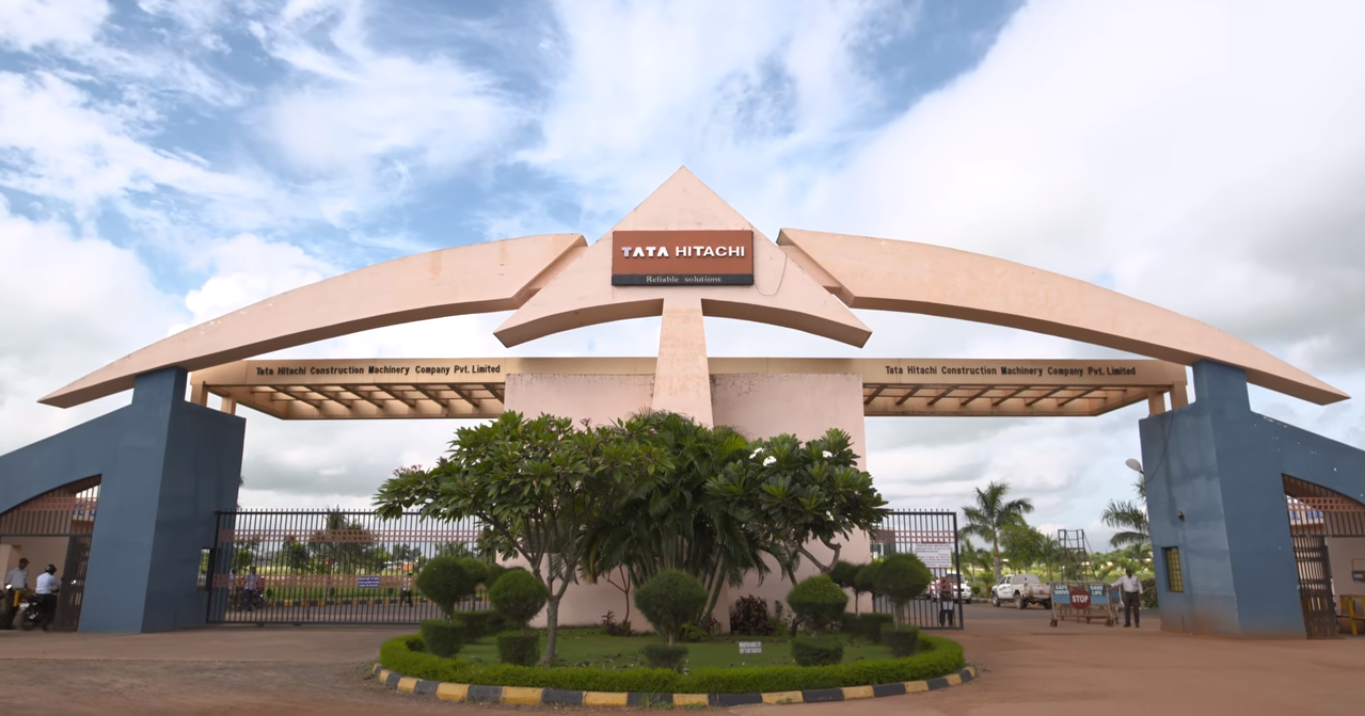
Entrance of Tata Hitachi facility at Vidyasagar Industrial Park, Kharagpur

Kharagpur has one of the largest industrial setups in West Bengal. Because of the city's proximity to Kolkata, several large industrial plants are located in Kharagpur. Also, Kharagpur has a good rail as well as road network via NH 6 and NH 60, and has ready availability of labour and raw materials. Significant establishments such as Tata Metaliks, Tata Bearings, Shyam Metaliks, Siemens, Godrej, Tata Hitachi, Humboldt Wedag, Ramco Cements, Grasim Industries, Indian Oil, Keventer Agro, Mahindra & Mahindra, Aditya Birla Group, and Reshmi Cement have set up their plants in and around Kharagpur. Many small iron rolling mills and rice mills dot the city. The Vidyasagar Industrial Park is also located here. West Bengal Electronics Development Limited (WEBEL), a West Bengal government undertaking, had completed establishing an Information technology park for IT businesses and startups in Kharagpur in 2016 and as of 2026 it is operational in the city.

Kharagpur will be part of two new economic corridors (EC)–EC-1 Mumbai-Kolkata, and EC-14 Kharagpur-Siliguri–under the Bharatmala project. In late 2017, the government revealed plans to establish a civilian airport.

In Kharagpur, Chowringhee and Inda, two of its major localities, are where new construction projects are taking shape. Big Bazaar, operated by the Future Group, was the first mall to open in Kharagpur. It remained the only mall in the town for nearly a decade until it closed in 2022.

== Transport ==
=== Railways ===
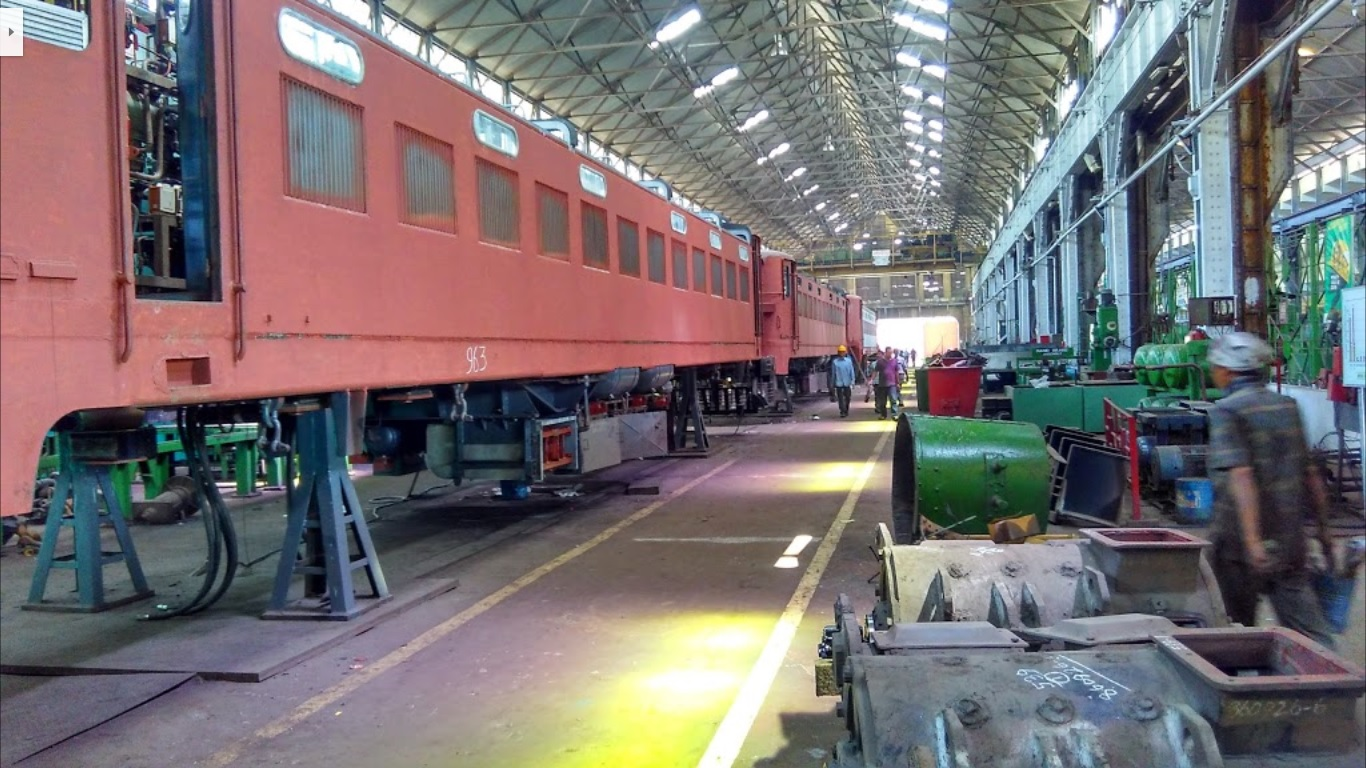
Kharagpur Railway Workshop

South Eastern Railways (or Bengal Nagpur Railways) was formed in 1887, and it opened its Sini–Kharagpur–Kolaghat line and the Kharagpur–Cuttack line between 1898 and 99. It is the most vital section of the Bengal Nagpur Railways. Kharagpur Junction railway station was established in December 1898. The maintenance workshop for South Eastern Railways was built at Kharagpur in 1898. The workshop has expanded its capabilities over time, such as servicing the type of rolling stock manufactured and periodic overhauling (POH) done, and as of 2020 is the largest maintenance workshop in the Indian Railways. The Kharagpur–Kolaghat line was built in April 1900 after the bridge over the Rupnarayan River was completed. On 1 February 1901, the Kharagpur-Midnapore line was opened for service. The public reaction to the introduction of railways in Kharagpur was recorded in Prothom Prohor, a novel by Ramapada Chowdhury, who was born and brought up there. In the novel, Chowdhury writes that when the first train resumed its journey after shunting at the station, the villagers who were at first keen to see it fled in fright because of the whistling of the steam engine and also by the long line of linked coaches as it reminded them of a snake.

In 1984, a broad-gauge line for Tamluk–Digha was approved by the 7th Lok Sabha's Railway Convention Committee, and a budget was assigned. This line, which took 20 years to complete, was built in two phases. The first phase was to link Tamluk–Contai which was operational from 20 November 2003, and the second phase, for Contai–Digha, was completed on 30 December 2004. As of June 2025, the Kharagpur railway junction has the fourth longest railway platform in the world, with a length of 1,072 m (0.666 miles), after Hubbali, Gorakhpur, and Kollam junctions. It also has Asia's largest railway Solid State Interlocking system.

In 2013, the Dedicated Freight Corridor Corporation of India Limited proposed a plan to have an East Coast Dedicated Freight Corridor (East Coast DFC), stretching from Kharagpur, West Bengal to Vijayawada, Andhra Pradesh. According to an Indian Railways official, the East Coast DFC will cover a length of approximately 1,200 kilometres (750 miles) starting at Kharagpur and ending at Tenali, Andhra Pradesh (extended). This DFC will be used to transport coal, fertiliser, iron ore, and steel. In a 19 March 2025 press release, the Ministry of Railways announced that it is preparing a detailed project report for the East Coast DFC and as of 2026 the project is yet to begin.

In December 2025, a new railway bridge was planned for constructing over the Rupnarayan River; it will replace the old bridge that was servicing the Kharagpur–Kolaghat line. The bridge will cost over ₹4,810,000,000 to build, and it is expected to serve the line for at least the next 100 years. This project also involved the development of Kolaghat railway station to elevate its platform on a diverted alignment.

Former captain of the India national cricket team, Mahendra Singh Dhoni, worked as a ticket collector at the Kharagpur Railway station from 2001 to the end of 2003, before commencing his cricket career playing for India. Dhoni's museum can be found in the South Eastern Railways Sports Authority's stadium complex where he played for a few years while working as a ticket collector in Kharagpur. The museum housed in one of the rooms where Dhoni lived also displays his South Eastern Railways contract dated to 14 July 2001. Dhoni lived in Kharagpur until 2004.

== Healthcare ==
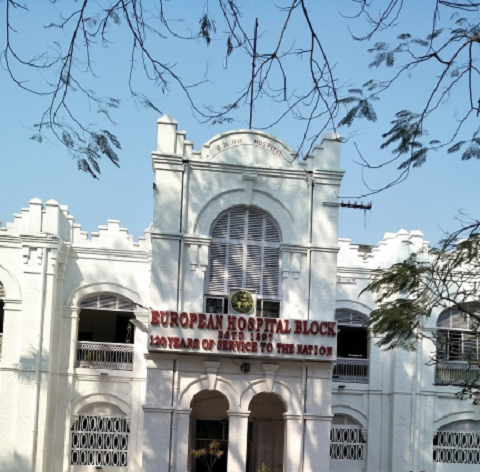
European Block of Railway Hospital Kharagpur

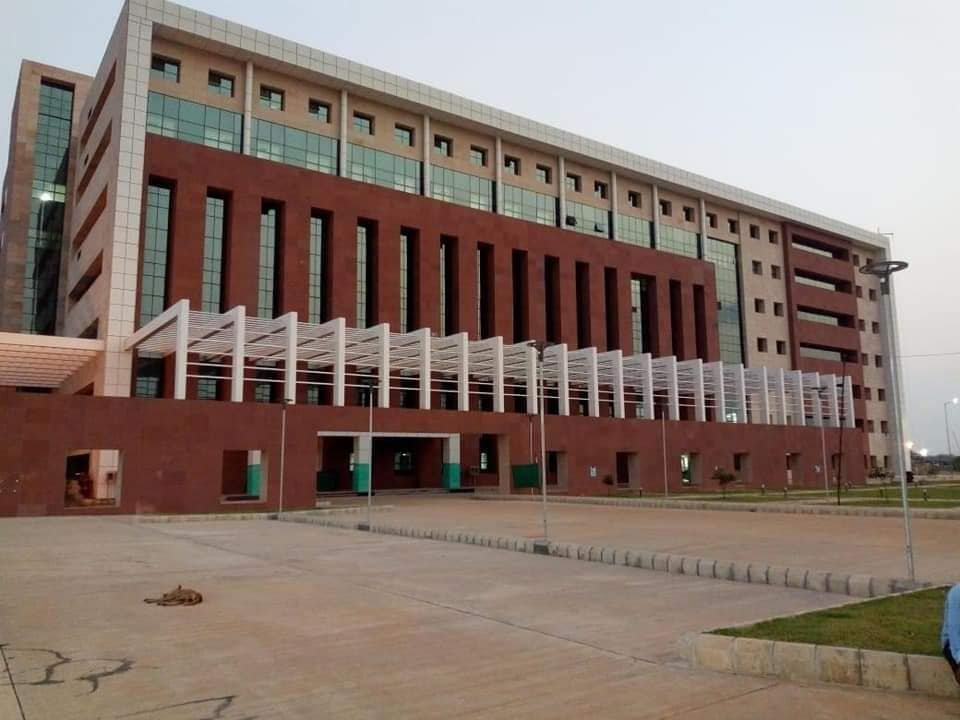
Dr B C Roy Institute of Medical Sciences & Research

After the establishment of the Kharagpur Railway Hospital (formerly BNR Railway Hospital), Arthur Martin-Leake, having passed the Fellowship of the Royal Colleges of Surgeons examination in 1903, was appointed as its Chief Medical Officer (CMO). Martin-Leake remained the hospital's CMO for thirty years, with a few stints of leave to be on active service with the British Army.

Since 2018, the Railway Main Hospital and Kharagpur Sub-divisional Hospital (also known as Chandmari Hospital) are the main public sector hospitals in Kharagpur. Also in 2018, as the city lies on an important junction of state and national highways, a trauma care centre of level-3 category was set up in the Kharagpur Sub-divisional Hospital. A number of private clinics and nursing homes also operate here. IIT Kharagpur has a medical college cum hospital, Dr B C Roy Institute of Medical Sciences & Research.

== Culture ==
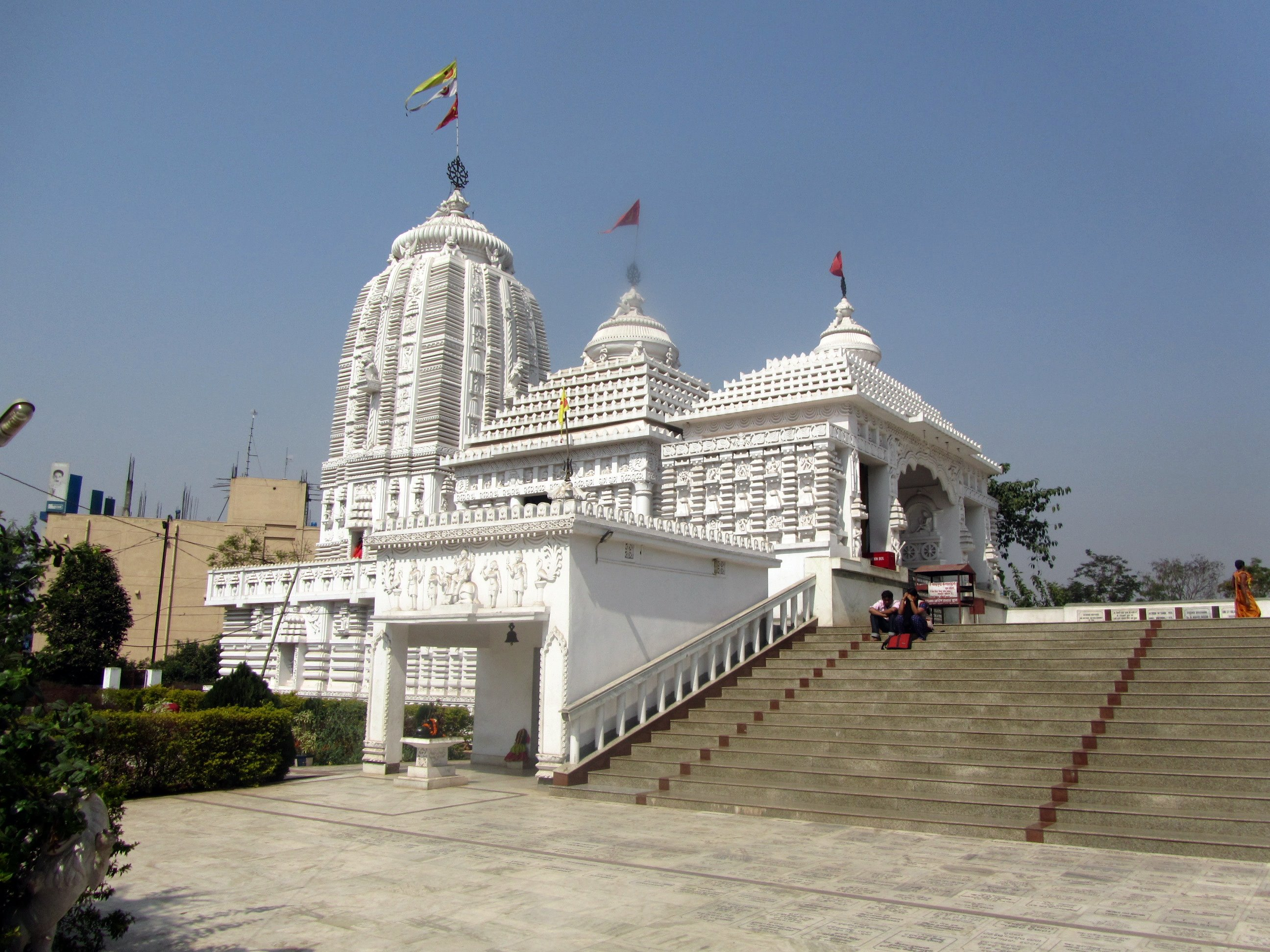
Places of worship in Kharagpur: Jagannath temple on Nimpura Road, and a nativity scene observed in Sacred Heart Church

Places of worship in Kharagpur include Durga Temple and Jama Masjid at Gole Bazar and at Kharida; Sitala Temple at Puratan Bazar; Kanak Durga Temple near Nimpura; Jagannath Temple near Gate Bazar; Gurdwara at Subhaspally and at Nimpura; Jalaram Temple at Jhapatapur; and St. Antony's Church and Sacred Heart Church at the Railway Settlement Area.

Kharagpur has a book fair (Kharagpur Boimela in Bengali), which started in 2000 and is held every January. Its event schedule include a dance performance, a recital, and a selected writer awarded the Anil Ghorai Memorial Award. The book fair's 2018 edition at the end had a music concert starred by the Indian singer, Alka Yagnik.

The city also has a multiplex named Bombay Cineplex, and is the city's oldest cinema hall in operation since 1940. In July 2016, it underwent a renovation with food court, air conditioning, and modern audiovisual system added. This upgrade took ten months at a total cost of ₹5,000,000.
