= Midnapore railway station =

Railway Station in West Bengal

MIDNAPORE
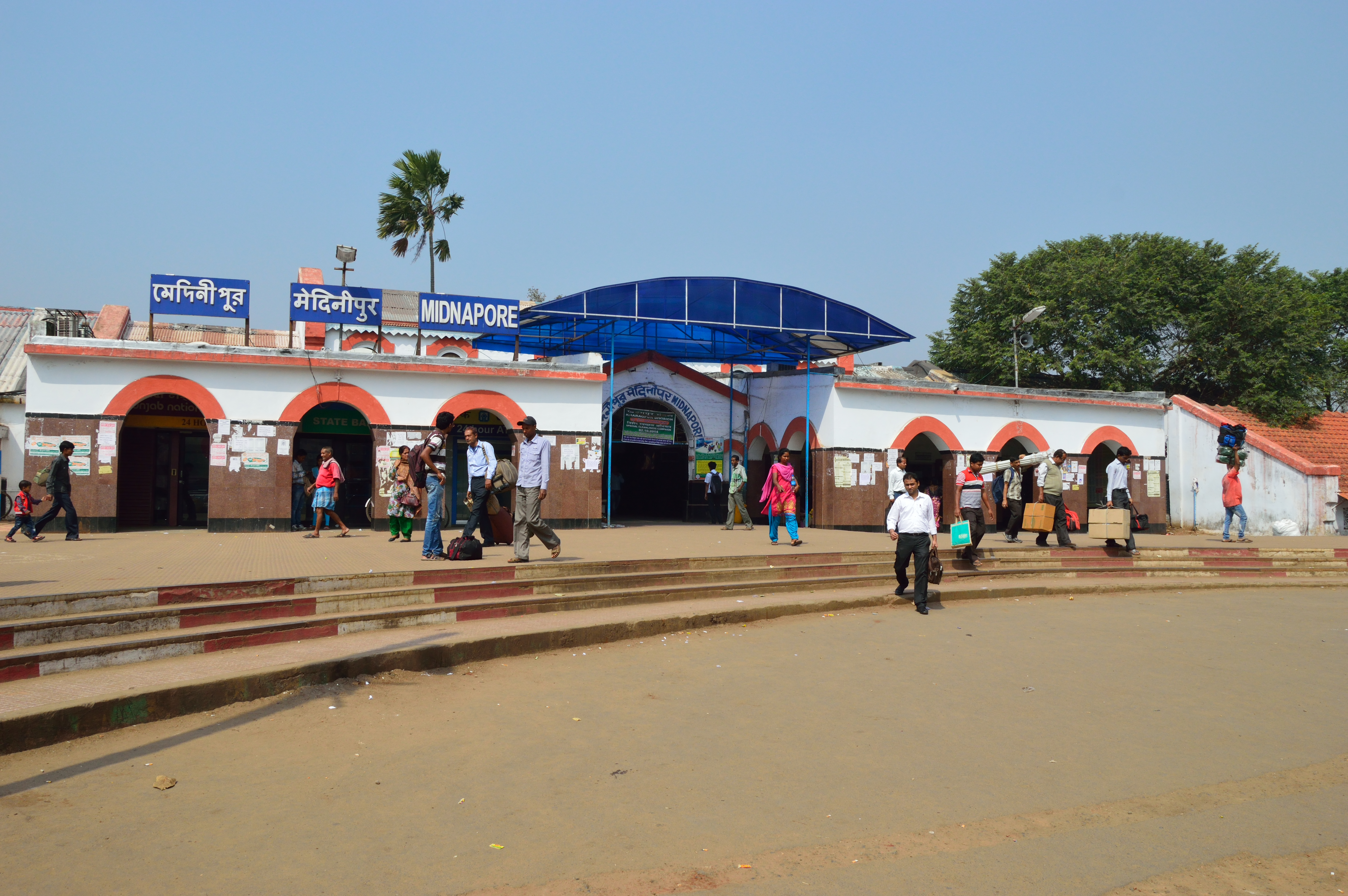

General information
- Location: Midnapore, Paschim Medinipur district, West Bengal; India
- Coordinates: 22°25′35″N 87°18′29″E
- Elevation: 52 metres (171 ft)
- System: Indian Railways
- Owner: Indian railway
- Operator: South Eastern Railways
- Line: Kharagpur–Bankura–Adra line
- Platforms: 3
- Tracks: 5

Construction
- Structure type: At grade
- Parking: Yes

Other information
- Status: Functioning
- Station code: MDN
- Zone(s): South Eastern Railway
- Division(s): Kharagpur

History
- Opened: 1903–04
- Former names: Bengal Nagpur Railway

Services
Preceding station	Indian Railways	Following station
Jangalmahal Bhadutala towards Adra Junction	South Eastern Railway zone Kharagpur–Bankura–Adra line	Cossye Halt towards Kharagpur Junction
Route map
Location
- Location within West Bengal Location within India

Midnapore is an important railway station on the Kharagpur–Bankura–Adra line in Kharagpur railway division of South Eastern Railway zone. It mainly serves the Midnapore city in Paschim Medinipur district in the Indian state of West Bengal. Total 66 trains including express and passenger stop here.

== History ==
In 1901, the Kharagpur–Midnapur Branch line was opened. The Midnapore–Jharia extension of the Bengal Nagpur Railway, passing through Bankura District was opened in 1903–04. The Adra–Bheduasol sector was electrified in 1997–98 and the Bheduasol–Salboni sector in 1998–99.
