= Rajendra Mishra School of Engineering Entrepreneurship =

Entrepreneurship school in India

- Type: Public
- Established: 2010
- Parent institution: Indian Institute of Technology Kharagpur
- Director: Virendra Kumar Tewari
- Head: C. S. Kumar
- Location: Kharagpur, West Bengal, India; 22°19′10.97″N 87°18′35.87″E
- Nickname: RMSoEE
- Website: www.see.iitkgp.ac.in

Rajendra Mishra School of Engineering Entrepreneurship is the entrepreneurship school of Indian Institute of Technology Kharagpur which offers graduate and doctoral programs in entrepreneurship for engineers. The school also offers an option to all the undergraduate students of IIT Kharagpur to opt for an integrated dual degree course, which would offer them a master's degree in entrepreneurship apart from a bachelor's degree in the respective branch of engineering the student may be enrolled in. Besides classroom education, it aims to provide practical experience as well as seed funding to the aspiring entrepreneurs of IIT Kharagpur.

== Establishment and growth ==
Aiming to integrate the practice and academic aspects of entrepreneurship in IIT Kharagpur, the school was established in 2010, and was later named after Late Professor Rajendra Mishra, who was one of the founders of IIT Kharagpur in 1951. It was set up with generous grants from IIT Kharagpur alumni, including the sons of late Professor Mishra - Devendra Mishra and Amarendra Mishra, who also are the alumni of IIT Kharagpur. In 2017, the school has joined hands with Pepperdine University of the United States to boost the entrepreneurship initiative and technological knowledge exchange.

== Facilities and support for entrepreneurial development ==
Besides classroom education, the school aims to provide practical experience as well as seed funding to its students. The seed funds are arranged either by grants from the alumni, or by grants from the Government of India. Each student of the school is provided two mentors, one from within the institute and one external mentor, usually an established entrepreneur. The school building within the IIT Kharagpur campus also houses incubators.
