= Rajendra Mishra =

Indian educationist

Rajendra Mishra (1919–1977) was an Indian Professor and education pioneer known for being one of the founders of the first of the Indian Institutes of Technology (IIT) at IIT Kharagpur, in 1951. He helped establish the institute's infrastructure, pioneered the engineering disciplines of mechanical, production, and industrial engineering, and launched the study of management science in India. His contributions were unprecedented when he forged a relationship between industry and academia through collaborative programmes. He brought his industrial experience to the educational system of IIT Kharagpur and embraced the best engineering and management practices from the US and Europe to build the foundation for a world-class engineering university over a time span of 27 years in India.

Mishra was an influential personality in the field of industrial engineering and management in India. He is reputed to be the first management teacher in the country. He established the Department of Management Studies in 1954 at IIT Kharagpur along with Sir Jahangir Ghandhy, former president of India Shri; V. V. Giri, former minister of higher education; Dr. Triguna Sen, developer of one of the first executive development programmes in India.

In his tenure at IIT Kharagpur, he held several academic positions including head of Mechanical Engineering Department, dean of planning and coordination, and deputy director of the institute. He was also principal of Regional Engineering College, Rourkela.

In 2010, IIT Kharagpur named its new engineering entrepreneurship center the "Rajendra Mishra School of Engineering Entrepreneurship" in honor of Mishra. The school was set up with generous grants from the sons of late Professor Mishra, Devendra Mishra and Amarendra Mishra, who are also alumni of IIT Kharagpur.
