= Basanta Kumar Sahu =

Indian geologist (born 1937)

- Born: 19 February 1937 (age 89); Odisha, India
- Education: Ravenshaw College; IIT Kharagpur; University of Wisconsin, Madison
- Known for: Development of statistical and mathematical models
- Awards: 1980 Shanti Swarup Bhatnagar Prize; 1981 Society of Geologists and Allied Technologists Silver Medal
- Scientific career
- Fields: Mathematical modelling; Sedimentology
- Workplaces: Panjab University; National Institute of Technology, Rourkela; IIT Bombay

Basanta Kumar Sahu (born 1937) is an Indian mathematical geologist, sedimentologist and a Professor Emeritus at the Indian Institute of Technology, Bombay. He is for known for his mathematical and quantitative studies in geology and the development of statistical and mathematical models. A founder member of the founded the International Association of Mathematical Geologists, he is a member of the American Association of Petroleum Geologists and the Society of Economic Paleontologists and Mineralogists. The Council of Scientific and Industrial Research, the apex agency of the Government of India for scientific research, awarded him the Shanti Swarup Bhatnagar Prize for Science and Technology, one of the highest Indian science awards for his contributions to Earth, Atmosphere, Ocean and Planetary Sciences in 1980.

== Biography ==
B. K. Sahu, born on 19 February 1937 in the Indian state of Odisha, completed his graduate studies (BSc hons)) at Ravenshaw College, Cuttack in 1956 and joined the Indian Institute of Technology, Kharagpur from where he obtained a master's degree in engineering in 1958. Moving to the US, he did his doctoral studies at University of Wisconsin, Madison as an ATCM fellow and after securing a PhD in 1962, he returned to India to start his career at Panjab University. Later, he moved to Regional Engineering College, Rourkela (present-day National Institute of Technology, Rourkela) where he served as an assistant professor and head of the department of geology until he was appointed as a professor at the Indian Institute of Technology, Mumbai in 1976. He spent the rest of his academic career at IIT Mumbai and superannuated from service as the head of the department of geology in 1997. Post-retirement, he continues his association with the institute as an honorary emeritus professor.

Sahu is known as a pioneer of mathematical geology and is credited with introducing mathematical and quantitative approaches to the science. He used multivariate and time series procedures to interpret the statistical and mathematical models of sediments and ore deposits for which he designed computer-aided techniques. His work is detailed in one book, Statistical Models in Earth Sciences, and chapters contributed to books edited by others. His studies have been cited by several authors.

Sahu was among the scientists who founded the International Association for Mathematical Geosciences, a society of geoscientists, in 1968. He is a life member of the American Association of Petroleum Geologists and a former member of the Society of Economic Paleontologists and Mineralogists. In India, he has been associated with several government agencies; he sat in the advisory council of the University Grants Commission of India during 1965–80, Oil Industries Development Board of the Ministry of Petroleum and Natural Gas from 1982 to 1986, the project advisory committee of the Department of Science and Technology during 1980–86 and 1998–2000, and the management board of the Geological Survey of India during 1992–95. He served as the coordinator of the Korba Thermal Power Project and the NTPC project on Ash-pond location and was a member of the Board of Governors of IIT Mumbai in 1996. He was also associated with the Council of Scientific and Industrial Research as the principal investigator for the preparation of books on mathematical geology during 1997–2000.

== Awards and honors ==
Basu held the Technical Cooperation Mission fellowship from 1958 to 1961. The Council of Scientific and Industrial Research awarded him the Shanti Swarup Bhatnagar Prize, one of the highest Indian science awards, in 1980. In 1981, he received the Silver Medal of the Society of Geologists and Allied Technologists.

== Selected bibliography ==
Books

- B. K. Sahu (2005). Statistical Models in Earth Sciences. BS Publications. p. 211. ISBN 9788178000794.

Chapters

- N. Janardhana Raju (Editor), B. K. Sahu (chapter) (30 November 2015). Geostatistical and Geospatial Approaches for the Characterization of Natural Resources in the Environment: Challenges, Processes and Strategies. Springer. pp. 153–. ISBN 978-3-319-18663-4.

== See also ==
- Sedimentology
