= Baidyanath Misra =

Indian economist, educationist, author, and administrator (1920–2019)

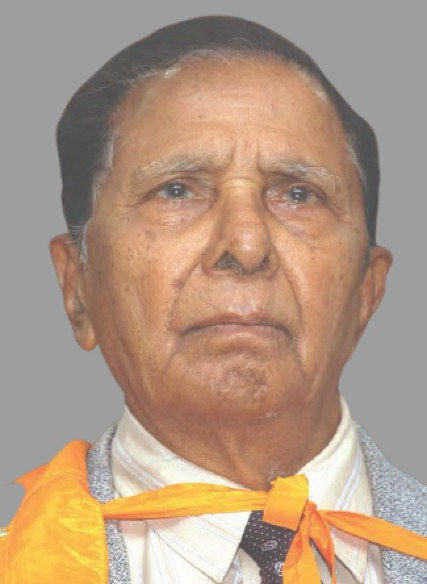
- Born: 22 November 1920; Khordha, Bihar and Orissa Province, British India
- Died: 8 May 2019 (aged 98); Bhubaneswar, Odisha, India
- Education: Ravenshaw University; University of Allahabad; University of Pennsylvania; Utkal University
- Occupations: Economist; Educationist; Author; Administrator
- Employer: Government of Odisha
- Spouse: Basanti Misra
- Children: Basant, Jayant, Sukant, Bijayalaxmi
- Parent(s): Mahadev Misra (Father); Manika Devi (Mother)
- Awards: Odisha Sahitya Academy Award

Baidyanath Misra (22 November 1920 – 8 May 2019) was an Indian economist, educator, author, and administrator from the state of Odisha. He served as the Vice-Chancellor of the Odisha University of Agriculture and Technology, Deputy-Chairman of Odisha State Planning Board, Chairman of Odisha's First State Finance Commission, Secretary of Odisha State Welfare Board, founder Secretary and President of Orissa Economics Association, and the founder Director and Chairman of Nabakrushna Choudhury Centre for Development Studies. He wrote 16 books in English and 20 in Odia. He was also a columnist in several leading Odia journals and newspapers. He organised several camps across Odisha, for helping the cause of the poor and downtrodden.

== Education ==
Misra received his Bachelor of Arts degree in economics from Ravenshaw University, followed by a Master of Arts degree from the University of Allahabad in 1948, and was the topper at both the institutions. He was also the first Odia topper of the Faculty of Arts and the Department of Economics of Allahabad University. He received two gold medals from Sarojini Naidu (the then ex officio Chancellor of the University of Allahabad, being the Governor of the United Provinces) during the convocation, one each from the Arts faculty and the Economics department. He completed another master's degree in economics from Wharton School of the University of Pennsylvania on a Fulbright Scholarship, where he studied under the Nobel laureate, Simon Kuznets. After returning to India, he did a PhD from Utkal University.

== Career ==
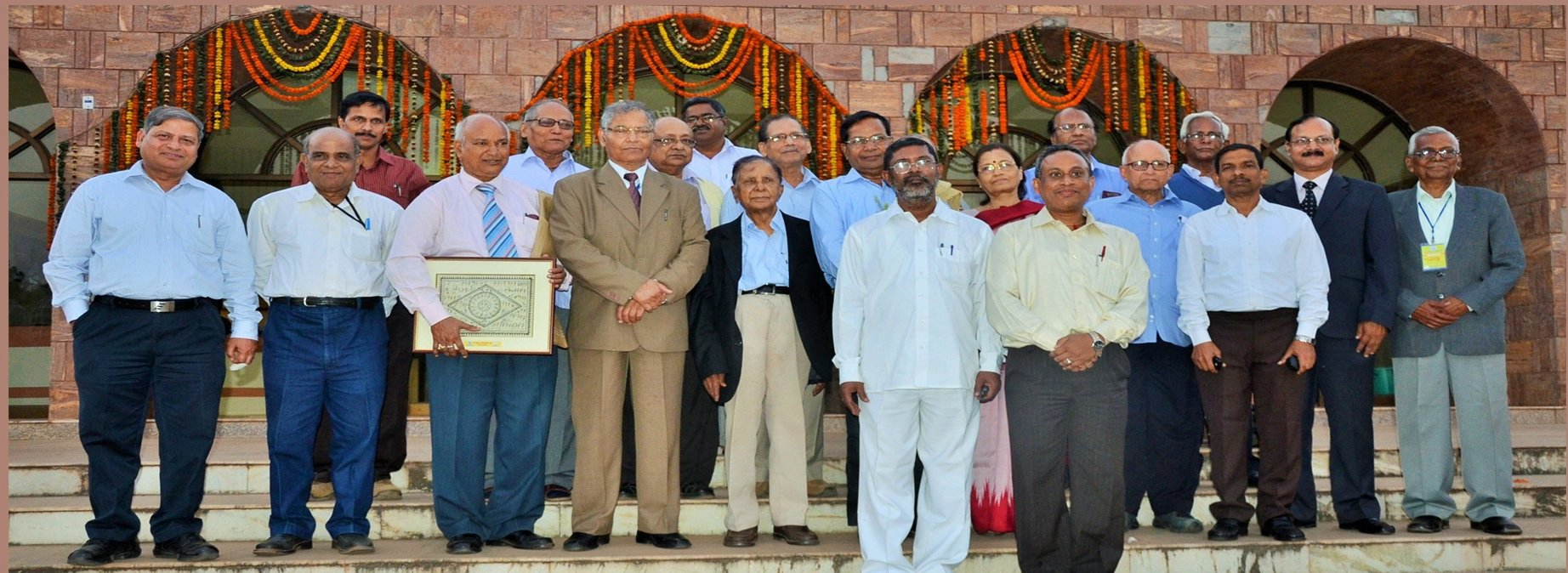
At the 45th annual conference of the Orissa Economics Association

Having started his career as a lecturer in Ravenshaw College, he moved to Utkal University as a professor and the head of the department of Analytical & Applied Economics, where he instituted two academic chairs, funded by the Reserve Bank of India and the State Bank of India. He served as the Vice-Chancellor of the Odisha University of Agriculture and Technology from 1981 to 1985. During his tenure as the VC of OUAT, he established the College of Engineering and Technology, Bhubaneswar, College of Agriculture, Sambalpur, College of Home Science, Bhubaneswar, and the College of Fisheries, Ganjam. He headed the Odisha State Planning Board from 1985 to 1990. In 1987, he founded the Nabakrushna Choudhury Centre for Development Studies (NCDS), in Bhubaneswar, which is jointly funded by the Indian Council of Social Science Research (ICSSR), Government of India, and the Government of Odisha. He was also a member of the panel of economists of the Planning Commission of India and the Odisha Pay Commission.

== Recognition ==
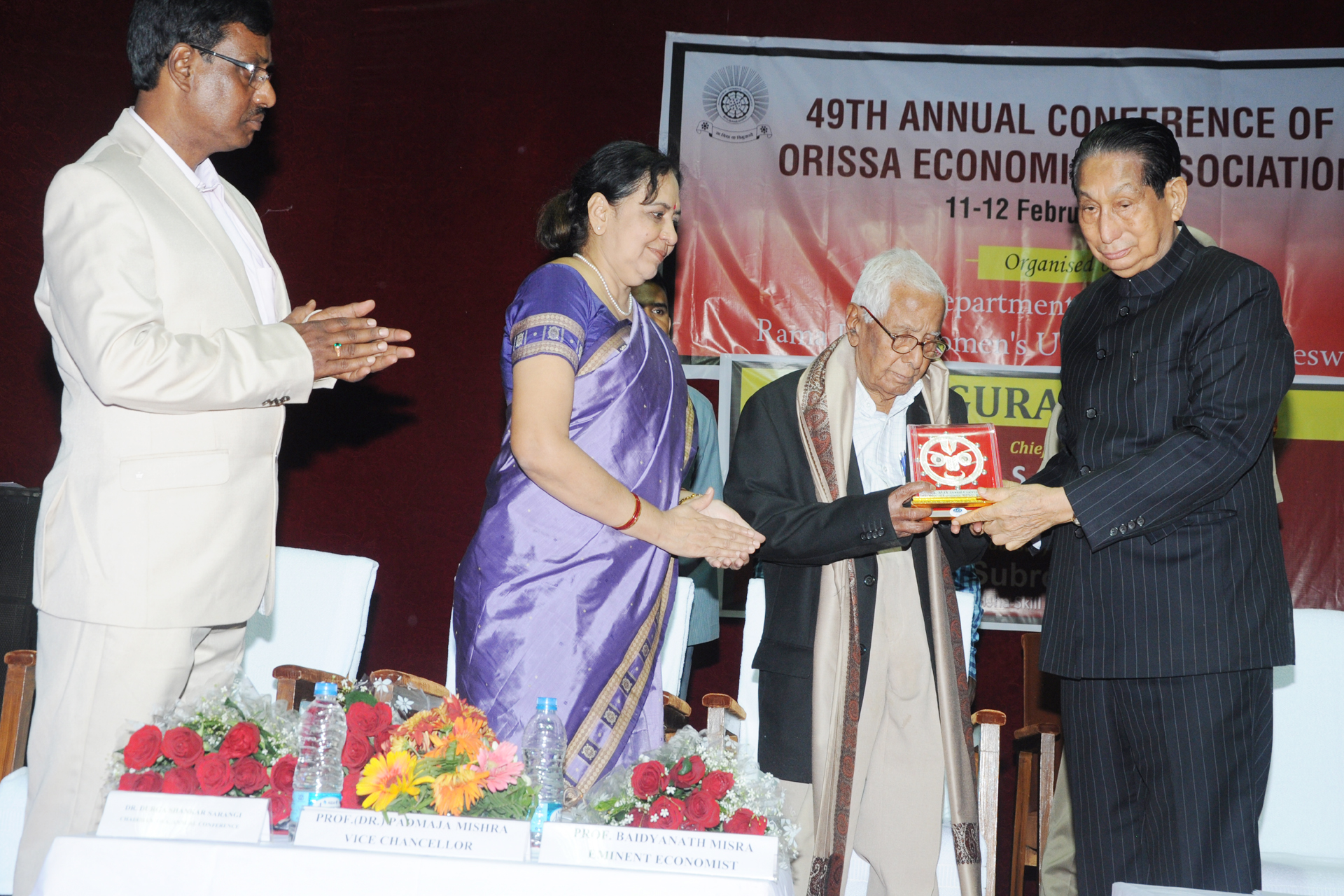
Prof. Misra being felicitated by the Governor of Odisha, S C Jamir

- He received an honorary doctorate from KIIT University in 2012, for his contributions to Economics.
- The Chief Minister of Odisha, Naveen Patnaik, conferred on him the Think Odisha Leadership Award in 2010, jointly with the AICTE Chairman and the Director of IIT Kharagpur, Damodar Acharya, for their contributions in the field of education.
- He was also awarded the Odisha Sahitya Academy Award in 1996, for his contributions to Odia literature, in addition to the Nandighosh award and Vishub Milan award.

== Family ==
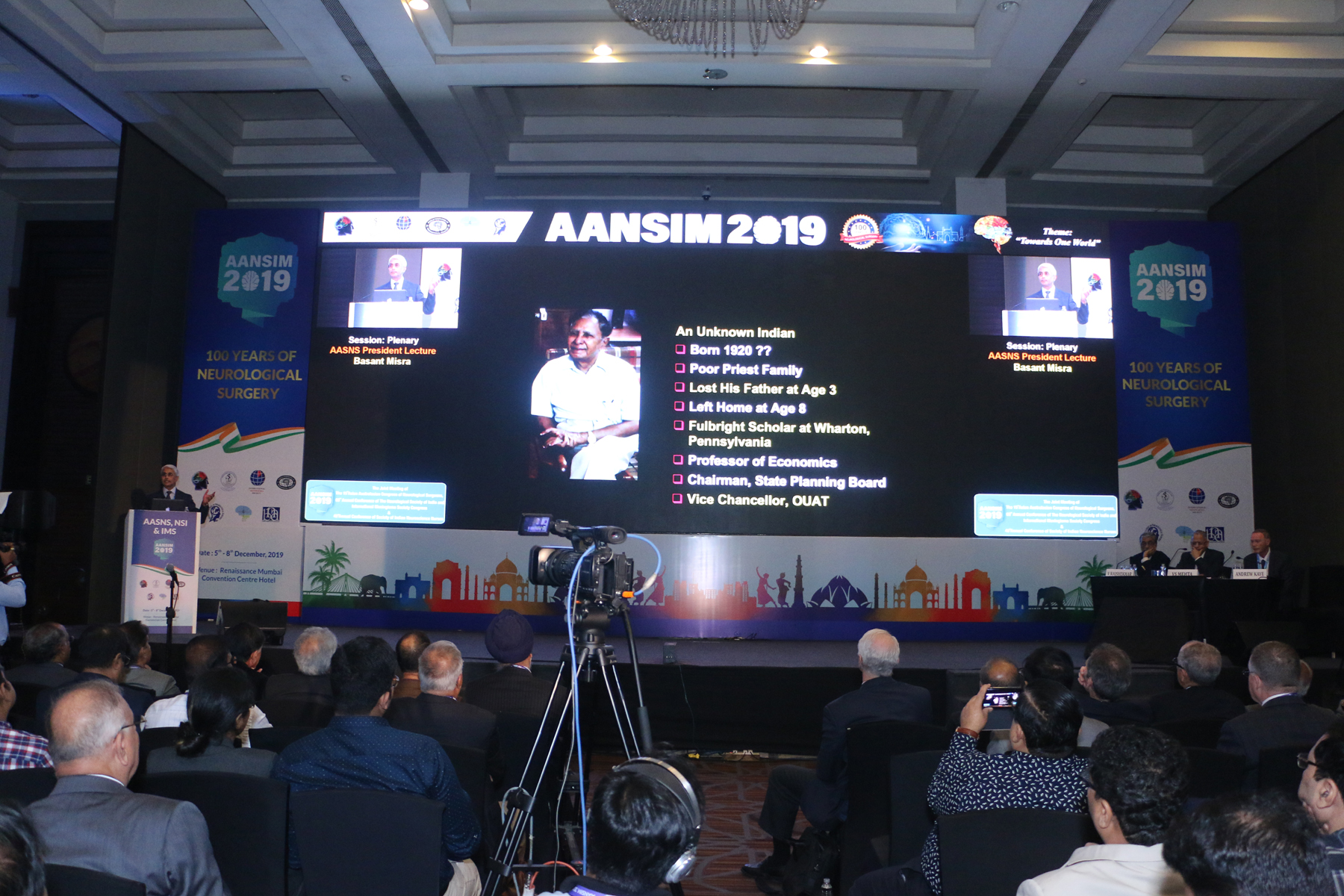
His son describing milestones in Prof. Misra's lifetime

He was born to Mahadev Misra and Manika Devi, in Khordha. He was married to Basanti Misra, a homemaker and a post-graduate in arts. The couple's children include a daughter, Bijayalaxmi, who is married to Ajatsatru Tripathy, an ophthalmologist; and three sons, Basant, who did his MS general surgery from Delhi University and MCh in neurosurgery from AIIMS, New Delhi, and is the Chief of Surgery and the Chairman of Neurosurgery at Hinduja Hospitals; Jayant, who did graduation in electrical engineering from IIT Roorkee and MEP from IIM Ahmedabad, and is currently Director & Chief Operating Officer of Indian Metals & Ferro Alloys; and Sukant, who did post-graduation and doctorate in economics from Utkal University and Mississippi State University, and is currently dean and vice-provost at Texas Technical University.

== Legacy ==
- The Orissa Economics Association annually organises the Prof. Baidyanath Misra Lecture in his memory. The association also presents the Professor Baidyanath Misra Best Paper Award.
- His eldest son and a noted neurosurgeon, Basant Misra, started the Baidyanath Neurosurgery Charitable Trust, in his honour.

== Bibliography ==
=== English ===
- Economic Profile of India
- Economic Liberalisation and Regional Disparities in India
- Economics of Public Finance
- Capitalism, Socialism and Planning
- Development, Deprivation, and Welfare Policy
- Poverty, Unemployment and Rural Development
- Population Stabilisation and Development
- Growth and Governance
- Structural Change
- Fiscal Policy in the Context of Planning: An Analysis of Keynesian Economics in Relation to Economic Development
- Reference Orissa: An Indian State of Eastern Region
- Cooperative Movement in India: A Case Study of an Indian State
- Studies in the Economics of Farm Management in Cuttack District, Orissa
- Socialism and Market Economy: Proceedings of Seminar on Socialism and Market Economy
- Agro-industries and Economic Development: A Vision for the 21st Century
- Seminar Papers on Rural Development
- Agricultural Development: Problems and Prospects
- Economic Development of Orissa
- Political Economy of Development
- Strategy of Development Planning
- Contemporary Economic System
- Pursuit of Destiny (Autobiography)

=== Odia ===
- Anucintā
- Ārthanītikayojanā
- Puñjibāda, sāmyabāda, o Gāndhibāda
- Rāmarājyare aśānti
- Rājanītira sukha duḥkha
- Smr̥ti-tīrtha
- Samāja o sabhyatā
- Sāmājika mūlyabodha

=== Other publications ===
60 Research Papers, 10 Research Reports. He regularly contributed articles to Odia magazines and Odia newspapers.
