= Damodar Acharya =

Professor at IIT Kharagpur

Director at Indian Institute of Technology Kharagpur
- In office 1 July 2007 – 30 June 2012
- Preceded by: Shishir Dube
- Succeeded by: Partha Pratim Chakraborty

Professor at Indian Institute of Technology Kharagpur

Personal details
- Born: 1949 (age 76–77)
- Education: IIT Kharagpur; NIT Rourkela
- Profession: Professor

Damodar Acharya is an Indian engineer and educationist. He served as the director of the Indian Institute of Technology Kharagpur from July 2007 to 30 June 2012. The government nominated Acharya as a director on the central board of the Reserve Bank of India in October 2012.

== Career ==
Professor Damodar Acharya received his Ph.D. (in 1975) and M.Tech. in IE & OR (in 1972) degrees from IIT Kharagpur, and B.Sc.(Engineering) degree in Mechanical Engineering with distinction (in 1970) from NIT Rourkela. Professor Acharya has about 32 years of diversified experience - twenty-seven years of teaching and research experience at IIT Kharagpur, and five years of experience in academic administration as Vice-Chancellor, Biju Patnaik University of Technology, Rourkela, and as Chairman of the All India Council of Technical Education.

== Recognition ==
- The Chief Minister of Odisha conferred him with the Think Odisha Leadership Award in 2010, jointly with the former Vice-Chancellor of the Odisha University of Agriculture and Technology, Baidyanath Misra, for their contributions in the field of education.

== Controversies ==
- An undergraduate student at the Department of Electrical Engineering died during Acharya's tenure after a head injury was not tended to immediately, primarily due to the lack of medical facilities in the campus hospital and Kharagpur. Students staged a huge protest and Acharya's residence was vandalized, blaming the director and the hospital administration of negligence. Acharya resigned shortly afterwards. However, later investigations established that he was not involved in the incident and had no knowledge of it, and was cleared of any responsibility.
