= Partha Pratim Chakrabarti =

Professor at IIT Kharagpur

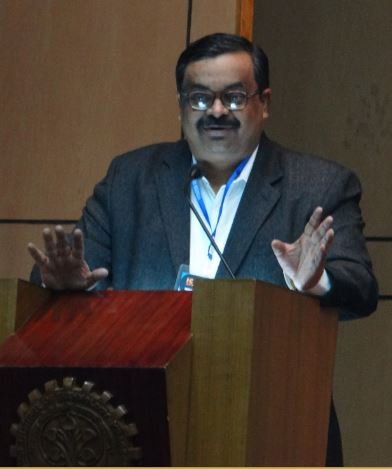

Professor at Indian Institute of Technology Kharagpur
- In office 1988–2027

Director IIT Kharagpur
- In office 27 July 2013 – 01 July 2019
- Preceded by: Damodar Acharya
- Succeeded by: Virendra Kumar Tewari

Mentor Director at IIIT Kalyani
- In office 2017–2019

Personal details
- Born: 1962 (age 63–64)
- Education: Indian Institute of Technology Kharagpur
- Profession: Professor; Author; Consultant
- Known for: Artificial Intelligence, CAD for VLSI & Embedded Systems
- Awards: Shanti Swarup Bhatnagar Prize
- Website: Official website Institute website
- Scientific career
- Fields: Computer science and engineering

Partha Pratim Chakrabarti (Chakraborty) (born 1962) is an Indian computer scientist. He is a distinguished professor and the former director of IIT Kharagpur. Dr. Chakrabarti has made pioneering research contributions and solved a number of open problems. His work has been incorporated in standard text books as well as industry level tools of major international companies. He has published more than 200 papers in international journals and conferences and supervised two dozen PhD students. He is also an honorary awardee of Shanti Swarup Bhatnagar Prize for Science and Technology, the highest science award in India, for the engineering category in 2000.

== Education ==
He did his schooling from St.Patrick's Higher Secondary School, Asansol. Following this, he completed his B.Tech in 1985 and PhD in 1988 from the Department of Computer Science & Engineering, Indian Institute of Technology Kharagpur. He joined the same department as a faculty member in 1988 and is currently a professor.

== Awards and honours ==
- President of India Gold Medal (1985)
- INSA Young Scientist Award (1991)
- INAE Young Engineer Award (1994)
- Anil K Bose Award (1995)
- Swarnajayanti Fellowship (1998)
- Shanti Swarup Bhatnagar Prize (2000)
- INAE Viswesvarya Chair Professor (2007)
- Rotary Award for Science & Technology (2010)
- S Ramanujam Memorial Lecture of IE (2012)
- J C Bose Fellowship (2013)

== Academic career ==
He was the professor-in-charge of the state of the art VLSI Design Laboratory which he helped set up and has been the Dean of Sponsored Research and Industrial Consultancy at IIT Kharagpur and head of the Advanced Technology Development Centre. He was also the co-director of the strategic General Motors-IIT Kharagpur Collaborative Research Laboratory on Electronics, Control and Software. He pioneered the development of the Incubation Programme at IIT Kharagpur. His areas of interest include Artificial Intelligence (AI), Formal Methods, CAD for VLSI & Embedded Systems, Fault Tolerance and Algorithm Design.

He has worked closely with the government as well as industry on various problems and has led and completed large projects and programmes at national and international levels. The companies he has worked with include DST, CSIR, IGSTC, Volkswagen Foundation, National Semiconductor Corporation, Sun Microsystems, Intel Corporation, Synopsys, General Motors, Xerox, etc. He is a teacher who has graduated a large number of students.

Prof. Chakrabarti is well-known for his teaching and supervision skills. His notable students include Pallab Dasgupta and Aritra Hazra who also joined IIT Kharagpur to serve the nation.

Dr Chakrabarti received the President of India Gold Medal (1985), the INSA Young Scientist Award (1991), Anil K Bose Award (1995), INAE Young Engineer's Award (1997) and the Swarnajayanti Fellowship (1997–98), Shanti Swarup Bhatnagar Prize (2000), INAE Visweswarya Chair Professorship (2007–9), J. C. Bose National Fellowship (2013) and many other awards. He has been elected a Fellow of the Indian National Science Academy, New Delhi and the Indian Academy of Science, Bangalore, Indian National Academy of Engineering and the West Bengal Academy of Science & Technology.

He was appointed director of IIT Kharagpur on 27 July 2013 following official clearance of allegations that he had been involved in the Coalnet scam (not to be confused with Indian coal allocation scam a.k.a. Coalgate scam).

Chakraborti was one of the three IIT professors who had been named by the Central Bureau of Investigation in the Coalnet scam in which work given to institute was outsourced. The CBI had recommended a minor penalty against Chakraborti and more serious penalties for his colleagues, A. K. Bhowmick and R. N. Banerjee. The IIT Kharagpur Board of Governors (BOG) gave Chakrabarti a clean chit on 23 March 2013.

== Career ==
The chairman of the board of governors has been informed about the decision of Human Development Ministry that Professor Chakraborti be given the appointment, sources said. The members and a large number of alumni of IIT Kharagpur took a protest march on July 20 to demand appointment of Professor Chakraborti as the director. Union Human Development Ministry has cleared the appointment of Professor Chakraborti as director of Indian Institute of Technology Kharagpur.

He currently serves as the Principal Advisor at The Chatterjee Group Centres for Research and Education in Science and Technology (TCG CREST).

== See also ==
- Alumni Cell, IIT Kharagpur
