= College of Basic Science and Humanities, Bhubaneswar =

Indian college

- Type: Education and Research Institution
- Established: 1962
- Affiliations: OUAT
- Director: Dr.Chandramani Khanda
- Location: Bhubaneswar, Odisha, India
- Website: www.ouat.nic.in/collegeofbasicscience

College of Basic Science and Humanities, Bhubaneswar is a constituent college of Orissa University of Agriculture and Technology (OUAT). Situated in capital city of Odisha, the college provides education in science stream to +2 science (Intermediate), graduate (B.Sc.), postgraduate (M.Sc.) as well as Ph.D.

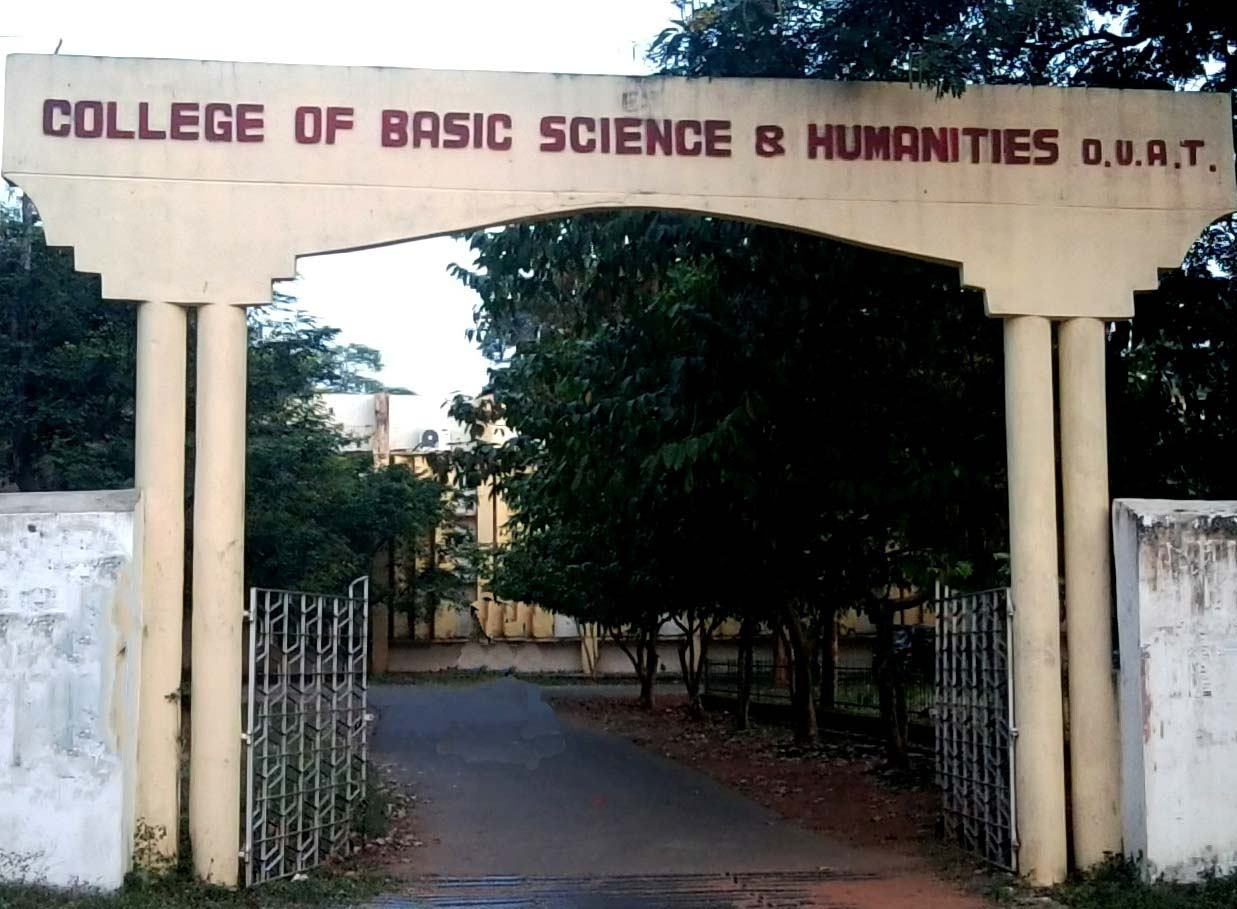
COLLEGE OLD GATE

== Objective / Purpose of the public Authority ==
To offer +2 Science Courses at higher secondary level and supporting pre-requisite courses to the students of other constituent colleges of OUAT. Besides to offer three year full-time degree courses in Science courses. From the session 2014–15, Post Graduate and Ph.D. courses in different disciplines of Sciences were also introduced.

== Departments and faculties ==
The college has the following Departments: Mathematics, Physics, Chemistry, Botany, Zoology, Microbiology (BScand Msc.), Biotechnology, Computer Science and Information Technology (IT), Electronics, odia, and English.

The college have many eminent faculties. Among the notable names, J. B. S. Haldane is at the top of the list. Eventually, many senior faculties trained from various national institutes have been taught in the college. For example, Prof. Netaji Upadhaya (PhD from BHU, Varanasi), Prof. Ashis Mohanty (MPhil from Delhi University) had given their best for the upliftment of the college. Currently, many senior faculties such as Prof. CSK Mishra (heading the college as Director) and Prof. Nandita Swain are immensely guiding the college. Many youngsters trained internationally, such as Dr. Biswaranjan Paital (Utkal, University, BHU, Varanasi, Indian Institute of Science, Bangalore, UiTM, Selangor), Dr. Himansu Sahoo (PhD from IIT, post doc from USA), Dr Nigam Parida (PhD from Indian Institute of Science), Dr. Chhatrapti Parida (NIT, Rourkela) are actively maintaining the teaching learning environment via active teaching, research and extension. Dr. Biswaranjan Paital from Zoology Department has been continuously listed for the fourth time (2021, 2022, 2023 and 2024) among the top 2% scientists of the world as ranked and published by the Stanford University, USA and Elsevier, respectively, in 2024. Many other young faculties like Dr. Rojalin Patanaik, Dr Debasis Dash(An odia actor and professor), Dr. Debiprasad Samantroy and Dr. Himansulal Nayak are the assets for the college. Altogether, the team contribution leads the college to be the 2nd most preferred college by the students in the state to peruse UG and PG.

== Admission ==
- +2 science: admission over 384 seats through the E-admission by DHE
- B Sc.: admission over 225 seats through the E-admission by Directorate of Higher Education, Govt. of Odisha.
- PG: conducted by SSB through common PG entrance test (CPET).
- Ph.D.: By OUAT entrance examination.

The cut off for +2 science is 87%(approx) of 10th.And cut off for +3 science 80-70%(depends upon honours paper) of 12th/+2 science. PG admission depends upon the career marks (i.e. 10th,12th & +3 sc. percentage) and entrance marks.

- Admission starts after the publication of respective results, i.e. 10th result of Bse/cbse/icse board & 12th result of chse/cbse/icse board result publication
- +2 science: Examination is conducted by CHSE.
- +3 science: conducted by OUAT following Credit Based System of state government.
- PG: conducted by OUAT (Autonomy).
- Ph.D.: Conducted by OUAT following UGC pattern.
- The 1st year exam of +2 is conducted in college level.for 2nd year +2 the final exam is conducted by CHSE.And two more exam of 2nd year i.e. test exam and pretest exam is conducted by college authority. The +2 exam is of total 600 marks practical paper are distributed in 70(theory)+30(practical).& language paper is of 100 mark. The combinations available in the college is PCMB, PCMIT, PCMS, PCME.
- Similarly the +3 exam is conducted by university i.e. OUAT and internal exam is by college.
