= Soma Mondal =

Indian businesswoman

- Born: 1963 (age 62–63); Bhubaneswar, Odisha
- Occupation: Businessperson
- Known for: Member PESB, Ex-Chairperson of Steel Authority of India

Soma Mondal (born 1963) is an Indian businesswoman, who served as a Chairperson of Steel Authority of India from 1 January 2021 to 30 April 2023. She also served as a member of the Public Enterprises Selection Board (PESB) constituted by the Government of India from 1 May 2023 onwards for a period of three years. Smt. Soma Mondal has the distinction of not only being the first woman Functional Director of SAIL, but she was also the first woman chairman of the company. As a chairperson she was also the chief executive of the corporation. Post retirement from SAIL, Smt. Mondal is now a member of Public Enterprise Selection Board. Known as the "Queen of Steel" for her immense contributions to the industry, Soma Mondal has been included in the list of "World's 100 most powerful women" by Forbes in 2022 and 2023 (70th rank in 2023).

== Early life ==
Soma Mondal was born and grew up in a Bengali middle-class family in Bhubaneswar. Her father was an agricultural economist. She majored in Electrical Engineering from National Institute of Technology, Rourkela in 1984.

== Career ==
Mondal has over 35 years of experience in the metal industry. She commenced her career as a Graduate Engineer Trainee at NALCO and rose through the ranks to take over the mantle of Director (Commercial) at NALCO in the year 2014. Mondal joined SAIL in March 2017 as Director (Commercial). She took over as chairperson of the Maharatna PSU from Anil Kumar Chaudhary, who retired in December, 2020. During her tenure, in FY2022, SAIL for a first time crossed the revenue milestone of Rs 1 lakh crore, entering an elite club of Indian companies having a turnover above Rs 1 lakh crore.

Mondal is well known in the Aluminium Industry for her contribution in various Industry forums. In March 2021 she was elected as the chairperson of Standing Conference of Public Enterprises (SCOPE), the organization representing the Central Government Public Enterprises.

In 2023, Soma Mondal honored with 'CEO of the Year' at ETPrime Women Leadership Awards.
