= Prasant Mohapatra =

Indian-American computer scientist

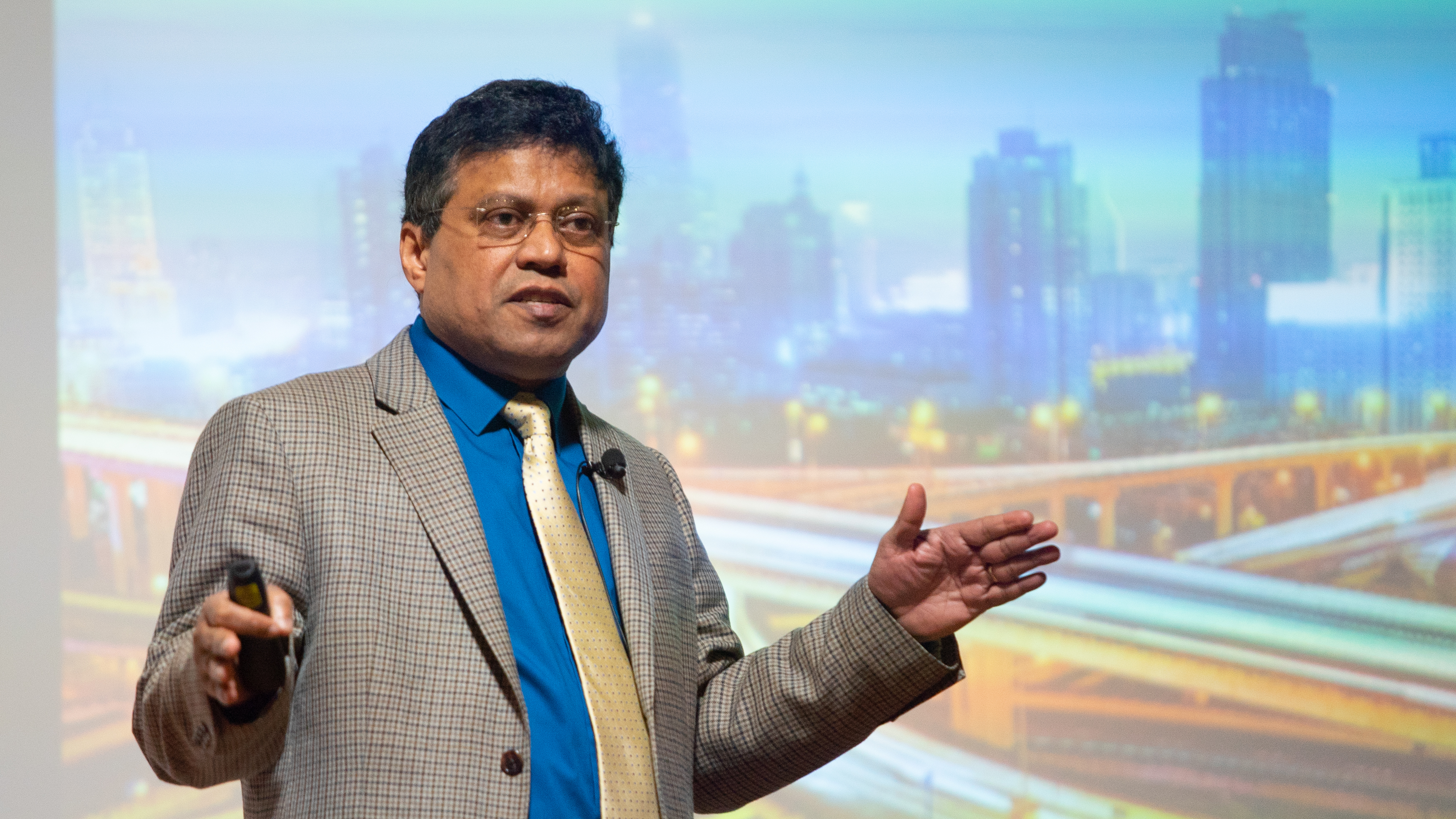
- Prasant Mohapatra talks about Impactful Research at a CITRIS Research Exchange Program held at UC Berkeley in 2019.
- Born: 1966 (age 59–60)
- Education: National Institute of Technology, Rourkela (BS); Pennsylvania State University (PhD)

Prasant Mohapatra is an Indian-American computer scientist. Mohapatra is currently the Provost of the University of South Florida. Previously, he was Vice Chancellor for Research at University of California Davis (UC-Davis).

== Education ==
He received a bachelor's degree in electrical engineering from National Institute of Technology, Rourkela (1987), and PhD degree from Penn State University (1993).

== Career ==
He was (in 2021) a Distinguished Professor in Computer Science and Vice Chancellor for Research at University of California Davis. His research is focused in the domain of wireless and mobile networks. He has researched how to quantify the quality of surveillance in a wireless sensor network. He is known for his contributions to the Quality of service (QoS) provisioning in computer networks.

He held the first Tim Bucher Family Endowed Chair in the department of computer science, UC-Davis from 2009 to 2013. He served as Chairman, Department of Computer Science, UC-Davis from 2007 to 2003. From 2013 to 2014 he served as Interim Vice-Provost and CIO. From 2014 to 2016 he served as an Associate Chancellor. From 2016 to 2018 he was Dean and Vice-Provost of Graduate Studies. In 2018, Mohapatra was appointed as the Vice Chancellor for Research.

He has been elected as Fellow of the IEEE (2010), and Fellow of the American Association for the Advancement of Science (AAAS; 2012). He has co-authored more than 350 papers in conferences and journals in the areas of wireless networks, mobile communications, cybersecurity, and Internet protocols. He also received the Distinguished Alumnus Award of the National Institute of Technology Rourkela (2015).

In January 2023, Mohapatra was named the Provost for the University of South Florida which oversees all areas of academic affairs. He started in March 2023.
