= Ashutosh Dutta =

Computer scientist, academic, author, and an IEEE Fellow

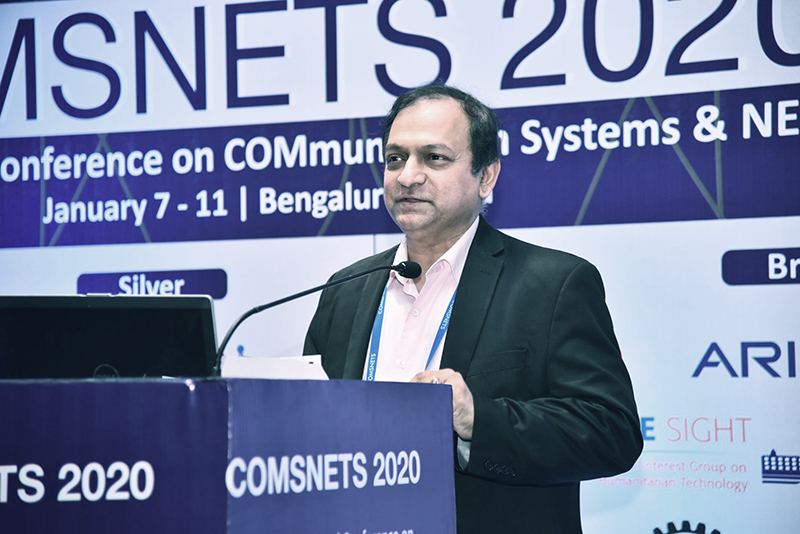
- Speaking at COMSNETS Bangalore, 2020
- Born: Cuttack, India
- Education: National Institute of Technology, Rourkela (B.S.); New Jersey Institute of Technology (M.S.); Columbia University (M.Phil, Ph.D.)
- Occupations: Computer scientist, academic and author
- Awards: IEEE Fellow; ACM Distinguished Member
- Scientific career
- Workplaces: Johns Hopkins University; Columbia University; Telcordia Technologies, Inc. NIKSUN; AT&T Labs; TATA Motors
- Doctoral advisor: Henning Schulzrinne
- Website: http://www.ashutoshdutta.org/

Ashutosh Dutta is an Indian-American computer scientist, engineer, academic, and IEEE leader. He is currently a Senior Scientist, 5G Chief Strategist, APL Sabbatical Fellow, and Director of the Doctor of Engineering Program at the Johns Hopkins University Whiting School of Engineering. He is the Chair of IEEE Industry Connection O-RAN Initiative and the Founding Co-Chair for the IEEE Future Networks Initiative. Dutta has co-authored over 150 articles, three book chapters, and has had more than 31 patents awarded.

== Education ==
After receiving a B.S. degree in Electrical Engineering from National Institute of Technology, Rourkela, India, Dutta immigrated to the United States, earning an M.S. in Computer Science from New Jersey Institute of Technology, and later an M.Phil. and Ph.D. in Electrical Engineering from Columbia University. He completed his Ph.D. thesis titled Systems Optimization for Mobility Management under the supervision of Henning Schulzrinne.

== Career ==
Dutta was first employed in 1985 as a Computer Engineer Tata Engineering and Locomotive Company, and worked there until 1987. He then served as Director of IT Operations at the Columbia University Fu Foundation School of Engineering and Applied Science for 8 years, before joining Telcordia Technologies Applied Research in 1997 as a Senior Scientist, where he directed research and development initiatives of VoIP and wireless technologies. During his tenure at Telcordia Technologies, he served as Principal Investigator for KDDI’s IMS project to design and build IMS/MMD network for next-generation networks, and also collaborated with ITSUMO QoS team involved in performance analysis of voice and data traffic in an 802.11b networking environment. As Co-PI, he supervised all operational phases of CERDEC project, and Toyota's mobile content delivery network in all IP wireless environments.

From 2010 until 2013, Dutta worked with NIKSUN Inc. as CTO Wireless and Executive Director of NIKSUN Innovation Center & Quality Assurance, and then held appointment as PMTS/LMTS/Director of AT&T Labs, in Middletown, New Jersey until 2018. Following these appointments, he was briefly associated with College of Staten Island at City University of New York as Adjunct Faculty in Electrical Engineering and Computer Science Department before joining the Johns Hopkins University Applied Physics Lab (JHU/APL) as Chief 5G Strategist, Lawrence R. Hafstad Sabbatical Fellow, Adjunct Faculty and ECE Chair for EP. In 2019, he became the faculty of Johns Hopkins University Information Security Institute and was appointed as program chair for Electrical and Computer Engineering for Engineering for Professionals in July 2020. Currently, he serves as Co-Chair of Service Oriented Network for Global ICT Standardization for India (GISFI), and Co-Director of CTIF-USA, which is an Industry-Academic Collaboration.

At IEEE, Dutta has been serving as a founding Co-Chair for the IEEE Future Networks Initiative since 2016, and as a Member-At-Large for IEEE Communications Society since 2020. He has also served as IEEE Distinguished Lecturer for IEEE Communications Society until 2020, the Director of Industry Outreach for IEEE Communications Society until 2019, and the general Co-Chair for the IEEE STEM conference for the last 12 years. Dutta has been selected as ACM Distinguished Member in 2021. He also became ACM Distinguished Speaker in 2020, and Chair for ACM Baltimore Chapter in 2021.

== Research ==
Dutta's work is focused in computer communication, LTE networks, software-defined networking (SDN), wireless networking, Network Function Virtualization (NFV), 5G, and mobility management. He is also the co-author of a book entitled Mobility Protocols and Handover Optimization: Design, Evaluation and Application that has also been translated to Chinese language. Dutta serves as Editor-in-chief for Journal of Cyber Security and Mobility, Associate Technical Editor for IEEE Communications Magazine, and Associate Guest Editor for IEEE IOT Journal. Dutta is currently an IEEE Fellow for leadership in mobility management and security monitoring in mobile networks and is a Distinguished Member of Association for Computing Machinery (ACM),

=== Mobility management ===
In his study regarding mobility management, Dutta primarily focused session initiation protocol (SIP) based mobility in IPv6, highlighted the role of IPv6 Linux implementation in terms of delaying node movement, and explored how it affects the performance of real-time applications. He also studied Intra-Domain Mobility Management Protocol (IDMP) in the context of 4th generation (4G) mobile network, and presented a paging scheme under IDMP that has the ability to replicate the current cellular paging structure. Furthermore, he discussed mechanisms to incorporate paging support in IDMP and reduced the mobility-related signaling load on a mobile node. In 2002, he published a paper based on the significance of flexible multi-media, and its role in making Internet Radio and TV networks more attractive for the roaming users. He further proposed a streaming network called MarconiNet based on standard IETF protocols such as SAP, SIP and SDP for signaling, RTP/RTCP for media delivery and feedback control and RTSP for stream control. He is also the one to introduce methods and systems regarding generalized mobility solution using a dynamic tunneling agent.

=== Wireless networking ===
Dutta invented a patent and presented "system and method for receiving over a network a broadcast from a broadcast source". He also discovered method for network discovery of a mobile device to use at least one of a plurality of access networks within an IP network. In 2003, he conducted an experimental study to evaluate wireless local area network (WLAN) voice performance and capacity, and offered a practical investigation into the ability of 802.11b MAC layer in terms of supporting simultaneous voice and data. While focusing his study on the media independent handover, he discussed how the IEEE 802.21 standard framework and services are addressing the challenges of seamless mobility for multi-interface devices. . As a computer science expert, he has been affiliated with Internet Real-Time Lab (IRT), and Distributed Computing & Communications (DCC) Laboratory of Columbia University, and works on wireless networking, LTE networks, software-defined networking (SDN), computer communication, Network Function Virtualization (NFV), 5G, Network Security, and mobility management.

== Awards and honors ==
- 2000 - Recognition award for serving as a Publicity Co-Chair, Mobicom
- Several Recognition awards from the Vice-President of Telcordia Research Labs
- 2005 - Leadership Award, IEEE-PCJ Section
- 6 time recipient of DARPA Merit Award for Technical Excellence for Integrated Mobility Management in the Air-Borne Communication Node project
- 2000 & 2002 - CEO awards, Telcordia Technologies
- 2009 - MGA Leadership Award, IEEE
- 2010 - Professional Leadership Award, IEEE-USA
- 2011 - Regional Leadership Award, IEEE-USA
- 2011 - IEEE Region 1 award for outstanding section leadership for Princeton/Central Jersey Section
- 2013 - Security Team Award, AT&T Chief Security Office (CSO)
- 2016 - 2020 - Distinguished Lecturer, IEEE Communications Society
- 2020 – 2022 - Distinguished Speaker, ACM
- 2020 - Distinguished Alumnus Award, NIT Rourkela
- 2021 - ACM Distinguished Member
- 2022 - IEEE North American Region Exceptional Service Award
- 2022 - IEEE USA George F. McClure Citation of Honor
- 2023 - Inducted into IEEE Eta Kappa Nu (HKN) Honor Society
- 2025 - Inducted into the IPv6 Forum's Hall of Fame
- 2025 - Asia-Pacific Artificial Intelligence Association Fellow
- 2025 - Selected for the IEEE ComSoc/KICS Exemplary Global Service Award
- 2026 - IEEE Region 2 Outstanding Engineering Educator Award
- 2026 - IEEE Distinguished Chapter Leadership Award
- 2026 - IEEE Standards Medallion Award

== Bibliography ==
=== Books ===
- Mobility Protocols and Handover Optimization: Design, Evaluation and Application (2014) ISBN 9780470740583

=== Selected articles ===
- A. Dutta and E. Hammad, "5G Security Challenges and Opportunities: A System Approach," 2020 IEEE 3rd 5G World Forum (5GWF), 2020, pp. 109-114, doi: 10.1109/5GWF49715.2020.9221122.
- R. Pepito and A. Dutta, "Open Source 5G Security Testbed for Edge Computing," 2021 IEEE 4th 5G World Forum (5GWF), 2021, pp. 388-393, doi: 10.1109/5GWF52925.2021.00075.
- A. Dutta, B. Lyles and H. Schulzrinne, "A formal approach to mobility modeling," 2011 Third International Conference on Communication Systems and Networks (COMSNETS 2011), 2011, pp. 1–10, doi: 10.1109/COMSNETS.2011.5716488.
- Misra, A., Das, S., Dutta, A., McAuley, A., & Das, S. K. (2002). IDMP-based fast handoffs and paging in IP-based 4G mobile networks. IEEE Communications Magazine, 40(3), 138-145.
- Nakajima, N., Dutta, A., Das, S., & Schulzrinne, H. (2003, May). Handoff delay analysis and measurement for SIP based mobility in IPv6. In IEEE International Conference on Communications, 2003. ICC'03. (Vol. 2, pp. 1085–1089). IEEE.
- Das, S., Misra, A., McAuley, A., Dutta, A., Agrawal, P., & Das, S. (2006). U.S. Patent No. 6,992,994. Washington, DC: U.S. Patent and Trademark Office.
- Baba, S., Chen, J. C., Dutta, A., Shobatake, Y., & Vakil, F. (2007). U.S. Patent No. 7,184,418. Washington, DC: U.S. Patent and Trademark Office.
- Dutta, A., Schulzrinne, H., & Yemini, Y. (2007). U.S. Patent No. 7,296,091. Washington, DC: U.S. Patent and Trademark Office.
- Dutta, A., Famolari, D., Das, S., Ohba, Y., Fajardo, V., Taniuchi, K., ... & Schulzrinne, H. (2008). Media-independent pre-authentication supporting secure interdomain handover optimization. IEEE Wireless Communications, 15(2), 55-64.
- Taniuchi, K., Ohba, Y., Fajardo, V., Das, S., Tauil, M., Cheng, Y. H., ... & Famolari, D. (2009). IEEE 802.21: Media independent handover: Features, applicability, and realization. IEEE Communications Magazine, 47(1), 112-120.
- Taniuchi, K., Ohba, Y., Madhani, S., Das, S., & Dutta, A. (2014). U.S. Patent No. 8,717,931. Washington, DC: U.S. Patent and Trademark Office.
