= Nabakrushna Choudhury Centre for Development Studies =

Think tank in India

Nabakrushna Choudhury Centre for Development Studies (NCDS)
- Parent institution: Indian Council of Social Science Research
- Founder: Baidyanath Misra
- Established: 1987; 39 years ago
- Focus: Economics, Sociology and Social Anthropology
- Chair: Anu Garg
- Director: Dr. Yeddula Vijay
- Location: Bhubaneswar, Odisha, India
- Website: https://ncds.nic.in/

The Nabakrushna Choudhury Centre for Development Studies is a public policy think-tank of the state of Odisha. It conducts research in the disciplines of Economics, Sociology and Social Anthropology. It is jointly funded by the Government of India and the Government of Odisha. It assists the Odisha Government in research, planning, and training.
