= College of Agricultural Engineering & Technology, Bhubaneswar =

College of Orissa University of Agriculture and Technology

Coordinates: 20.264512°N 85.81202°E

College of Agricultural Engg.and Technology, Bhubaneswar
- Type: Public
- Established: 1966
- Affiliations: OUAT, ICAR
- Dean: Dr. A.P. Sahoo
- Students: Undergraduate and Graduate
- Location: Bhubaneshwar, Odisha, India
- Campus: Urban
- Acronym: CAET
- Website: www.caet.ac.in

College of Agricultural Engineering and Technology is one of the constituent colleges of Orissa University of Agriculture and Technology established in 1966. It is imparting education, research and extension in the field of Agricultural Engineering.

== Academics ==
=== Undergraduate ===
Every year 64 students are admitted to B.Tech (Agriculture Engineering) course on the basis of their performance and ranking in the Common Entrance Test conducted by OUAT. The undergraduate course includes subjects on basic sciences like Physics, Mathematics, Chemistry, English, Basic Engineering Courses, Computer Science and core engineering courses like Farm Machinery & Power, Soil & Water Conservation Engineering, Agricultural Processing & Food Engineering, Agricultural Structure, Civil & Environmental Engineering and Mechanical & Electrical Engineering etc.

=== Postgraduate ===
The college offers a two-year full-time postgraduate program leading to M.Tech in Farm machinery and Power (FMP), Soil and Water Conservation Engineering (SWCE) and Agricultural Processing and Food Engineering (APFE).

=== Doctorate ===
The college is offering 3 years course credit Ph.D. programme in three departments namely Department of Farm Machinery and Power, Department of Soil and Water Conservation Engineering and Department of Agricultural Processing and Food Engineering.

== Departments ==
The college has five separate departments fulfilling the needs of both undergraduate and graduate students covering all possible aspects and specialisations of Agricultural Engineering. They are:

- Department of Farm Machinery & Power (FMP)
- Department of Soil and Water Conservation Engineering (SWCE)
- Department of Agricultural Processing and Food Engineering (APFE)
- Department of Mechanical and Electrical Engineering (MEE)
- Department of Agricultural Structure Civil and Environmental Engineering (ASCEE)

== Infrastructure ==
CAET has its own academic and administrative units in the main campus of OUAT at Bhubaneswar. It has all the infrastructure facilities to cater the need of all level of students and researchers. It has its own library and has access to OUAT central library with more than 300 thousand books and subscription to more than 250 journals. It also has e-library facility for students with more than 100 computers on LAN with internet access.

The college is equipped with modern laboratory facilities supporting agricultural, food, and mechanical engineering disciplines. The college has laboratories for improved implement design, farm machinery, farm power, soil and water conservation engineering, farm structures, soil mechanics, hydraulics, irrigation equipment, agricultural processing, mechanical engineering, I.C. Engine, Ergonomics and Safety, food processing, food analysis laboratory, food engineering laboratory, and food technology laboratory.

The college has a computer center. The computer center has a group of network micros (PCs, PC/ATs) equipped with high-speed printers, scanners & plotters and has dedicated VSAT system for 24-hour internet and e-mail facility. Computer laboratories for PG students are loaded with AUTOCAD and ProE for their research work. The main objectives of the computer center are to impart computer knowledge among students and faculties and to obtain statistical, scientific and simulation packages through national and international linkages to cater the educational needs of Agricultural Engineering sector.

The college has an auditorium with a seating capacity of more than 300. It also has a big centrally air-conditioned conference hall with all kind of modern audio-visual tools and a computer. The college provides separate hostels to boys and girls. All the rooms are equipped with internet facility for the use of students.

It also has a fully functional training and placement unit to help students to decide on their training and career placement.
