= Center for Post-Graduate Studies, Bhubaneswar =

The Centre for Post-Graduate Studies (CPGS) is functioning under Orissa University of Agriculture and Technology in Odisha, India. It offers four courses, MBA in Agribusiness Management (ABM), Master in Bioinformatics, Master in Computer Application (MCA) and Master of Science in Microbiology.

Orissa University of Agriculture and Technology (OUAT) Bhubaneswar, India is a multi faculty technical university.

== Description ==
The campus is located near Siripur Square, Bhubaneswar, in front of the University Administrative building. It has three spacious buildings with an adequate number of classrooms, laboratories, library and seminar rooms accessible to all three departments.

== History ==
The college came into existence in 1998 through an initiative of OUAT.

== See also ==
- OUAT homepage
- Dept. of Computer Application homepage
- Bioinformatics Alumni Association (BIOALUMNAS) homepage
