= College of Forestry, Bhubaneswar =

Coordinates: 20.263298°N 85.812095°E

The College of Forestry, OUAT Bhubaneswar is an institution providing forestry education in the state of Odisha. Previously it was a department under college of agriculture, OUAT; when it started providing 1st Bsc (forestry) degree in India in 1987. The department became a college in 2010.

== History ==
It was established as a department in College of Agriculture during the year 1987. Subsequently, it was upgraded to the College of Forestry in the year 2010 inaugurated by Sj. Naveen Patnaik, Hon’ble Chief Minister of Odisha.

== Education ==
The college provides 4 year bachelor's degree in BSc forestry which is allied to agriculture. According to ICAR BSc forestry syllabus covers 47.5% of agriculture with forestry syllabus. The college also provides MSc degree in 5 disciplines of forestry. This college has 50% reservation for Forest Range Officer as mentioned under Odisha Public Service Commission (OPSC) guidelines.
