= Virendra Kumar Tewari =

Professor at IIT Kharagpur

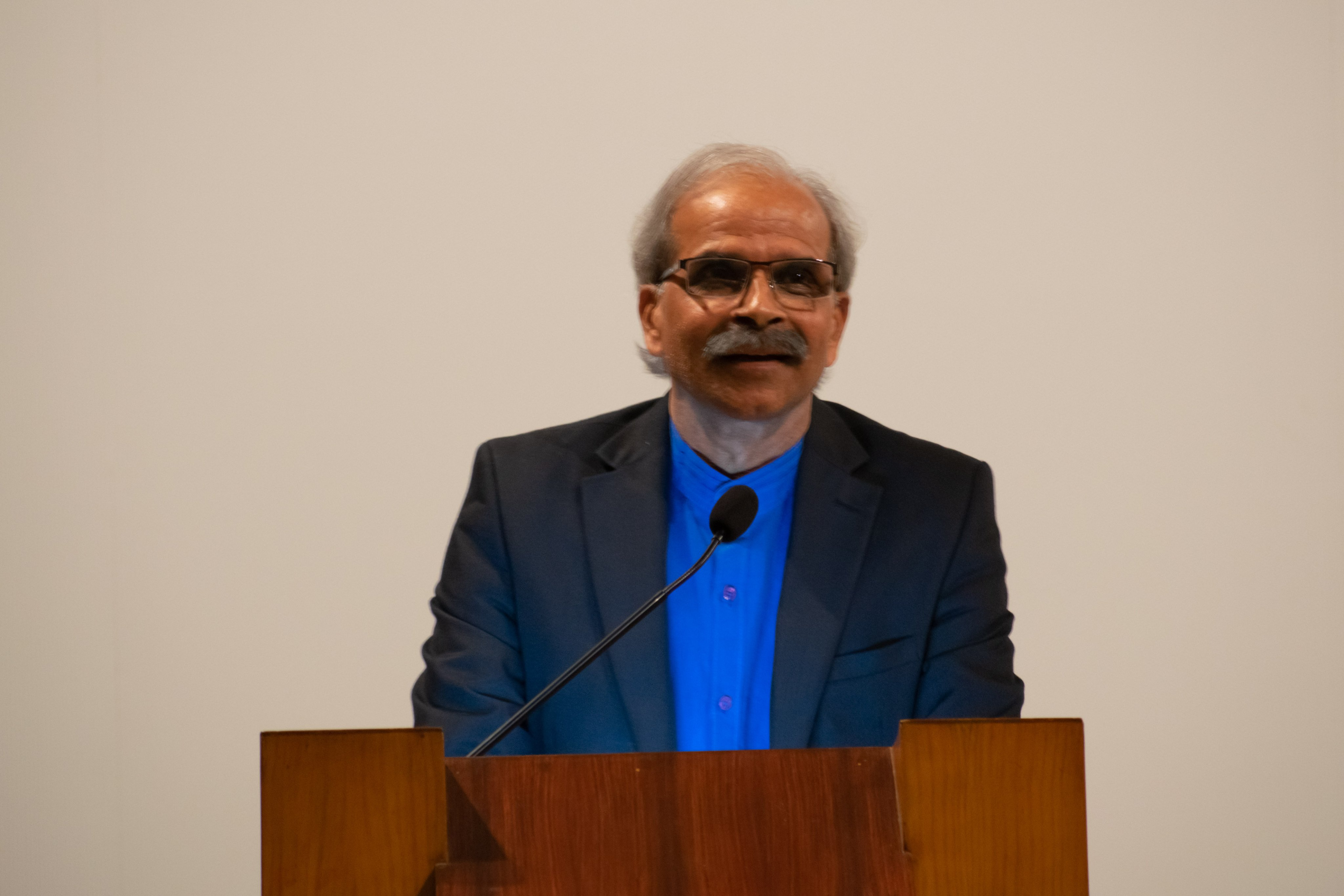

Director at Indian Institute of Technology Kharagpur
- In office 31 December 2019 – 31 December 2024
- Preceded by: Partha Pratim Chakraborty
- Succeeded by: Amit Patra (additional charge)

Professor at Indian Institute of Technology Kharagpur
- In office 1982–2024

Personal details
- Born: 1 January 1955 (age 71) Uttar Pradesh, India
- Education: Indian Institute of Technology Kharagpur
- Profession: Professor; Author; Consultant
- Known for: Farm Machinery & Power, Ergonomics & Safety and Precision agriculture
- Website: Official website

Virendra Kumar Tewari (born 1 January 1955) is an agricultural engineer, retired Professor, and former Director at the Indian Institute of Technology (IIT) Kharagpur. He is known for his work in farm machinery and power, ergonomics and safety, and precision agriculture. Tewari has been associated with IIT Kharagpur for over 45 years and has made significant contributions to his field, with over 150 research papers published in national and international peer-reviewed journals. He has received several awards and honours for his work, and he is a fellow of the Indian Society of Agricultural Engineers, Institution of Engineers (India) and the National Academy of Agricultural Sciences. He also held additional responsibility as the interim director at IIT Bhubaneswar.

He has received several awards and honors for his work, including the Jawahar Lal Nehru Award, NRDC Republic Day Invention Award, ISAE R. K. Jain Memorial Award, ISAE Commendation Medal, and ISAE Fellow Award. In 2021, he was honoured with the Special Recognition of the Year Award by Agriculture Today Group for his exemplary contribution to the growth and development of agricultural mechanization in India.

His research interest in precision agriculture is well recognized. As the Director and Professor of Agricultural and Food Engineering at IIT Kharagpur, he has been actively involved in the study of precision agriculture. This involves the use of advanced technologies to optimize crop yields and economic returns while minimizing environmental impact.

== Awards and honors ==
- Jawahar Lal Nehru Award (1986)
- NRDC Republic Day Invention Award (1987)
- ISAE R. K. Jain Memorial Award (1994)
- ISAE Commendation Medal (1996)
- ISAE Fellow Award (2006)

== Selected bibliography ==
=== Selected patents ===
- Mechanical loading-unloading and uniform spreading system for tea leaf on withering trough
- Integrated Composite Anthropometer

=== Books ===
- Power Machinery Systems and Ergonomics, Safety and Health. Anamaya Publishers. 2005. ISBN 978-81-88342-50-1.
- Food and Bio Process Engineering. Anamaya Publishers. 2005. ISBN 978-81-88342-51-8.

=== Selected articles ===
- Raikwar, Satyam; Tewari, V.K.; Mukhopadhyay, S.; Verma, Cmde. R.B.; Sreenivasulu Rao, M. (June 2015). "Simulation of components of a power shuttle transmission system for an agricultural tractor". Computers and Electronics in Agriculture. 114: 114–124. doi:10.1016/j.compag.2015.03.006.
- Mehta, C.R.; Tewari, V.K. (December 2010). "Damping characteristics of seat cushion materials for tractor ride comfort". Journal of Terramechanics. 47 (6): 401–406. doi:10.1016/j.jterra.2009.11.001.
