= Odisha University of Agriculture and Technology =

Public agricultural university in Odisha, India

Coordinates: 20.264512°N 85.81202°E

- ଓଡ଼ିଶା କୃଷି ଓ ବୈଷୟିକ ବିଶ୍ଵବିଦ୍ୟାଳୟ
- Type: Public
- Established: 1962; 64 years ago
- Affiliations: ICAR, UGC, VCI, AICTE, AIU, NAAC
- Chancellor: Governor of Odisha
- Vice-Chancellor: Dr. Pravat Kumar Roul
- Location: Bhubaneshwar, Odisha, India
- Campus: Urban
- Website: ouat.ac.in

Odisha University of Agriculture and Technology (OUAT) was established in Bhubaneswar, Odisha, India in 1962 by then Chief Minister Shri Biju Patnaik. It is the second oldest agricultural university in the country. It is dedicated to agriculture-related research, extension and education. The university has 11 constituent colleges and separate wings for research, extension services and planning, monitoring & evaluation, etc.

== Campuses ==
OUAT has four academic campuses across Odisha; one each at Bhubaneswar, Chiplima (Sambalpur), Rangeilunda (Brahmapur) and Bhawanipatna (built in 2009). The main academic and administrative unit is at the heart of Bhubaneswar (Latitude : 20° 15'N, Longitude : 85° 52' E), the capital city of Odisha. It has its jurisdiction over entire state of Orissa.

== Education ==
The university aims to provide quality education in agricultural science and technology. The university offers the following degrees: B.Sc. (agriculture), M.Sc. (agriculture), B.Sc. (forestry), B.V.Sc. & A.H., M.V.Sc., B.Tech., M.Tech., B.Sc. (Home.Sc.), B.F.Sc., M.F.Sc.,+2 Science, B.Sc. (Pass & Hons), MBA (Agribusiness Management), MCA., M.Sc.and bsc (Microbiology), M.Sc. (Bioinformatics), B.Sc.and M.Sc. (Mathematics, Physics, Chemistry, Botany and Zoology) and Ph.D. in some of the selected branches such as Ph.D. in Mathematics, Physics, Zoology, Botany and Microbiology.

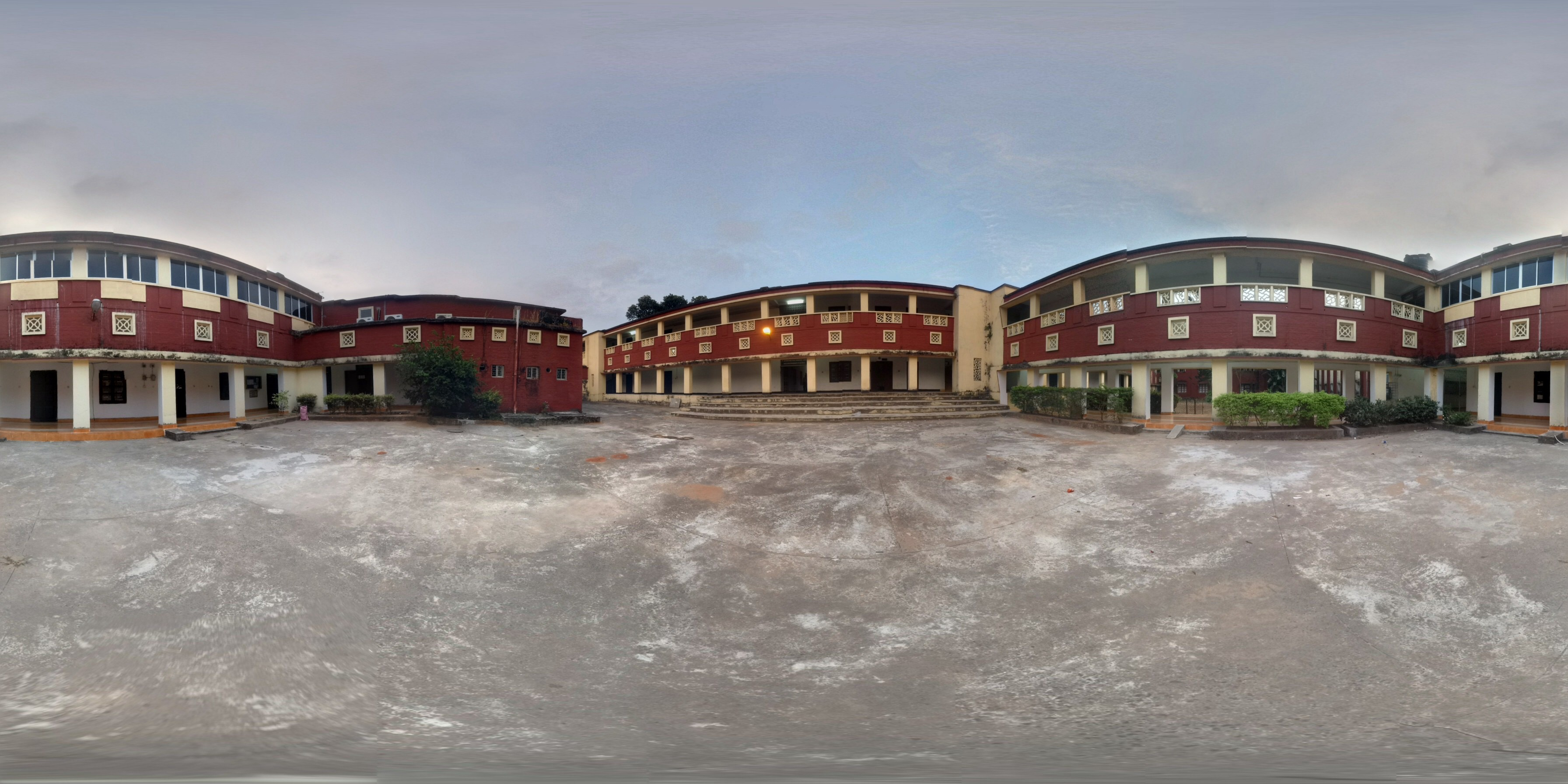
360° photo sphere of OUAT

At the pace of the decades, the university has grown with eight colleges and one Centre for Post-Graduate studies with an annual intake capacity of 1342 students. The latest college was the College of Horticulture in Chipilima. A ninth college is scheduled to open in Bhawanipatna in 2010. The colleges are:

- College of Agriculture, Bhubaneswar
- College of Agriculture, Chiplima, Sambalpur
- College of Agriculture, Bhawanipatna (started in 2009)
- College of Forestry, Bhubaneswar (started in 2010)
- College of Horticulture, Chipilima, Sambalpur
- College of Veterinary Science & Animal Husbandry, Bhubaneswar
- College of Agricultural Engineering & Technology (CAET), Bhubaneswar
- College of Fisheries, Rangeilunda, Brahmapur
- College of Basic Science and Humanities Bhubaneswar
- College of Home Science, Bhubaneswar
- Center for Post-Graduate Studies, Bhubaneswar

(College of Engineering and Technology, Bhubaneswar was a constituent college from 1981 to 2002, it has been curved to separate technical university for science & engineering research-based university by Government of Odisha, known as Odisha University of Technology and Research)

Efforts were successful to upgrade the Department of Forestry to a College of Forestry in Bhubaneswar and this change was done on 8 June 2010.

The university has become the Alumnae of 12,934 graduates, 3,883 post-graduates, and 213 Ph.D.s in agriculture and allied disciplines by the end of 2005–06. Thus, the university could meet the bulk need of the trained manpower of the state in agriculture and allied sectors.

== Vice-Chancellors ==
1. Prof. M.C. Pradhan (29 September 1962 to 28 September 1965)
2. Prof. (Dr.) K. Ramiah (1 November 1965 to 15 March 1968)
3. Prof. (Dr.) B. Samantarai (16 March 1968 to 5 June 1971)
4. Prof. (Dr.) Ch. N. Nanda (6 June 1971 to 16 July 1973)
5. Prof. J. Das ( 17 July 1973 to 14 October 1976)
6. Prof. (Dr.) K. Kanungo (15 October 1976 to 31 July 1981)
7. Prof. (Dr.) Baidyanath Misra (1 August 1981 to 28 March 1985)
8. Prof. K. Rammurthy (5 April 1985 to 22 April 1988)
9. Prof. (Dr.) N. Pattnaik (24 April 1988 to 4 February 1992)
10. Prof. (Dr.) I. C. Mahapatra (5 February 1992 to 17 August 1994)
11. Prof. (Dr.) K. Pradhan (5 September 1994 to 5 September 1997)
12. Prof. R. K. Bhujabala (8 October 1997 to 31 October 2000)
13. Prof. Sahadev Sahoo (1 November 2000 to 31 October 2003)
14. Prof. (Dr.) B. Senapati (12 December 2003 to 18 December 2006)
15. Prof. D. P. Ray (18 December 2006 to 17 December 2012)
16. Prof. M. Kar (17 March 2013 to 28 March 2016)
17. Prof. S. Pasupalak (28 March 2016 to 21 March 2019)
18. Prof. (Dr.) Pawan Kumar Agrawal (14 May 2019 – present)
19. Prof. (Dr.) Pravat Kumar Roul ( 9 September 2022 – present)

== Research and extension ==
The university has strengthened its research and extension base by establishing eight Zonal Research Stations, four Zonal Sub-stations, seven Commodity Research Stations and 13 Adaptive Research Stations spread over the state/ along with 48 All India Coordinated Research Projects. Also, more than 41 National Agricultural Technology Projects are in operation. A number of ad-hoc projects funded by different external agencies are also implemented in the university. Some of the eminent faculties such as Dr. Biswaranjan Paital, Dr. Himansu Sekhar Sahoo, Prof. Gyana Ranjan Rout have made the university proud by publishing their research in very high impact factor (IF 6–18) Journals. Notably, for the fourth time from 2021,Dr Paital is ranked among the top 2% of the scientists of the world as ranked by the Stanford University in USA and published by Elsevier.

The university has a separate Directorate of Extension Education which refines technologies and disseminates knowledge to the farming community through a network of 31 KVKs in all Districts of Odisha under different agro-climatic zones. It also provides feedback to the research system for finding a solution to the farmer's problems. Transfer of knowledge programmes are carried out through Krishi Vigyan Kendras (KVKs), University Extension Block Programme (UEBP), Information and Communication wing, Distance Education, Video Project, Agricultural Technology Information Centre (ATIC), Kissan Call Centre (KCC) and Odisha Gender Resources Centre (OGRC).

== Rankings ==
The NIRF (National Institutional Ranking Framework) ranked it 15th among Agriculture institutes in India in 2024.
