= Odisha University of Technology and Research =

Public unitary technical university in Odisha, India

Coordinates: 20.276°N 85.777°E

- Former names: College of Engineering and Technology
- Type: Public technical university
- Established: 1981 as College; 2021 as University
- Academic affiliations: UGC
- Chancellor: Governor of Odisha
- Vice-Chancellor: Bibhuti Bhusan Biswal
- Location: Bhubaneswar, Odisha, India
- Campus: 100+ acres; Residential
- Website: outr.ac.in

Odisha University of Technology and Research (OUTR), formerly College of Engineering and Technology, Bhubaneswar (CETB), is a public unitary technical university under the state government of Odisha located in Bhubaneswar, the capital of Odisha, India. It was established in 1981, by Government of Orissa, as a constituent college of Odisha University of Agriculture and Technology. Students are admitted to the college through the Joint Entrance Examination (main) merit list of Government of India. The Institute is accredited by the National Board of Accreditation. The Government of Odisha has granted unitary university status.

== Academic departments ==
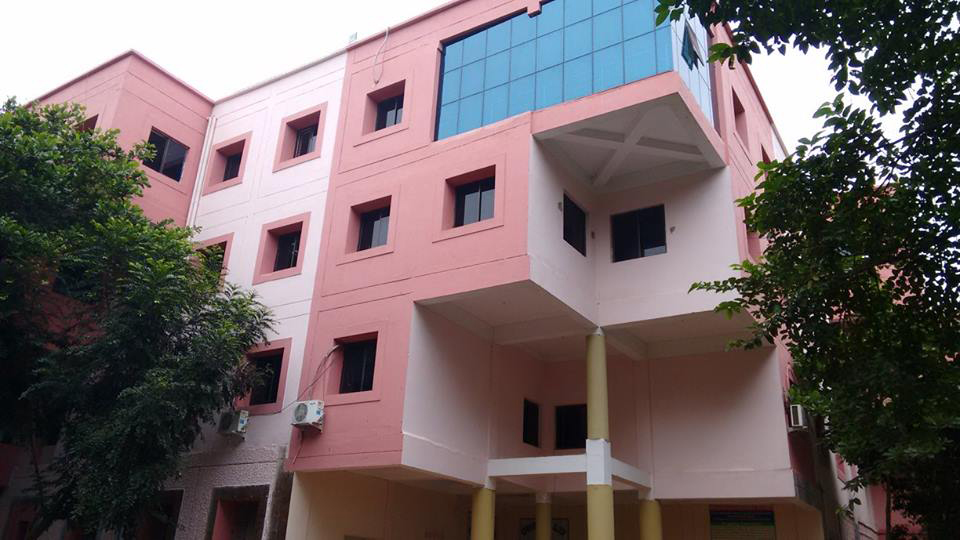
The main office building

OUTR is the third technical institution established by the Government of Odisha and has an annual intake of 1400 students. It has received accreditation from the National Board of Accreditation.

The institute currently has 18 departments:

- Architecture
- Biotechnology
- Business Administrations
- Chemistry
- Civil Engineering
- Computer Science Specialized in Artificial Intelligence and Machine Learning
- Computer Science and Engineering
- Electrical Engineering
- Electronics and Communication Engineering
- Electronics and Instrumentation Engineering
- Fashion & Apparel Technology
- Information Technology
- Mathematics & Humanities
- Mechanical Engineering
- Mechanical Engineering specialized in Artificial Intelligence and Robotics
- Physics
- Textile Engineering
- Urban and Regional Planning

OUTR is one of two Institutes in Odisha to participate in the TEQIP — II project run by the World Bank and the National Ministry of Human Resources Development. Under the program, the institute hosts the following centers of excellence:

- Centre for Micro Electronics
- Centre for Mechanics
- Centre for Nanobiotechnology
- Modrob project centre

OUTR was accredited with an "A" grade by National Assessment and Accreditation Council in January, 2017. Four UG programmes (Civil Engineering, Electrical Engineering, Instrumentation & Electronics Engineering and Mechanical Engineering) of CETB have been accredited by National Board of Accreditation (NBA) since July, 2016.

== Academic programs ==
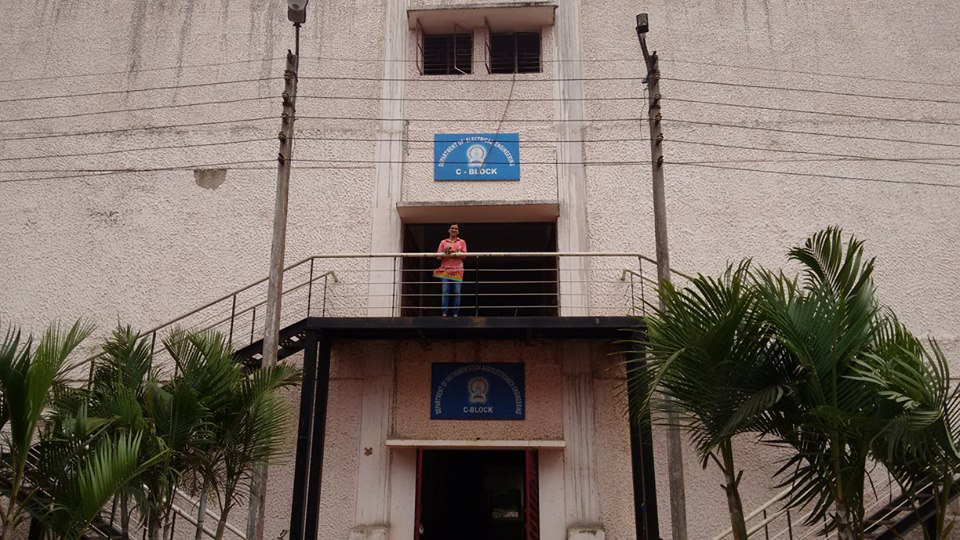
A view front side of the C-Block that houses departments including electrical engineering and instrumentation

A three-year B.Tech. degree for diploma holders as lateral entries is offered. All courses are full-time. In the 2014–15 academic year courses started including M.Tech. in every branch, and a 5-years integrated courses (integrated M.Sc.) along with a 2-years M.Sc. in applied physics, applied chemistry and mathematics and computing.

Each academic year consists of two semesters and a summer term. Education is organised around a credit system, which ensures continuous evaluation of a student's performance and provides flexibility to choose courses to suit the student's ability or convenience. Each course is assigned credits depending upon the class hours.

OUTR provides Bachelor of Technology degrees in 11 disciplines of engineering:

- Architecture
- Bachelor in Planning
- Biotechnology
- Civil Engineering
- Computer Science & Engineering
- Electrical Engineering
- Fashion & Apparel Technology
- Information Technology
- Instrumentation & Electronics Engineering
- Mechanical Engineering
- Textile Engineering

The Bachelor of Architecture degree is of five-year duration and the rest are of four-years duration. CETB/OUTR also offers a two-year Master of Computer Applications programme. as well as in Master of Business Administration. The typical enrolment is 60 to 120 for each of the programs. The CETB/OUTR conducts an M.Tech. program in 20 specializations including:

- Nanobiotechnology
- VLSI & Embedded Systems
- Mechanical System Design & Dynamics
- M.Tech in Textile Engg in Textile Chemical Processing
- Thermal Engineering
- Textile Chemical Processing
- Structural Engineering
- Industrial Engineering and Management
- Computer Science and Engineering
- Information Technology
- Urban and Regional Planning
- M. Arch. course

OUTR provides M.Sc. and Integrated M.Sc. in the following disciplines of science

• Applied Physics

• Applied Chemistry

• Mathematics and computing

Eight departments conduct Ph.D. programmes. The Ph.D. programs are the following:

- Biotechnology
- Civil Engineering
- Computer Science & Engineering
- Chemistry
- Electrical Engineering
- Electronics and Instrumentation Engineering
- Information Technology
- Mechanical Engineering
- Physics

== Admission process and examinations ==
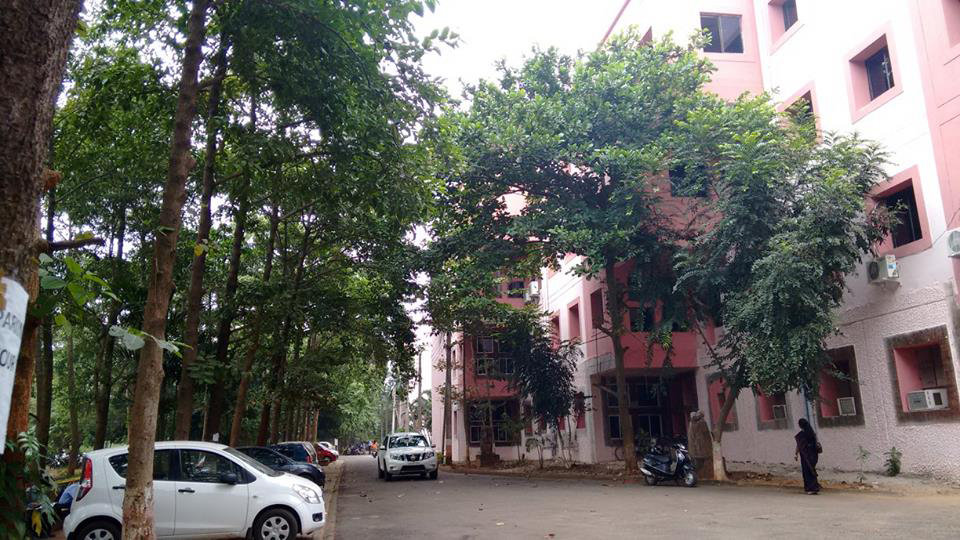
A view from the main office building

B.Tech. and MCA admission to undergraduate degrees is made through a Joint Entrance Examination conducted each year by the government of Odisha or Joint Entrance Examination (main) merit list of Government of India. Students are eligible to appear for examinations provided they attend a minimum of 75 per cent of their theory, practical, and sessional classes scheduled during the semester.

== Unitary university status and world class repute upgrade ==
The state government has allocated fund of rupees 1500 crore ($200 million) in the year 2022 for renovation to be spend per the designed Master Plan of the government & make it in par with IITs in terms quality education, research and offer a platform with academic program, research and entrepreneurship in sync with latest evolving technology around world. The main objective of the university will be to develop education, research and training in the fields of engineering, technology and information technology, act as a Centre for enhancing mutual cooperation and cooperation among teaching, research community and industries. Biju Patnaik University of Technology issued a no-objection certificate regarding the grant of unitary university status. The National Board of Accreditation team has visited the college to examine the college for a university status. As one of the first Government Institutes of Odisha, College of Engineering & Technology Bhubaneswar (CETB) has received the National Board of Accreditation. In May 2021, a memorandum was sent to Chief Minister of Odisha Naveen Patnaik by the CET Students' Union to take steps to declare CETB as a unitary university as Odisha University of Technology and Research, Bhubaneswar. The state Cabinet approved CET Bhubaneswar the unitary university status. The Odisha Assembly passed the Odisha University of Technology and Research Bill, 2021, upgrading the College of Engineering and Technology, Bhubaneswar (CETB) into a non-affiliating unitary university.

== Notable alumni ==
- Sona Mohapatra
- Saraju Mohanty
