= National Institute of Technology, Rourkela =

Public technical university in Odisha, India

- Type: Public technical university Institute of National Importance
- Established: 15 August 1961 (65 years ago)
- Accreditation: NBA
- Chairperson: S. N. Subrahmanyan
- Director: K. Umamaheshwar Rao
- Academic staff: 360
- Students: 6,276
- Undergraduates: 4,007
- Postgraduates: 1,434
- Doctoral students: 835
- Location: Rourkela, Odisha, India; 22°15′12″N 84°54′04″E
- Campus: Urban 650 acres (260 ha)
- Website: www.nitrkl.ac.in

National Institute of Technology Rourkela (NIT Rourkela or NITRKL or NITR), formerly Regional Engineering College Rourkela, is a publicly funded institute of higher learning for engineering, science and technology located in the steel city of Rourkela, Odisha, India. It is one of the 31 National Institutes of Technology in India and has been recognized as an Institute of National Importance by the National Institutes of Technology Act, 2007. It is ranked 13th in the NIRF Rankings 2025 of Indian engineering universities.

== History ==
NIT Rourkela was established as Regional Engineering College (REC) Rourkela on 15 August 1961. Chief Minister of Odisha, Biju Patnaik provided the land for it, approximately 650 acres. Its foundation stone was laid by the first Prime Minister of India, Jawaharlal Nehru. It was granted autonomy in 2002 and now functions independently under the Ministry of Education.

== Campus ==
=== Location ===
The Rourkela Steel City is a medium-sized metropolis, located on the Howrah-Mumbai and Ranchi-Bhubaneswar main railway routes, and well connected to all parts of the country by road and rail. The population of the city is about 7 lakhs. The institute is about 7 km from the railway station. The campus of the institute consisting of the institute buildings, halls of residence and staff colony is situated at the eastern end of Rourkela, beyond Sector-1, on land provided by the Government of Odisha. The institute is bordered by small mountains on the south which are sometimes used as a picnic spot by students.

=== Bhubaneswar extension centre ===
With an aim to expand academic, placement and start-up activities, the institution has built an extension centre at Bhubaneswar. It is designed to cater to the needs of distance learning and short-term courses, conduct placements and training activities, promote industry-academia partnerships, and provide opportunities to promising startups.

== Infrastructure ==
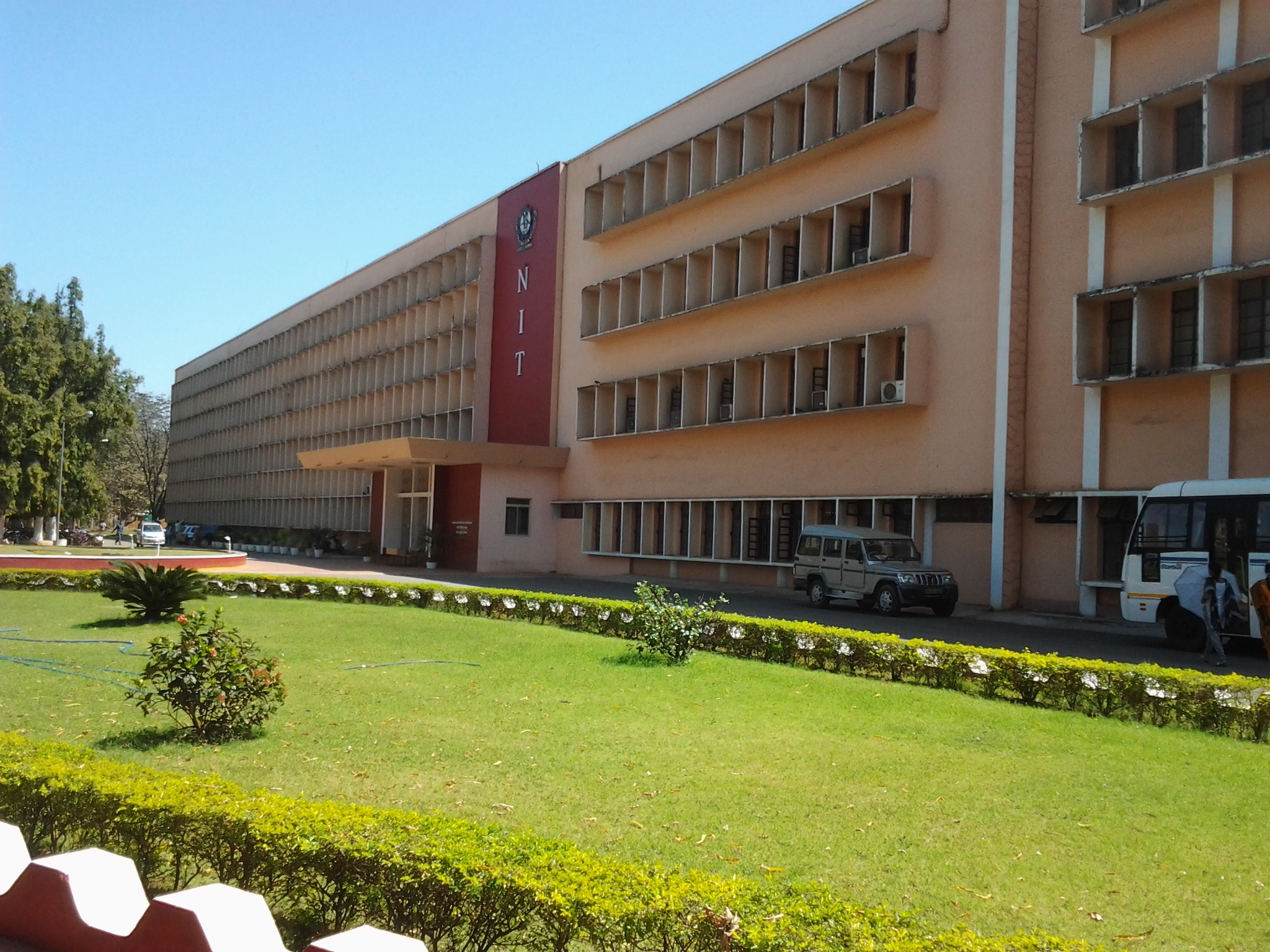
Administrative Building

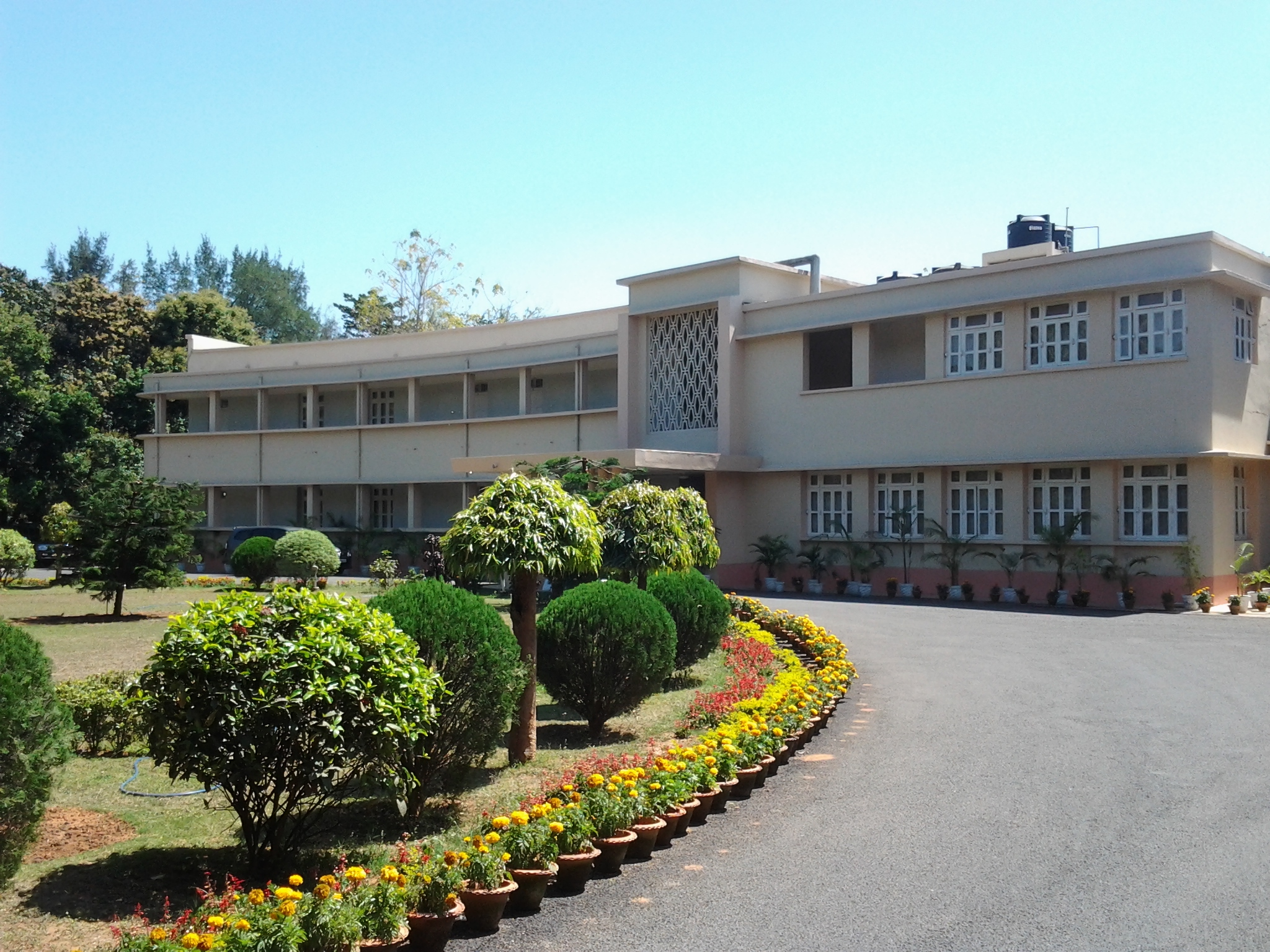
NIT - Guest House

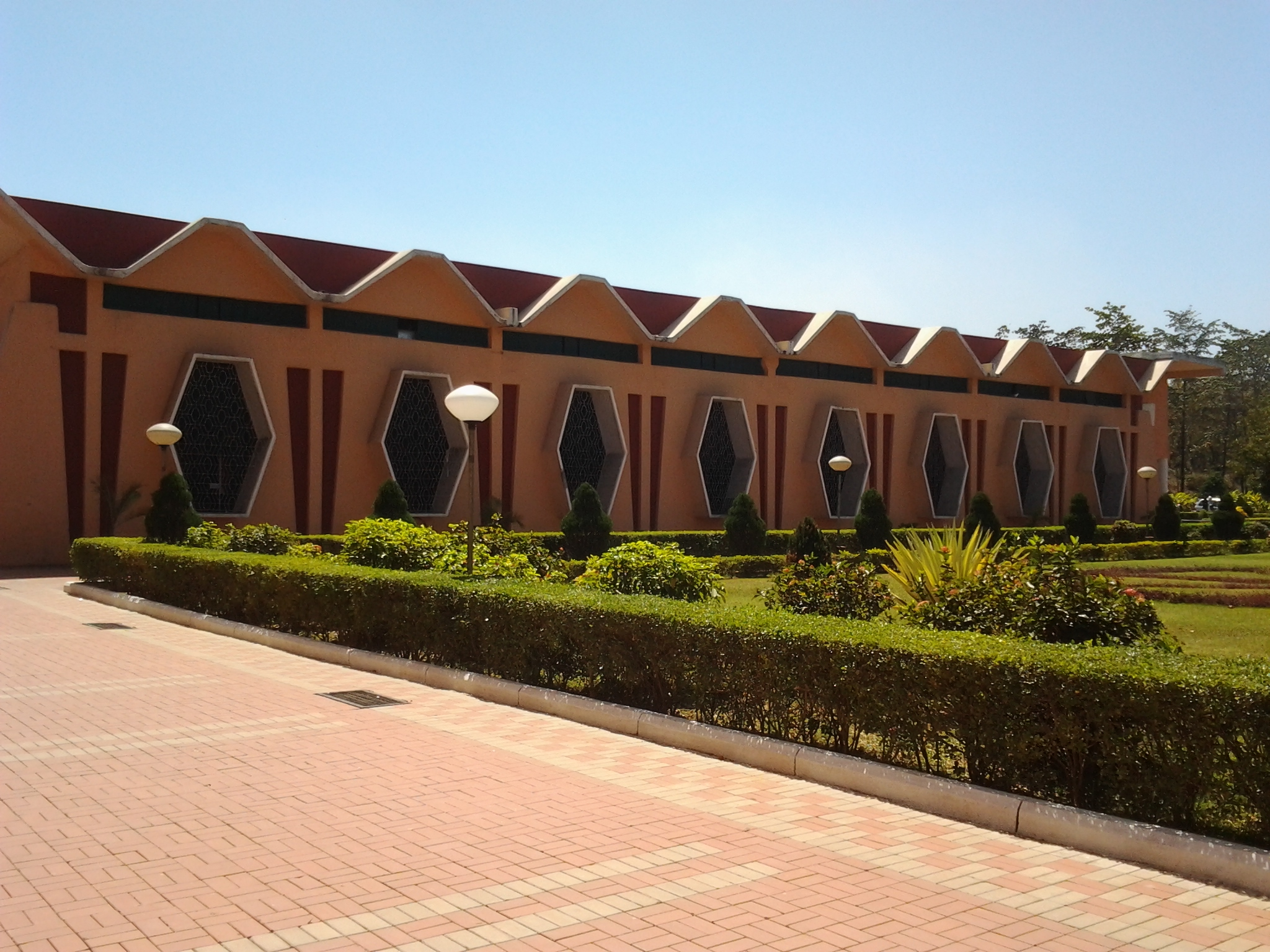
Bhubaneshwar Behera Auditorium

=== Institute library ===
The Biju Pattanaik Central Library, functional from 1965, was named after Biju Patnaik, the former chief minister of Odisha. At present, the library holds about 85,000 books and 18,000 back volumes of periodicals. It has purchased a license to access over 2000 online research journals on science and technology to foster local research activity. The BPCL is automated with an integrated library software package called Libsys - LSmart and is modernized with the latest radio frequency identification (RFID)-based automation system that facilitates self-check-in, check-out, and an automatic security system. This technology offers the fastest, easiest, and most efficient way to track, locate and manage library materials. The RFID system counts more than 1.2 lakhs of transactions (issue, return, and renewal) in a year.

==== Institute Counselling Services (ICS) ====
Institute Counselling Services (ICS) is a technical service unit (TSU) which was conceptualized in the year 2017 for the purpose of taking care of the mental health needs of the students and employees. It is headed by a head of Unit, faculty members and a dedicated student team. Visiting counsellor and psychiatrist are available to handle the mental health issues. Additionally, 24x7 online counselling services provided by YourDOST are also a part.

ICS also celebrates Mental Health Week every October to highlight the importance of mental health and spread awareness among the fraternity. Attempts are made to connect with the community through this week-long event and programs. ICS also conducts academic sessions, internship talks and personality development initiatives which aim to help the students. It also has a dedicated Android App service (ICS App) which contains an anonymous chat service and YouTube channel (ICS YouTube).

== Administration and organisation ==
=== Governance ===
The institute has different departments, centres and technical service units (TSUs). Each department or centre is headed by a faculty member and each TSU is headed by a faculty member or an officer.

The director is supported in various activities by the deans.

=== Departments ===
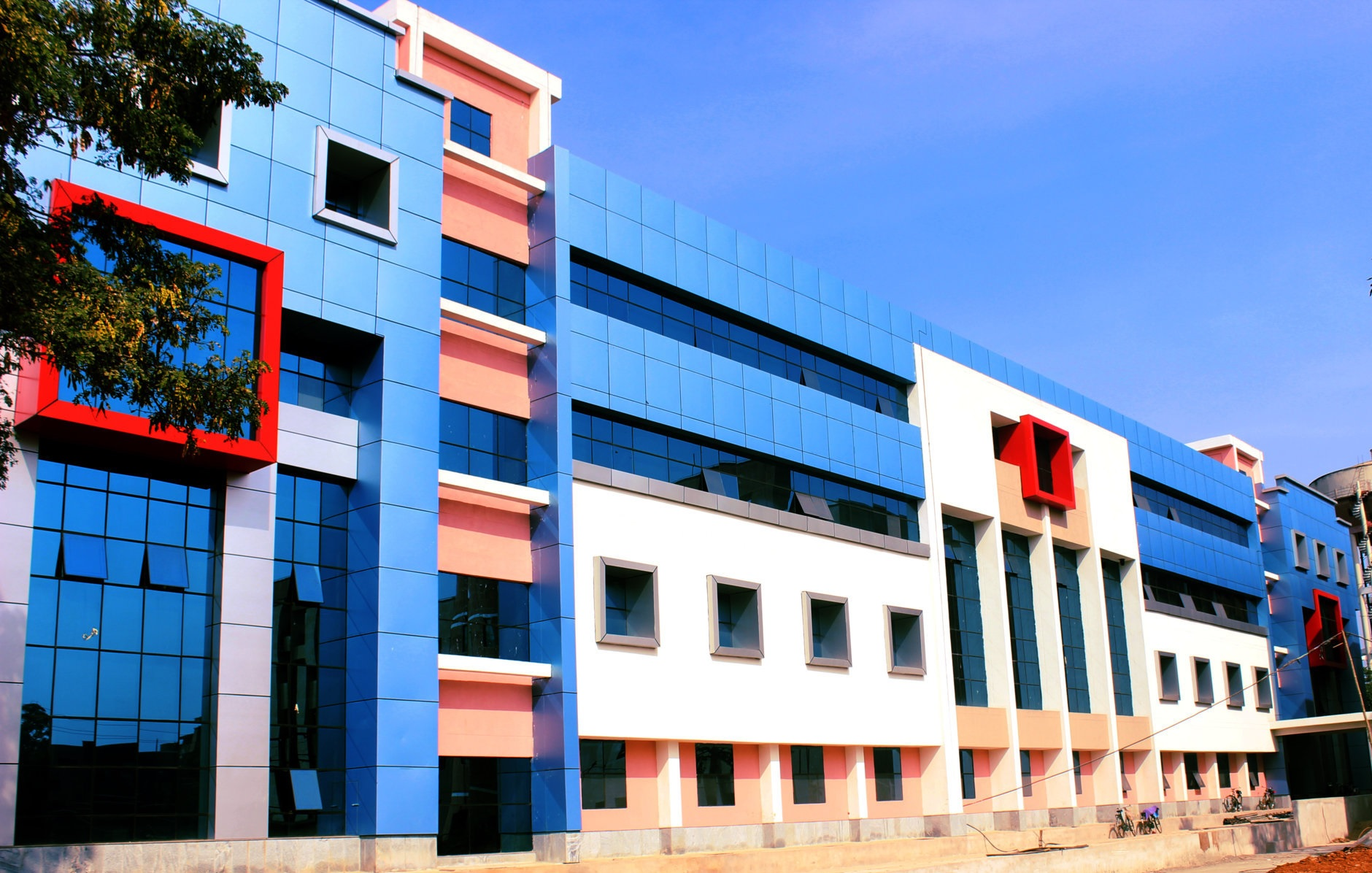
Chemical Engineering Department

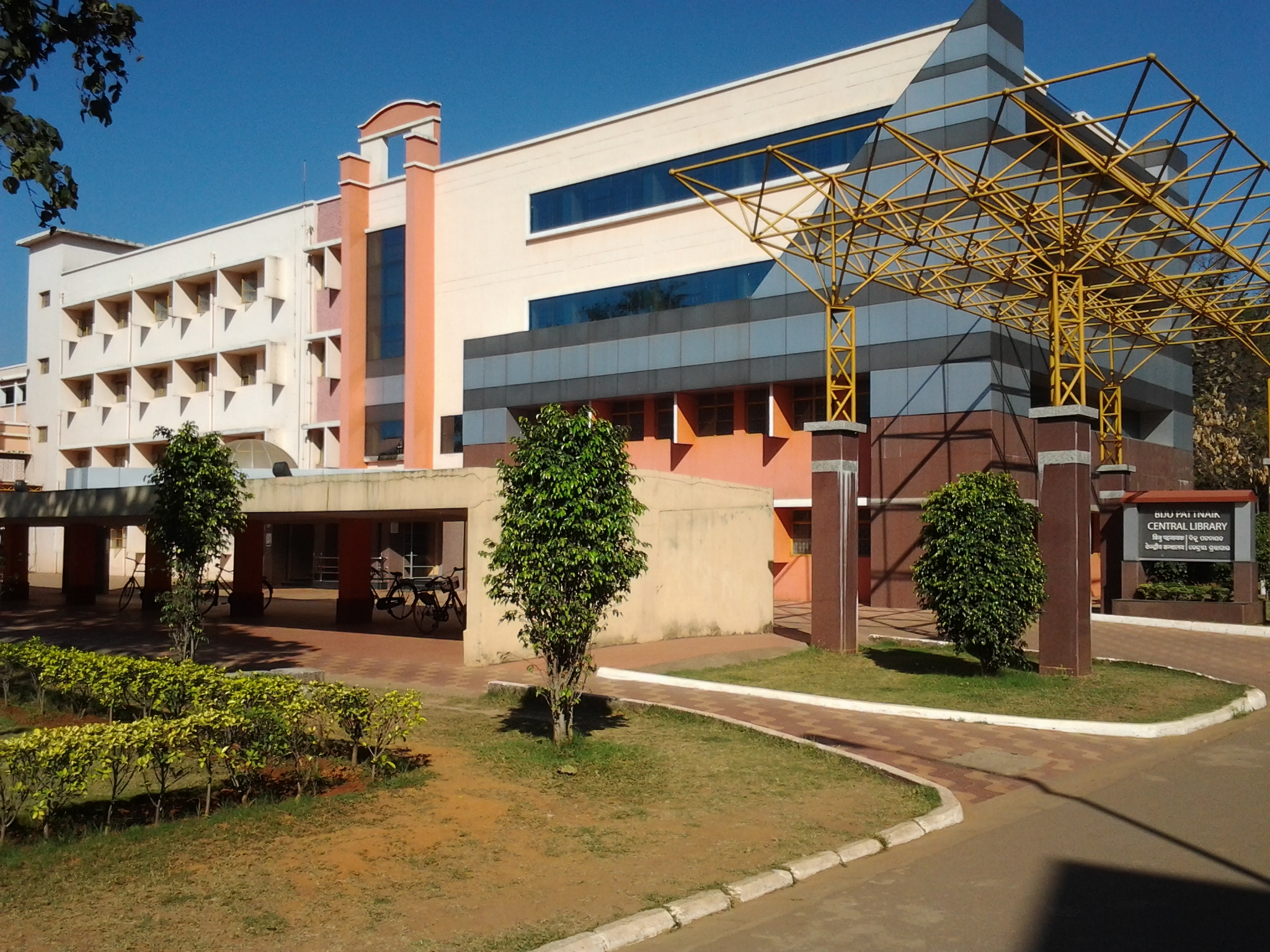
Biju Patnaik Central Library

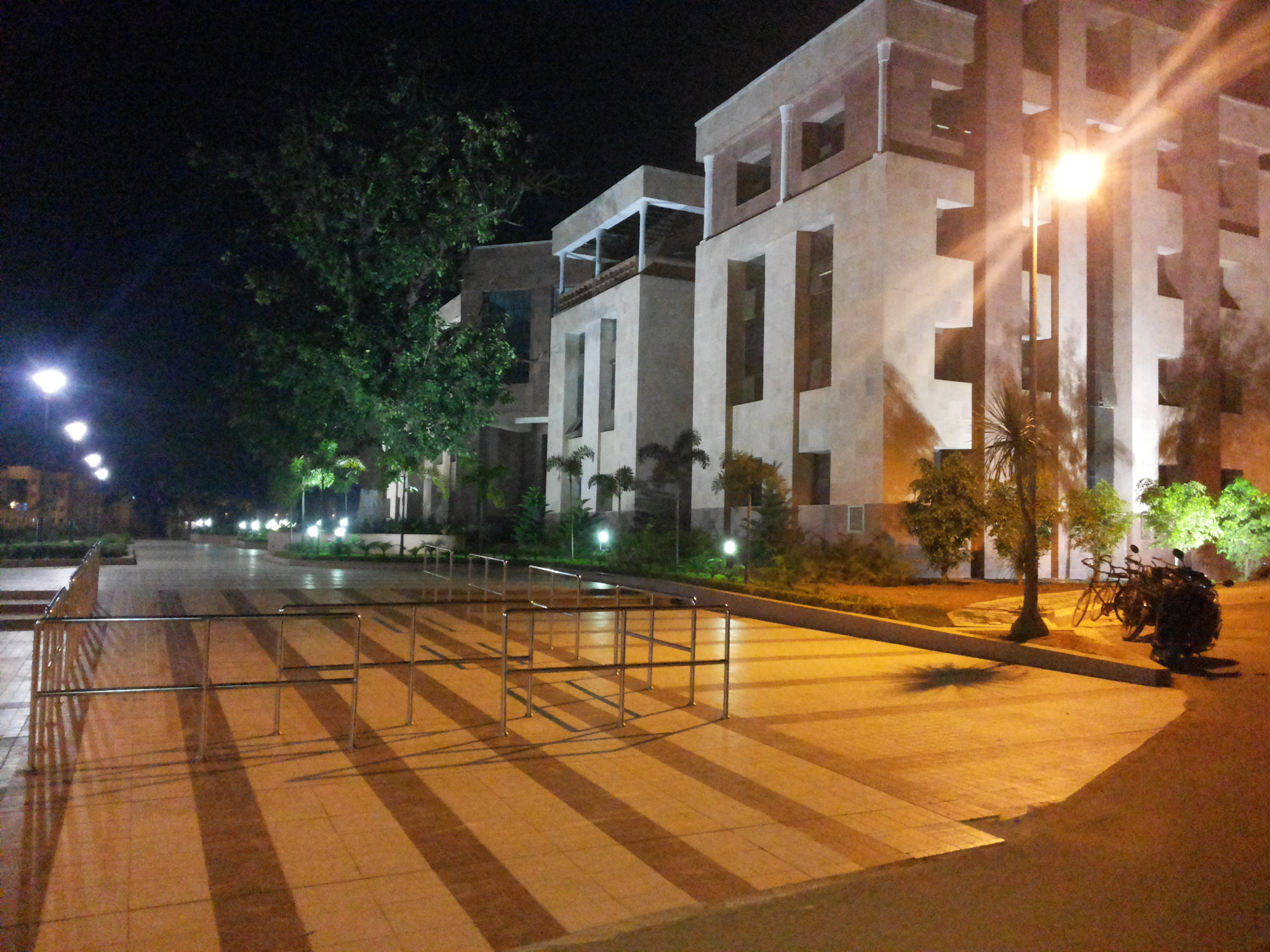
Biomedical & Biotechnology Dept.

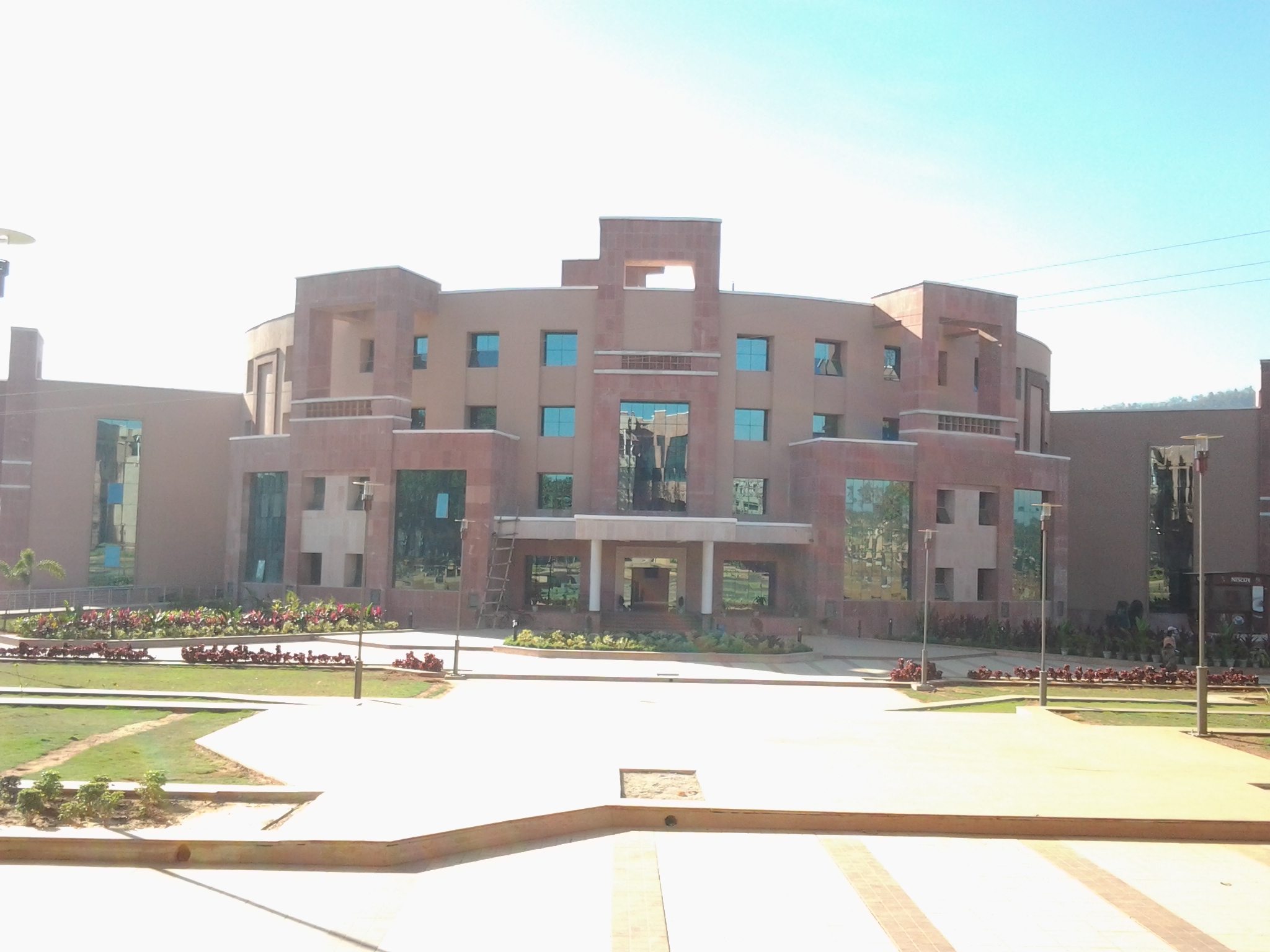
NIT Lecture Hall

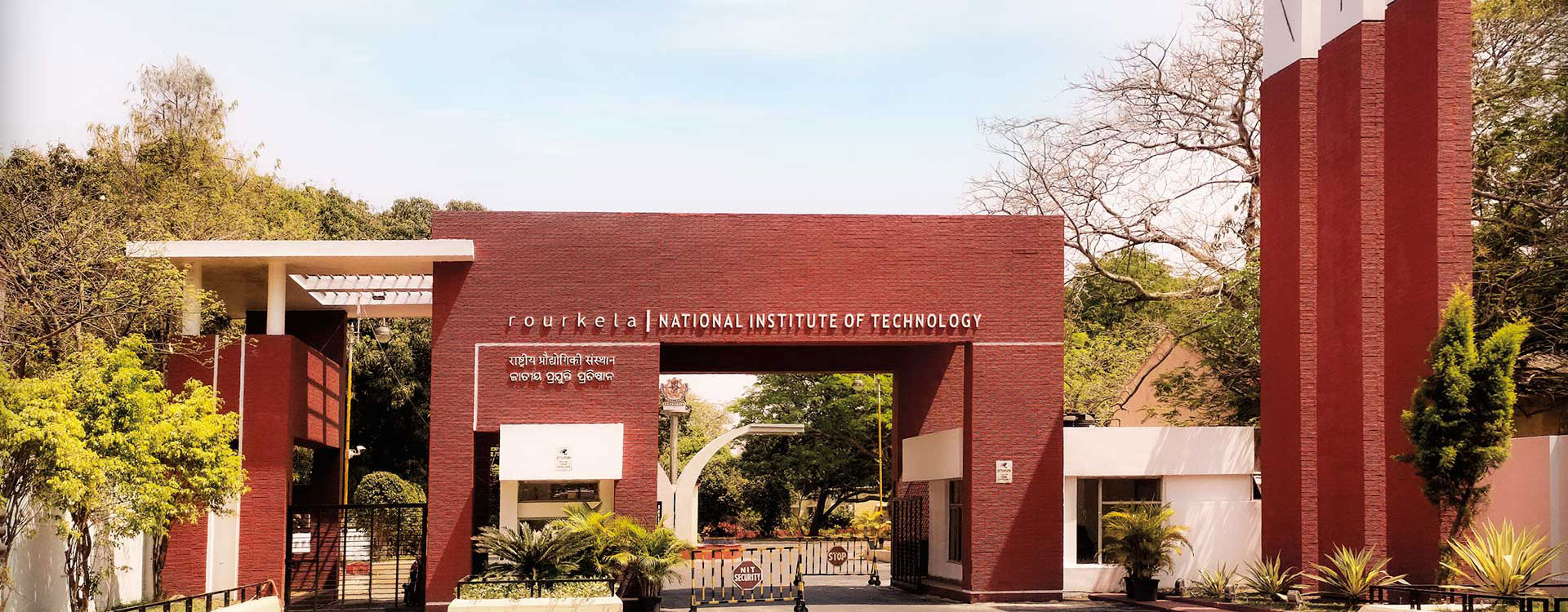
NIT Rourkela Main Gate

The institute has the following twenty departments which offer B.Tech., B.Arch, B. Tech-M. Tech Dual, M.Tech., M.Sc., Integrated M.Sc., MBA and PhD degree:

- Department of Planning and Architecture
- Department of Earth & Atmospheric Sciences
- Department of Biotechnology and Medical Engineering
- Department of Ceramic Engineering
- Department of Chemical Engineering
- Department of Chemistry
- Department of Civil Engineering
- Department of Computer Science and Engineering
- Department of Electrical Engineering
- Department of Electronics and Communication Engineering
- Department of Electronics and instrumentation Engineering
- Department of Food Process Engineering
- Department of Humanities and Social Sciences
- Department of Industrial Design
- Department of Life Science
- Department of Mathematics
- Department of Mechanical Engineering
- Department of Metallurgical & Materials Engineering
- Department of Mining Engineering
- Department of Physics and Astronomy
- Department of School of Management

== Rankings ==
NIT Rourkela was ranked 1001–1200 in the world by the Times Higher Education World University Rankings of 2023 and 251-300 in Asia for 2022. In India it was ranked 19th among engineering colleges by the National Institutional Ranking Framework (NIRF) in 2024. The QS World University Rankings ranked NIT Rourkela 317th in Asia in 2025.

University rankings

General – international
- Times (World) (2023): 1001-1200
- Times (Asia) (2022): 251-300

General – India
- NIRF (Overall) (2024): 34

Engineering – India
- NIRF (2024): 19

Architecture – India
- NIRF (2024): 9

== Student life ==
=== HackNITR ===
HackNITR is a yearly hackathon event organised in NIT Rourkela. It is the largest student run hackathon of India. The first event dates back to 2019. HackNITR 4.0 took place in January 2023 and it received 5200+ registration from 500+ colleges and 30+ countries across the globe. Overall 336 projects were submitted in HackNITR 4.0. HackNITR is organised by students from Google Developer Student Clubs (GDSC) NIT Rourkela in collaboration with OpenCode, Opensource community of NITR.

=== TEDxNITRourkela ===
TEDxNITRourkela is an independently organised TED event, under a license from TED Conferences LLC. It was organised for the first time in 2011 and again in the following year, 2012. After a long gap, TEDxNITRourkela has been organised on 13 and 14 March 2021 by a team of students from NITR, led by Abel Mathew and Rutaj Dash.

=== Monday Morning ===
Monday Morning, also referred to as MM, is the student media platform at NIT Rourkela, founded in 2006, and the name of its e-newsletter. It aims to bridge the gap between the administration and the student community. The MM e-newsletter is published weekly during the academic year.

In its first years of operation, the issues MM covered included construction problems with the new Vikram Sarabhai Residence Hall and child labour abuse in a residence mess. Its coverage of the latter attracted the attention of the Chief Warden, who "formed a team to inspect and raid all halls of residence caterers and mess owners to check on the number of children below the age of 14 working there and how they were treated".

In 2012, it was reported that the newsletter's 'Placement Life' and 'Director's Desk' columns received just under 8,000 website hits per week. That year, The Hindu reported that the newsletter had three chief coordinators, whose role was to set the newsletter's agenda, guide and co-ordinate other team members, and edit articles. Writing articles was done by a content team. Four students were responsible for the newsletter's policies, new features, setting long-term goals, performing regular reviews of the newsletter and taking decisions on coverage of controversial issues. It was reported that students spent two to three hours per week each on the newsletter, using the campus computer facility.

== Notable alumni ==
- Rahul Shrivastava, IFS Officer & Ambassador to Namibia
- Soma Mondal, Chairperson of Steel Authority of India
- Damodar Acharya, Former Chairman AICTE and Former Director IIT Kharagpur
- Sandip Das Former CEO, Reliance Jio Infocomm, Former CEO, Maxis Communications
- Ashutosh Dutta Senior Scientist, 5G Chief Strategist at Johns Hopkins University Applied Physics Lab, JHU/APL Sabbatical Fellow, Adjunct Faculty and ECE Chair for EP at Johns Hopkins University.
- Debasish Ghose, Professor at Department of Aerospace Engineering Indian Institute of Science
- CP Gurnani, B.Tech-chemical engineering, managing director and CEO of Tech Mahindra
- Akash Khurana, B.Tech-mechanical engineering, theatre and film personality; COO of NIMBUS
- Nalini Ranjan Mohanty, former IOFS officer, chairman and managing director of the Hindustan Aeronautics Limited (HAL)
- Ajit Andhare, COO, Viacom18 Studios
- Shrikant M Vaidya, Chairman, IOCL
- Prasant Mohapatra, Provost & Executive Vice President, University of South Florida
