= Santosh Mitra Square =

Square and urban park in Kolkata

- সন্তোষ মিত্র স্কোয়ার
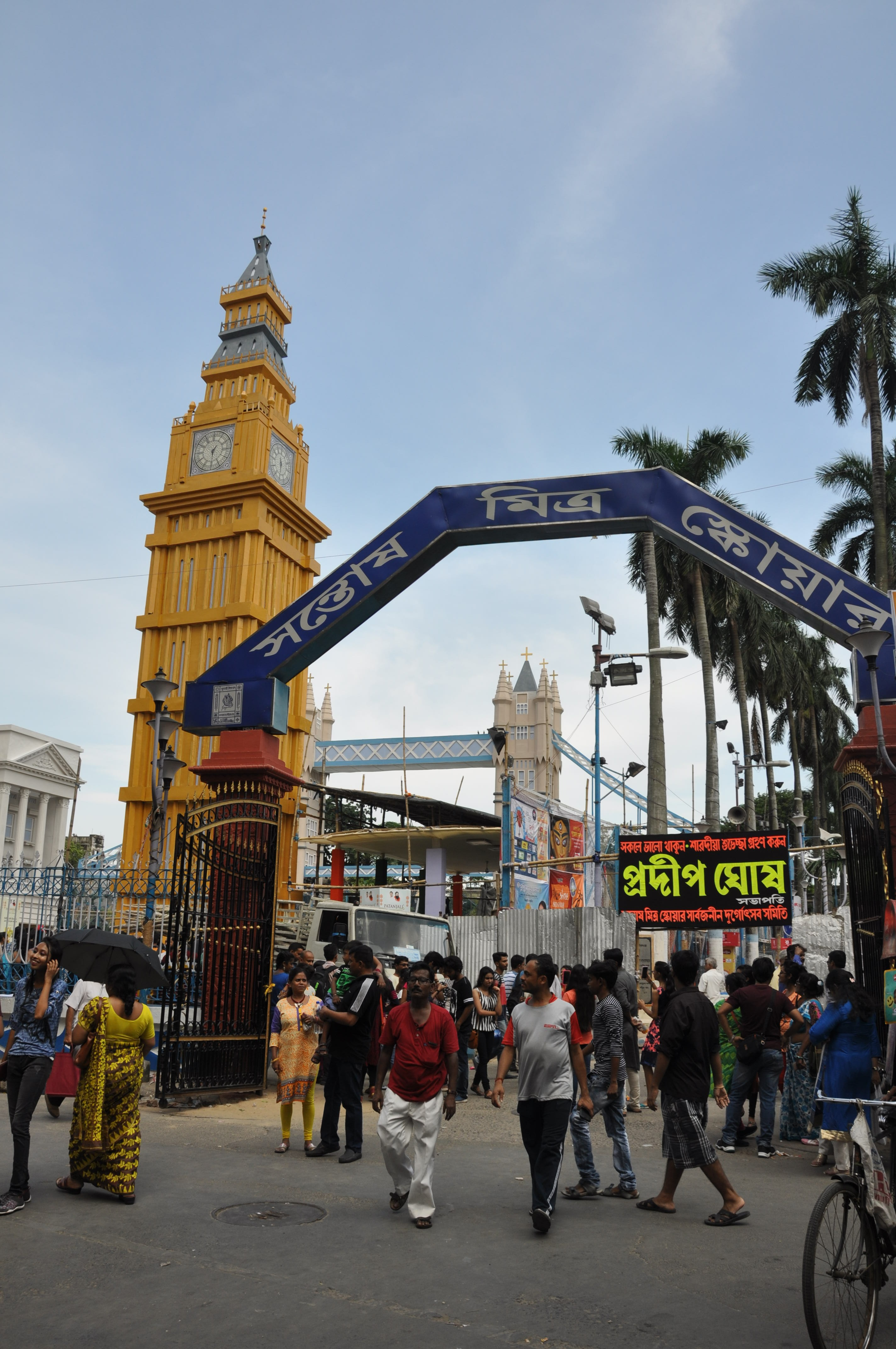
- Santosh Mitra Square in 2021
- Interactive map of Santosh Mitra Square
- Type: Urban park
- Motto: "Long Live Martyr Santosh Mitra"
- Location: Bowbazar, Kolkata
- Coordinates: 22.565877°N 88.365564°E
- Established: 1936
- Closed: On Sundays
- Etymology: Santosh Kumar Mitra
- Operator: Sajal Ghosh
- Visitors: 70,000–80,000 per hour (during Durga puja)
- Open: 11:30 a.m. to 11:30 pm.
- Public transit: Metro, train and bus

Santosh Mitra Square is a public square and tourist attraction located in Bowbazar, Kolkata. It is a popular gathering place for various cultural and political events. The park is named after the Bengali freedom fighter Santosh Kumar Mitra. One of the events held here is Durga Puja, an annually held festival, for which the park is crowded during puja days. It is visited by people from far and wide for its Durga Puja pandals. Also known as Lebutala Park. The Durga Puja of the park was started in 1936. Sajal Ghosh is the secretary and main organizer. (Note: Supported by multiple references:) It is located very close to Sealdah railway station.

== Durga Puja themes ==
Durga Puja is the most celebrated festival in Bengal. It is a ten-day festival that celebrates the victory of good over evil and Durga's victory over Mahishasura. It is observed all over West Bengal and Bangladesh with great enthusiasm, usually occurring in the months of September or October. The festival begins with Mahalaya when the idols of Durga and her children Ganesh, Karthik, Lakshmi, Saraswati and her divine enemy Mahishasura are crafted and installed in pandals. The idols are worshipped with offerings, often featuring garlands or malas worn by the idols'. Special rituals are performed on the seventh (Saptami), eighth (Ashtami) and ninth days (Navami). Durga Puja ends with Vijaya Dashami as the tenth day, noticeably when Durga wins the battle against her enemy. Most of the idols are immersed in a nearby pond, lake or river on the tenth day.

=== 2026: Sanatani Chetanay Vande Mataram ===
2026 is the 91st celebration year of Durga Puja in Santosh Mitra Square. The theme was chosen as "Vande Mataram" to mark the 150th year from which the poem was written by Bankim Chandra Chatterjee. Santosh Mitra Square's puja committee gave the name of the pandal as "Sanatani Chetanay Vande Mataram". The construction of the pandal had begun by July, amid celebrations in various parts of India for the song's 150th anniversary. Santosh Mitra Square's secretary Sajal Ghosh remarked about the pandal theme: "This is the 150th year of Vande Mataram. This is the soil where Vande Mataram was born. We want to pay our tribute to it in every possible way. We have always tried to present nationalist themes through our Durga Puja. It was the clarion call of Vande Mataram that inspired India’s freedom movement, and we want to portray that journey through this year’s pandal."

==== Description (2026) ====
The pandal was reported to have statues of Matangini Hazra and Khudiram Bose, who worked for India's freedom. It was described to feature original photographs from during the 1947 partition era of India and also a train installation depicting the exoduses during the partition. The facade of the pandal was made in the shape of the map of India. It was also stated that around 180 people worked on constructing it. Unlike previous year's pandal, it was stated to not include any audio–visual show across the pavillion.

==== Inauguration (2026) ====
The 2026 pandal of Santosh Mitra Square was inaugurated on 11 October by Suvendu Adhikari, the Chief Minister of West Bengal. Earlier in that day, he attended a festival with drone shows, light displays and fireworks at Eden Gardens stadium. He made a post on X (Twitter), writing about the starting of Durga Puja, besides greeting people on occasion. He was accompanied by other members of his political party, such as Sunil Bansal, Samik Bhattacharya, Sukanta Majumdar and others.

=== 2025: Operation Sindoor ===
Santosh Mitra Square in 2025

Santosh Mitra Square opted for a patriotic theme in the Durga Puja of 2025. The committee chose Operation Sindoor as its theme. (Note: Supported by multiple references:) With the song "Aarambh Hi Prachanda" playing in the background. This theme had been chosen to honor the bravery of the Indian military forces in the armed conflict. The park uses visual imaging on a mountain-like canopy to represent tension between the two countries like Pahalgam terrorist attacks in Jammu and Kashmir and cross-border terrorism. Models of military weapons and missiles are also present to add to the theme. (Note: Supported by multiple references:) The visual imaging was about delivering strong nationalistic and patriotic messages. Besides, Prime Minister Narendra Modi and IT professors Bitan Adhikari and Samir Das who both died in the Pahalgam attacks were also present in it.

==== Description (2025) ====
The pandal resembled a rugged mountain with a cave, symbolizing "the strenuous terrains Indian soldiers had to overcome in missions", particularly the Pahalgam mission. The exterior symbolizes military features such as camouflage, barbed wires and soldier silhouttes. It had an enormous structure made with fibers for durability. The Durga maa idol was present inside the cave, made by the Mintu Pal Studio of Kumartuli. The idol was surround by texture to resemble a military bunker or outpost. The visual imaging projected illustrations on the 'mountain', showing the Indian army.

==== Inauguration (2025) ====
Santosh Mitra Square's 2025 theme was inaugurated on September 26 (Friday) by Amit Shah, the Minister of Home Affairs. (Note: Supported by multiple references:) BJP state president Shamik Bhattacharya, Leader of the Opposition Suvendu Adhikari and Tapas Roy were also present on that day. Amit Shah arrived Kolkata on September 25 and came here immediately after visiting the Kalighat Temple and worshipped Durga upon reaching the pandal on the next day afternoon. After the inauguration, Shah watched the visual-audio projection show made to go along with the theme. He then wished the people of Bengal to have a happy puja and then expressed the glory of Navaratri and upcoming election by giving a speech. Shah said that in the upcoming 2026 Vidhan Sabha elections, a new government would be formed in Bengal termed 'Sonar Bangla' (Golden Bengal), that would help Bengal in becoming safe, prosperous and provided with necessary facilities just like what Rabindranath Tagore (Kaviguru) would have imagined .Finally, Shah paid gratitude to the people of Kolkata affected by disasters before returning to Delhi. The disaster-affected individuals include at least 10 people of Kolkata who died because of excessive rainfall on September 23. After here, he visited Paschim Banga Sanskriti Mancha in Salt Lake where he recalled social reformer Ishwar Chandra Vidyasagar. (Note: Supported by multiple references:)

==== Based on ====
On April 22, 2025 India faced terrorist attacks in Jammu and Kashmir as 26 people were shot and killed in the Baisaran Valley. The Indian army specifically blew up the terrorists' bases in Pakistan and Pakistan-occupied Kashmir. This operation was named as "Operation Sindoor".

==== Visual and sound show ====
Durga Puja idols in the 2025 pandal

The pandal resembled a rugged mountain with an Indian model tank emitting smoke and bomb sounds. Projections were made on this "mountain" that delineate the operation. This show also featured actors and tourists in Pahalgam. Actors could be seen portraying Bitan and Samir with their families. Terrorists appear on the scene afterwards and open fire with the tourists fleeing. The show continued to show much of Operation Sindoor with the patriotic chants "Vande Mataram" and "Bharat Mata Ki Jai" playing. On September 27 (Saturday), Muchipara police station, under jurisdiction of Kolkata Police, sent a letter to the company handling the light and sound show. The police had asked for some of the company's info; they asked for the company's license, agreement with the puja committee, GST documents and sound limiter documents. Police also looked for a permission letter from the puja organizers for orchestrating the light and sound show in the pandal. The police notice mentions orders of Calcutta High Court and West Bengal Pollution Control Board. Sajal Ghosh accused Trinamool Congress for these actions. (Note: Supported by multiple references:)

==== Issues with Kolkata Police ====
Sajal Ghosh, secretary of the park, made allegations on the Kolkata Police about them harassing the puja committee members and close the pandal that year, as a high number of people were coming. In response of police also intentionally blocking access to the pandal, shortening the 40 feet entranceway to 15 feet by placing barricades, forcing people to walk 3 kilometers instead of simply taking a 700-meter road as intended, (Note: Supported by multiple references:) Ghosh threatened to close the pandal and immerse the idols before Vijaya Dashami if the action continued. (Note: Supported by multiple references:) After 4 notices were made, the police turned up in Santosh Mitra Square to inspect the preparations. The notice said to have enough space for entering and exiting the pandal, deploy about 250 trained volunteers in the pandal, prohibition of vendors and hawkers near the exit gate, ban light-sound show, place advertisement gates and install CCTV cameras. Ghosh said about the situation that the ground had been surrounded by railings, the people in charge of the light and sound show are being harassed. The police had given them permission after they submitted all the correct documents. Ghosh called the letters to be 'threatening', and said they are willing to discuss this matter with the police and cooperate. He also alleged that police had barricaded part of Sealdah station, preventing people from coming. Kolkata Police Commissioner Manoj Verma denied the charges made. (Note: Supported by multiple references:)

==== Route change ====
Before the puja began, Deputy Commissioners of Police suggested the entry to the park from BB Ganguly Street connecting Koley Market to be blocked. Instead, the Jagat Cinema-Amherst Street that connects the Bank of India crossing could be used. An officer said that this new proposal had been made to increase the circulation area and prevent BB Ganguly Street from becoming too populated like last year had done. As the popularity grew, police once again made a new deployment plan covering the sectors of Mohammed Ali Park, College Square and Santosh Mitra Square.

=== 2024: Las Vegas Sphere ===
In Durga Puja of 2024, Santosh Mitra Square featured a recreation of the Las Vegas Sphere in United States with special effects and lightning, it attracted hundreds of thousands of visitors. (Note: Supported by multiple references:) To replicate the world's largest digital screen, the puja organizers had installed hundreds of LED screens. The deplorable rain had completely halted their work, and they needed to cover the whole project with polythene sheets and suspend the work for 3 days. After the rain had stopped, the organizers took additional measures to prevent malfunctions or electric faults during the puja in case of rain, Ghosh said. The Kolkata Police studied the number of people in Durga puja pandals and sent letters accordingly to the committees where the number was higher. One of the first was a letter by Muchipara police station to the organizers of Santosh Mitra Square about managing their crowd circulation. Ghosh expressed disapproval of the multiple restrictions that the letter suggested. The organizers were instructed not to use any lasers or lights as the situation in 2022 had caused massive population. They letter said to enlarge the entrance and exit gates, to have a dedicated special platform in the middle area inside the park for police surveillance, keep sufficient space inside the pandal to not have older people or children to face difficulties, have sufficient lighting, replace the previous 14 CCTVs with 36 and at least 100 volunteers should be kept during off-peak hours and at least 250 volunteers in peak hours. (Note: Supported by multiple references:) Chief Minister Mamata Banerjee held a discussion on September 23 (Monday) at the Netaji Indoor Stadium about an increase in puja donations. She said the donation for each club in Durga puja would be increased to 85,000 for each club. Santosh Mitra Square returned the donation amount. Chants were also made about the R.G. Kar Hospital case in the pandal. Ghosh commented on allowing the people to chant slogans and express their grief as they like. He offered to turn down the volume in the pandal to enable the people's voices to be heard and did not want to suppress their voices. The pandal's light show was said to be 11D, this means the images of Durga could be viewed from 11 directions.

=== 2023: Ayodhya Ram Mandir ===
Santosh Mitra Square in 2023

The 2023 theme for the Santosh Mitra Square was modeled after the Ram Mandir (Temple) in Ayodhya, Uttar Pradesh. It had 150 artisans working on it. Special lighting had been arranged by two teams from Kolkata and Mumbai. It included 3D projections of deities. The actual Ram Mandir in Ayodhya, which it was based on, was to be inaugurated in January 2024.

==== Details ====
According to the blueprints of the actual temple, Santosh Mitra Square's ceiling and walls of the pandal were made of foam and thermocol. A huge screen showed a silhouette of Lord Rama, Hanuman carrying a hill on his shoulder and the three Rama, Lakshman and Sita together. The inside of the pandal, near the idols was brightened by lights. The exterior was decorated mainly with reddish-pink lights and other minor "eye-catching lights".

==== Inauguration (2023) ====
The pandal was inaugurated by Amit Shah on October 16 (Monday). He was to arrive in Kolkata through airways, landing in Netaji Subhas International Airport. Shah was to hold a meeting at the airport with BJP leaders, including Suvendu Adhikari and Locket Chatterjee. BJP state president Sukanta Majumdar due to his unwellness and MP of Medinipur Dilip Ghosh were to be not present in the meeting. But Majumdar was present. Shah's motorcade arrived at the square at around 4:15 p.m. and left for Delhi from the international airport after wishing the people of Bengal to have a happy and prosperous puja. While at the square, he said that BJP would solve the problems in Bengal and abolish corruption of Trinamool in Bengal, telling about the 2024 West Bengal Lok Sabha elections. Shah had set a target of 35 seats in the election, considered to be unrealistic by many, the party had gotten an 'overwhelming response', a boost of BJP in the election to the Santosh Mitra Square. Shah was accompanied by Suvendu Adhikari, Sukanta Majumdar, Nishit Pramanik and Rahul Sinha at the opening.

==== Kolkata Police requirements ====
In 2022, MG Road and CR Avenue had become overpopulated with visitors going through Amherst Street, BB Ganguly Street and MG Road affecting traffic movement. To avoid issues again, police had wanted both sides of Amherst Street and BB Ganguly Street to be barricaded alongside the sidewalks. They also planned to disallow vendors and hawkers to stay near the exit of the square to allow visitors to leave faster. Mamata Banerjee had asked the puja committees to take measurements for the puja so the visitors can come and go without facing much difficulties.

=== 2022: Azadi ka Amrit Mahotsav ===
Santosh Mitra Square's theme in 2022 was Azadi ka Amrit Mahotsav and the pandal model was about the Red Fort. It was constructed for the 75th year of India's independence in 1947. The story of Indian monuments like India Gate, Indian Parliament, Wagah Border and the independence movement would be shown through 3D projections and lighting.

==== Inauguration (2022) ====
Santosh Mitra Square's Red Fort was incepted by Mithun Chakraborty, actor and BJP Rajya Sabha Member on September 26 (Monday). Before the 2021 Bidhan Sabha elections, many movie stars and actors of the Indian Bengali cinema had pulled up to BJP office of West Bengal, he is one of the only ones who stayed on after the defeat of BJP. The organizers had originally asked Amit Shah for the inauguration, but he was busy with work and couldn't come. Shah was to come to Kolkata on November 5 to attend the Eastern Zonal Council meeting, as he was the council chairperson of it. He was also invited to inaugurate the Eastern Zonal Cultural Centre pandal in Salt Lake.

==== Circulation plans of police ====
A detailed circulation map was issued by Kolkata Police including metro stations, police stations, subways, etc. on Sep 24 to control the populous puja areas of Kolkata including Santosh Mitra Square, College Square and others.

- People coming from Sealdah railway station should take the BB Ganguly Street to visit Santosh Mitra Square.
- If BB Ganguly Street is overpopulated, MG Road can be taken to visit College Square and Mohammad Ali Park. A left can also be taken from MG Road on Amherst Street to visit the square or Kaiser Street.
- A right can be taken from MG Road on Surya Sen Street to visit Sealdah Athletic Club.
- Bus or tram on APC Road can be taken to Vivekananda Road and a procedure to west to find multiple pandals.
- North can be taken on APC Road to visit puja pandals in the North, and other plans.

==== Invitee gates ====
Mamata Banerjee had pledged to install VIP gates at puja pandals for people with VIP passes to get a quick a straightforward entry. Some puja organizations had dropped these VIP gates for 'invitee gates' selected for club patrons and specially abled, now being a standard practice of Durga puja pandals. Sajal Ghosh commented on the matter, "We all love privileged treatment. Such treatment is there in almost every religious place in the world. A puja pandal like ours that attracts lakhs of people cannot be any different. We, too, call the VIP gate as invitee gate."

== Etymology ==
The square and park are named after Santosh Kumar Mitra, activist and sponsor of the Indian independence movement, born on August 15, 1900. He died in 1931, living only for 31 years. Mitra passed his matriculation exams in 1915 from Hindu School in Kolkata and graduated from the Calcutta University in 1919. Mitra completed M.A. and L.L.B. in about 1921–1922. He took part in the Non-cooperation movement and Indian National Congress which caused him to face jail time. After the suspension of the movement, Mitra turned to extremist activities in hope of Indian independence. In 1923, Barendra Ghosh, associated with Mitra and 4 others, attempted a burglary in Shankharitola post office and he was caught after killing the postmaster. Mitra was also arrested cause of his relations to Barendra. On September 15, 1931, 3 inmates of the Hijli Detention Camp escaped. The very next day, British police enraged by the incident surrounded and entered the camp and deliberately fired upon the detainees, in which both Santosh Mitra and Tarakeshwar Sengupta died. The park was named upon his honor.
