= College Street (Kolkata) =

Road in Kolkata, India

- Boi Para (Books Neighborhood)
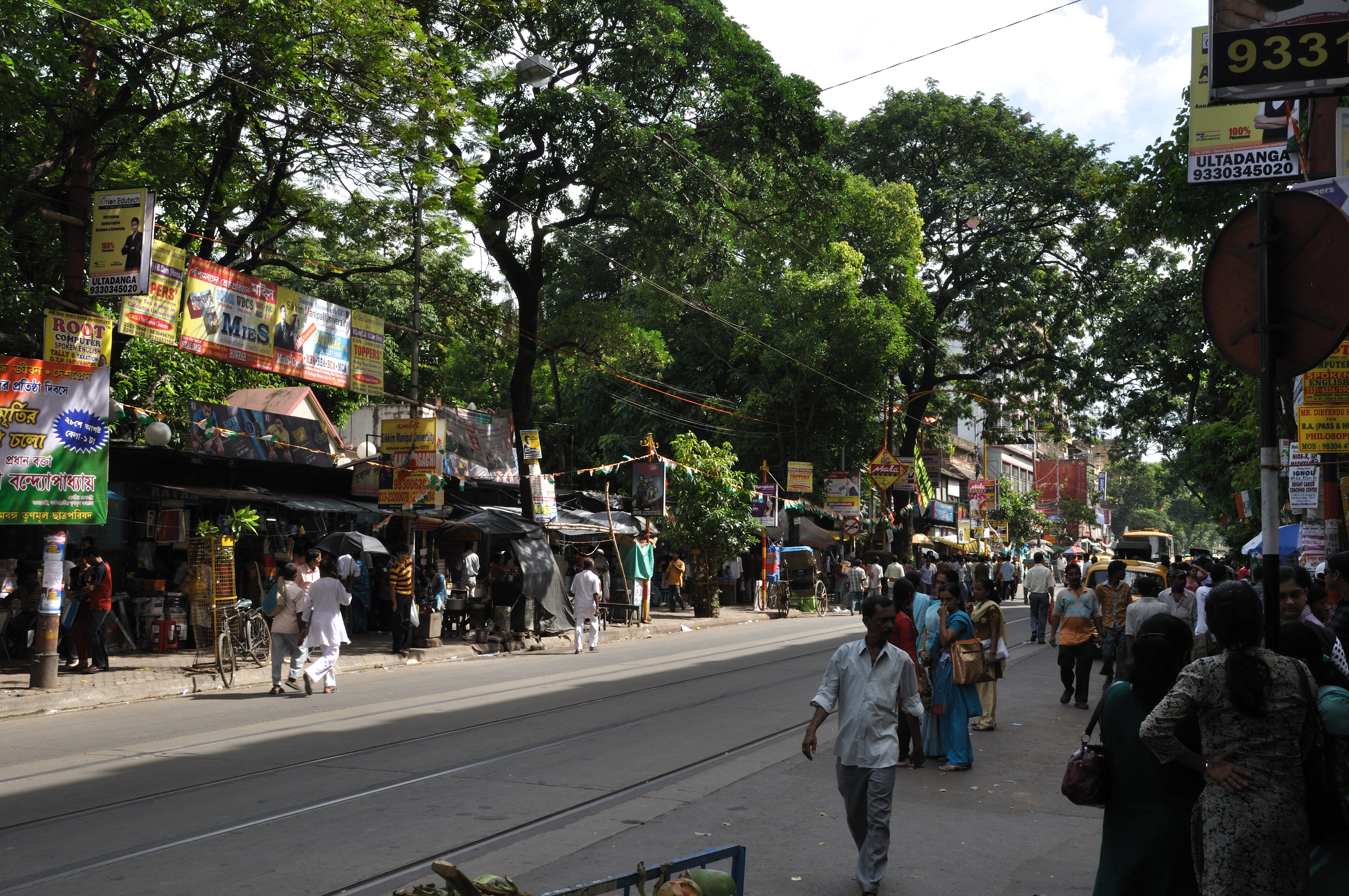
- Book stores and tram tracks along College Street
- Interactive map of College Street
- Native name: কলেজ স্ট্রিট (Bengali)
- Maintained by: Kolkata Municipal Corporation
- Length: 0.9 km (0.56 mi)
- Location: Kolkata, India
- Postal code: 700012, 700073
- Nearest Kolkata Metro station: MG Road, Central and Sealdah
- Coordinates: 22.575514°N 88.363354°E
- North end: Bidhan Sarani
- South end: Bowbazar

College Street (Bengali: কলেজ স্ট্রিট) is a 900 metre long street in Central Kolkata in the Indian state of West Bengal. Also known as Boi Para (Bengali: বইপাড়া; lit. Book Town), it stretches from Bidhan Sarani road up to Bowbazar (before Nirmal Chandra Street) via MG Road crossing and Surya Sen Street crossing. Its name derives from the presence of numerous colleges and universities like University of Calcutta, Calcutta Medical College, Presidency University, The Sanskrit College and University, City College of Commerce and Business Administration etc. The road houses many centres of intellectual activity especially the Indian Coffee House, a café that has attracted the city's intelligentsia for decades. College Street is the largest book market in India as well as Asia and the largest secondhand book market in the whole world.

== Book stores ==
The College Street has small and big book stores, which gives it the nickname Boi Para (Colony of Books). People from the whole city and different parts of the state come to the book stores along with the side-walk for books. Many established large Bengali publication industry (like: Ananda Publishers, Mitra and Ghosh Publishers, DasGupta and Company Pvt. Ltd, Dey's Publishing, Rupa & Co. etc.) are situated here. The street is also dotted with many small book kiosks which sell new and old books. Books vary from school or college textbooks to works of emerging authors and old, second-hand texts which have notes scribbled on them. The list is long, and one might find anything and everything between books dating back to 250 years ago, first editions or even books from publishers who no longer exist today. An article in the journal Smithsonian described College Street as ...a half-mile of bookshops carrying first editions, pamphlets, paperbacks in every Indian language, a collection of books in and out of print from France, Germany, Russia and England. One can buy rare books at throw-away prices and extensive bargaining takes place.

== Recognition ==
In 2007, College Street featured among the famous landmarks of India which have made it to 6pm to 9pm Magazine's "Best of Asia" list.

== Educational institutes ==
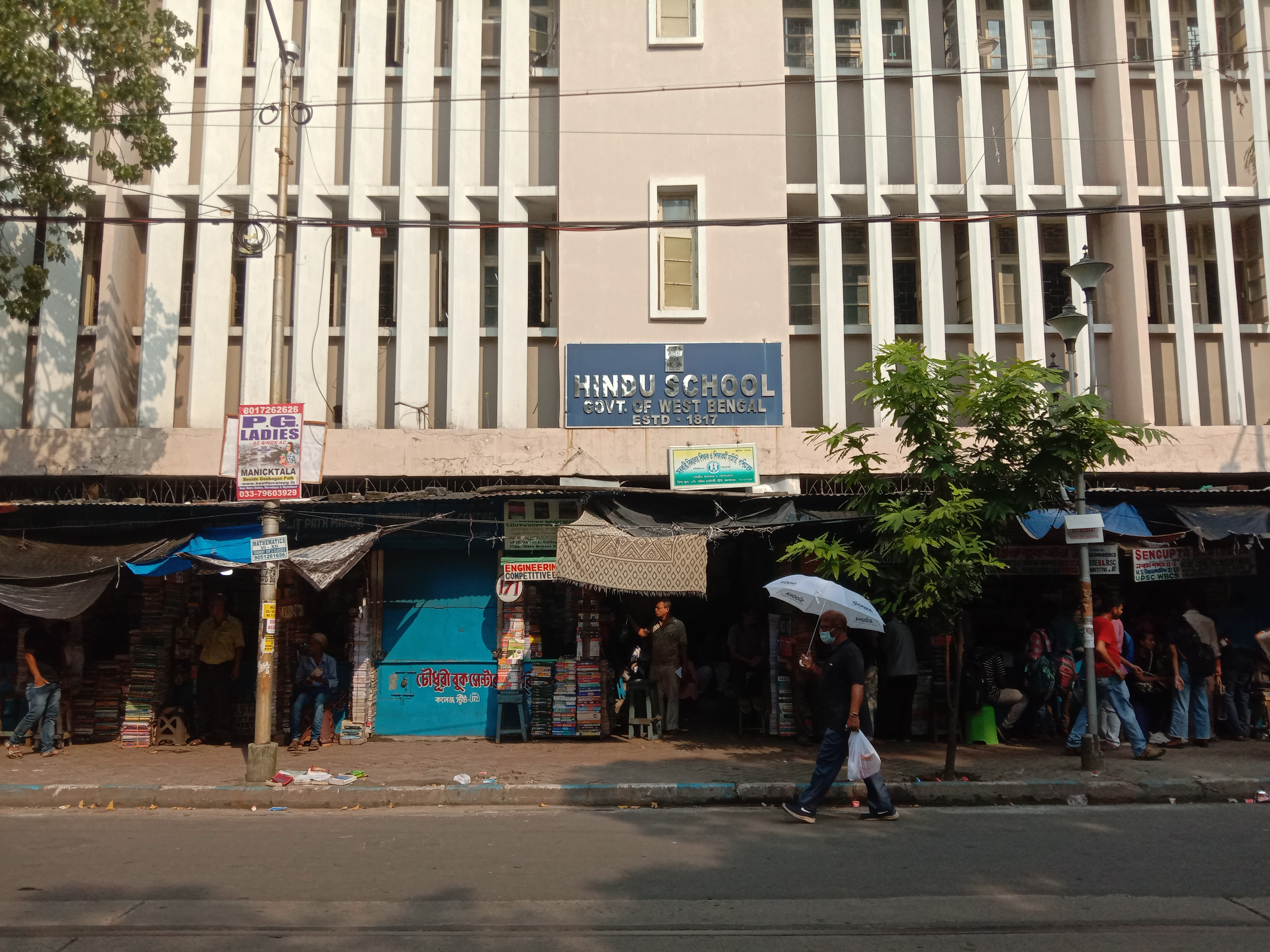
Front view of Hindu School, the oldest educational institution in College Street, in August 2022.

Well-known academic institutions situated on this street include:

=== Universities ===
- Presidency University, established as Hindoo College in 1817, making it one of the oldest post secondary liberal arts colleges in South Asia.
- Sanskrit College and University, established in 1824.
- University of Calcutta, established in 1857, and the first university (to be established as a secular multidisciplinary university) in South Asia.

=== Colleges ===
- Bethune College, established in 1879.
- City College of Commerce and Business Administration, established in 1879.
- City College, established as Presidency School in 1881.
- Medical College and Hospital, Kolkata, established in 1835, the first college of evidence based medicine in Asia.
- Surendranath College, established in 1882.
- Indian Institute of Social Welfare and Business Management, established in 1953, and affiliated to the University of Calcutta. It is India's first institute offering MBA.

=== Schools ===
- Hindu School, established in 1817.
- Hare School, established in 1818.
- Sanskrit Collegiate School, established in 1824.
- Anglo Arabic Secondary School, established in 1969.

== Gallery ==
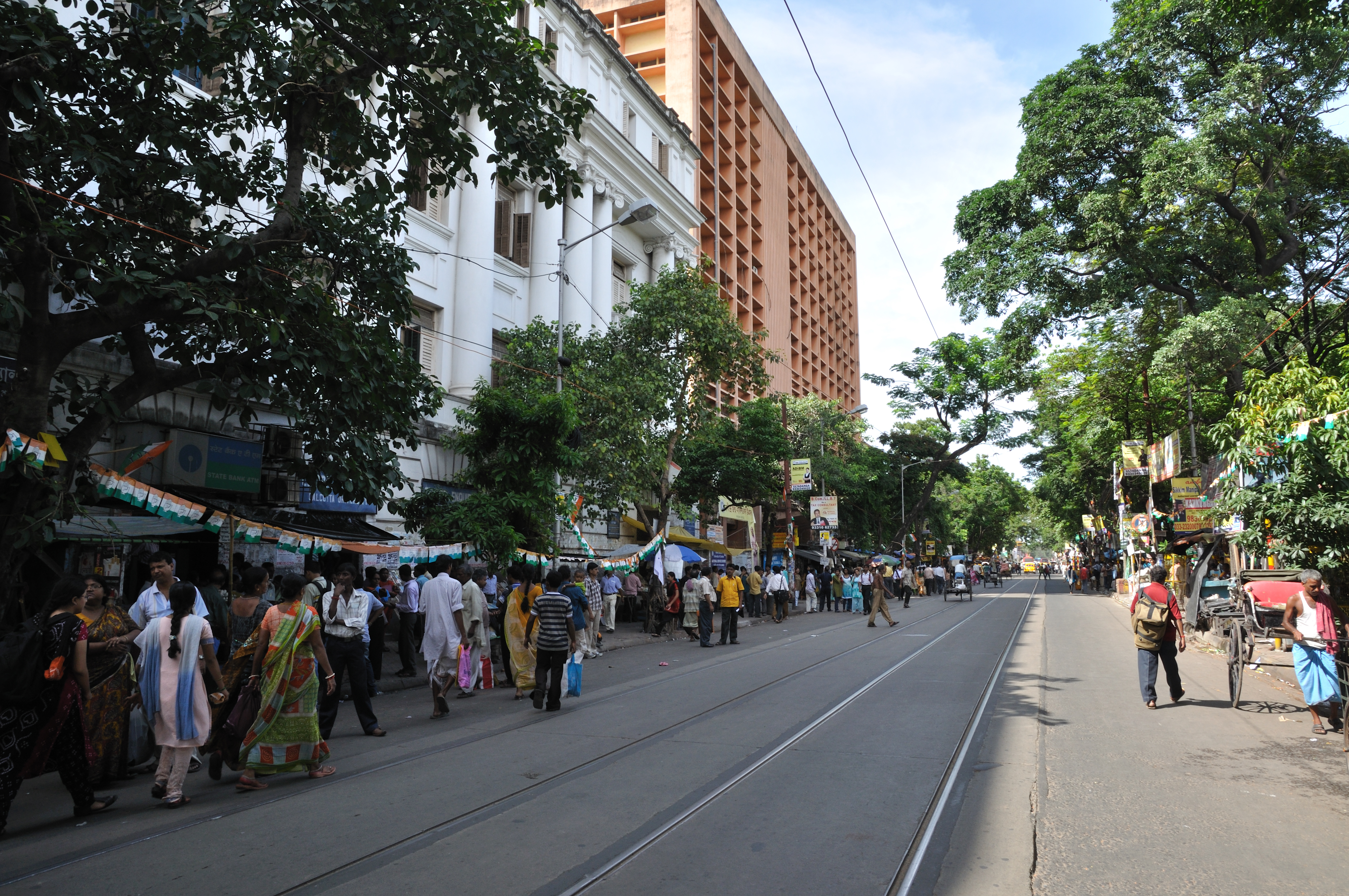
College Street view

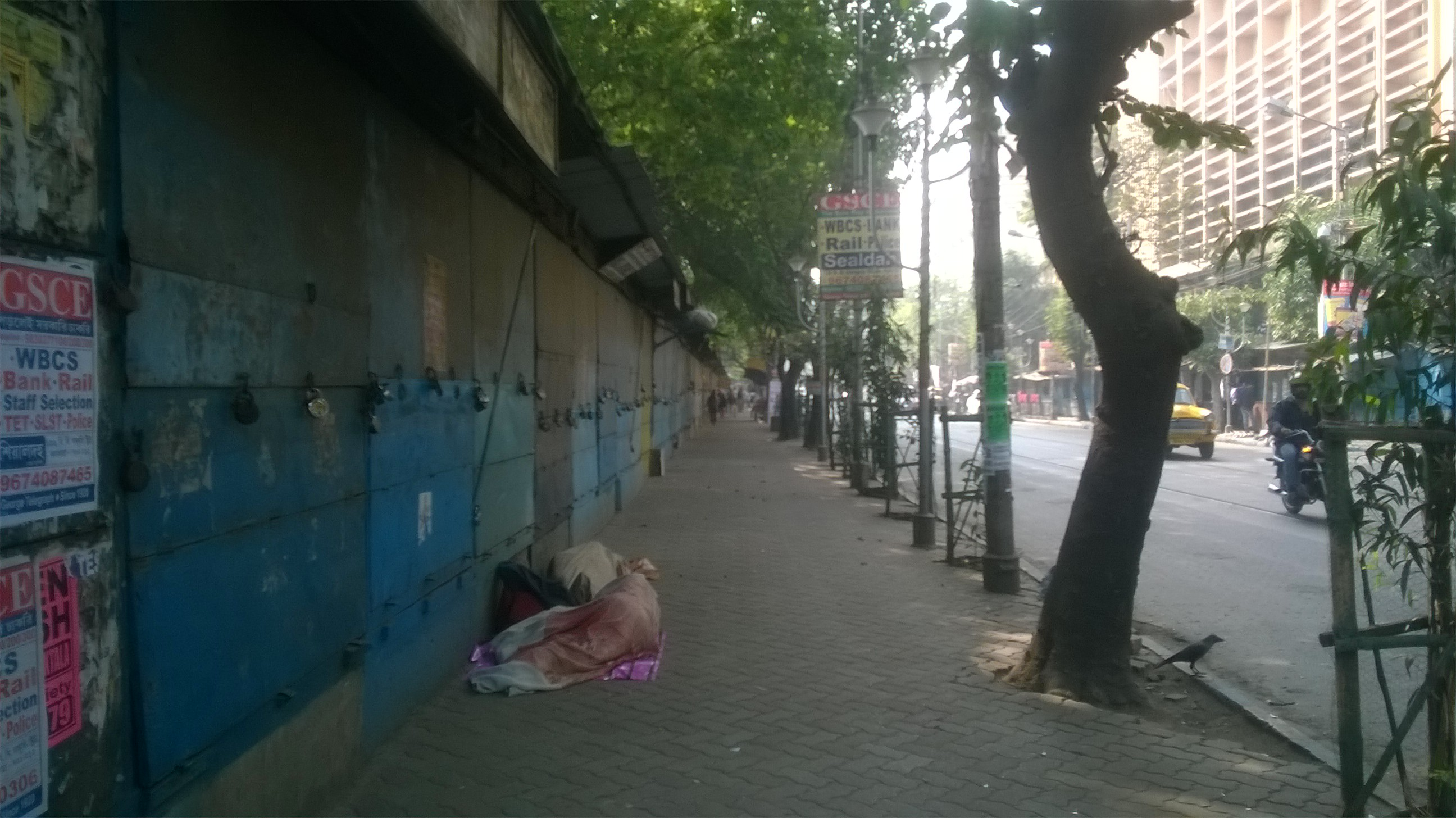
College Street on Holiday

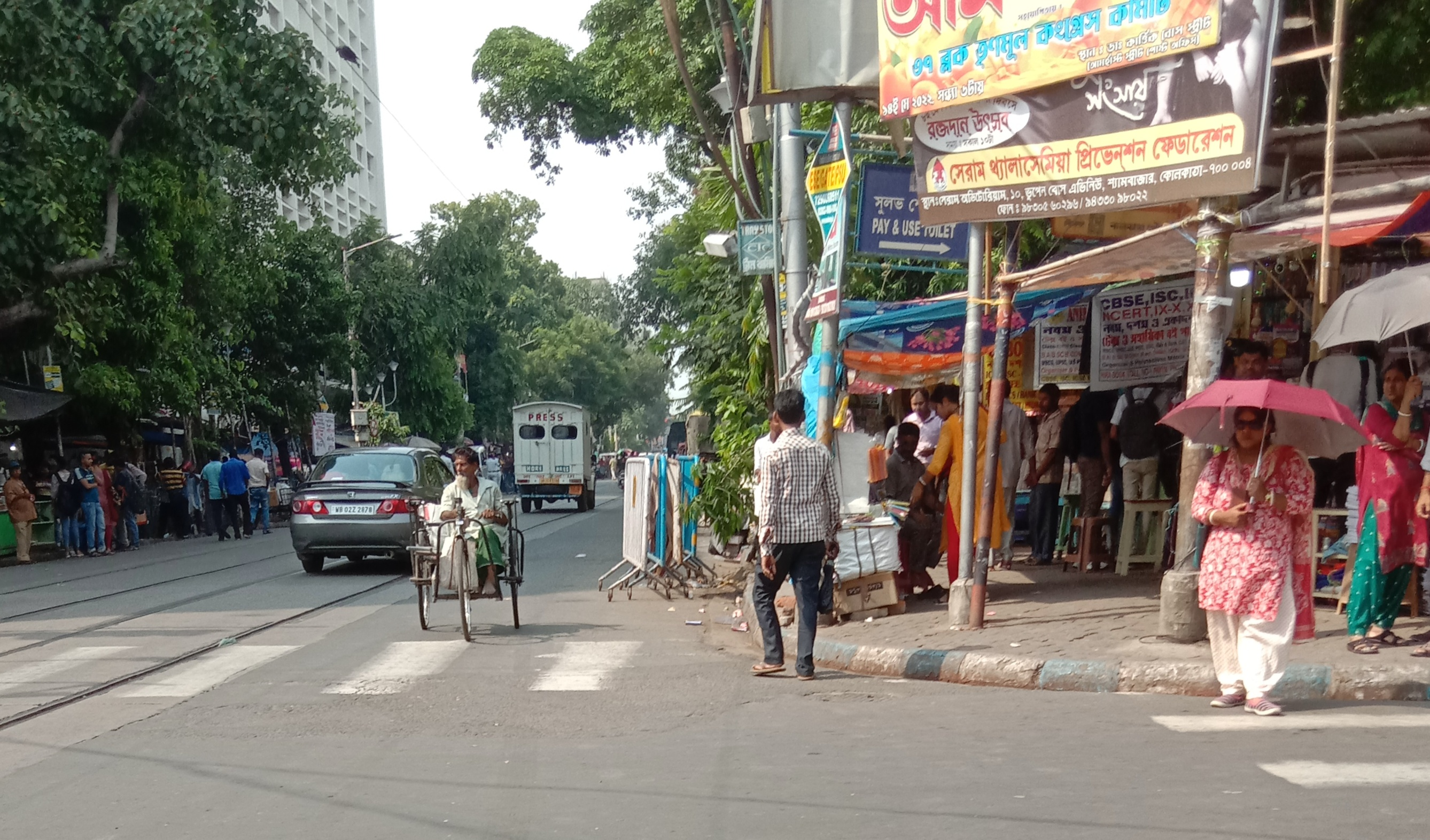
College Street and Surya Sen Street crossing

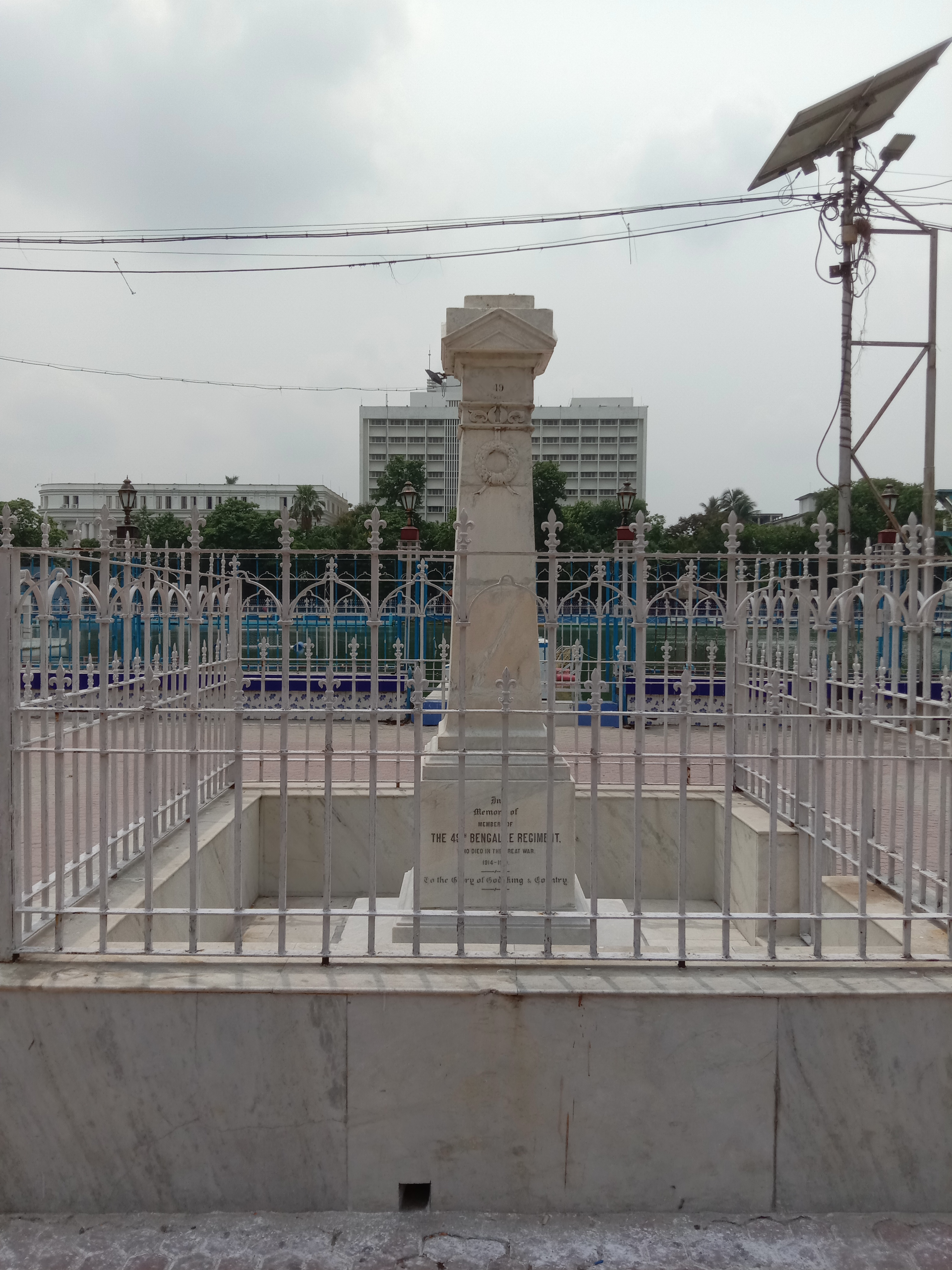
Monument of the 49th Bengalee Regiment (Bangali Platoon) at Vidyasagar Udyan

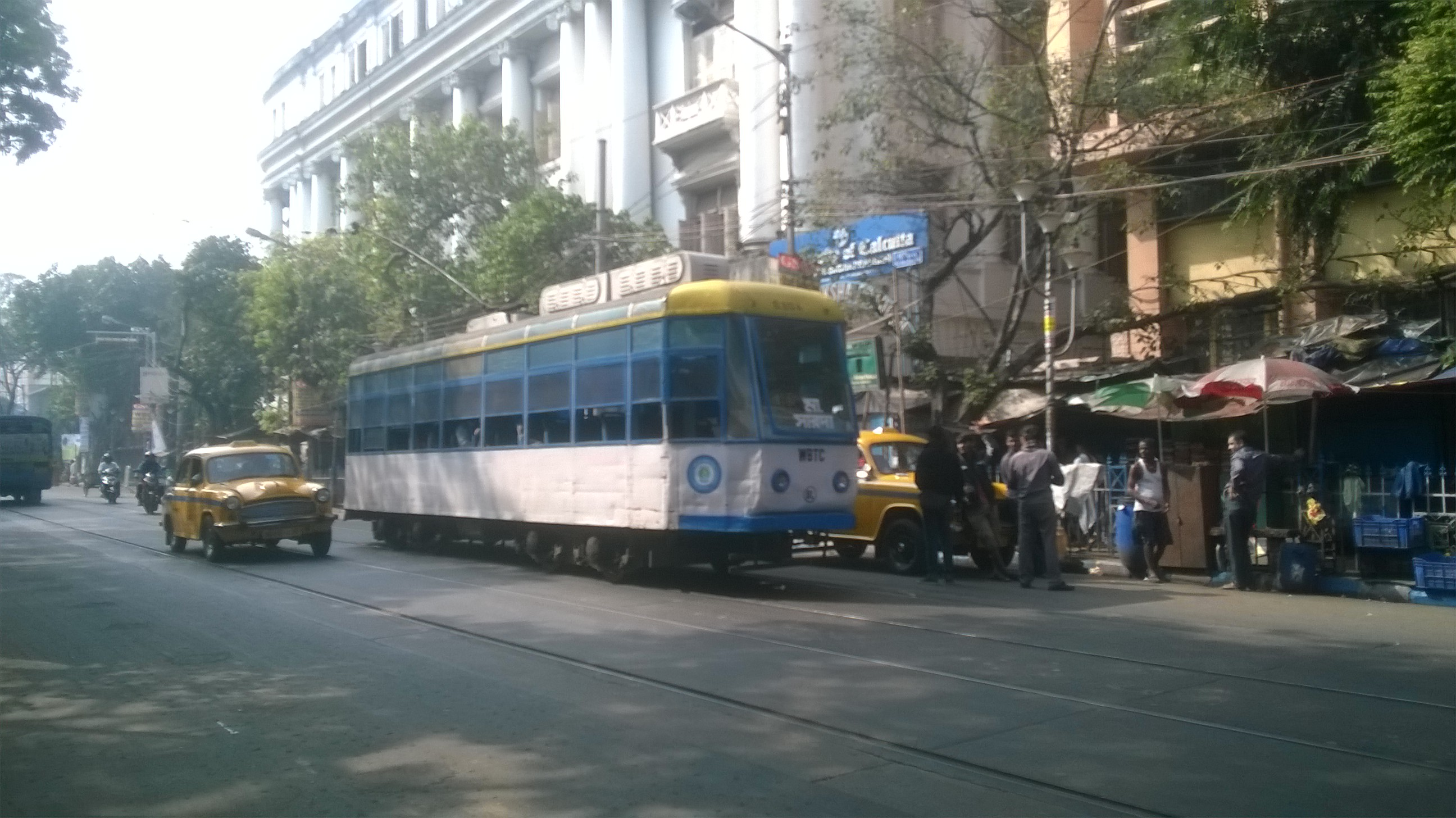
Kolkata Tram route no. 5 on College Street

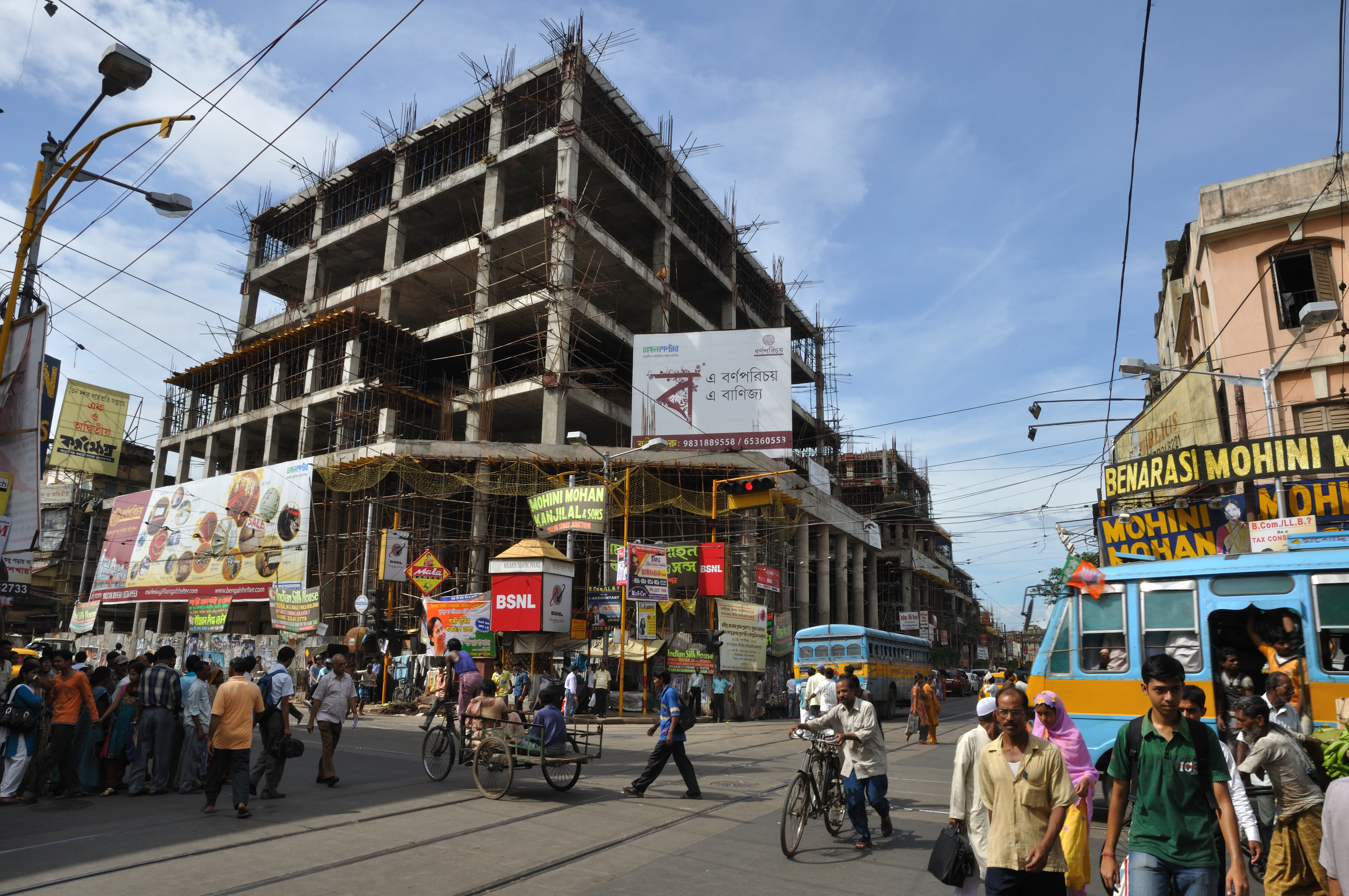
College Street and Mahatma Gandhi Road Crossing

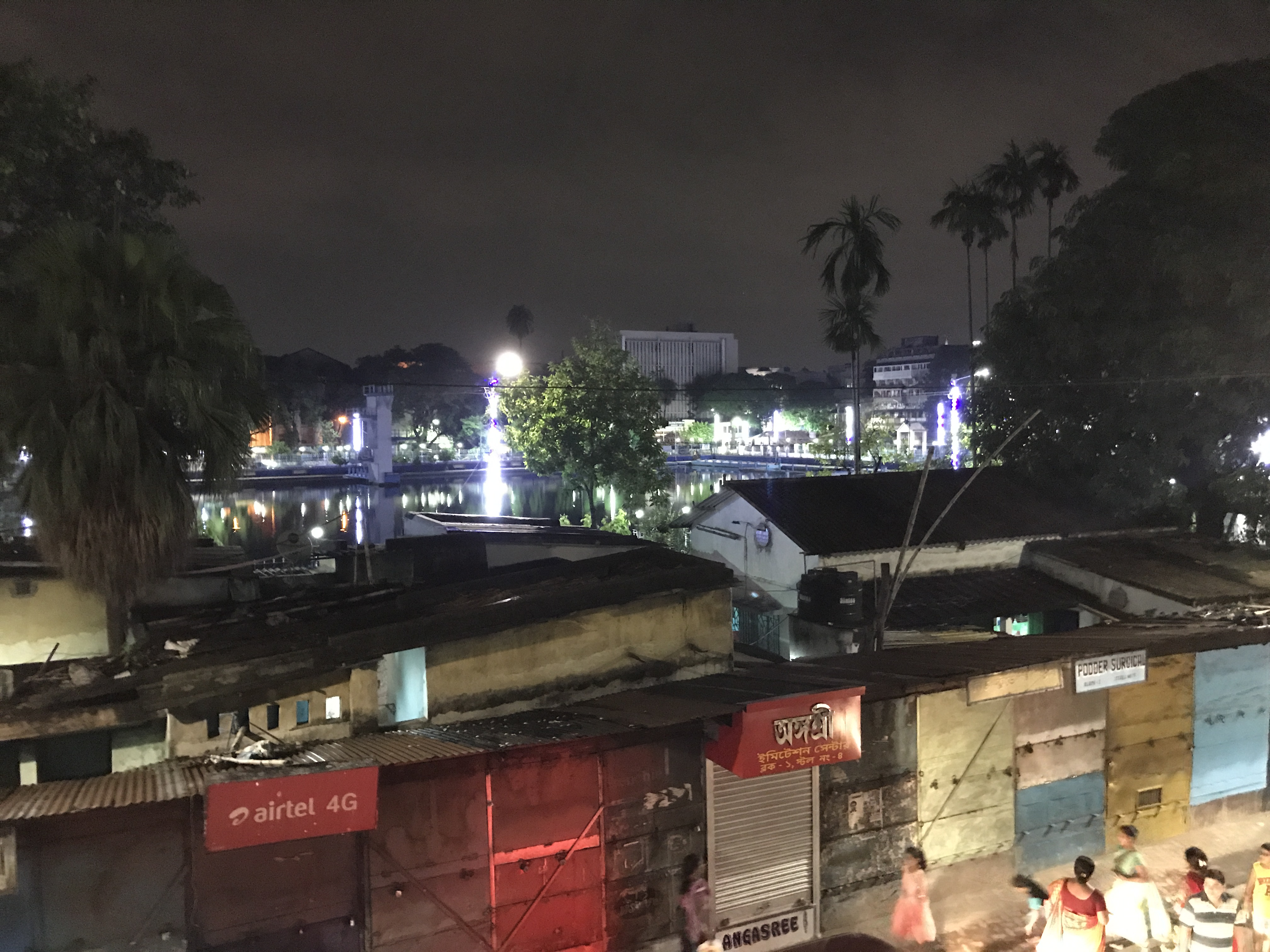
Vidyasagar Udyan at Night

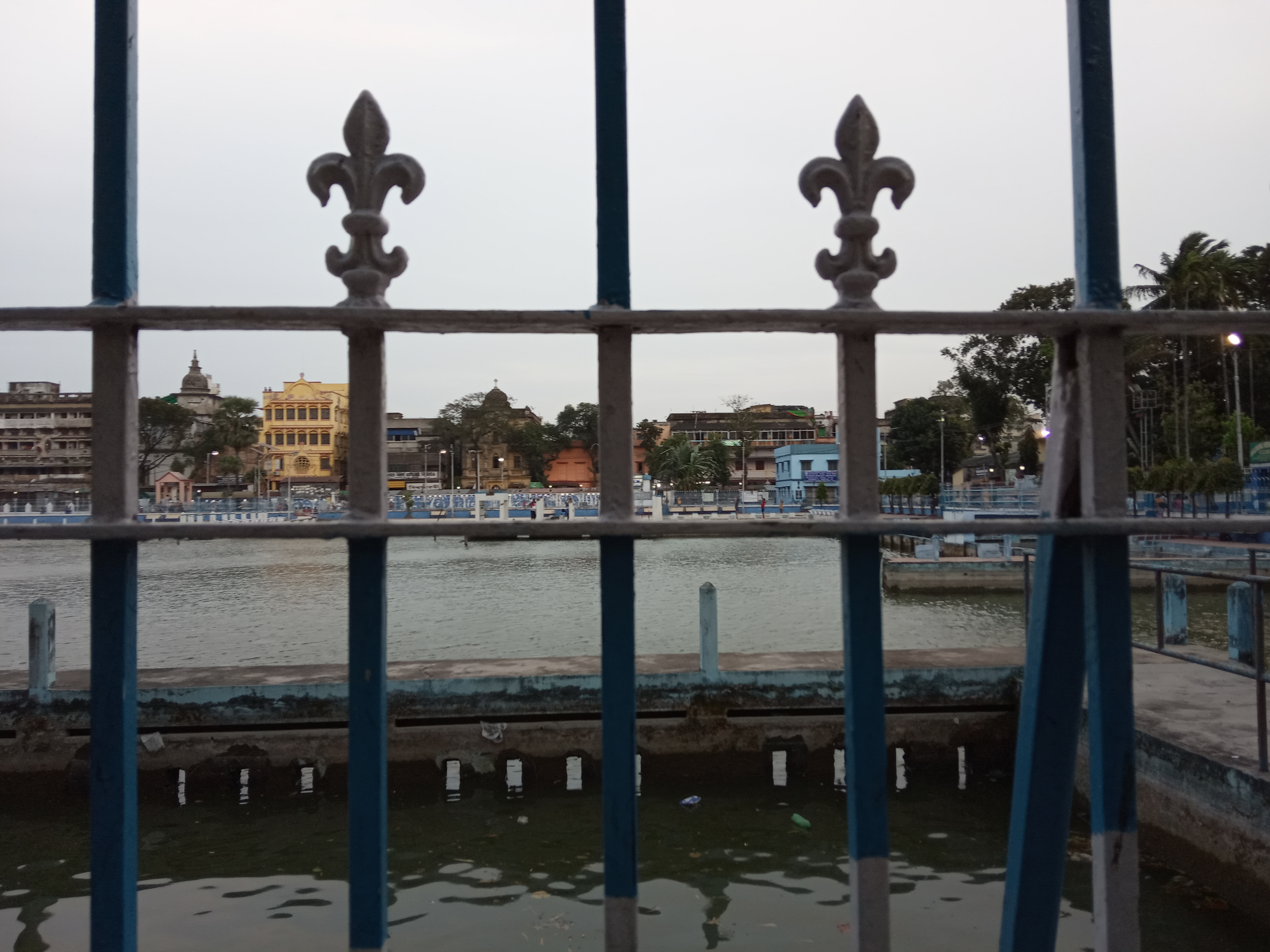
View of Vidyasagar Udyan Swimming Pool

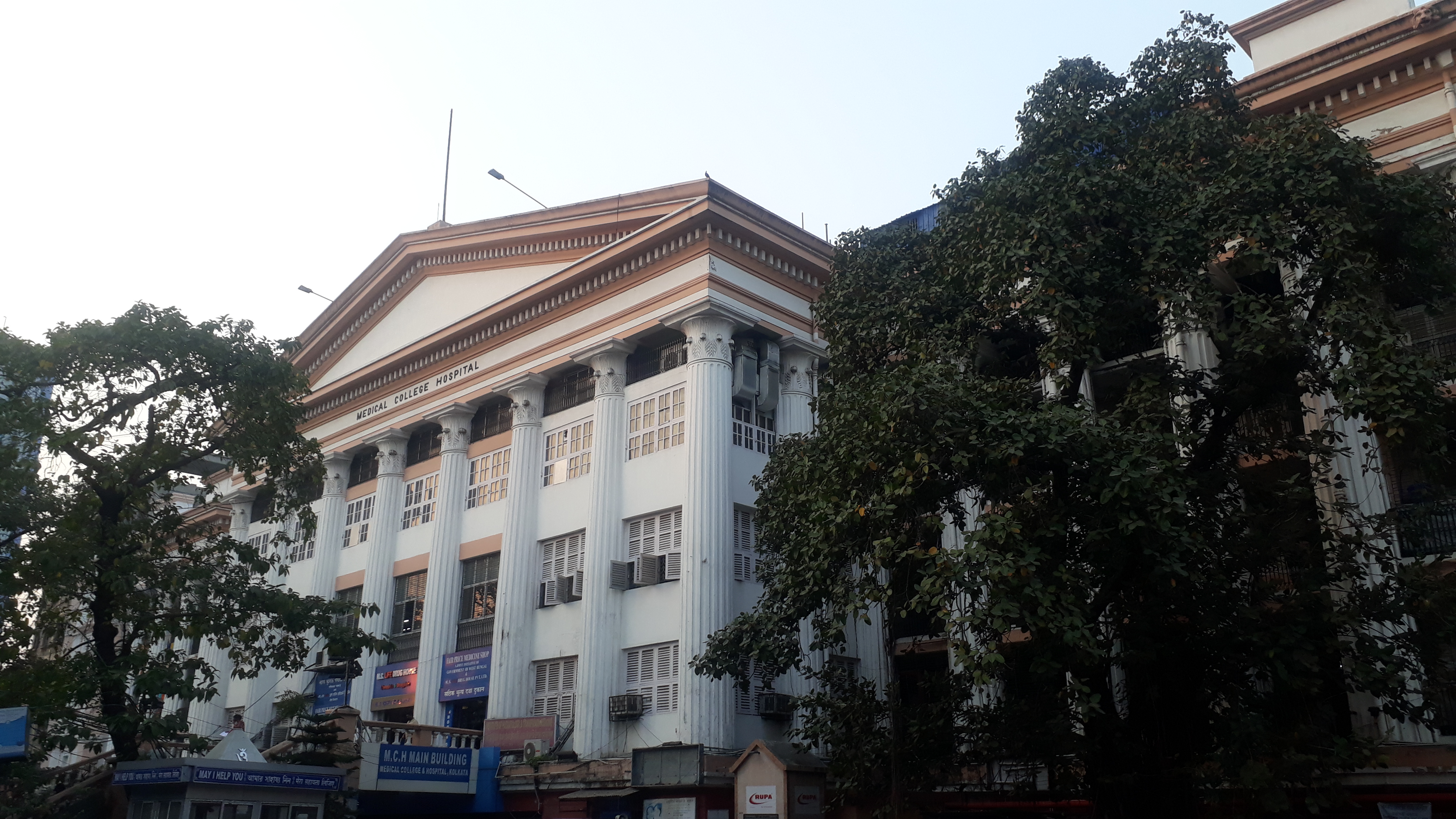
Kolkata Medical College and Hospital main building at College Street

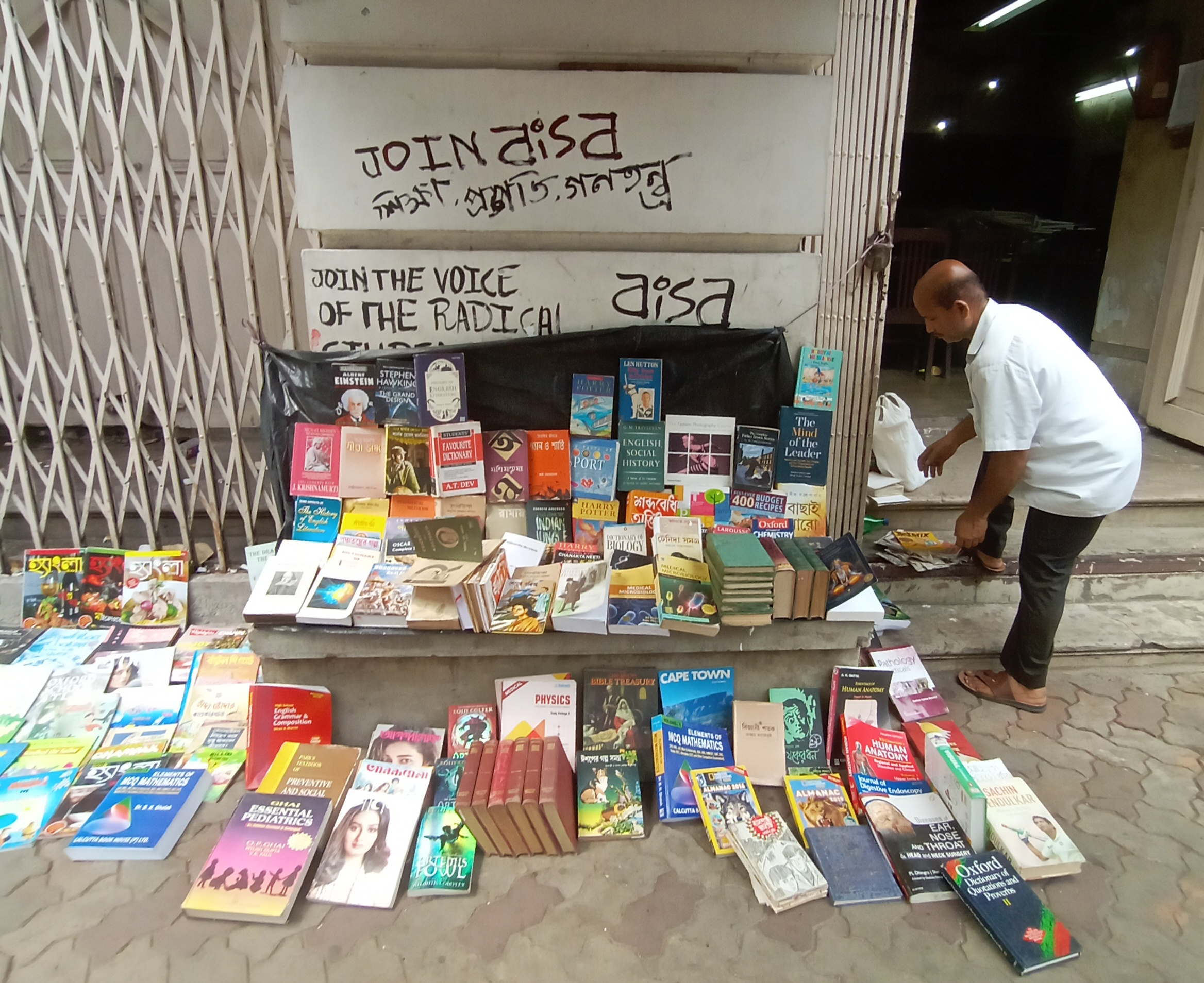
Old second-hand books being sold by a shopkeeper at the College Street

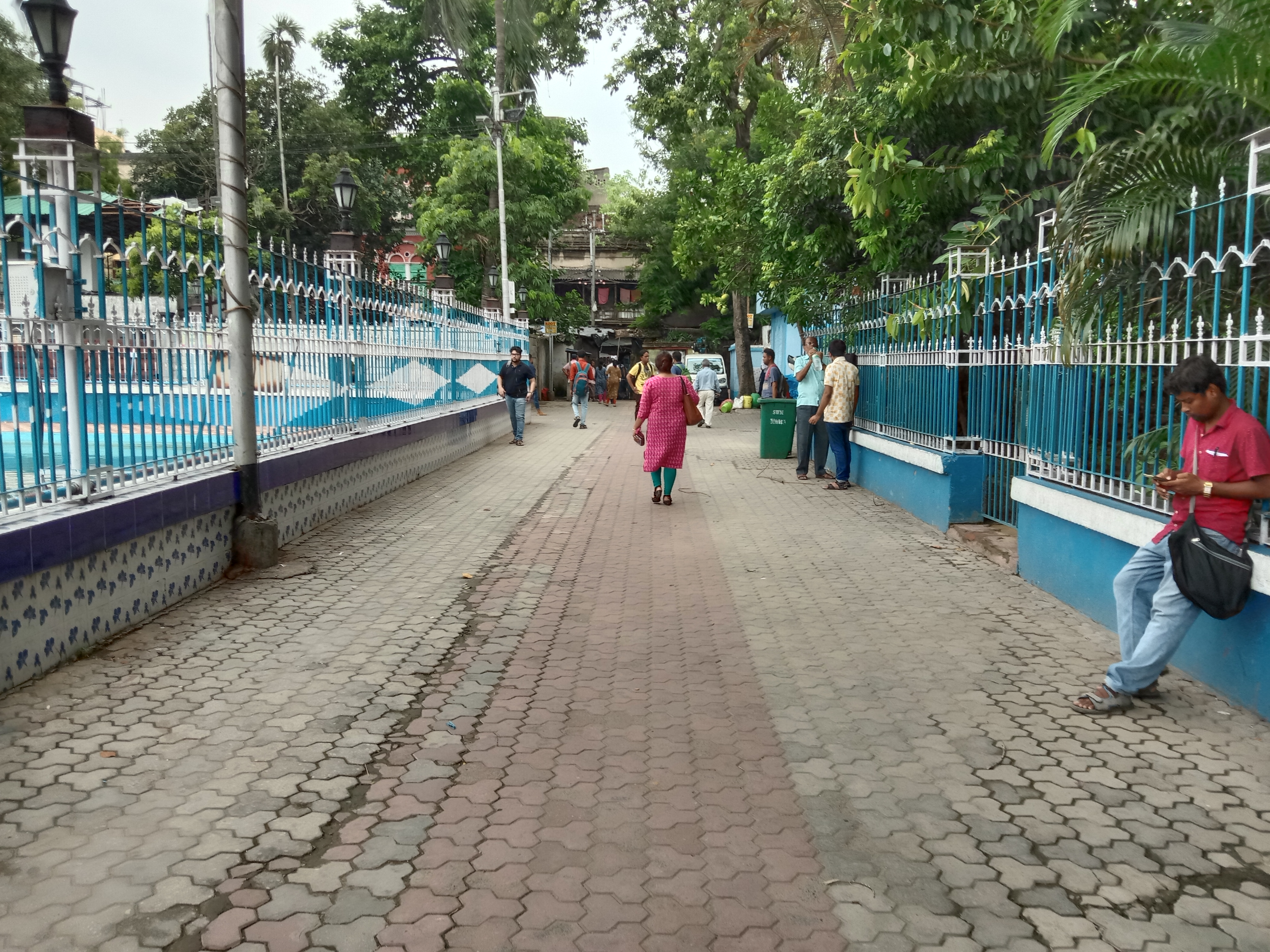
Inside view of Vidyasagar Udyan in Kolkata
