= Sajal Ghosh =

Indian politician (born 1972)

Member of the West Bengal Legislative Assembly
- Incumbent
- Assumed office 4 May 2026
- Preceded by: Sayantika Banerjee (TMC)
- Constituency: Baranagar

Councillor of Kolkata Municipal Corporation
- Incumbent
- Assumed office 21 December 2021
- Preceded by: Mousumi Dey
- Constituency: Ward No. 50

Personal details
- Born: 12 February 1972 (age 54) Sealdah, West Bengal, India
- Party: Bharatiya Janata Party (since 2021)
- Other political affiliations: Trinamool Congress (until 2021); Indian National Congress (till 2012)
- Parent: Pradeep Ghosh
- Education: Bowbazar High School
- Alma mater: City College of Commerce and Business Administration (B.Com)
- Occupation: Politician, Businessman

Sajal Ghosh (born 12 February 1972) is an Indian politician affiliated with the Bhartiya Janata Party (BJP) in West Bengal. He serves as a councillor in the Kolkata Municipal Corporation (KMC) representing Ward No. 50. He eventually won the Baranagar Assembly Constituency in the 2026 West Bengal Legislative Assembly election and is the current MLA of Baranagar.

== Early life and education ==
Ghosh was born in Kolkata to Pradip Ghosh, a veteran Indian National Congress politician and Member of the Mayor in Council at the Kolkata Municipal Corporation. He studied from Baranagar Ramakrishna Mission Ashrama High School. He pursued a Bachelor of Commerce degree from the City College of Commerce and Business Administration, University of Calcutta in 1994.

According to his 2026 election affidavit, Ghosh is a partner at Shovona Medical Foundation, a healthcare organisation based in Kolkata.

Ghosh is also the long term organiser of the famous Santosh Mitra Square Durga Puja in Kolkata and is president of the Santosh Mitra Square Durga Puja Committee.

== Political career ==
Ghosh began his political journey with the Indian National Congress and later joined the All India Trinamool Congress (AITC). In 2021, he switched allegiance to the Bharatiya Janata Party and was elected as a councillor in the Kolkata Municipal Corporation from Ward No. 50. He is also a state media panelist for the BJP in West Bengal.

In March 2024, the BJP announced Ghosh as its candidate for the Baranagar Assembly constituency by-election, which was necessitated by the resignation of former AITC MLA Tapas Roy. Ghosh contested against AITC candidate and actress Sayantika Banerjee. Despite a vigorous campaign, Ghosh was defeated in the by-election held on 1 June 2024.

He won 2026 state election and became MLA from Baranagar on 4th May 2026 defeating Sayantika Banerjee.

== Controversies ==
In December 2021, the Ministry of Home Affairs granted Ghosh 'Y' category security cover due to perceived threats during the KMC elections. The Central Industrial Security Force (CISF) was assigned to provide him with round-the-clock security.

In September 2023, Ghosh was detained along with 76 BJP supporters during a protest at Koley Market in Kolkata. The group was accused of attempting to disrupt normal activities and urging traders to shut their shops as part of a political demonstration.

As of September 2026, Ghosh has 20 criminal cases under his name, as per his election affidavit.

== Personal life ==
Ghosh is married, and his spouse is also a partner at Shovona Medical Foundation. The couple resides in Kolkata. He is a distant uncle of Aditya Narayan Daw. He is related with Bidhan Chandra Roy from maternal side.
