= Nehru Museum of Science and Technology =

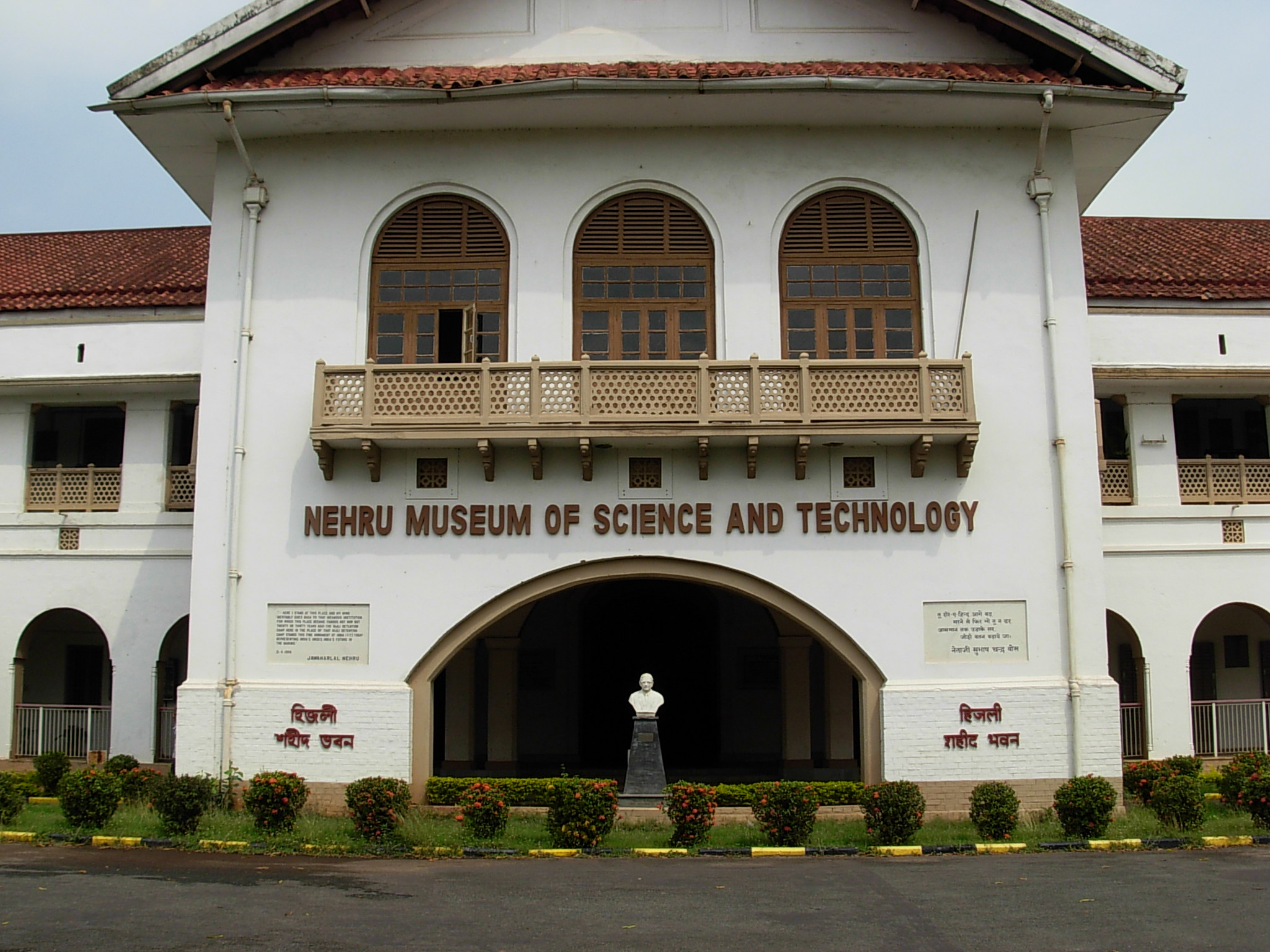
- Established: 1990
- Location: Kharagpur, India
- Coordinates: 22°19′10″N 87°18′56″E

The Nehru Museum of Science and Technology is a museum in Kharagpur, West Bengal, India. It was founded in 1990 at the Hijli Detention camp building, later the IIT-Kharagpur Heritage Building, which is now named as Hijli Saheed Bhavan. The imposing building, bearing resemblance to the Byzantine style of architecture, was used by the British rulers of India to detain the freedom fighters during the 1930s.

== Hijli detention camp and transformation ==
Although there were few other detention camps around the country in those days, the Hijli Detention Camp was the only one to witness the death of two detainees by police firing within jail compound. The incident led to strong protest, including indignation from prominent national figures like Rabindranath Tagore, Subhas Chandra Bose and many others. Soon after Indian independence, the building was used to house the first Indian Institute of Technology (known initially as the Higher Technical Institute).

== Exhibits and features ==
The museum has many indoor exhibits which include technical models collected from various institutes and organisations across India. The park outside the museum contains 14 open-air demonstrations and outdoor exhibits including a hunter plane, and a steam engine. The museum has an archive room showcasing documents relating to history of the institute and Midnapore district.

== See also ==
- Swami Vivekananda Planetarium, Mangalore
