= Santosh Kumar Mitra =

Indian freedom fighter (1900–1931)

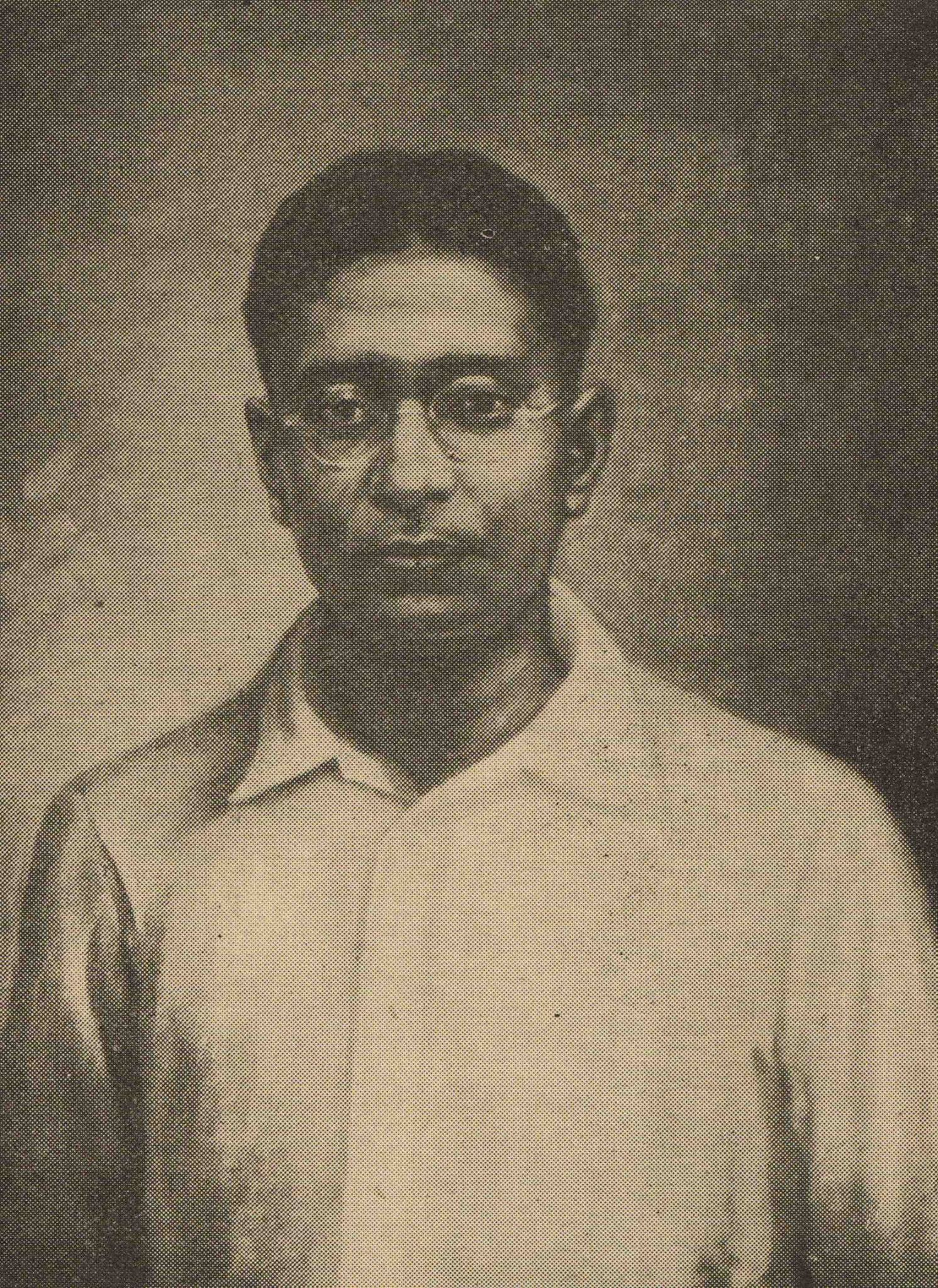
- Born: 15 August 1900; Central Calcutta, British India (now in Kolkata)
- Died: 16 September 1931 (aged 31); Hijli Detention Camp, British India (now in India)
- Organization: Jugantar
- Known for: Role in Indian freedom struggle
- Spouse: Jyotsna Mitra
- Father: Durga Charan Mitra

Santosh Kumar Mitra (Bengali: সন্তোষ কুমার মিত্র) or Santosh Mitra (15 August 1900 – 16 September 1931) was an activist of the Indian independence movement and a martyr.

== Early life ==
Mitra was born on 15 August 1900 in Kolkata, in a middle class Bengali Kayastha family. He passed matriculation from Hindu School, Kolkata in 1915 and became graduate from the University of Calcutta in 1919. During the period 1921–22, he completed his M.A and LL.B.

== Revolutionary activities ==
Mitra joined the Indian National Congress. He founded the Swaraj Sevak Sangha and was attached with Hooghly Vidya Mandir which was headed by Bhupati Majumder, one of the Jugantar Leaders in 1922. He organised a Socialist conference in Kolkata in the presidency of Jawaharlal Nehru. After the suspension of Non-cooperation movement Mitra shifted to the extremist movement in the struggle for Independence. He was charged with Shankharitola Murder Case and arrested in 1923.

== Death ==
On 16 September 1931, police shot and killed Mitra and another inmate Tarakeswar Sengupta in Hijli Detention Camp.

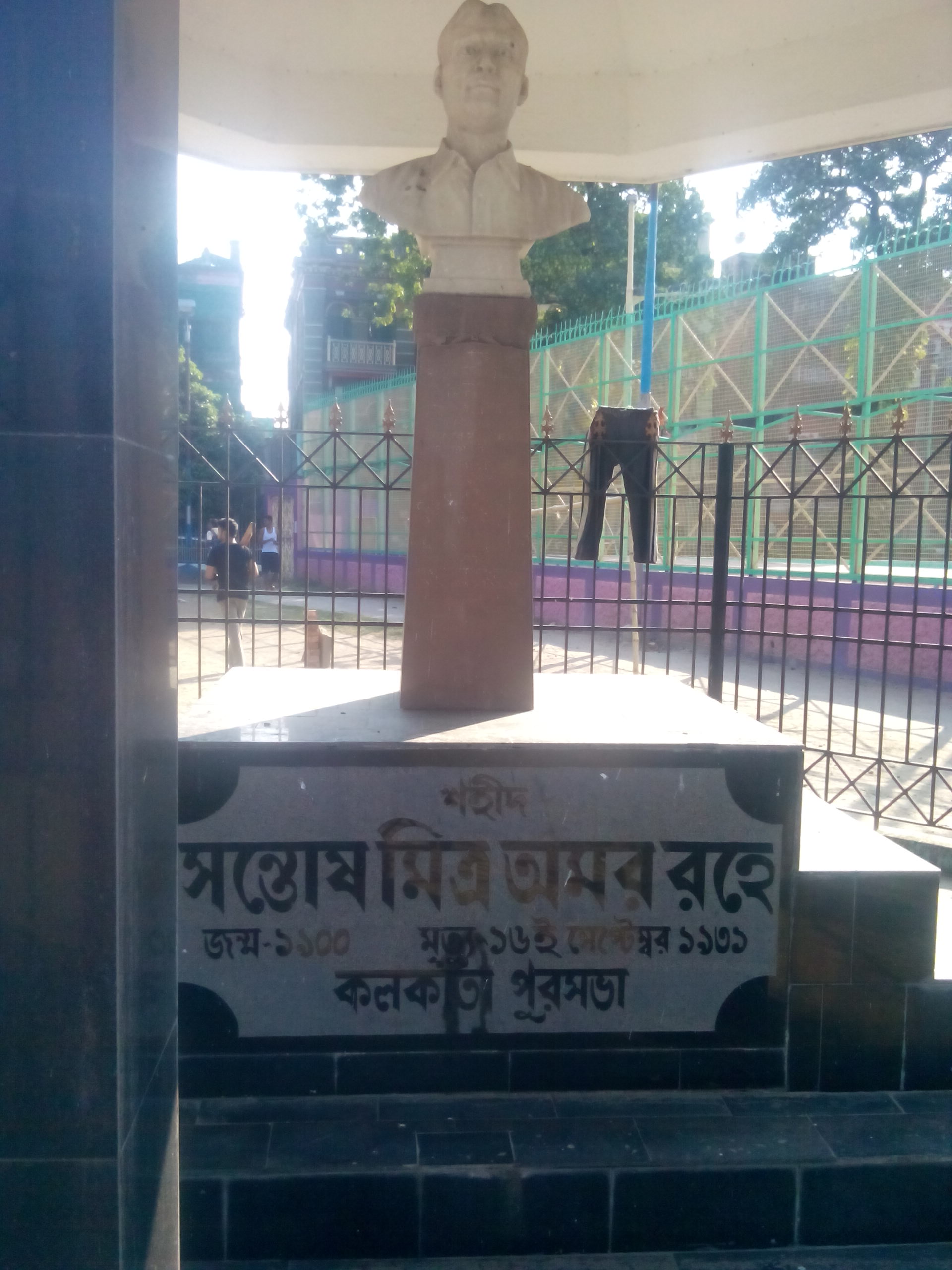
Santosh Kumar Mitra bust

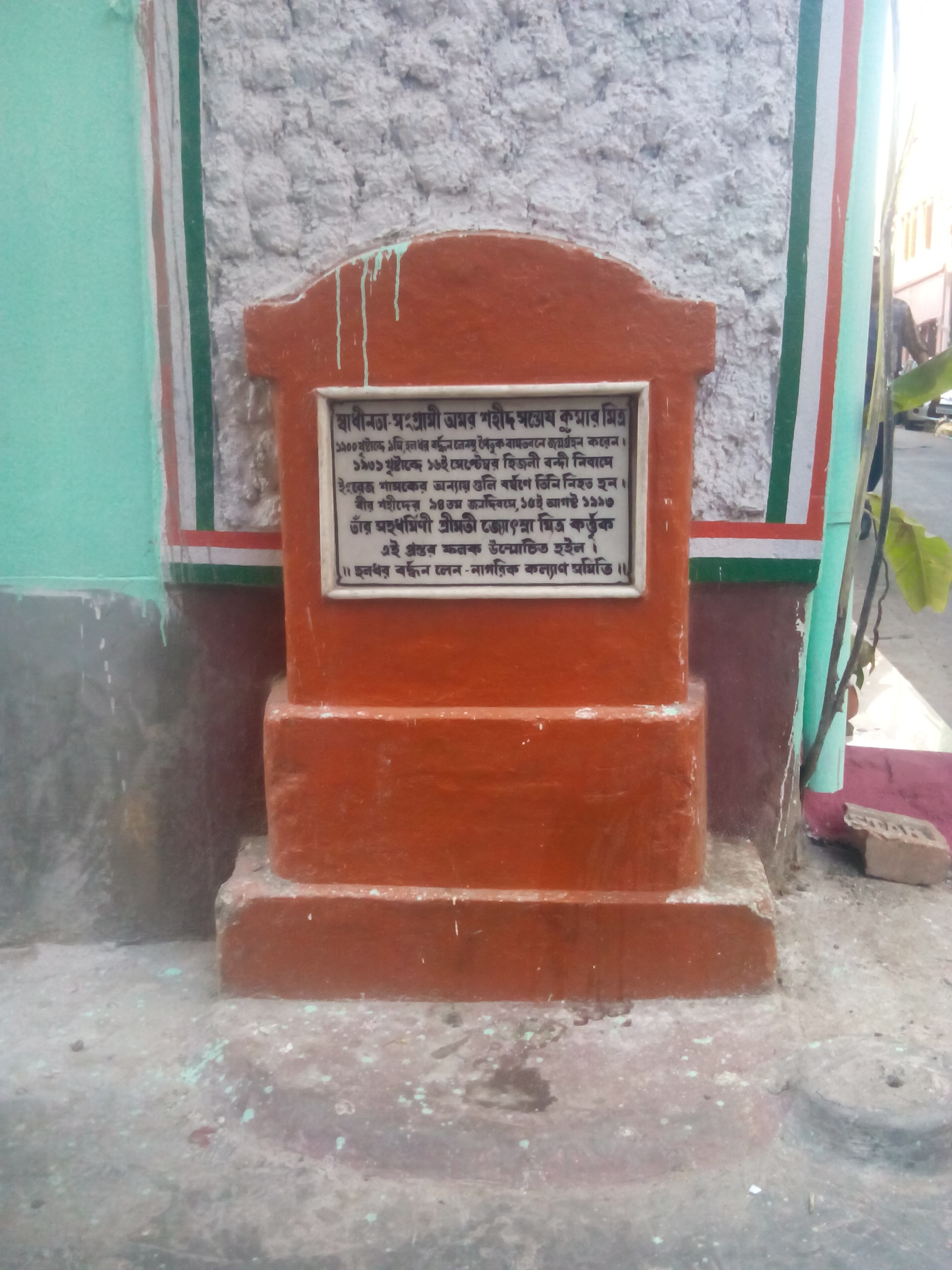
Santosh Kumar Mitra

== Legacy ==
Santosh Mitra Square, the famous park in Kolkata is named after him. The location is also well-known as the venue of a high-profile Durga Puja.
