= Hijli Detention Camp =

Detention camp of British India

Coordinates: 22.319209°N 87.316099°E

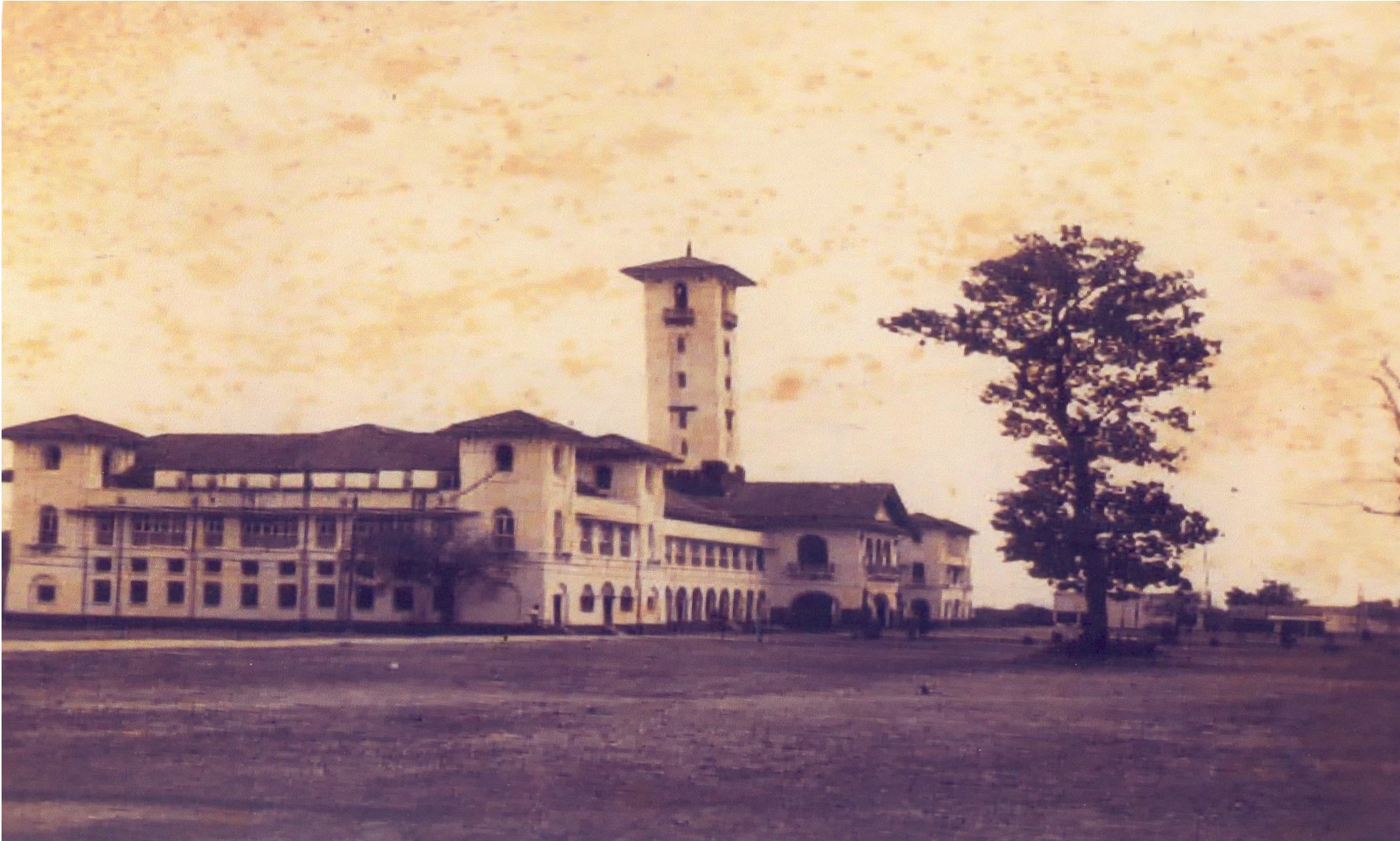
The administrative building of Hijli Detention Camp (September 1951)

Hijli Detention Camp (now called Shaheed Bhavan, IIT Kharagpur), is a former detention camp operated during the period of British colonial rule in India. It is located in Hijli, beside Kharagpur (a part of former Hijli Kingdom), in the district of Midnapore West, West Bengal, India.

== History ==
The Hijli Detention Camp played a significant role in the Indian independence movement of the 19th and 20th centuries. The large numbers of those who participated in armed struggles or the non-cooperation movement against the British could not be accommodated in ordinary jails. The British colonial government decided to establish a few detention camps; the first one was located in Buxa Fort followed by the creation of Hijli Detention Camp in 1930. A significant moment in the Indian independence movement occurred at here in 1931 when two unarmed detainees, Santosh Kumar Mitra and Tarakeswar Sengupta, were shot dead by the Indian Imperial Police. Subhas Chandra Bose came to Hijli to collect their bodies for interment. Many Indian nationalists, including Nobel laureate Rabindranath Tagore, voiced strong protests against the British Raj over this incident. The firing which later known as "Hijli firing" is the only incident of police firing inside a detention camp.

The detention camp was closed in 1937 and was reopened in 1940. In 1942 it was closed for the final time and the detainees were transferred elsewhere. During the Second World War it was occupied by the US Air Force. Today, the camp is also known for being the birthplace of Indian Institute of Technology – Kharagpur, which started in 1951.

== Facilities ==
The former detention camp now houses the Nehru Museum of Science and Technology, which occupies the original prison blocks and displays indoor scientific exhibits, including technical models loaned by national research institutes and an archive room of historical documents related to the camp and India's freedom struggle. Its surrounding park features fourteen open‑air exhibits, notably a retired Hawker Hunter fighter aircraft and a steam locomotive, illustrating mid‑20th‑century Indian technological and industrial heritage.

Adjacent to the museum, the heritage‑listed Hijli Shaheed Bhavan retains the camp's two‑storey Byzantine style facade, stone‑flagged corridors and central watchtower, preserved as a memorial to detainees and martyrs. A separate women's jail block is currently under restoration funded in 2017 by IIT Kharagpur and the state government with plans to convert it into a dedicated museum space honoring female freedom fighters from the Midnapore region.
