= Tarakeswar Sengupta =

Bengali revolutionary

Tarakeshwar Sengupta
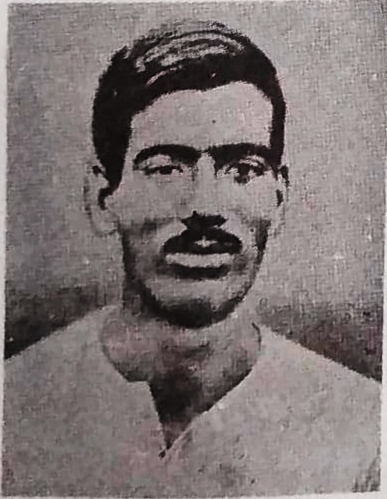
- Sahid Tarakeswar Sengupta
- Born: 15 April 1905; Gaila village, Bengal Presidency, British India
- Died: 16 September 1931 (aged 26); Hijli Detention Camp, British India (now in India)
- Known for: Role in Indian freedom struggle

Tarakeshwar Sengupta (Bengali: তারকেশ্বর সেনগুপ্ত, 15 April 1905 – 16 September 1931) was an Indian independence activist who took part in the Chittagong Armoury Raid. He was a member of revolutionary group of Masterda Surya Sen.

== Early life ==
Sengupta was born on 15 April 1905 in Gaila village of Barisal District, British India at present Bangladesh, in a Bengali middle-class family. He was inspired with the idea of patriotism in his family environment.

== Revolutionary activities ==
Tarakeshwar Sengupta was a social workers. Connected with the Gaila branch of the Jugantar, he was also attached with the Sankar Math and Gaila Sevasram. Sengupta was arrested and imprisoned for a few months. He joined the Salt Satyagraha and was again arrested in D.I rule and sent to Hijli Jail.

== Death ==
On 16 September 1931 police shot and killed Tarakeshwar Sengupta along with Santosh Kumar Mitra in Hijli Detention Camp.
