= City College of Commerce and Business Administration =

Undergraduate college in Kolkata, India

City College of Commerce & Business Administration
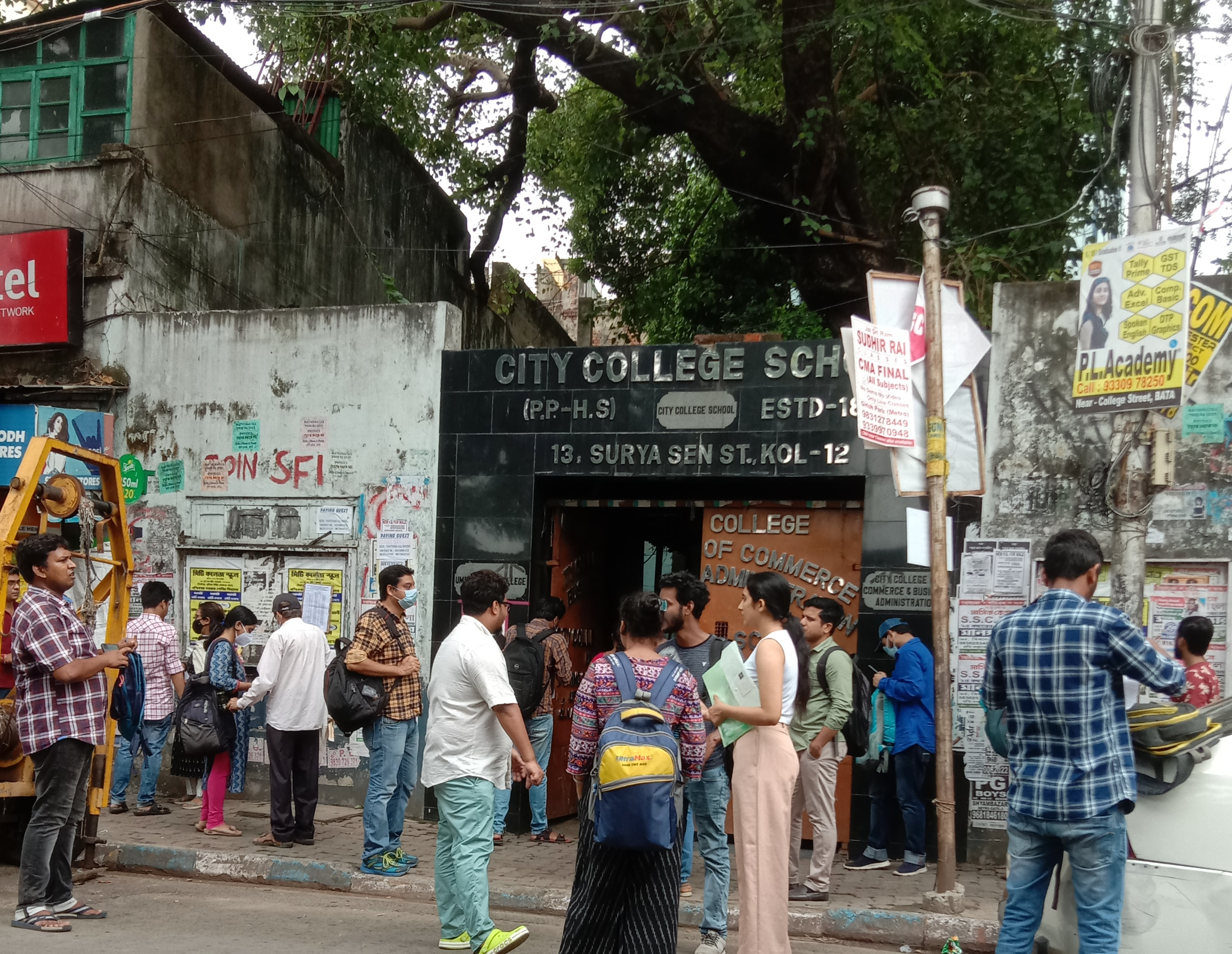
- The college entrance in May 2022
- Type: Undergraduate college
- Established: 6 January 1879; 147 years ago
- Affiliations: University of Calcutta
- President: Vivek Gupta
- Principal: Dr. Pinaki Ranjan Bhattacharyya
- Location: 13, Surya Sen St, Lalbajar, College Square, Kolkata, West Bengal, 700012, India; 22.5738188°N 88.3637211°E
- Campus: Urban
- Website: www.cccba.ac.in
- Location within Kolkata Location within India

The City College of Commerce & Business Administration is an undergraduate commerce college in Kolkata, India. It is affiliated with the University of Calcutta. It was established in 1961 by the Brahmo Arya Samaj Society, offering only B.COM Honours & Pass with a specialization in Accountancy & Finance/Marketing programmes for undergraduates. It is an Only Boys Evening College.

== History ==
The present-day City College started as City School, founded on 6 January 1879, by the Sadharan Brahmo Samaj. It was raised at a college in 1881. B.A.Classes were introduced in 1884; a Law Department came up in 1885, and M.A. classes were introduced and conducted until the new regulations of Calcutta University terminated them.

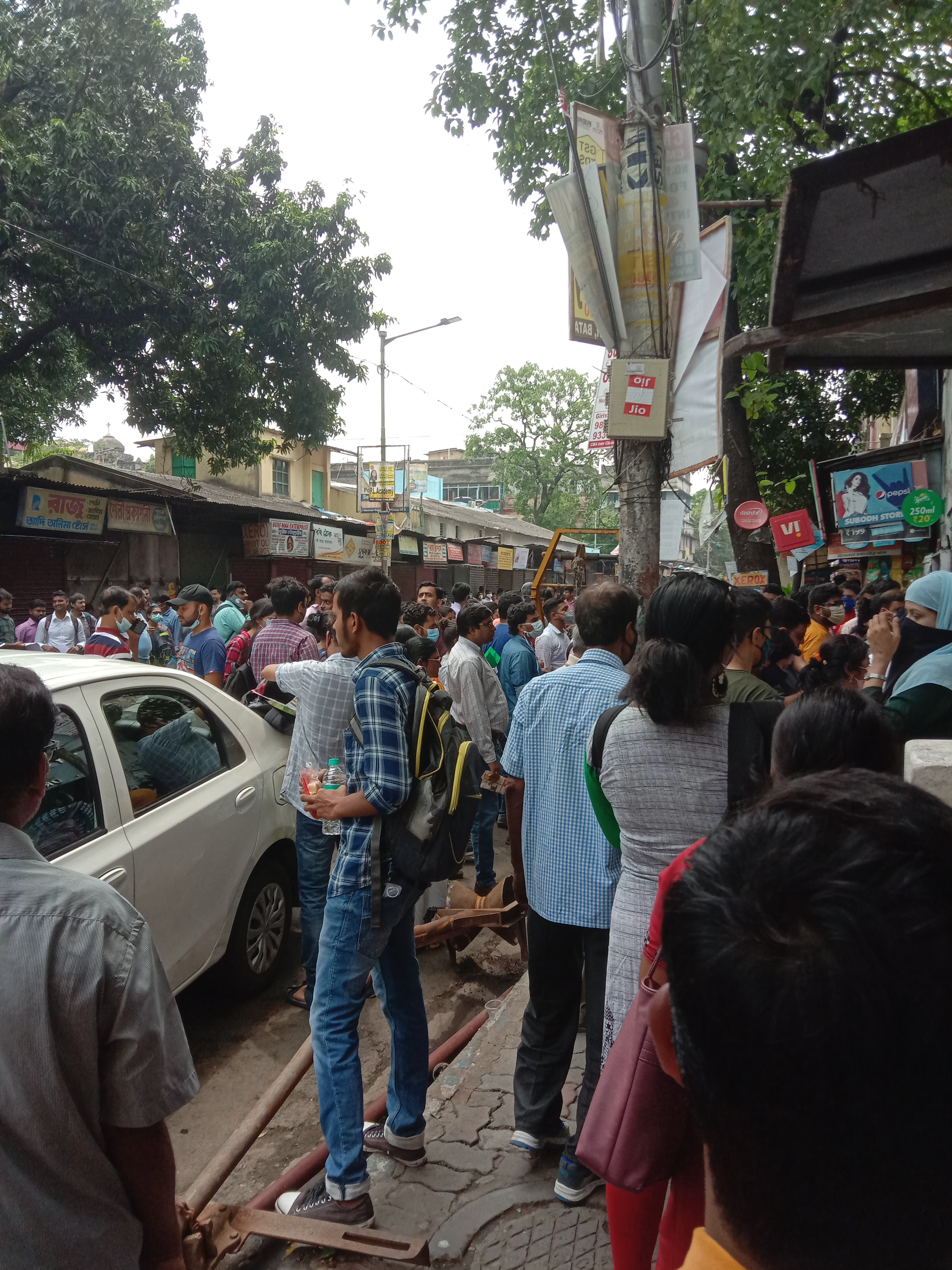
A crowd of candidates before an examination of Kolkata Municipal Corporation at the campus of City College of Commerce and Business Administration in Surya Sen Street, Kolkata, May 29, 2022.

Initially, the college was housed in an old building, but afterwards it was shifted to another old house at 13, Mirzapur Street (now Surya Sen Street). A new building was erected in its place, opened by Lord Ripon, Governor-general of India, in 1884. In 1905, the college was brought under the control of a society called 'The City College Institution', now known as the 'Brahmo Samaj Education Society', whose chief objective was to promote the cause of education as an all-encompassing process to contribute towards the all-round development and well-being of the human community.

The City College Commerce Department came up in 1939 (18.07.1939) in response to the large-scale demand among the youth of the time for quality university education in commerce. In 1940, a Commercial Bureau was set up, and in 1945, the Department of Commerce and Business Administration was formally organized. The college got affiliated with the University of Calcutta in 1961, and was also officially recognized by University Grants’ Commission in the same year under the U.G.C. Act [Section 2(f)].

== Relation with Brahmo Samaj ==
The first phase of the history of the Brahmo Samaj is inextricably associated with the name of Raja Rammohan Roy (1772–1833). The Brahmo Samaj, launched on 20 August 1828, gave a concrete expression to his concept of universal worship. Their liberal approach is reflected in the fact that they arranged to have the Upanishads read and explained before the entire body of worshippers, which, besides the non-Brahmins, sometimes included Christians and Muslims.

After the departure of Raja Rammohan Roy for England (November 1830) and his death there (September 1833), the Brahmo Samaj as an organization faced a severe crisis for survival. However, the selfless efforts of Dwarakanath Tagore and Pandit Ram Chandra Vidyavagis enabled the Samaj to tide over the crisis. After founding the Tattwabodhini Sabha in 1839, Debendranath Tagore joined the Samaj in 1842 and it became the common platform for the intellectual and cultural elite of the mid-19th century Bengal. The era of the Tattwabodhini Sabha (1839–1859) thus marks a creative phase in the history of the Brahmo Samaj.

The Brahmo Movement gained further momentum when the dynamic Keshab Chandra Sen (1838–84) joined the Samaj in 1857. However, serious differences regarding ideology and attitude cropped up between Debendranath and Keshab. It came to a head at the close of 1866 with the emergence of two bodies, the Calcutta, or Adi Brahmo Samaj, and the Brahmo Samaj of India. A number of radical and far-reaching social reforms like female education and the total eradication of class distinctions led to the formation of the Indian Reform Association in 1870 and the enactment of the Indian Marriage Act, initially drafted as the Brahmo Marriage Act, in 1872, which validated inter-caste marriage. Again, Keshab's reverence for all faiths allowed him to achieve a rich synthesis of all religions, which he proclaimed under the title of 'New Dispensation' (Navavidhan) on 25 January 1880.

In spite of all such developments, a second schism took place in the Samaj in May 1878, when a band of Keshab Chandra Sen's followers left him to start Sadharon Brahmo Samaj. Led by Shiv Chandra Deb, the body consisted of some brilliant names like Sivanath Sastri, Ananda Mohan Bose, Vijay Krishna Goswami and others. It has proved till now a powerful branch of the Bramho Samaj in India. Presently both the wings, viz., the Brahmo Samaj of India and the Sadharan Brahmo Samaj, contribute immensely to the well-being and needs of the entire Brahmo community in India.

== Faculties, departments and courses ==
City College of Commerce & Business Administration is affiliated with the University of Calcutta at the undergraduate level. A college dedicated exclusively to commerce-oriented studies, it neither has the scope nor the required space to include disciplines other than commerce. The major course offered to the students is Honours in Accountancy (encompassing a wide area of subjects as prescribed by Calcutta University). General papers are however, offered to those who choose not to pursue the Honours course with a view to going into other related areas of study in future. Apart from this, there are the departments of Economics, Mathematics and Law along with the usual language departments like Bengali, Hindi and English.

== Infrastructure / facilities ==
=== Office timings ===
All classes commence from 4:30 p.m. and give over at 9:00 p.m. The Administrative Office operates between 2:30 p.m. and 8:30 p.m., while the Cash Section operates between 4:30 p.m. and 7:30 p.m. Other departments and sections start working in tandem to effectively help the students and meet their requirements.

=== Classrooms ===
The classrooms are commodious enough to accommodate 150 students each. They occupy the upper storeys of the Main as well as the Annexe buildings, i.e. the 2nd, 3rd and 4th floors of the college.

=== Library ===
The college library houses a collection of text, reference books, and reading materials in commerce, literature, social studies, philosophy, and other disciplines. Journals available cover subjects within and beyond the conventional academic ambit. The library room, which also functions as a reading room, contains books of varied academic specialization. The recent overhaul of Calcutta University’s Commerce syllabus has resulted in an anticipated thorough restructuring of its catalogue; while digitalization is being prioritized in order to facilitate the ease of use of library facilities.

=== Computer room ===
The college has an exclusive computer room for practical classes.

=== Audio-visual room ===
The college has recently opened and introduced its audio-visual room to the students, which has started hosting classes with the help of projectors and slides to help them delve deeper into what they get to study in books. Besides, this room will be revamped in due course to enable the institution to conduct seminars and symposia, the announcements of which will be made in the regular updates of the website.

=== Job placement cell ===
The college is shortly going to open a job placement cell, the details of which will feature in the future updates of the Website.

=== Financial assistance granted to students ===
Apart from looking after the academic requirements of the students, the college attends to the students who are financially worse off, or those who are badly in need of some financial grant from the college. Keeping such matters in view, the college administration has set up departments in the office, which directly address these problems by adopting different methods like granting free studentship, exemption of payment for a particular session, extending financial aid to the truly needy and the like. In this connection, the StudentsA id Fund plays an important role.

=== Prizes, certification and scholarship ===
Students, who obtain high marks in B.Com., are awarded prizes in the form of books. Students participating in state-level competitions in the fields of study, sports and the like, are given awards and certificates as incentives on a regular basis. The J.N.Dutta Memorial Fund and the R.N.Saha Endowment Fund are constituted especially for this purpose.

== Campus life and activities ==
=== Students' union ===
The college has a well-organized students' union. The members of the union are class representatives who are elected by the general students of the college. The union actively takes part in games and sports and other social and cultural activities of the college and performs a positive function in communicating the cause of the students to the college administration

=== NSS ===
The college has an NSS unit organized as per the guidelines formulated by Calcutta University. Constituted under the supervision of a qualified teacher, it plays a crucial role in conducting social awareness programmes and camps, as well as involving students in such melioristic activities like slum development and literacy drives. Recently the unit has successfully conducted a cataract detection as well as operation camp in expert collaboration with the Shankara Netralaya, and thus helped a number of needy and ailing people. It is also likely to figure in some useful collaboration in near future the information of which will be communicated through the regular updates of the website.

=== Seminars and workshops ===
The college has organized seminars attended by eminent scholars on commerce-oriented subjects as well as areas of general interest. It has also arranged career-oriented lecture programs as well as counselling programs by prominent concerns linked to management studies, information technology and the print media. A series of such interactive programs is on the anvil.

=== Games and sports ===
An encouraging patron of sports and games, the college organizes both indoor and outdoor competitions on a regular basis. The Annual Sports is a massive whole-day program at the Calcutta University grounds. Apart from organizing various intra-college tournaments, the college regularly participates in several inter-college university and state-level tournaments and Athletic Meets. In year 2001-2002 for the first time in the history of the college, played at Eden Gardens and became runners in College Cricket Tournament ganised b by Cricket Association of Bengal under the leadership of College Game secretary of that time Mr. Abhijit Guha Ray.

=== Cultural activities ===
Keeping in mind the overall development of the student community, the college tries to engage its students in cultural activities and functions at regular intervals. Apart from the usual 'Freshers' Welcome' and the Annual Fest, other functions befitting particular occasions and situations are arranged from time to time to encourage the students to showcase their talents as well as give scope to some healthy, competitive entertainment.

=== Extension activities ===
Every year the college organizes a blood-donation camp where a huge number of students voluntarily donate blood for a noble cause. The daylong program also includes free E.C.G. tests. The college also has a tie-up with the Students’ Health Home, which offers medical facilities to the students. The college has lined up some Awareness Programmes the details of which will be duly flashed on the Web Page( Announcements). The college also arranges educational tours and excursions from time to time under the protective supervision of experienced staff members. A specially constituted committee oversees such affairs. CA Toppers are also from this college.

=== St. Peter's Ambulance ===
There is an ambulance section called St. Peter's Ambulance brigade, which, apart from offering some courses to students, extends great service to the students and the staff alike Such service ranges from giving First Aid to conducting ECG and similar other tests.

== Admission process, norms and principles ==
Being affiliated to Calcutta University, the college follows the norms set by the university about the admission criteria and the methods to be adopted. At the time of admission, which takes place in June, the college stresses the importance of admission on merit. Students are admitted strictly on basis of their worth and eligibility, keeping in view at the same time the intake capacity of the institution. In the initial stages of the procedure, the most eligible candidates are given direct admission, after which the process is regulated as per the panel/s of the candidates next in line for admission. In this academic year, however, some unavoidable circumstances have forced the admission process to start late.

=== Examination schedule ===
Since the college is affiliated to Calcutta University, it takes care to abide by the examination schedule chalked out by the university. Accordingly, any changes made by the university in the examination schedule, are bound to find corresponding changes in the examination schedule of the college. As per the recent directives of the university, the college has chalked out its examination schedule the outline of which is as follows:

a) Mid-term Test ( For all Classes and Years): in November b) College Test: i) For 1st Year Classes: in March ii) For 2nd Year Classes: in February iii) For 3rd Year Classes : in January

According to the same directives, the Information Technology Examination for the 2nd Year students will take place in April.

=== Percentage of Attendance ===
The college abides by the set of norms specified by Calcutta University for colleges under its jurisdiction, according to which, students, who attend 75% of classes per year, are declared eligible to sit for university examinations. In order to enable the students to attend classes on a regular basis and improve upon their percentage of attendance, the college conducts periodic checks of the same at regular intervals. This procedure is adopted to put the students wise about the classes they are required to attend.

=== Parents' interaction with teachers ===
In order to keep the teacher-student rapport perfect, address the difficulties, grievances and suggestions of the students and redress them in the best ways possible, as well as to keep parents abreast of the progress made by their wards, the college arranges interactive sessions from time to time. The institution has made provisions for a Students' Grievance Redressal Cell under the supervision of teachers, which will work as an important forum to level any differences either party has. A suggestion box in which students might drop their constructive suggestions with a selected group of teachers surveying and scanning them will come directly under the purview of such a Cell.

== See also ==
- List of colleges affiliated to the University of Calcutta
- Education in India
- Education in West Bengal
