= Radhanagar, Bankura =

Radhanagar
- Village
- Location in West Bengal, India Radhanagar (India)
- Coordinates: 23°09′22.1″N 87°19′25.2″E
- Country: India
- State: West Bengal
- District: Bankura

Population (2011)
  - Total: 5,335

Languages
  - Official: Bengali, English
- Time zone: UTC+5:30 (IST)
- Telephone/STD code: 03244
- Lok Sabha constituency: Bishnupur
- Vidhan Sabha constituency: Bishnupur
- Website: bankura.gov.in

Radhanagar is a village in the Bishnupur CD block in the Bishnupur subdivision of the Bankura district in the state of West Bengal, India

== Geography ==
Places in Bishnupur subdivision in Bankura district
M: Municipal town, CT: census town, R: rural/ urban centre, T: ancient/ temple centre
Owing to space constraints in the small map, the actual locations in a larger map may vary slightly

=== Location ===
Radhanagar is located at 23°09′22.1″N 87°19′25.2″E.

=== Area overview ===
The map alongside shows the Bishnupur subdivision of Bankura district. Physiographically, this area has fertile low lying alluvial plains. It is a predominantly rural area with 90.06% of the population living in rural areas and only 8.94% living in the urban areas. It was a part of the core area of Mallabhum.

Note: The map alongside presents some of the notable locations in the subdivision. All places marked in the map are linked in the larger full screen map.

== Demographics ==
According to the 2011 Census of India, Radhanagar had a total population of 5,335 of which 2,662 (50%) were males and 2,673 (50%) were females. Population below 6 years was 500. The total number of literates in Radhanagar was 3,428 (70.90% of the population over 6 years).

== Transport ==
The Bishnupur-Sonamukhi Road passes through Radhanagar.

== Education ==
Radhanagar High School is a Bengali-medium coeducational institution established in 1938. It has facilities for teaching from class V to class XII. The school has 20 computers, a library with 3,000 books and a playground.

Swami Dhananjoy Das Kathiababa Mahavidyalaya was established at Bhara in 2009.

== Healthcare ==
Radhanagar Rural Hospital, with 30 beds at Radhanagar, is the major government medical facility in the Bishnupur CD block. There are primary health centres at Ajodhya (with 6 beds), Kankila (with 6 beds) and Bhora (with 10 beds).
