= Gumut, Bankura =

Gumut
- Village
- Location in West Bengal, India Gumut (India)
- Coordinates: 23.126883°N 87.383452°E
- Country: India
- State: West Bengal
- District: Bankura

Population (2011)
  - Total: 1,723

Languages
  - Official: Bengali, English
- Time zone: UTC+5:30 (IST)
- PIN: 722140
- Telephone/STD code: 03243
- Lok Sabha constituency: Bishnupur
- Vidhan Sabha constituency: Bishnupur
- Website: bankura.gov.in

Gumut is a village and gram panchayat in the Bishnupur CD block in the Bishnupur subdivision of the Bankura district in the state of West Bengal, India. It includes Muninagar.

== Geography ==
Places in Bishnupur subdivision in Bankura district
M: Municipal town, CT: census town, R: rural/ urban centre, T: ancient/ temple centre
Owing to space constraints in the small map, the actual locations in a larger map may vary slightly

=== Location ===
Gumut is located at 23.126883°N 87.383452°E.

Note: The map alongside presents some of the notable locations in the subdivision. All places marked in the map are linked in the larger full screen map.

== Demographics ==
According to the 2011 Census of India, Gumut had a total population of 1,723, of which 872 (51%) were males and 851 (49%) were females. There were 162 persons in the age range of 0–6 years. The total number of literate persons in Gumut was 1,136 (72.77% of the population over 6 years).

== Education ==
Gumut Vidyasagar Sisu Shiksha Niketan was established in 2010 and Gumut Girls Primary School was established in 1939.

Muninagar Radhakanta Bidyapith is a Bengali-medium coeducational institution established in 1956. It has facilities for teaching from class V to class XII. The school has 10 computers, a library with 2,500 books and a playground.

== Culture ==
David J. McCutchion mentions the Muninagar Radha Kanta temple, located in Gumut, as a smooth twin deuls plain laterite temple built in 1678.

At places such as Kharar and the 17th century Radha Kanta temple at Muninagar and earlier at Baidyapur, the porch is almost as high as the main shrine, giving the impression of twin deuls.

The temple of Radha Kanta at Muninagar (at Sr No S-WB-10) is included in the List of State Protected Monuments in West Bengal by the Archaeological Survey of India.

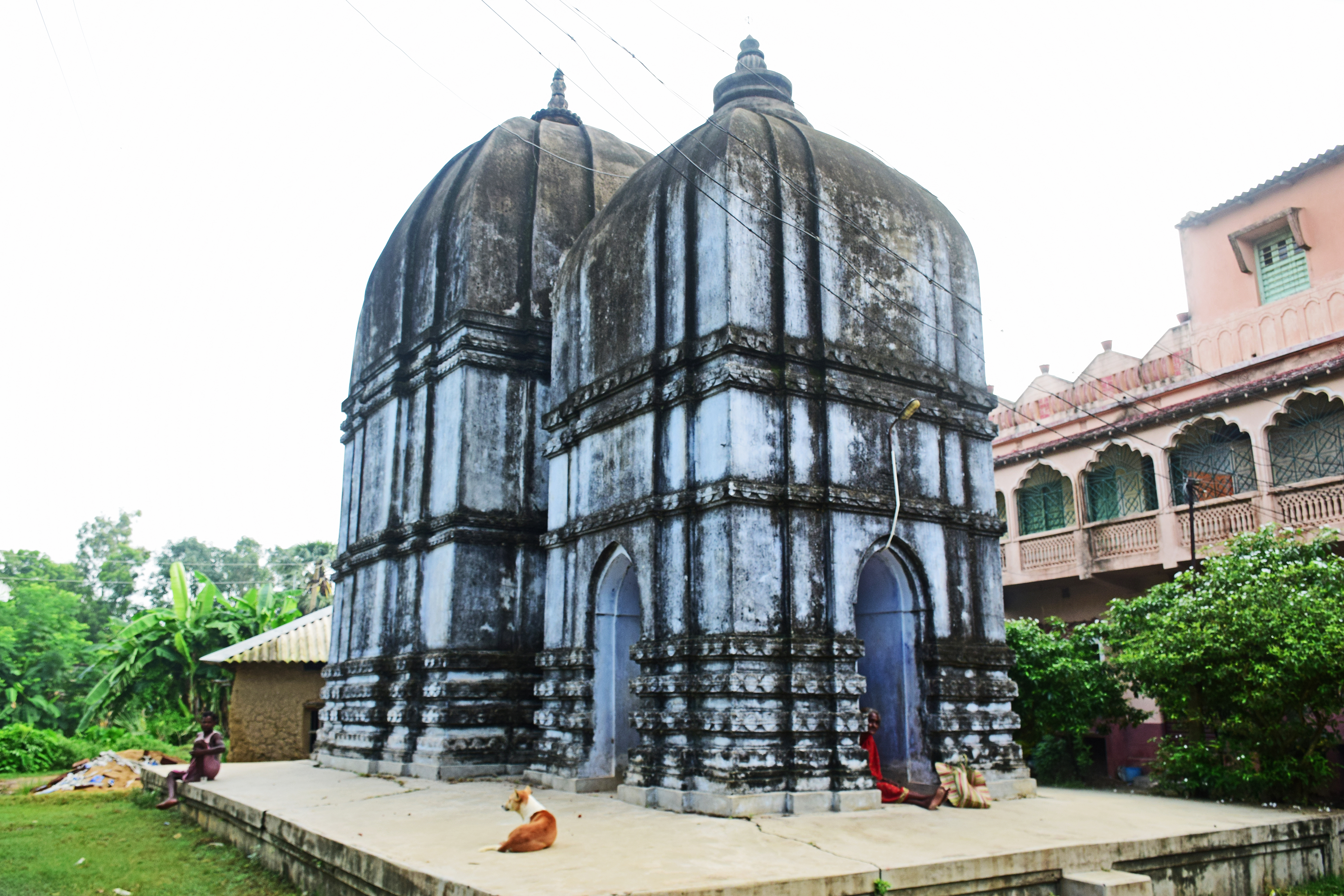
Radhakanta Deul Muninagar

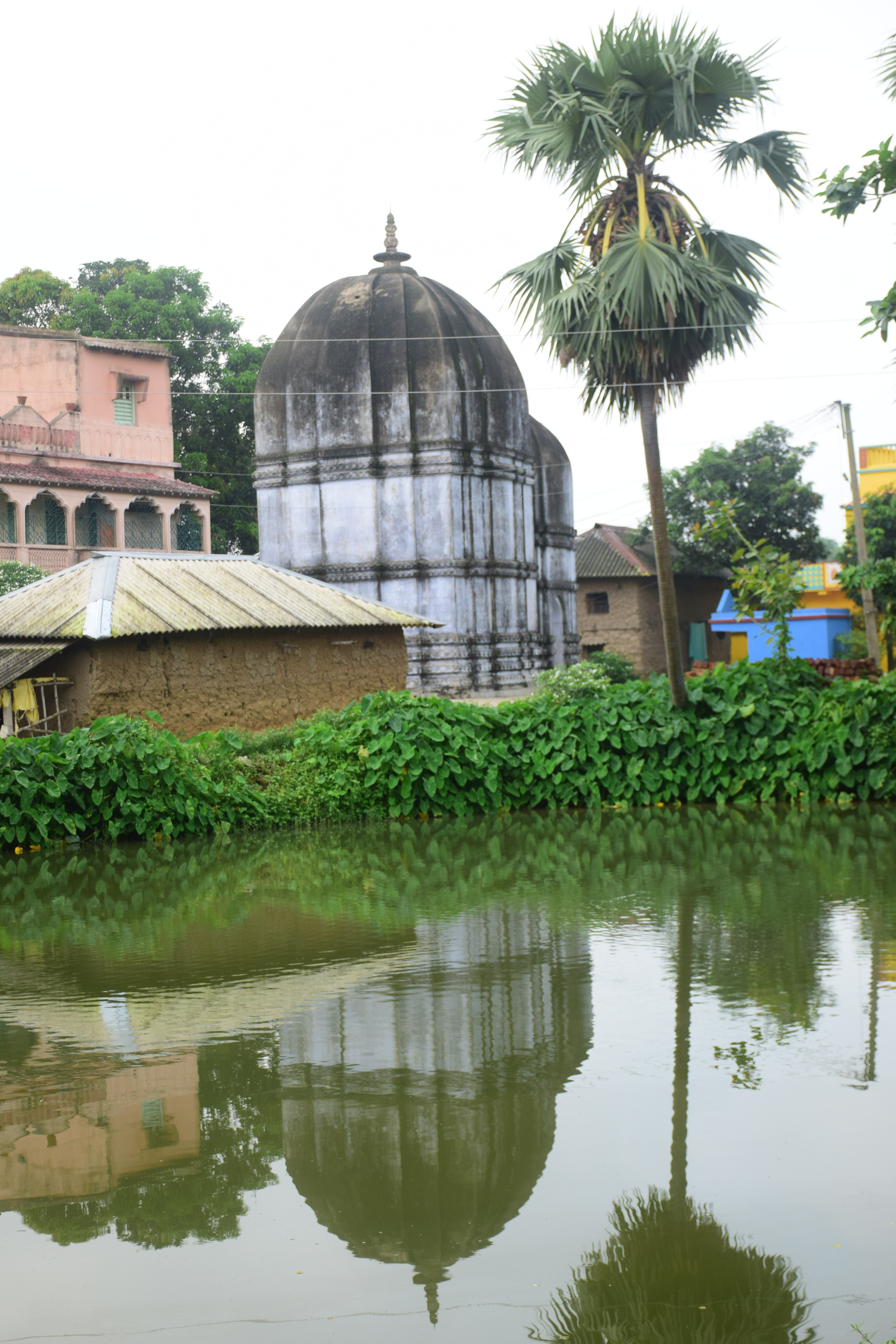
View from across the pond
