= Dwadashbari =

- Village
- Location in West Bengal, India Dwadashbari (India)
- Coordinates: 23.0654°N 87.2869°E
- Country: India
- State: West Bengal
- District: Bankura

Population (2011)
  - Total: 604

Languages
  - Official: Bengali, English
- Time zone: UTC+5:30 (IST)
- PIN: 722122
- Telephone/STD code: 03244
- Lok Sabha constituency: Bishnupur
- Vidhan Sabha constituency: Bishnupur
- Website: bankura.gov.in

Dwadashbari is a village in the Bishnupur CD block in the Bishnupur subdivision of the Bankura district in the state of West Bengal, India.

== Geography ==
Places in Bishnupur subdivision in Bankura district
M: Municipal town, CT: census town, R: rural/ urban centre, T: ancient/ temple centre
Owing to space constraints in the small map, the actual locations in a larger map may vary slightly

=== Location ===
Dwadashbari is located at 23.0654°N 87.2869°E.

Note: The map alongside presents some of the notable locations in the subdivision. All places marked in the map are linked in the larger full screen map.

== Demographics ==
According to the 2011 Census of India, Dwadashbari had a total population of 604, of which 325 (54%) were males and 279 (46%) were females. There were 69 persons in the age range of 0–6 years. The total number of literate persons in Dwadasbari was 360 (67.29% of the population over 6 years).

== Transport ==
Bishnupur railway station on the Kharagpur-Bankura-Adra line is located nearby.

== Culture ==
David J. McCutchion says that the most impressive ek-ratna (single tower) temples were built by the Malla kings. He lists several temples with structural variations: Kala-Chand, Lalji, Jora Mandir, Radha-Govinda, Radha-Madhava, Madan-Mohana, Radha-Syama (all at Bishnupur) and several outside Bishnupur. He points out the experimental variations of the Jadava Raya temple at Jadabnagar, with a "disproportionately massive upper structure" and the Nandakisor temple at Dwadashbari with a "tower on eight slender pillars." He mentions the Dwadashbari temple as a plain, laterite, abandoned structure.

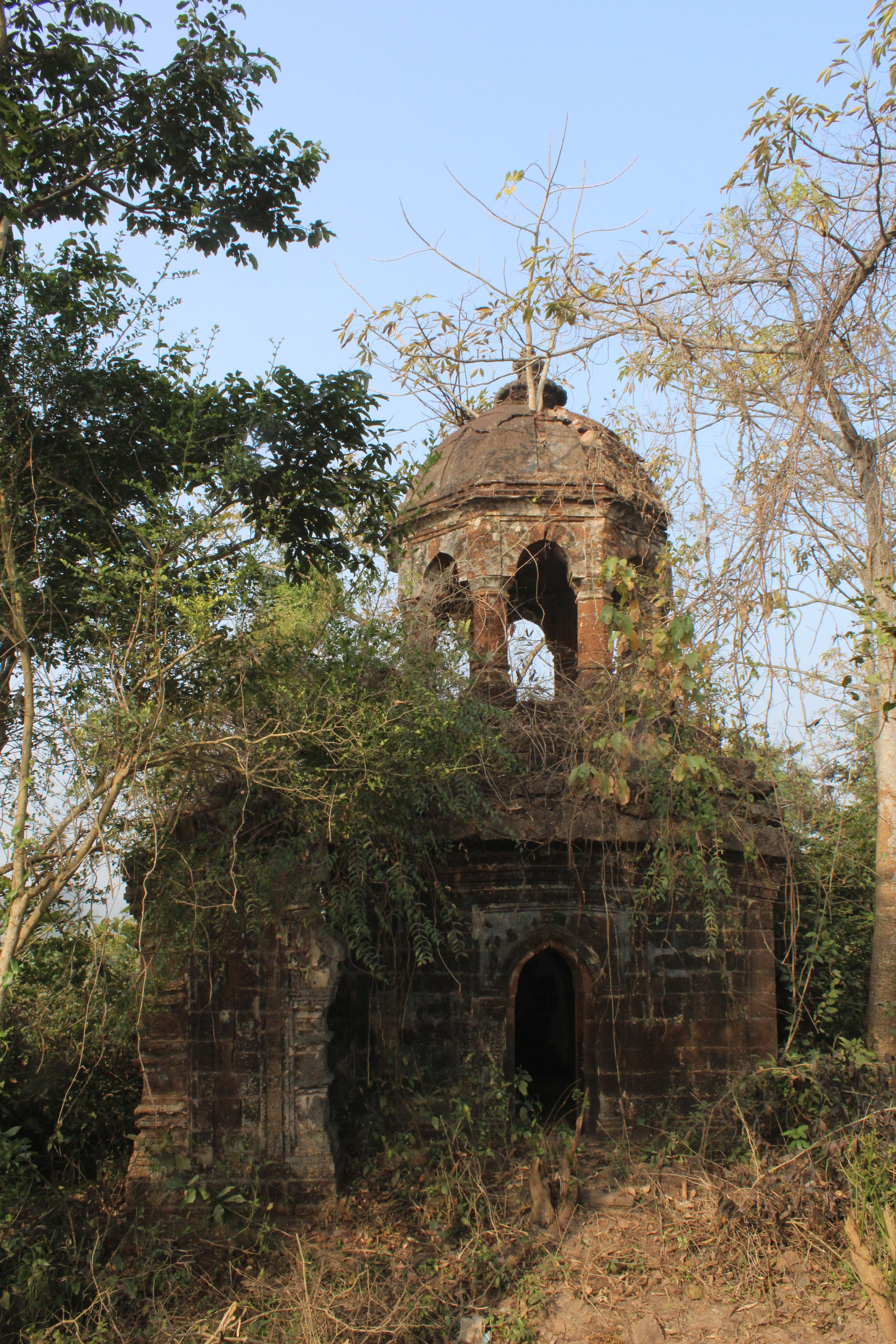

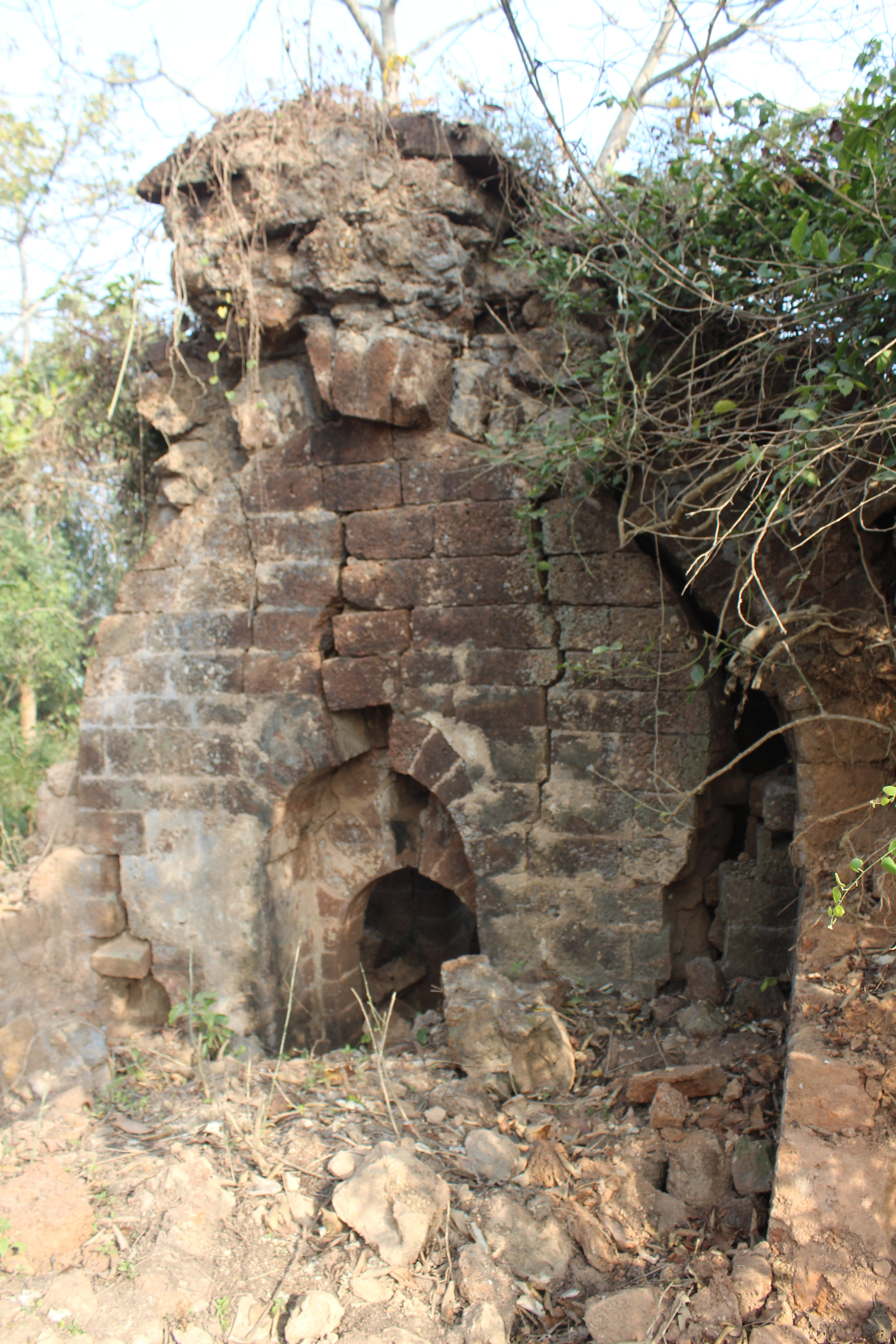

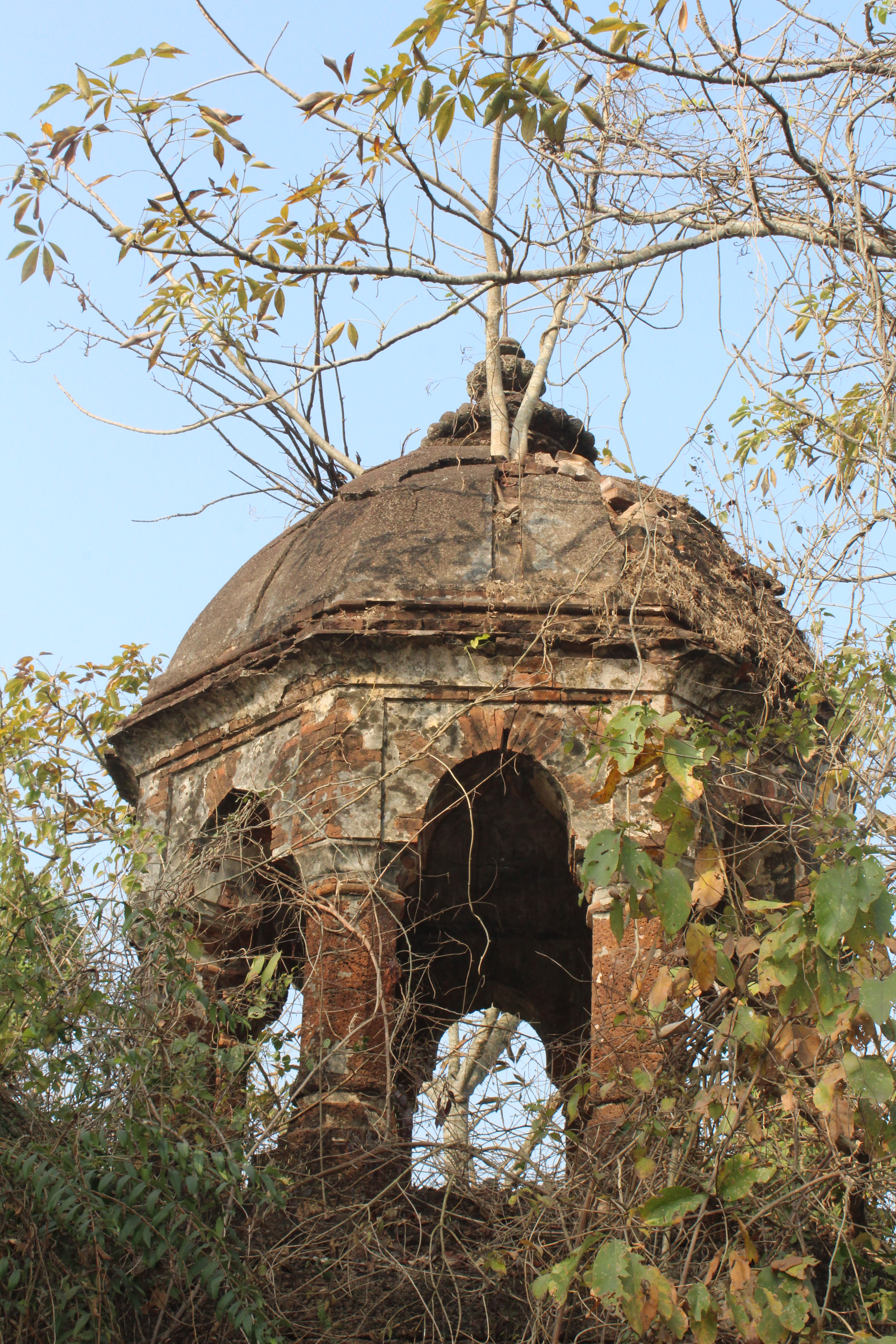

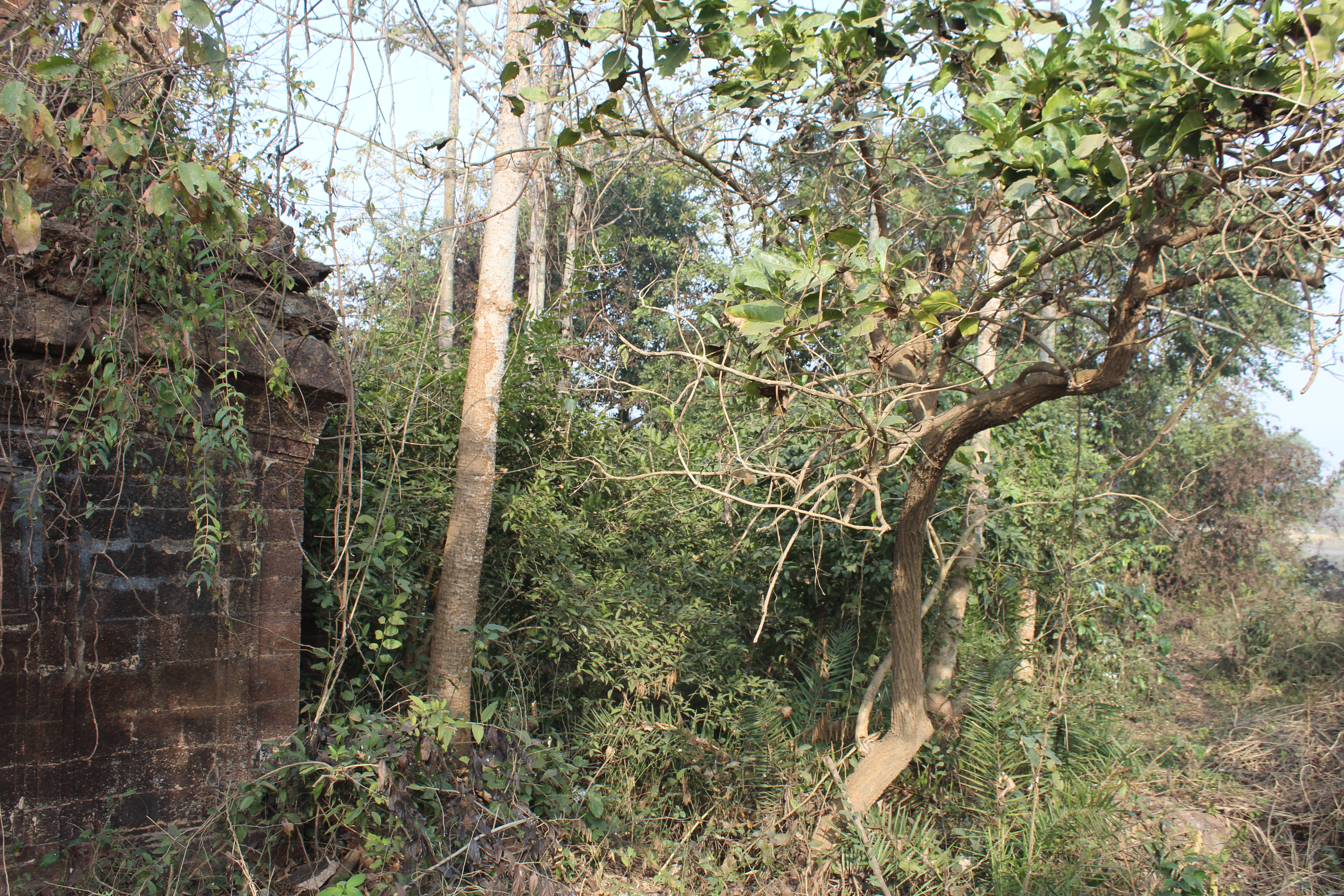
