= Tushar Kanti Bhattacharya =

Indian politician

Member of West Bengal Legislative Assembly
- In office 2016–2021
- Preceded by: Shyam Mukherjee
- Succeeded by: Tanmay Ghosh
- Constituency: Bishnupur (Bankura)

Personal details
- Born: Tushar Kanti Bhattacharya
- Party: All India Trinamool Congress
- Education: Intermediate, Calcutta University
- Occupation: Business

Tushar Kanti Bhattacharya is an Indian politician. He was elected to the West Bengal Legislative Assembly from Bishnupur (Bankura) in the 2016 West Bengal Legislative Assembly election as a member of the Indian National Congress.
