= Bishnupur, Bankura (community development block) =

Bishnupur
- Community development block
- Coordinates: 23.083333°N 87.316667°E
- Country: India
- State: West Bengal
- District: Bankura

Government
  - Type: Representative democracy

Area
  - Total: 392.00 km^{2} (151.35 sq mi)
- Elevation: 74 m (243 ft)

Population (2011)
  - Total: 156,822
  - Density: 400.06/km^{2} (1,036.1/sq mi)

Languages
  - Official: Bengali, English
- Time zone: UTC+5:30 (IST)
- PIN: 722163 (Ajodhya); 722164 (Bankadaha); 722122 (Bishnupur)
- Telephone/STD code: 03244
- ISO 3166 code: IN-WB
- Vehicle registration: WB-87, WB-88
- Literacy: 66.30%
- Lok Sabha constituency: Bishnupur
- Vidhan Sabha constituency: Bishnupur, Bankura
- Website: bankura.gov.in

Bishnupur (also spelled Vishnupur) is a community development block (CD block) that forms an administrative division in the Bishnupur subdivision of the Bankura district in the Indian state of West Bengal.

== History ==
=== From Bishnupur kingdom to the British Raj ===
From around 7th century AD till around the advent of British rule, for around a millennium, history of Bankura district is identical with the rise and fall of the Hindu Rajas of Bishnupur. The Bishnupur Rajas, who were at the summit of their fortunes towards the end of the 17th century, started declining in the first half of the 18th century. First, the Maharaja of Burdwan seized the Fatehpur Mahal, and then the Maratha invasions laid waste their country.

Bishnupur was ceded to the British with the rest of Burdwan chakla in 1760. In 1787, Bishnupur was united with Birbhum to form a separate administrative unit. In 1793 it was transferred to the Burdwan collectorate. In 1879, the district acquired its present shape with the thanas of Khatra and Raipur and the outpost of Simplapal being transferred from Manbhum, and the thanas of Sonamukhi, Kotulpur and Indas being retransferred from Burdwan. However, it was known for sometime as West Burdwan and in 1881 came to be known as Bankura district.

== Geography ==
Map of Bankura District showing CD blocks and municipalities

Bishnupur is located at 23°05′00″N 87°19′00″E.

Bishnupur CD block is located in the north-eastern part of the district and belongs to the fertile low lying alluvial plains, similar to the predominating rice lands in the adjacent districts of West Bengal. Here, the eye constantly rests on wide expanses of rice fields, green in the rains but parched and dry in summer.

Bishnupur CD block is bounded by Sonamukhi CD block on the north, Indas, Patrasayer and Joypur CD blocks on the east, Garhbeta I CD block in Paschim Medinipur district, on the south and Taldangra and Onda CD blocks on the west.

Large forest areas exist in Sonamukhi, Joypur, Bishnupur, Khatra and Ranibandh areas.

Bishnupur CD block has an area of 365.73 km^{2}. It has 1 panchayat samity, 9 gram panchayats, 113 gram sansads (village councils), 161 mouzas and 147 inhabited villages. Bishnupur police station serves this block. The headquarters of this CD block is at Bishnupur.

Gram panchayats of Bishnupur block/ panchayat samiti are: Ajodhya, Bankadha, Belsulia, Bhora, Dwarika Gosainpur, Layekbandh, Marar, Radhanagar and Uliara.

== Demographics ==
=== Population ===
According to the 2011 Census of India, Bishnupur CD block had a total population of 156,822, all of which were rural. There were 79,941 (51%) males and 76,881 (49%) females. Population in the age range of 0 to 6 years was 19,102. Scheduled Castes numbered 55,940 (35.67%) and Scheduled Tribes numbered 11,812 (7.53%).

Large villages (with 4,000+ population) in Bishnupur CD block are (2011 census figures in brackets): Chua Masina (5,726), Radhanagar (5,335), Marar (7,799), Majura (4,245) and Chak Uparsol (5,416).

Other villages in Bishnupur CD block are (2011 census figures in brackets): Dwarika (2,366), Dihar (815), Layek Bandh (3,325), Ajodhya (2,862), Bhara (2,970), Uliara (2,067), Belshula (1,028), Gumut (1,723), Dwadashbari (604), Ajodhya (2,862) and Joykrishnapur (2,749).

=== Literacy ===
According to the 2011 census, the total number of literates in Bishnupur CD block was 91,309 (66.30% of the population over 6 years) out of which males numbered 53,099 (75.51% of the male population over 6 years) and females numbered 38,210 (56.69%) of the female population over 6 years). The gender disparity (the difference between female and male literacy rates) was 18.82%.

See also – List of West Bengal districts ranked by literacy rate

Literacy in CD blocks of
Bankura district
Bankura Sadar subdivision
Saltora – 61.45%
Mejia – 66.83%
Gangajalghati – 68.11%
Chhatna – 65.73%
Bankura I – 68.74%
Bankura II – 73.59%
Barjora – 71.67%
Onda – 65.82%
Bishnupur subdivision
Indas – 71.70%
Joypur – 74.57%
Patrasayer – 64.8%
Kotulpur – 78.01%
Sonamukhi – 66.16%
Bishnupur – 66.30%
Khatra subdivision
Indpur – 67.42%
Ranibandh – 68.53%
Khatra – 72.18%
Hirbandh – 64.18%
Raipur – 71.33%
Sarenga – 74.25%
Simlapal – 68.44%
Taldangra – 70.87%
2011 Census: CD Block Wise

Primary Census Abstract Data

=== Language and religion ===
Religion in Bishnupur CD block (2011)
Hinduism	79.20%
Islam	17.76%
Other (tribal religion)	2.73%
Other or not stated	0.31%

In the 2011 census Hindus numbered 124,197 and formed 79.20% of the population in Bishnupur CD block. Muslims numbered 27,849 and formed 17.76% of the population. Others numbered 4,776 and formed 3.04% of the population. Others include Addi Bassi, Marang Boro, Santal, Saranath, Sari Dharma, Sarna, Alchchi, Bidin, Sant, Saevdharm, Seran, Saran, Sarin, Kheria, and other religious communities. In 2001, Hindus were 79.82%, Muslims 16.39% and followers of tribal religions 3.74% of the population respectively.

Languages of Bishnupur CD block (2011)
1. Bengali (92.6%)
2. Santali (7.03%)
3. Others (0.37%)

At the time of the 2011 census, 92.60% of the population spoke Bengali and 7.03% Santali as their first language.

== Rural poverty ==
In Bishnupur CD block 45.21% families were living below poverty line in 2007. According to the Rural Household Survey in 2005, 28.87% of the total number of families were BPL families in the Bankura district.

== Economy ==
=== Livelihood ===
Livelihood
in Bishnupur CD block
1. Cultivators (21.2%)
2. Agricultural labourers (44.6%)
3. Household industries (5.77%)
4. Other Workers (28.4%)

In the Bishnuur CD block in 2011, among the class of total workers, cultivators numbered 14,261 and formed 21.24%, agricultural labourers numbered 29,960 and formed 44.61%, household industry workers numbered 3,876 and formed 5.77% and other workers numbered 19,059 and formed 28.38%. Total workers numbered 67,156 and formed 42.82% of the total population, and non-workers numbered 89,666 and formed 57.18% of the population.

Note: In the census records a person is considered a cultivator, if the person is engaged in cultivation/ supervision of land owned by self/government/institution. When a person who works on another person's land for wages in cash or kind or share, is regarded as an agricultural labourer. Household industry is defined as an industry conducted by one or more members of the family within the household or village, and one that does not qualify for registration as a factory under the Factories Act. Other workers are persons engaged in some economic activity other than cultivators, agricultural labourers and household workers. It includes factory, mining, plantation, transport and office workers, those engaged in business and commerce, teachers, entertainment artistes and so on.

=== Infrastructure ===
There are 147 inhabited villages in the Bishnupur CD block, as per the District Census Handbook, Bankura, 2011. 100% villages have power supply. 146 villages (99.32%) have drinking water supply. 22 villages (14.97%) have post offices. 124 villages (84.35%) have telephones (including landlines, public call offices and mobile phones). 40 villages (27.21%) have pucca (paved) approach roads and 68 villages (46.26%) have transport communication (includes bus service, rail facility and navigable waterways). 16 villages (10.88%) have agricultural credit societies and 8 villages (5.44%) have banks.

=== Agriculture ===
There were 117 fertiliser depots, 22 seed stores and 46 fair price shops in the Bishnupur CD block.

In 2013-14, persons engaged in agriculture in Bishnupur CD block could be classified as follows: bargadars 15.71%, patta (document) holders 21.77%, small farmers (possessing land between 1 and 2 hectares) 4.90%, marginal farmers (possessing land up to 1 hectare) 16.61% and agricultural labourers 41.02%.

In 2003-04 net area sown Bishnupur CD block was 16,123 hectares and the area in which more than one crop was grown was 11,904 hectares.

In 2013-14, the total area irrigated in Bishnupur CD block was 20,384 hectares, out of which 6,760 hectares was by canal water, 350 hectares by tank water, 820 hectares by river lift irrigation, 1,050 hectares by deep tube well, 11,094 hectares by shallow tubewell, 20 hectares by open dug wells and 290 hectares by other methods.

In 2013-14, Bishnupur CD block produced 103,234 tonnes of Aman paddy, the main winter crop, from 37,032 hectares, 358 tonnes of Aus paddy from 236 hectares, 1,707 tonnes of Boro paddy from 561 hectares, 30 tonnes of wheat from 14 hectares and 26,873,000 tonnes of potatoes from 2,005 hectares. It also produced pulses and mustard.

Another crop of Bishnupur is Silk.

=== Handloom and pottery industries ===
The handloom industry engages the largest number of persons in the non farm sector and hence is important in Bankura district. The handloom industry is well established in all the CD blocks of the district and includes the famous Baluchari saris. In 2004-05 Bishnupur CD block had 154 silk looms in operation. In Bishnupur municipal area (outside the CD block) there were 1,220 looms in operation.

Bankura district is famous for the artistic excellence of its pottery products that include the famous Bankura horse. The range of pottery products is categorised as follows: domestic utilities, terracota and other decorative items and roofing tiles and other heavy pottery items. Around 3,200 families were involved in pottery making in the district in 2002. 135 families were involved in Bishnupur CD block.

=== Banking ===
In 2013-14, Bishnupur CD block had offices of 6 commercial banks and 3 gramin banks.

=== Backward Regions Grant Fund ===
The Bankura district is listed as a backward region and receives financial support from the Backward Regions Grant Fund. The fund, created by the Government of India, is designed to redress regional imbalances in development. As of 2012, 272 districts across the country were listed under this scheme. The list includes 11 districts of West Bengal.

== Transport ==
In 2013-14, Bishnupur CD block had 2 ferry services and 11 originating/ terminating bus routes.

The Kharagpur-Bankura-Adra line of South Eastern Railway passes through this CD block. There is a station at Bishnupur .

The Bishnupur-Maynapur line of South Eastern Railway passes through this CD block, which will soon connect to the Goghat-Arambagh line of Eastern Railway, after construction of the railway track from Maynapur to Goghat.

NH 14, (old numbering NH 60), running from Morgram to Kharagpur, passes through this CD block.

State Highway 2 (West Bengal) running from Bankura to Malancha (in North 24 Parganas district) passes through this CD block.

== Education ==
In 2013-14, Bishnupur CD block had 150 primary schools, 18 middle schools, 8 high schools and 10 higher secondary schools. It also has 1 general college and 3 professional/ technical institutions. Bishnupur (municipal town) had a general college outside the CD block.

See also – Education in India

According to the 2011 census, in the Bishnupur CD block, among the 147 inhabited villages, 21 villages did not have a school, 40 villages had two or more primary schools, 41 villages had at least 1 primary and 1 middle school and 14 villages had at least 1 middle and 1 secondary school.

Swami Dhananjoy Das Kathiababa Mahavidyalaya was established at Bhara in 2009.

== Healthcare ==
In 2014, Bishnupur CD block had 1 rural hospital and 3 primary health centre.

Radhanagar Rural Hospital, with 30 beds at Radhanagar, is the major government medical facility in the Bishnupur CD block. There are primary health centres at Ajodhya (with 6 beds), Kankila (with 6 beds) and Bhora (with 10 beds).
