= Nirmal Kumar Dhara =

Indian politician

Member of the West Bengal Legislative Assembly
- Incumbent
- Assumed office 5 May 2021
- Preceded by: Gurupada Mete
- Constituency: Indas

Personal details
- Party: Bharatiya Janata Party
- Education: Burdwan University (M.A. in English)
- Profession: Private Tutor

Nirmal Kumar Dhara (born 1982) is an Indian politician from West Bengal. He is a two time member of the West Bengal Legislative Assembly representing the Bharatiya Janata Party from the Indas Assembly constituency, which is reserved for Scheduled Caste community, in Bankura district. He won Indas seat in May 2021, and retained in May 2026.

== Career ==
Dhara became an MLA for the first time winning the Indas Assembly constituency in the 2021 West Bengal Legislative Assembly election. He defeated Runu Mete of the All India Trinamool Congress by a margin of 7,220 votes. He retained the seat in the 2026 West Bengal Legislative Assembly election.

=== Poorest MLA in 2021 ===
Dhara gained national attention as the poorest MLA in India in May 2021. According to his election affidavit and reports by the Association for Democratic Reforms (ADR) before the 2021 Assembly election, he declared assets worth Rs.1,700 in his affidavit to the Election Commission of India. However, his assets increased to Rs.10.5 lakhs as per the affidavit filed to ECI before the April 2026 Assembly election.
