= Indas (community development block) =

- Community development block
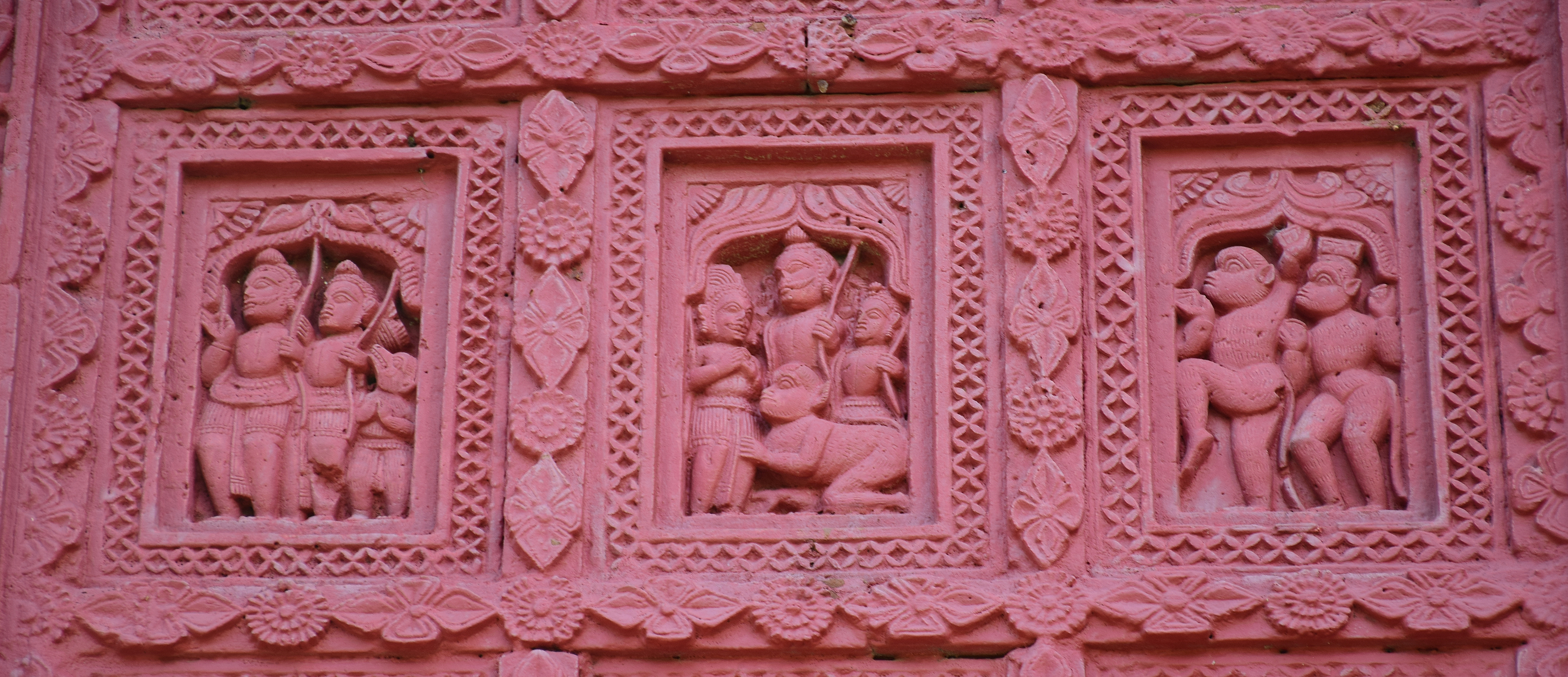
- Terracotta plaque in the Radha Kanta temple at Akui

- Coordinates: 23.15°N 87.616667°E
- Country: India
- State: West Bengal
- District: Bankura

Government
  - Type: Representative democracy

Area
  - Total: 255.10 km^{2} (98.49 sq mi)
- Elevation: 49 m (161 ft)

Population (2011)
  - Total: 169,783
  - Density: 665.55/km^{2} (1,723.8/sq mi)

Languages
  - Official: Bengali, English
- Time zone: UTC+5:30 (IST)
- PIN: 722205 (Indas)
- Telephone/STD code: 03244
- ISO 3166 code: IN-WB
- Vehicle registration: WB-67, WB-68
- Literacy: 71.76%
- Lok Sabha constituency: Bishnupur
- Vidhan Sabha constituency: Indas
- Website: bankura.gov.in

Indas (also spelled Indus) is a community development block (CD block) that forms an administrative division in the Bishnupur subdivision of the Bankura district in the Indian state of West Bengal.

== History ==
=== From Bishnupur kingdom to the British Raj ===
From around the 7th century AD till around the advent of British rule, for around a millennium, history of Bankura district is identical with the rise and fall of the Hindu Rajas of Bishnupur. The Bishnupur Rajas, who were at the summit of their fortunes towards the end of the 17th century, started declining in the first half of the 18th century. First, the Maharaja of Burdwan seized the Fatehpur Mahal, and then the Maratha invasions laid waste their country.

Bishnupur was ceded to the British with the rest of Burdwan chakla in 1760. In 1787, Bishnupur was united with Birbhum to form a separate administrative unit. In 1793 it was transferred to the Burdwan collectorate. In 1879, the district acquired its present shape with the thanas of Khatra and Raipur and the outpost of Simplapal being transferred from Manbhum, and the thanas of Sonamukhi, Kotulpur and Indas being retransferred from Burdwan. However, it was known for sometime as West Burdwan and in 1881 came to be known as Bankura district.

== Geography ==
Map of Bankura District showing CD blocks and municipalities

Indas is located at 23°09′00″N 87°37′00″E.

Indas CD block is located in the eastern part of the district and belongs to the fertile low lying alluvial plains, similar to the predominating rice lands in the adjacent districts of West Bengal. Here, the eye constantly rests on wide expanses of rice fields, green in the rains but parched and dry in summer.

Indas CD block is bounded by Khandaghosh CD block, in Purba Bardhaman district, on the north and the east, Kotulpur and Joypur CD blocks on the south and Patrasayer CD block on the west.

Indas CD block has an area of 254.99 km^{2}. It has 1 panchayat samity, 10 gram panchayats, 129 gram sansads (village councils), 131 mouzas and 129 inhabited villages. Indas police station serves this block. Headquarters of this CD block is at Indas.

Gram panchayats of Indas block/ panchayat samiti are: Akui I, Akui II, Amrul, Dighalgram, Indus I, Indus II, Karisunda, Mangalpur, Rol and Sahaspur.

== Demographics ==
=== Population ===
According to the 2011 Census of India, Indas CD block had a total population of 169,783, all of which were rural. There were 86,697 (51%) males and 83,086 (49%) females. Population in the age range of 0 to 6 years was 18,624. Scheduled Castes numbered 74,281 (43.75%) and Scheduled Tribes numbered 3,143 (1.85%).

According to the 2001 census, Indas block had a total population of 152,829, out of which 78,324 were males and 74,505 were females. Indas block registered a population growth of 15.48 per cent during the 1991-2001 decade. Decadal growth for the district was 15.15 per cent. Decadal growth in West Bengal was 17.84 per cent.

Large villages (with 4,000+ population) in Indas CD block are (2011 census figures in brackets): Somsar (4,431), Akui (6,115) and Kharsi (4,206).

Other villages in Indas CD block are (2011 census figures in brackets): Indas (2,479), Shaspur (3,902), Karisunda (3,608), Amrul (2,093), Rol (3,858), Mangalpur (2,665) and Dighalgram (3,033).

=== Literacy ===
As per the 2011 census the total number of literates in Indas CD block was 108,569 (71.76% of the population over 6 years) out of which males numbered 60,972 (78.96% of the male population over 6 years) and females numbered 47,497 (64.23%) of the female population over 6 years). The gender disparity (the difference between female and male literacy rates) was 14.73%.

As per the 2011 census, literacy in Bankura district was 70.26%, up from 63.44 in 2001 and 52.00% in 1991. Literacy in West Bengal was 77.08% in 2011. Literacy in India in 2011 was 74.04%.

See also – List of West Bengal districts ranked by literacy rate

Literacy in CD blocks of
Bankura district
Bankura Sadar subdivision
Saltora – 61.45%
Mejia – 66.83%
Gangajalghati – 68.11%
Chhatna – 65.73%
Bankura I – 68.74%
Bankura II – 73.59%
Barjora – 71.67%
Onda – 65.82%
Bishnupur subdivision
Indas – 71.70%
Joypur – 74.57%
Patrasayer – 64.8%
Kotulpur – 78.01%
Sonamukhi – 66.16%
Bishnupur – 66.30%
Khatra subdivision
Indpur – 67.42%
Ranibandh – 68.53%
Khatra – 72.18%
Hirbandh – 64.18%
Raipur – 71.33%
Sarenga – 74.25%
Simlapal – 68.44%
Taldangra – 70.87%
2011 Census: CD Block Wise

Primary Census Abstract Data

=== Language and religion ===
Religion in Indas CD block (2011)
Hinduism	81.98%
Islam	17.70%
Other or not stated	0.32%

In the 2011 census Hindus numbered 139,180 and formed 81.98% of the population in Indas CD block. Muslims numbered 30,060 and formed 17.70% of the population. Others numbered 543 and formed 0.32% of the population. Others include Addi Bassi, Marang Boro, Santal, Saranath, Sari Dharma, Sarna, Alchchi, Bidin, Sant, Saevdharm, Seran, Saran, Sarin, Kheria, and other religious communities. In 2001, Hindus were 82.45% and Muslims 17.33% of the population respectively.

Languages of Indas CD block (2011)
1. Bengali (98.4%)
2. Santali (1.53%)
3. Others (0.08%)

At the time of the 2011 census, 98.39% of the population spoke Bengali and 1.53% Santali as their first language.

== Rural poverty ==
In Indas CD block 30.8% families were living below poverty line in 2007. According to the Rural Household Survey in 2005, 28.87% of the total number of families were BPL families in the Bankura district.

== Economy ==
=== Livelihood ===
Livelihood
in Indas CD block
1. Cultivators (21.8%)
2. Agricultural labourers (54.1%)
3. Household industries (2.14%)
4. Other Workers (22.0%)

In the Indas CD block in 2011, among the class of total workers, cultivators numbered 14,982 and formed 21.76%, agricultural labourers numbered 37,346 and formed 54.09%, household industry workers numbered 1,475 and formed 2.14% and other workers numbered 15,159 and formed 22.01%. Total workers numbered 68,862 and formed 40.56% of the total population, and non-workers numbered 100,921 and formed 59.44% of the population.

Note: In the census records a person is considered a cultivator, if the person is engaged in cultivation/ supervision of land owned by self/government/institution. When a person who works on another person's land for wages in cash or kind or share, is regarded as an agricultural labourer. Household industry is defined as an industry conducted by one or more members of the family within the household or village, and one that does not qualify for registration as a factory under the Factories Act. Other workers are persons engaged in some economic activity other than cultivators, agricultural labourers and household workers. It includes factory, mining, plantation, transport and office workers, those engaged in business and commerce, teachers, entertainment artistes and so on.

=== Infrastructure ===
There are 129 inhabited villages in the Indas CD block, as per the District Census Handbook, Bankura, 2011. 100% villages have power supply. 100% villages have drinking water supply. 21 villages (16.28%) have post offices. 124 villages (96.12%) have telephones (including landlines, public call offices and mobile phones). 37 villages (28.68%) have pucca (paved) approach roads and 66 villages (51.16%) have transport communication (includes bus service, rail facility and navigable waterways). 18 villages (13.95%) have agricultural credit societies and 5 villages (3.88%) have banks.

=== Agriculture ===
There were 99 fertiliser depots, 12 seed stores and 48 fair price shops in the CD Block.

In 2013-14, persons engaged in agriculture in Indas CD block could be classified as follows: bargadars 11.10%, patta (document) holders 3.18%, small farmers (possessing land between 1 and 2 hectares) 6.34%, marginal farmers (possessing land up to 1 hectare) 21.83% and agricultural labourers 57.55%.

In 2003-04 net area sown Indas CD block was 20,482 hectares and the area in which more than one crop was grown was 7,400 hectares.

In 2013-14, the total area irrigated in Indas CD block was 20,803 hectares, out of which 13,001 hectares was by canal water, 200 hectares by tank water, 420 hectares by river lift irrigation, 538 hectares by deep tube well and 6,644 hectares by shallow tubewell.

In 2013-14, Indas CD block produced 3,726 tonnes of Aman paddy, the main winter crop, from 1,646 hectares, 4,380 tonnes of Aus paddy from 1,853 hectares, 12,370 tonnes of Boro paddy from 4,422 hectares, 452 tonnes of wheat from 235 hectares and 6,368,000 tonnes of potatoes from 940 hectares. It also produced pulses and mustard.

=== Handloom and pottery industries ===
The handloom industry engages the largest number of persons in the non farm sector and hence is important in Bankura district. The handloom industry is well established in all the CD blocks of the district and includes the famous Baluchari saris. In 2004-05 Indas CD block had 339 looms in operation.

Bankura district is famous for the artistic excellence of its pottery products that include the famous Bankura horse. The range of pottery products is categorised as follows: domestic utilities, terracota and other decorative items and roofing tiles and other heavy pottery items. Around 3,200 families were involved in pottery making in the district in 2002. 166 families were involved in Indas CD block.

=== Banking ===
In 2013-14, Indas CD block had offices of 4 commercial banks and 4 gramin banks. 1 District Central Co-operative Bank

=== Backward Regions Grant Fund ===
The Bankura district is listed as a backward region and receives financial support from the Backward Regions Grant Fund. The fund, created by the Government of India, is designed to redress regional imbalances in development. As of 2012, 272 districts across the country were listed under this scheme. The list includes 11 districts of West Bengal.

== Transport ==
In 2013-14, Indas CD block had 2 ferry services and 6 originating/ terminating bus routes.

DEMU services are available between Bankura and Masagram on the Bankura-Masagram line. There are stations at Bowaichandi, Sahaspur Road, Shankrul and Indas railway station.

The State Highway 8 (West Bengal) running from Santaldih (in Purulia district) to Majhdia (in Nadia district) passes through this CD block.

== Education ==
In 2013-14, Indas CD block had 145 primary schools with 14,380 students, 19 middle schools with 2,379 students, 11 high schools with 5,079 students and 11 higher secondary schools with 11,294 students. Indas CD block had 1 general college with 1,652 students and 275 institutions for special and non-formal education with 9,110 students.

See also – Education in India

According to the 2011 census, in the Indas CD block, among the 129 inhabited villages, 5 villages did not have a school, 38 villages had two or more primary schools, 41 villages had at least 1 primary and 1 middle school and 20 villages had at least 1 middle and 1 secondary school.

Indas Mahavidyalaya was established in 2006.

Akui Kamalabala Women's College was established at Akui in 2015.

== Culture ==
There are two heritage temples in the Indas CD block:

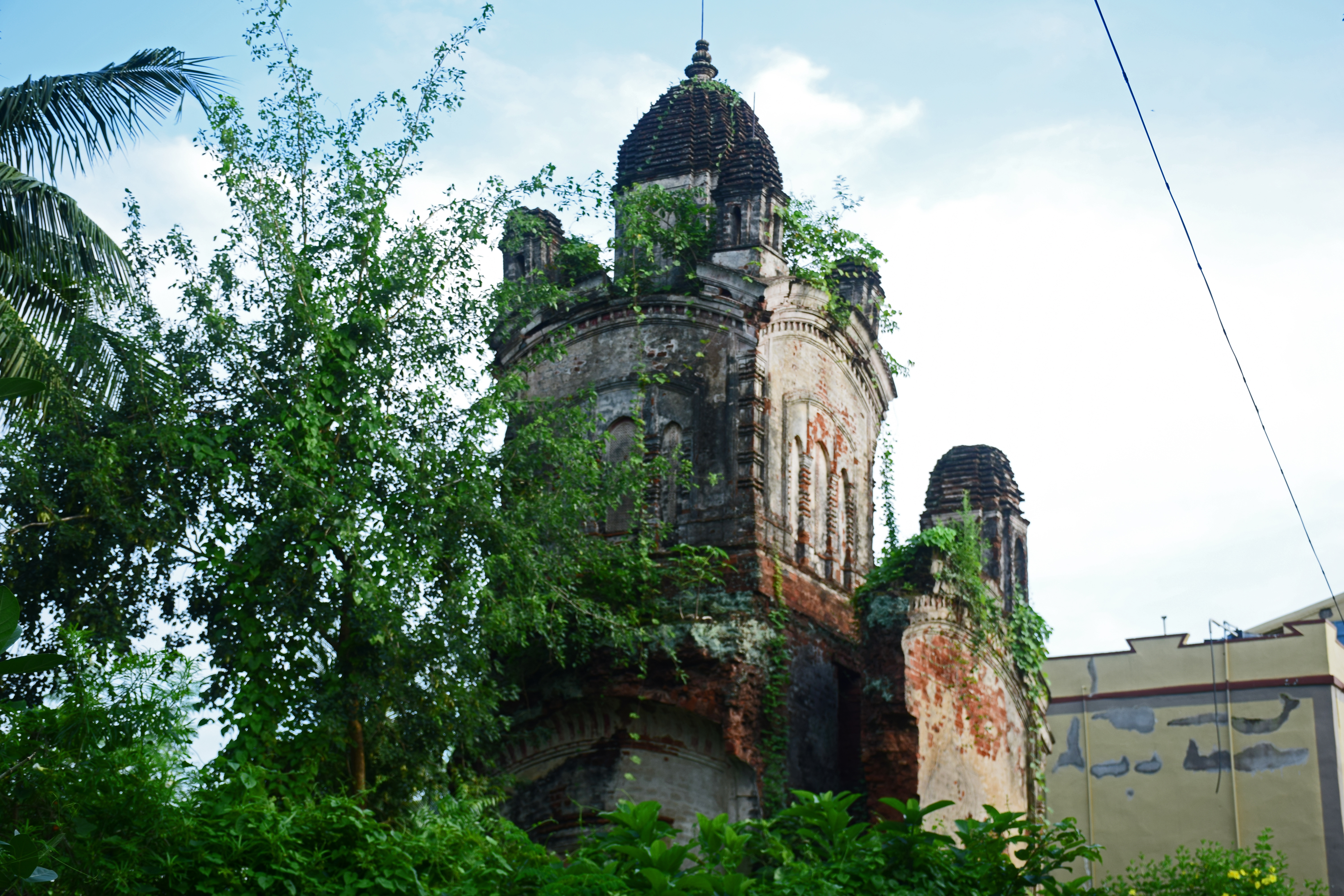
Krishnabatipara, Indas, Nava ratna Damodara temple, built in 1796 with terracotta façade, partially damaged

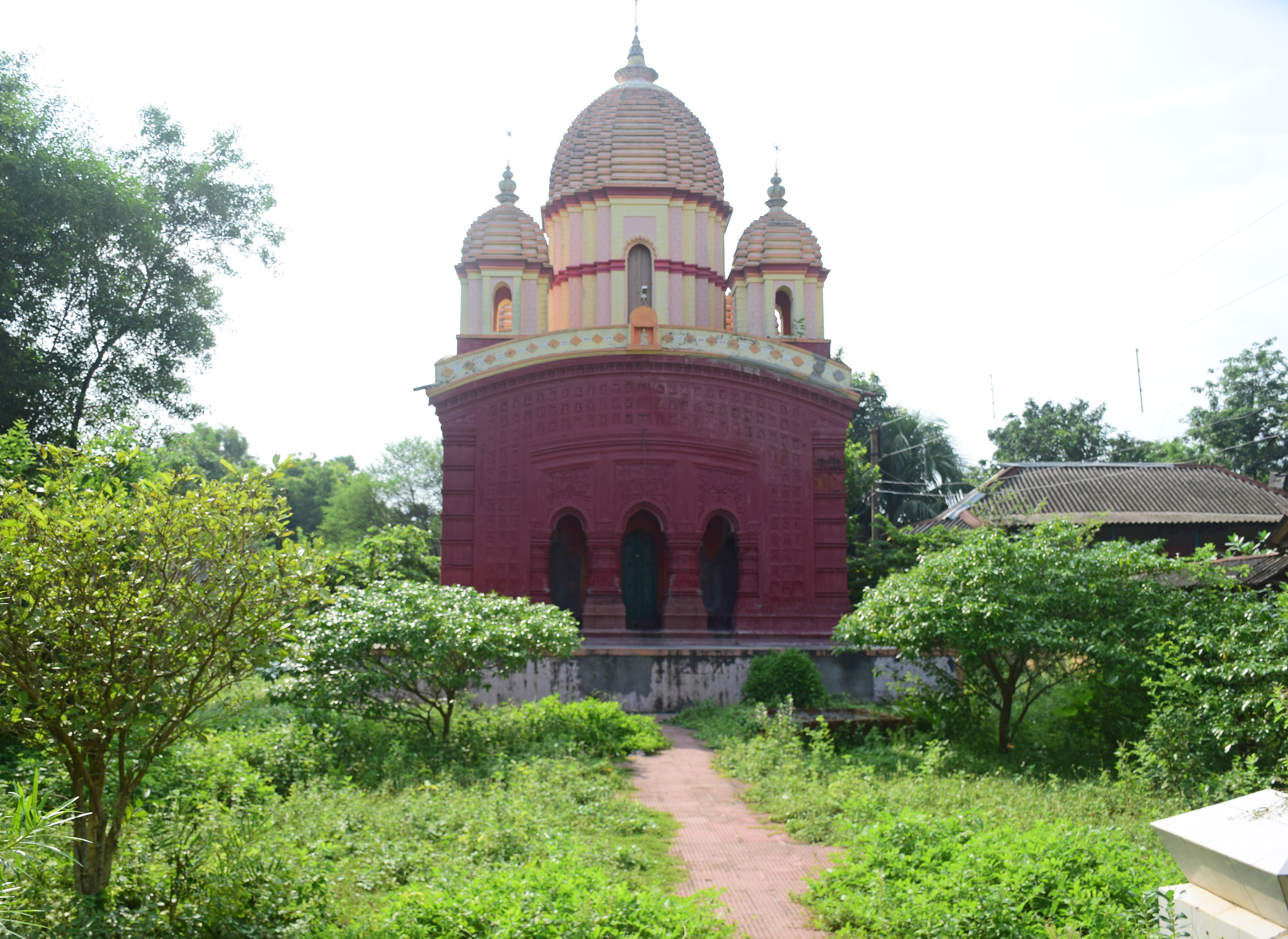
Akui: Pancha ratna Radha Kanta temple, built in 1764 with terracotta facade

== Healthcare ==
In 2014, Indas CD block had 1 rural hospital and 3 primary health centres with total 50 beds and 6 doctors. It had 25 family welfare sub centres and 1 family welfare centre. 7,839 patients were treated indoor and 172,729 patients were treated outdoor in the hospitals, health centres and subcentres of the CD block.

Indas Rural Hospital, with 30 beds at Indas, is the major government medical facility in the Indas CD block. There are primary health centres at Akui (with 4 beds), Keneti (Santasram Indus) (with 10 beds) and Dighalgram (with 6 beds).

== Notable people ==
- Khan Bahadur Dr. Syed Muhammed Siddique, MLA for Bankura
