= Bishnupur subdivision =

- Subdivision
- Interactive map of Bishnupur subdivision
- Coordinates: 23.08°N 87.32°E
- Country: India
- State: West Bengal
- District: Bankura
- Headquarters: Bishnupur

Area
  - Total: 1,870.05 km^{2} (722.03 sq mi)

Population (2011)
  - Total: 1,111,935
  - Density: 594.602/km^{2} (1,540.01/sq mi)

Languages
  - Official: Bengali, English
- Time zone: UTC+5:30 (IST)
- ISO 3166 code: IN-WB
- Vehicle registration: WB 88
- Website: http://bankura.gov.in/

Bishnupur subdivision is a subdivision of the Bankura district in the state of West Bengal, India.

== Subdivisions ==
Bankura district is divided into the following administrative subdivisions:

Subdivision	Headquarters	Area km^{2}	Population (2011)	Rural Population % (2001)	Urban Population % (2001)
Bankura Sadar	Bankura	2596.11	1,439,148	89.27	11.43
Khatra	Khatra	2407.49	1,045.591	100.00	0
Bishnupur	Bishnupur	1870.75	1,111,935	91.04	8.96
Bankura district	Bankura	6882.00	3,596,674	92.63	7.37

Bishnupur subdivision has a density of population of 595 per km^{2}. 29.07% of the population of the district resides in this subdivision.

Places in Bishnupur subdivision in Bankura district
M: Municipal town, CT: census town, R: rural/ urban centre, T: ancient/ temple centre
Owing to space constraints in the small map, the actual locations in a larger map may vary slightly

== Administrative units ==
Bishnupur subdivision has 6 police stations, 6 community development blocks, 6 panchayat samitis, 56 gram panchayats, 890 inhabited villages, 2 municipalities and 1 census town. The municipalities are Bishnupur and Sonamukhi. The census town is: Kotulpur. The subdivision has its headquarters at Bishnupur.

== Police stations ==
Police stations in Bishnupur subdivision have the following features and jurisdiction:

Police Station	Area covered km^{2}	Municipal Town	CD Block
Bishnupur	365.73	Bishnupur	Bishnupur
Jaypur	262.74	-	Joypur
Kotulpur	250.50	-	Kotulpur
Sonamukhi	380	Sonamukhi	Sonamukhi
Patrasayer	321.07	-	Patrasayer
Indas	255.10	-	Indas

== Blocks ==
Community development blocks in Bishnupur subdivision are:

CD Block	Headquarters	Area km^{2}	Population (2011)	SC %	ST %	Literacy rate %	Census Towns
Bishnupur	Bishnupur	365.73	156,822	35.67	7.53	66.30	
Indas	Indas	254.99	169,783	43.75	1.85	71.76	
Joypur	Jaypur	263.82	156,920	38.88	2.05	74.57	
Patrasayer	Patrasayer	322.62	184,070	46.45	3.01	64.87	
Kotulpur	Kotulpur	250.38	188,775	35.38	3.29	78.01	1
Sonamukhi	Sonamukhi	378.85	158,697	43.89	3.50	66.16	

== Gram Panchayats ==
The subdivision contains 56 gram panchayats under six community development blocks:

- Bishnupur block consists of: Ayodhya, Bhara, Morar, Bankadaha, Dwarika–Gossainpur, Radhanagar, Belsulia, Layekbandh and Uliyara.
- Indas block consists of: Akui–I, Dighalgram, Karisunda, Sahaspur, Akui–II, Indas–I, Mongalpur, Amrul, Indas–II and Rol.
- Joypur block consists of: Gelia, Kuchiakol, Salda, Hetia, Maynapur, Shyamnagar, Jagannathpur, Rautkhanda and Uttarbarh.
- Patrasayer block consists of: Balsi–I, Belut–Rasulpur, Jamkuri, Patrasayar, Balsi–II, Biur–Betur, Kushdwip, Beersingha, Hamirpur and Narayanpur.
- Kotulpur block consists of: Deshrahkoyalpara, Kotulpur, Lego, Mirzapur, Gopinathpur, Laugram, Madanmohanpur and Sihar.
- Sonamukhi block consists of: Coochdihi, Dihipara, Panchal, Radhamohanpur, Dhansimla, Hamirhati, Piarbera, Dhulai, Manikbazar and Purbanabasan.

== Education ==
Bankura district had a literacy rate of 70.26% as per the provisional figures of the census of India 2011. Bankura Sadar subdivision had a literacy rate of 69.56%, Khatra subdivision 69.79% and Bishnupur subdivision 71.60%.

Given in the table below (data in numbers) is a comprehensive picture of the education scenario in Bankura district for the year 2013-14. It may be noted that primary schools include junior basic schools; middle schools, high schools and higher secondary schools include madrasahs; technical schools include junior technical schools, junior government polytechnics, industrial technical institutes, industrial training centres, nursing training institutes etc.; technical and professional colleges include engineering colleges, medical colleges, para-medical institutes, management colleges, teachers training and nursing training colleges, law colleges, art colleges, music colleges etc. Special and non-formal education centres include sishu siksha kendras, madhyamik siksha kendras, centres of Rabindra mukta vidyalaya, recognised Sanskrit tols, institutions for the blind and other handicapped persons, Anganwadi centres, reformatory schools etc.

Subdivision	Primary School		Middle School		High School		Higher Secondary School		General College, Univ		Technical / Professional Instt		Non-formal Education	
Subdivision	Institution	Student	Institution	Student	Institution	Student	Institution	Student	Institution	Student	Institution	Student	Institution	Student
Bankura Sadar	1,371	117,820	144	17,951	90	69,329	91	78,909	9	14,782	14	2,865	2,228	69,919
Khatra	1,200	86,786	113	16,805	50	28,178	112	93,919	6	13,067	6	702	1,993	51,849
Bishnupur	979	86,750	112	15,092	57	28,738	81	78,915	6	10,552	14	4,170	1,649	57,769
Bankura district	3,550	291,356	369	49,848	197	126,245	284	251,743	21	38,401	34	7,737	5,870	179,537

=== Educational institutions ===
The following institutions are located in Bishnupur subdivision:

- Ramananda College at Bishnupur was established in 1945. It has four hostels – two for boys, one for girls and one special hostel for meritorious but poor boys.
- Mallabhum Institute of Technology was established in 2002. It is affiliated to Maulana Abul Kalam Azad University of Technology. It has hostel facilities.
- KG Engineering Institute at Bishnupur is a government polytechnic, started as an industrial school in 1922, became a full-fledged polytechnic in 1949 and taken over by the state government.
- Mallabhum Institute of Polytechnic, at Braja Radha Nagar, Bishnupur.
- Bishnupur Public Institute of Engineering at Siromonipur, Bishnupur, is a private polytechnic.
- Sonamukhi College at Sonamukhi was established in 1966.
- Chatra Ramai Pandit Mahavidyalaya, located at Chatra, PO Darapur, Kotulpur CD Block, was established in 2001.
- Patrasayer Mahavidyalaya at Patrasayer was established in 2005.
- Indas Mahavidyalaya at Indas was established in 2006.
- Akui Kamalabala Women's College was established at Akui in 2015.
- Swami Dhananjoy Das Kathiababa Mahavidyalaya was established at Bhara in 2009.
- Nikhil Banga Sikhsan Mahavidyalaya at Bishnupur was established in 1971 and offers courses leading to B.Ed. and B.P.Ed.
- Joypur B.Ed. College at Jaypur,
- Bishnupur Public Institute of Education at Siromonipur affiliated to Burdwan University..[25]

== Healthcare ==
The table below (all data in numbers) presents an overview of the medical facilities available and patients treated in the hospitals, health centres and sub-centres in 2014 in Bankura district.

Subdivision	Health & Family Welfare Deptt, WB				Other State Govt Deptts	Local bodies	Central Govt Deptts / PSUs	NGO / Private Nursing Homes	Total	Total Number of Beds	Total Number of Doctors	Indoor Patients	Outdoor Patients
Subdivision	Hospitals	Rural Hospitals	Block Primary Health Centres	Primary Health Centres	Other State Govt Deptts	Local bodies	Central Govt Deptts / PSUs	NGO / Private Nursing Homes	Total	Total Number of Beds	Total Number of Doctors	Indoor Patients	Outdoor Patients
Bankura Sadar	2	6	2	25	3	-	2	31	71	2,628	320	147,890	2,634,248
Khatra	1	7	1	21	-	-	-	4	34	698	77	58,258	1,440,172
Bishnupur	1	5	1	23	-	-	-	11	41	698	77	68,068	1,351,349
Bankura district	4	18	4	69	3	-	2	46	146	4,152	459	274,216	5,425,769

=== Medical facilities ===
Medical facilities in Bishnupur subdivision are as follows:

Hospitals: (Name, location, beds)

- Bishnupur Subdivisional Hospital, Bishnupur, 250 beds

Rural Hospitals: (Name, CD block, location, beds)

- Sonamukhi Rural Hospital, Sonamukhi CD block, Sonamukhi, 30 beds
- Kotulpur Rural Hospital, Kotulpur CD block, Kotulpur, 60 beds
- Patrasayer Rural Hospital, Patrasayer CD block, Hat Krishnanagar, Patrasayer, 30 beds
- Indas Rural Hospital, Indas CD block, Indas, 30 beds
- Radhanagar Rural Hospital, Bishnupur CD block, Radhanagar, 30 beds

Block Primary Health Centres: (Name, CD block, location, beds)

- Joypur Block Primary Health Centre, Joypur CD block, Joypur, 15 beds

Primary Health Centres : (CD block-wise)(CD block, PHC location, beds)

- Sonamukhi CD block: Dhulai (Gopikantapur) (6), Panchal (6), Kundu Pushkarini (10), Sitaljhore (6)
- Patrasayer CD block: Purba Naldanga (Roll) (6), Pandua (Kushdwip) (4), Balsi (10)
- Kotulpur CD block: Gopinathpur (6), Lego (10), Laugram Karakheria (10), Sihar (10), Mirjapur (4), Deshra (Deopara) (10)
- Indas CD block: Akui (4), Keneti (Santasram Indus) (10), Dighalgram (6)
- Joypur CD block: Hijaldiha (10), Uttarbar (Magura) (10), Hetia (panchayat management) (6), Jagannathpur (10)
- Bishnupur CD block: Ajodhya (6), Kankila (6), Bhora (10)

== Electoral constituencies ==
Lok Sabha (parliamentary) and Vidhan Sabha (state assembly) constituencies in Bankura district were as follows:

Lok Sabha constituency	Vidhan Sabha constituency	Reservation	CD Block and/or Gram panchayats
Bankura	Raghunathpur	SC	In Purulia district
	Saltora	SC	Saltora and Mejia CD Blocks; Banasuria, Barashal, Lachhmanpur and Latiaboni gram panchayats of Gangajalghati CD Block
	Chhatna	None	Chhatna CD Block; Veduasol, Brahmandiha, Hatgram, Indpur and Raghunathpur GPs of Indpur CD Block
	Ranibandh	ST	Ranibandh, Hirbandh and Khatra CD Blocks
	Raipur	ST	Raipur and Sarenga CD Blocks
	Taldangra	None	Bibarda, Fulmati, Harmasra, Khalgram, Panchmura and Taldangra GPs of Taldangra CD Block; Brojarajpur and Gaurbazar gram panchayats of Indpur CD Block; and Simlapal CD Block
	Bankura	None	Bankura municipality; Bankura I CD Block; and Junbedia, Mankanali and Purandarpur GPs of Bankura II CD Block
Bishnupur (SC)	Barjora	None	Barjora CD Block; and Bhaktabandh, Gangajalghati, Gobindadham, Kapista, Nityanandapur and Piraboni GPs of Gangajalghati CD Block
	Onda	None	Onda CD Block; and Bikna, Kosthia, Narrah and Sanbandha GPs of Bankura II CD Block
	Bishnupur	Open	Bishnupur municipality; Bishnupur; and Amdangra, Saltora and Satmauli GPs of Taldangra CD Block
	Katulpur	SC	Deshrahkoyalpara, Gopinathpur, Kotulpur, Lego, Mirzapur and Sihar GPs of Kotulpur CD Block; Gelia, Jagannathpur, Kuchiakol, Maynapur, Salda, Uttarbarh, Hetia, Routkhanda and Shyamnagar GPs of Joypur CD Block
	Indas	SC	Indas CD Block; Balsi I, Balsi II, Biur Betur, Jamkuri and Kushdwip GPs of Patrasayer CD Block; and Laugram, Madanmohanpur GPs of Kotulpur CD Block
	Sonamukhi	SC	Sonamukhi municipality; Sonamukhi CD Block; and Belut Rasulpur, Beersingha, Hamirpur, Narayanpur and Patrasayar GPs of Patrasayer CD Block
	Khandaghosh	None	In Bardhaman district

== Notable people ==
- Khan Bahadur Dr. Syed Muhammed Siddique, MLA for Bankura
