= Surajit Dhara =

Indian physicist

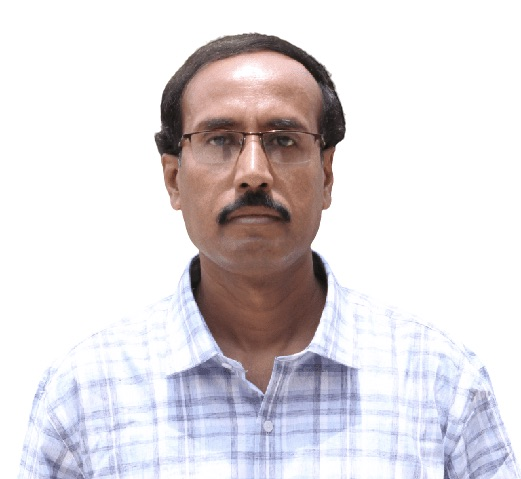
- Born: 28 February 1975 (age 51); West Bengal
- Citizenship: Indian
- Education: Tokyo Institute of Technology, Raman Research Institute, Burdwan University
- Scientific career
- Fields: Physical Science
- Workplaces: School of Physics, University of Hyderabad
- Website: surajitdhara.in

Surajit Dhara (born 28 February 1975) is an Indian physicist affiliated to the School of Physics in University of Hyderabad, Telangana, in various capacities since 2006. His area of special interest is soft matter physics. He studies control and manipulation of topological defects of liquid crystals, elasticity and defect mediated directed assembly, topological active matter, rheology and photonics of liquid crystals. He is a recipient of the Shanti Swarup Bhatnagar Prize for Science and Technology for his contributions to physical sciences in 2020.

Surajit Dhara obtained his B.Sc. degree from Ramananda College (Bishnupur) in 1995, M.Sc. degree from University of Burdwan in 1998 and Ph.D. degree from Raman Research Institute, Bangalore, in 2004. He was a postdoctoral fellow in Tokyo Institute of Technology, Japan, in 2008, a visiting scientist at Jozef Stefan Institute, University of Ljubljana, Slovenia, during 2013–2018 and a visiting professor at Ulsan National Institute of Science and Technology, South Korea, in 2018. In 2021, he became a laureate of the Asian Scientist 100 by the Asian Scientist.
