= Tanmay Ghosh =

Indian politician

Member of the West Bengal Legislative Assembly
- In office 2 May 2021 – 4 May 2026
- Preceded by: Tushar Kanti Bhattacharya
- Succeeded by: Shukla Chatterjee
- Constituency: Bishnupur

Personal details
- Party: Trinamool Congress (2021–present); Bharatiya Janata Party (until 2021)
- Education: Ramananda College
- Profession: Businessman

Tanmay Ghosh is an Indian politician from Trinamool Congress. In May 2021, he was elected as a member of the West Bengal Legislative Assembly from Bishnupur (constituency). He defeated Archita Bid of Trinamool Congress by 11,133 votes in the 2021 West Bengal Assembly election. On 30 August 2021 he joined Trinamool Congress.
