= Ajodhya, Bankura =

Ajodhya
- Village
- Location in West Bengal, India Ajodhya (India)
- Coordinates: 23.154388°N 87.279252°E
- Country: India
- State: West Bengal
- District: Bankura

Population (2011)
  - Total: 2,862

Languages
  - Official: Bengali, English
- Time zone: UTC+5:30 (IST)
- PIN: 722163
- Telephone/STD code: 03244
- Lok Sabha constituency: Bishnupur
- Vidhan Sabha constituency: Bishnupur
- Website: bankura.gov.in

Ajodhya is a village in the Bishnupur CD block in the Bishnupur subdivision of the Bankura district in the state of West Bengal, India.

== Geography ==
Places in Bishnupur subdivision in Bankura district
M: Municipal town, CT: census town, R: rural/ urban centre, T: ancient/ temple centre
Owing to space constraints in the small map, the actual locations in a larger map may vary slightly

=== Location ===
Ajodhya is located at 23.154388°N 87.279252°E.

=== Area overview ===
The map alongside shows the Bishnupur subdivision of Bankura district. Physiographically, this area has fertile low lying alluvial plains. It is a predominantly rural area with 90.06% of the population living in rural areas and only 8.94% living in the urban areas. It was a part of the core area of Mallabhum.

Note: The map alongside presents some of the notable locations in the subdivision. All places marked in the map are linked in the larger full screen map.

== Demographics ==
According to the 2011 Census of India, Ajodhya had a total population of 2,862, of which 1,445 (50%) were males and 1,417 (50%) were females. There were 280 persons in the age range of 0–6 years. The total number of literate persons in Ajodhya was 1,880 (72.81% of the population over 6 years).

== Education ==
Ajodhya High School is a Bengali-medium coeducational institution established in 1954. It has facilities for teaching from class V to class XII. The school has 10 computers and a library with 1,900 books.

== History and culture ==
In the village of Ayodhya, there is the famous house of the famous Bandyopadhyay. In approximately 1805, Nitai Bandyopadhyay's son Rammohan Bandyopadhyay started the zamindari. This zamindar was the owner of 22 Nilkuthi and 46 mauzas. Rammohan Banerjee was very pious, just and generous. Bhai Gadadhar Bandyopadhyay subsequently further improved the zamindari.

Further more, there are twelfth Shiva temple on the left side of Singhadwar, Girigovardhan temple in front, along with Dolmandir and Jhulan temple, Ras temple on the right side, besides there are Durgamandir, Natmandir and Radhadamodarjiur temple. The Radhadamodarjiu temple has two shalgram rocks - the smaller one is Radhadamodarjiu, and the bigger one is Vanshigopaljeu. The Girigovardhan temple was built around 1835 AD. This temple is a sign of a novel construction style.

David J. McCutchion mentions the Rasmancha (Ras-temple) at Ajodhya as a saptadasa-ratna with rekha turrets.

== Gallery ==
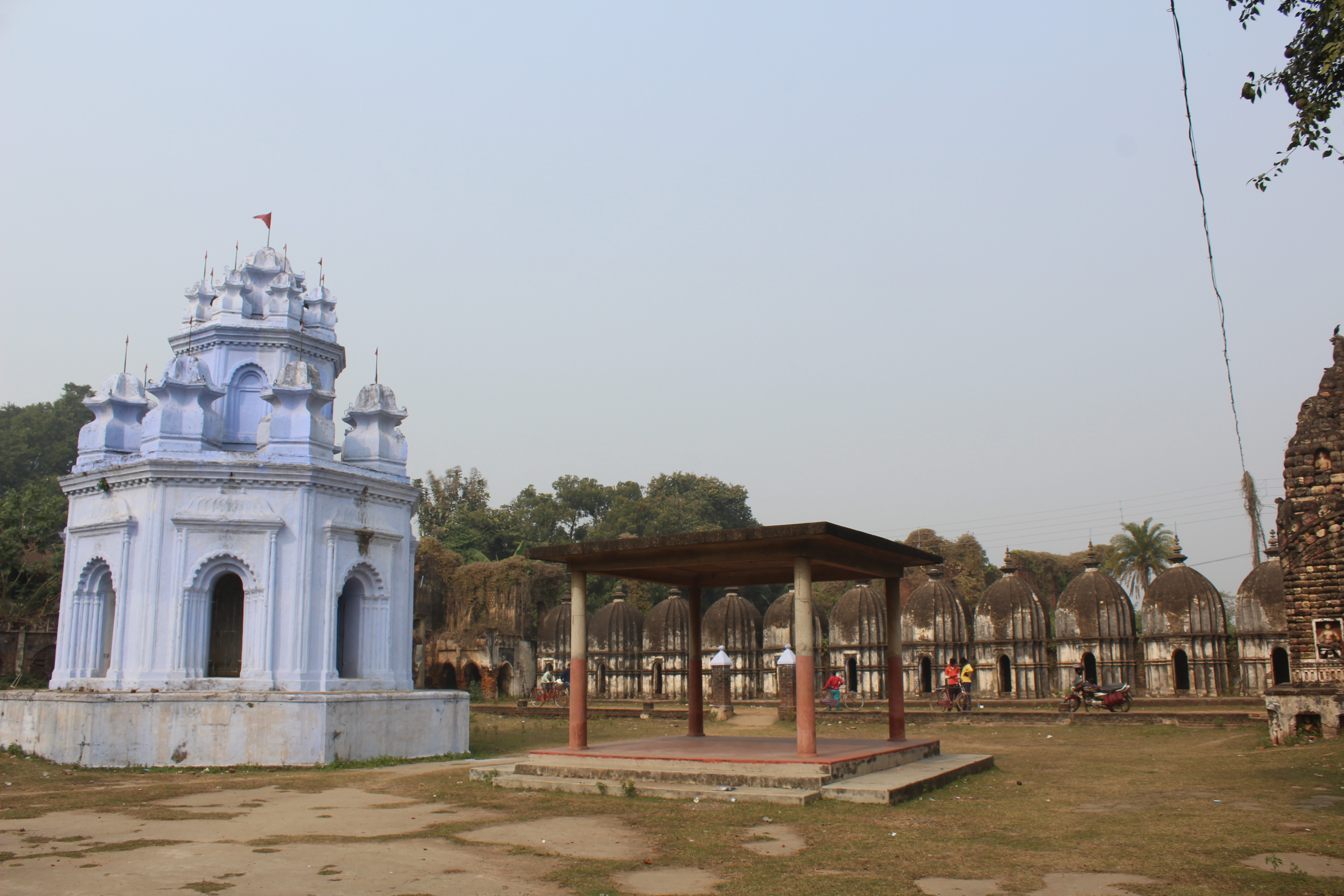
12 Shiva temples with Rasmancha

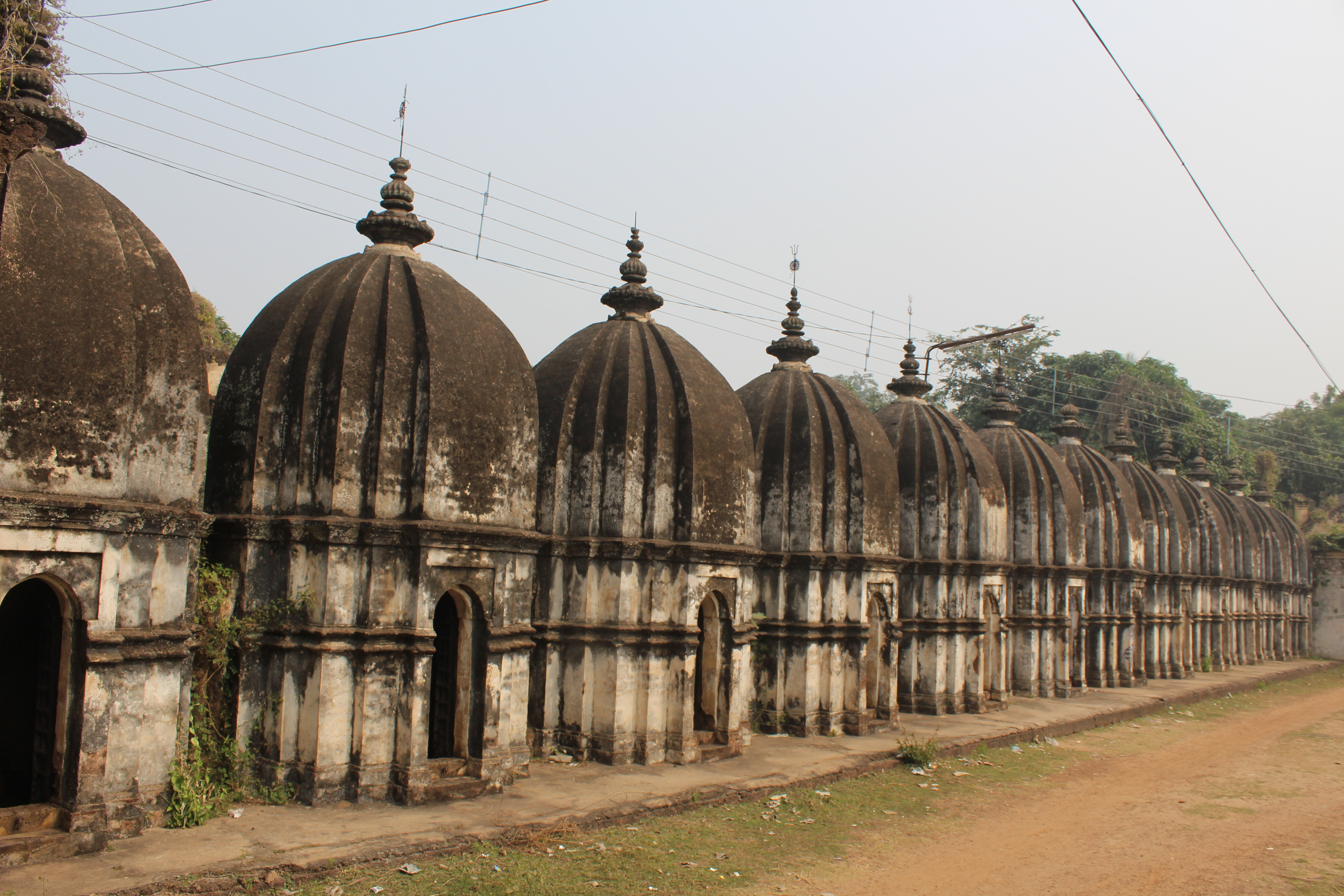
12 Shiva temples

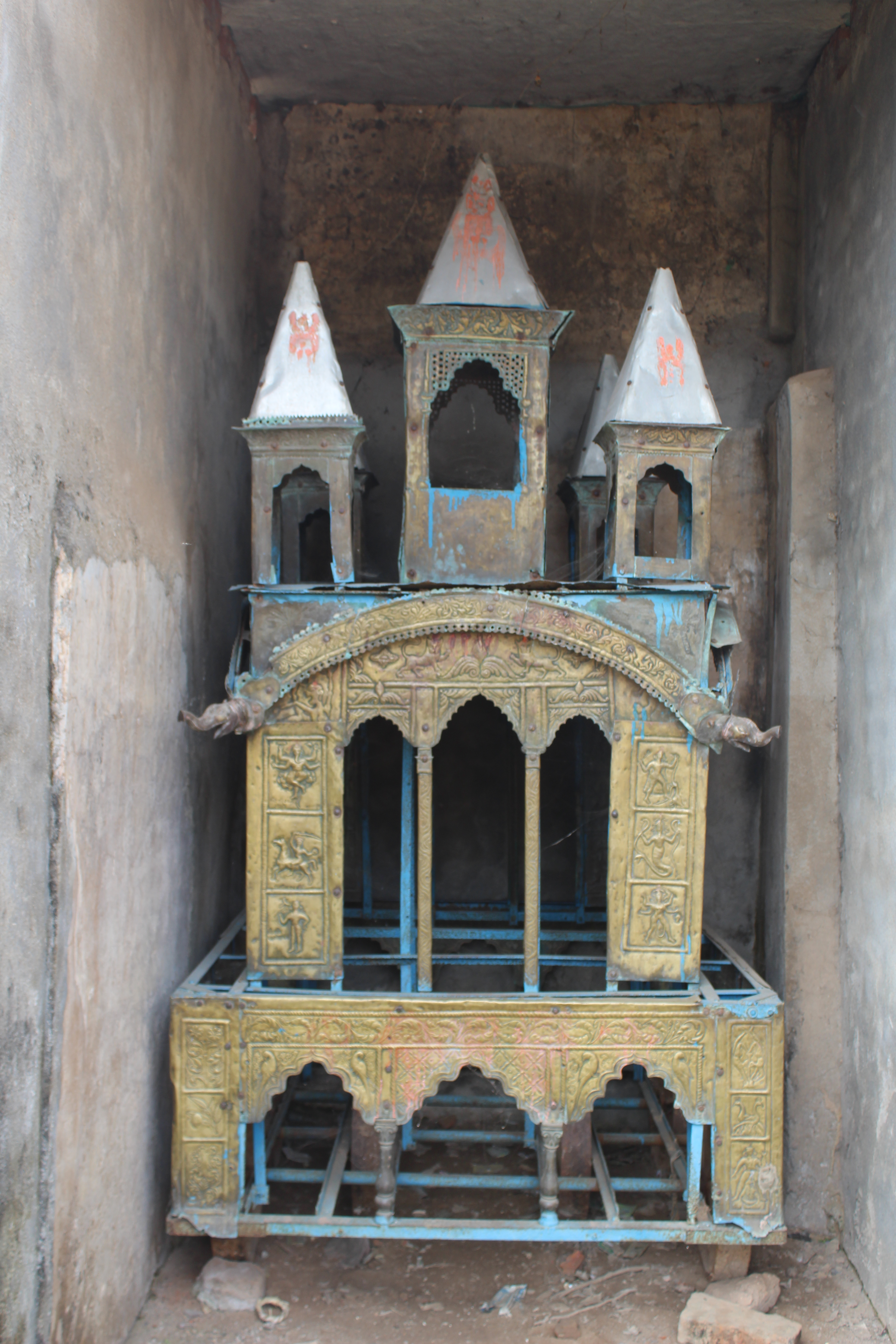
Brass ratha

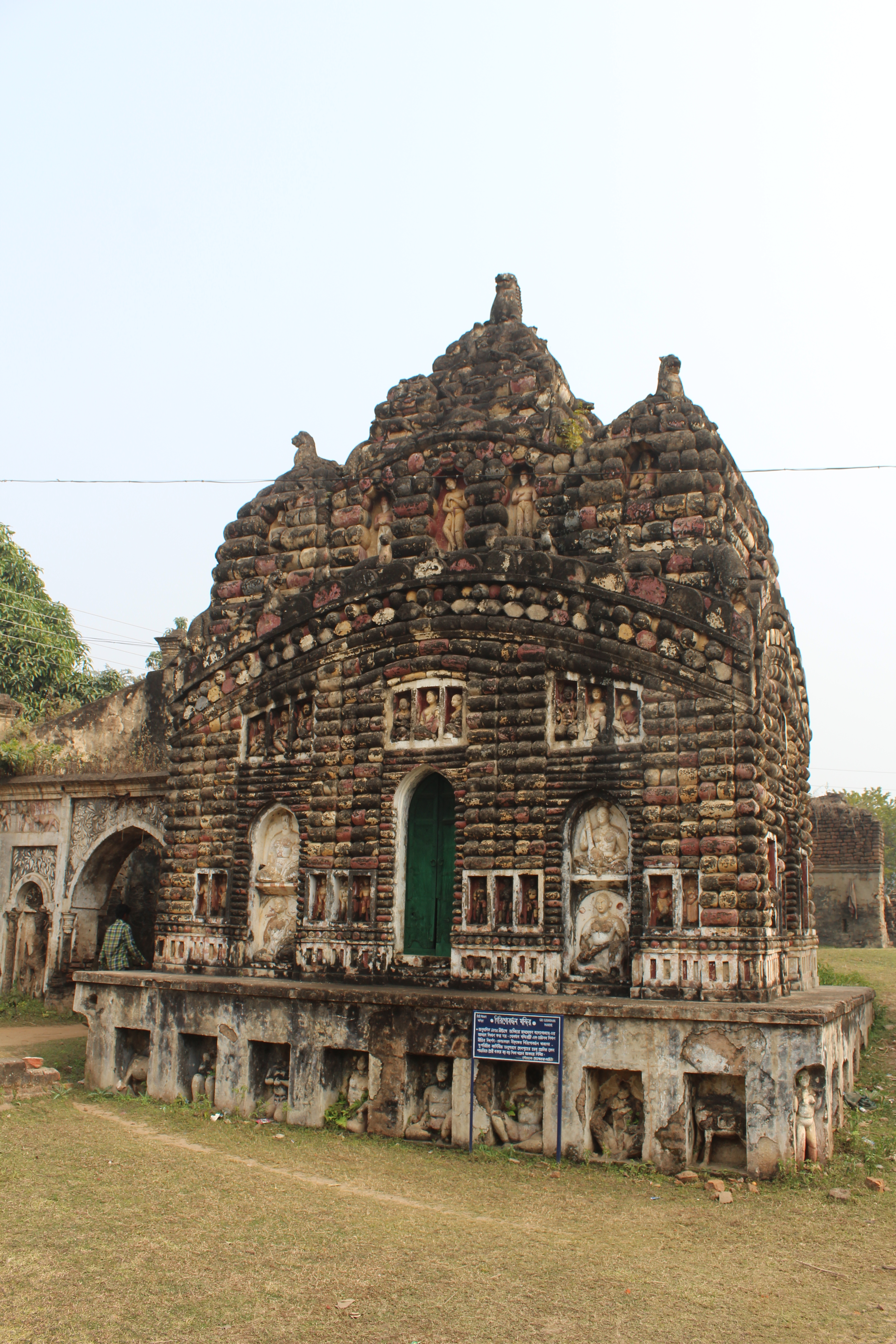
Girigovardhan Mountain (1835)

== Healthcare ==
There is a primary health centre at Ajodhya, with 6 beds.
