= Akui =

- Village
- Location in West Bengal, India Akui (India)
- Coordinates: 23.1039°N 87.7296°E
- Country: India
- State: West Bengal
- District: Bankura

Population (2011)
  - Total: 6,115

Languages
  - Official: Bengali, English
- Time zone: UTC+5:30 (IST)
- PIN: 722201
- Telephone/STD code: 03244
- Lok Sabha constituency: Bishnupur
- Vidhan Sabha constituency: Indas
- Website: bankura.gov.in

Akui is a village in the Indas CD block in the Bishnupur subdivision of the Bankura district in the state of West Bengal, India.

== Geography ==
Places in Bishnupur subdivision in Bankura district
M: Municipal town, CT: census town, R: rural/ urban centre, T: ancient/ temple centre
Owing to space constraints in the small map, the actual locations in a larger map may vary slightly

=== Location ===
Akui is located at 23.1039°N 87.7296°E.

Note: The map alongside presents some of the notable locations in the subdivision. All places marked in the map are linked in the larger full screen map.

== Demographics ==
According to the 2011 Census of India, Akui had a total population of 6,115, of which 3,118 (51%) were males and 2,997 (49%) were females. There were 603 persons in the age range of 0–6 years. The total number of literate persons in Akui was 4,237 (76.87% of the population over 6 years).

== Education ==
Akui Kamalabala Women's College was established at Akui in 2015. Affiliated with the Bankura University, it offers honours courses in Bengali, English, philosophy and a general course in humanities.

== Culture ==
David J. McCutchion mentions the Radha Kanta temple as a pancha-ratna with ridged rekha turrets and porch on triple archway, brick-built structure with a rich terracotta façade, constructed in 1764.

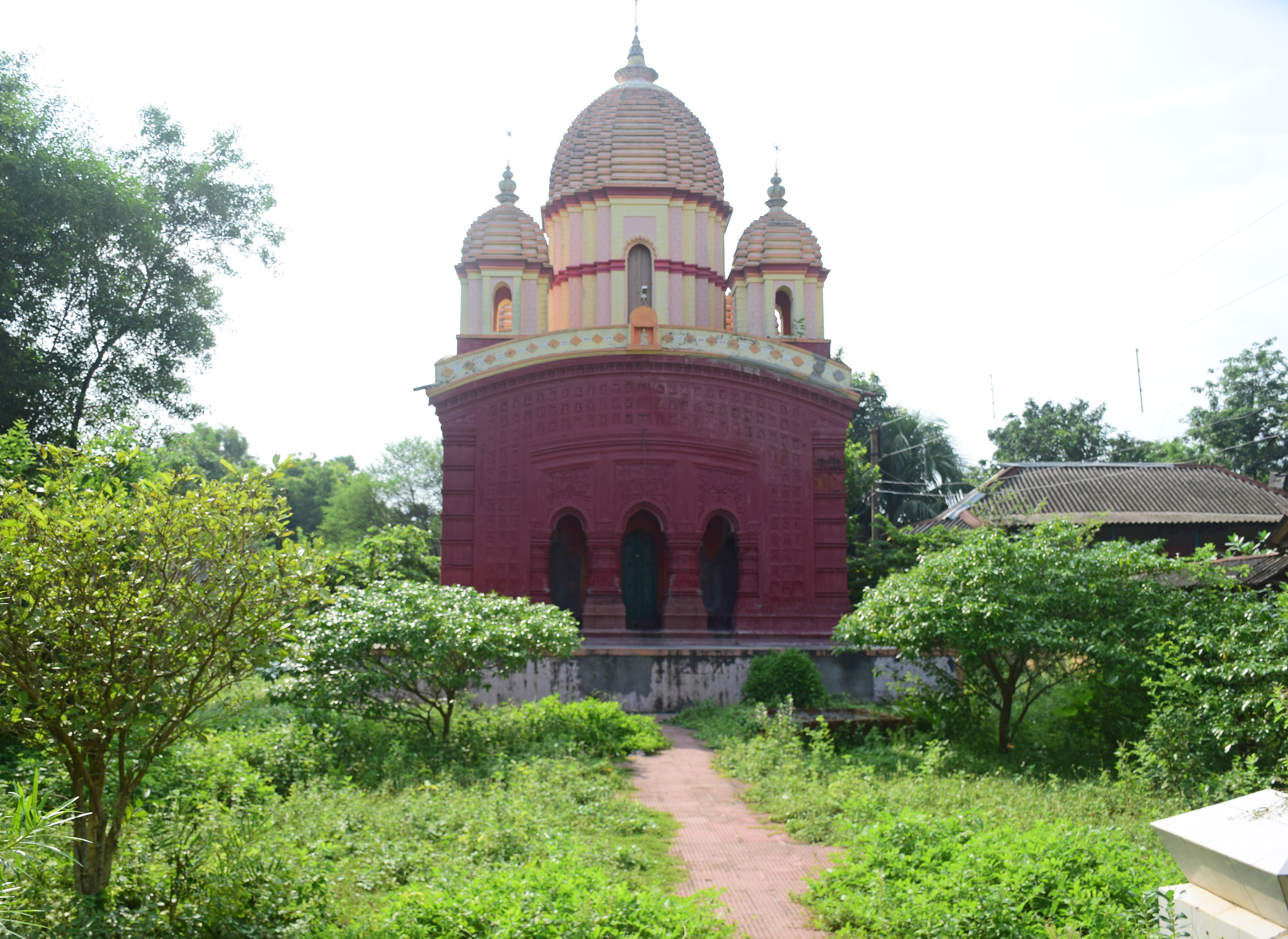
Radhakanta Temple

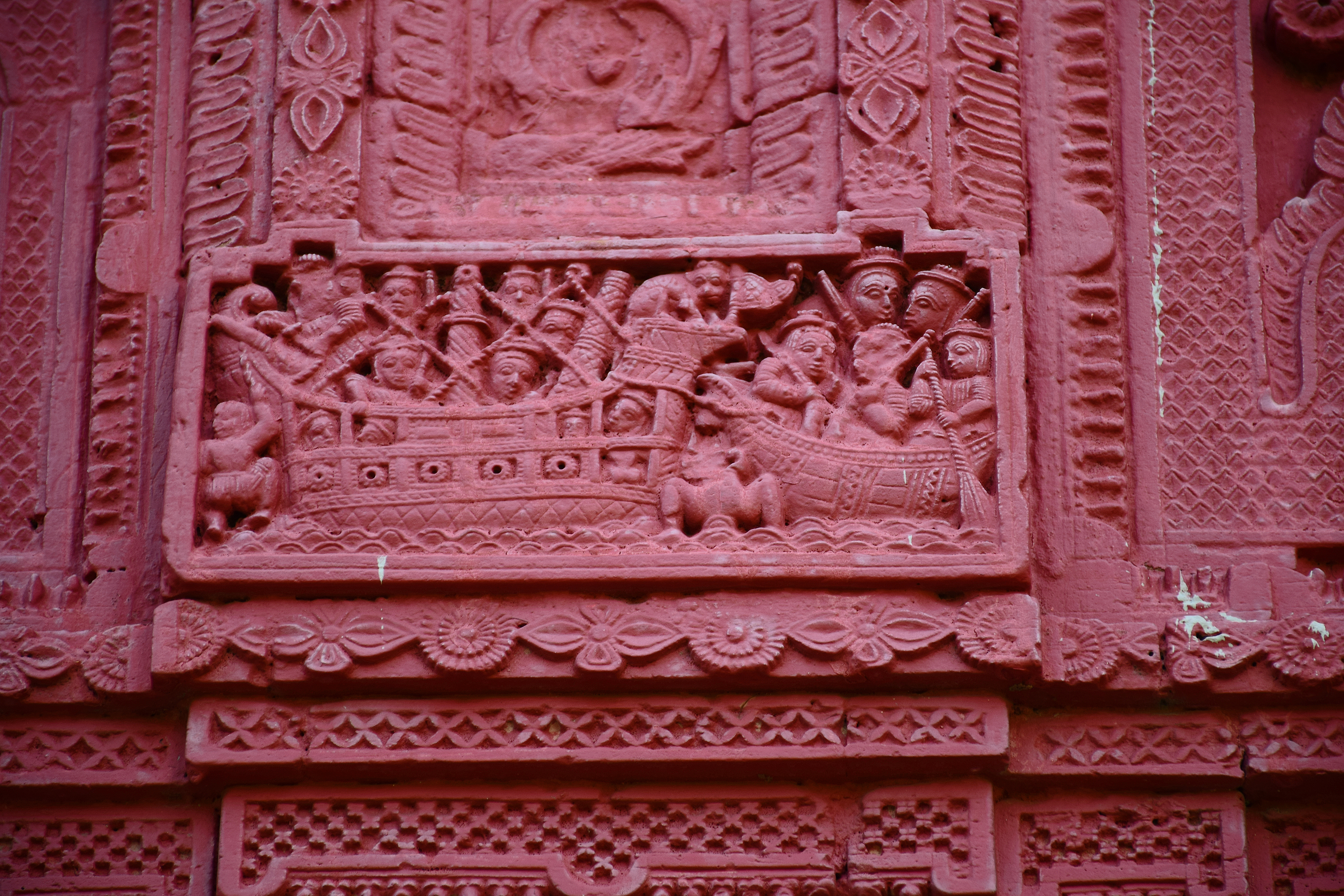
Terracotta relief

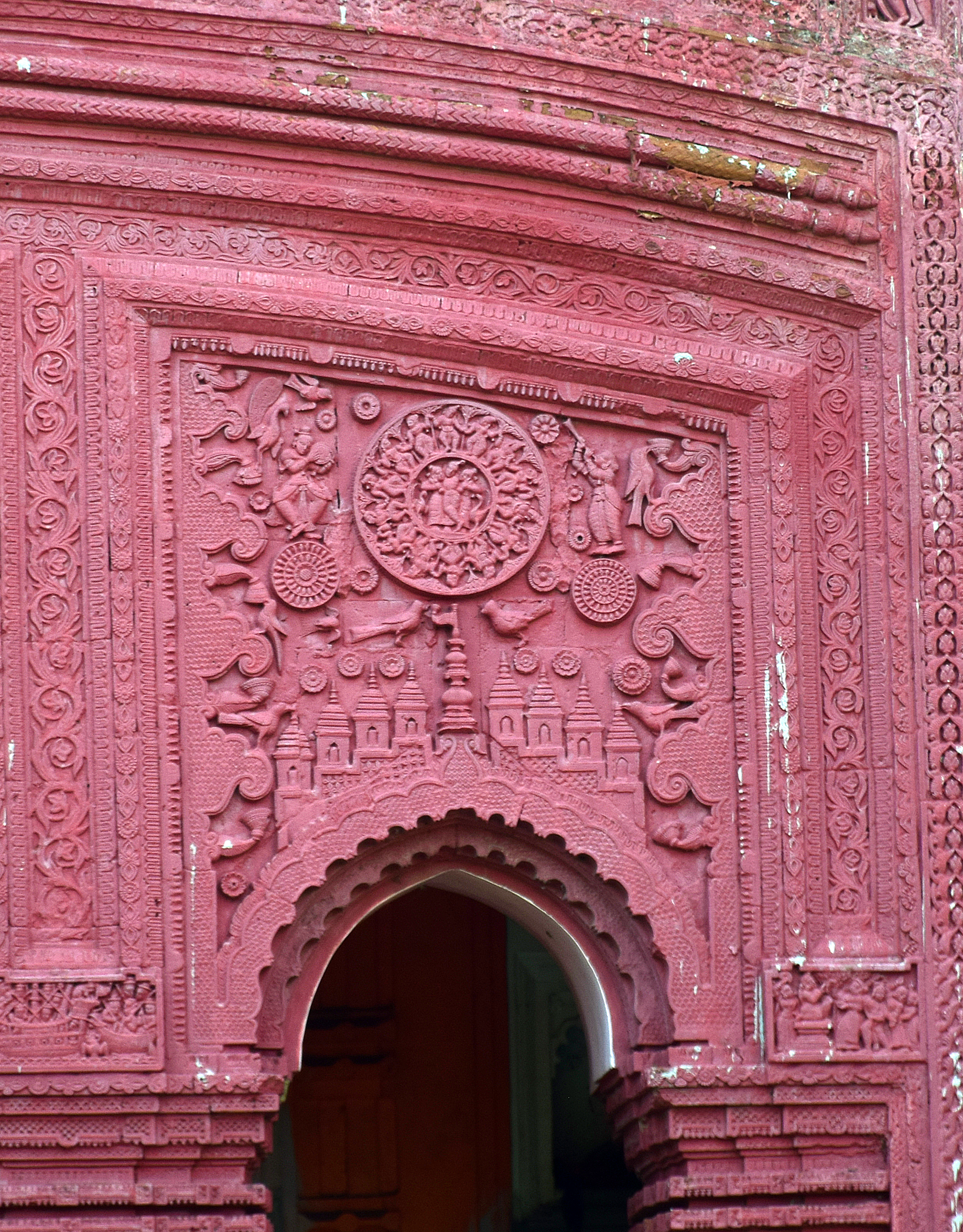
Terracotta relief

== Healthcare ==
There is a primary health centre at Akui, with 4 beds.
