= Gurupada Mete =

Indian politician

Gurupada Mete (1969 – 1 October 2020) was an Indian politician from West Bengal. He was a former two time member of the West Bengal Legislative Assembly from Indas Assembly constituency, which was reserved for Scheduled Caste community, in Bankura district. He won the 2011 and 2016 West Bengal Legislative Assembly election representing the All India Trinamool Congress. He died on 1 October 2020 due to COVID-19.

== Early life and education ==
Mete was from Indas, Bankura district, West Bengal. He was the son of late Sasadhar Mete. He studied Class 10 but failed to clear the Madhyamik Pariksha. Later, he discontinued his studies. He was into farming.

== Career ==
Mete first became an MLA winning from Indas Assembly constituency representing the All India Trinamool Congress in the 2011 West Bengal Legislative Assembly election. He polled 85,589 votes and defeated his nearest rival, Santanu Kumar Bora of the Communist Party of India (Marxist), by a margin of 4,005 votes. He retained the seat for the All India Trinamool Congress winning the 2016 West Bengal Legislative Assembly election defeating Dilip Kumar Malik, also of the Communist Party of India (Marxist), by a margin of 18,837 votes.

=== Death ===
Mete died of COVID-19 at a private hospital in Howrah on 1 October 2020. He was in the hospital for about a month and suffered multiple complications related to heart and kidney.
