= Shukla Chatterjee =

Indian politician (born 1978)

Shukla Chatterjee (born 1978) is an Indian politician from West Bengal. She is a member of the West Bengal Legislative Assembly from the Bishnupur, Bankura Assembly constituency in Bankura district representing the Bharatiya Janata Party.

== Early life and education ==
Chatterjee is from Bishnupur, Bankura district, West Bengal. She is the wife of Rajib Chatterjee. She completed her Bachelor of Arts at a college affiliated with University of Burdwan in 1998. She declared assets worth Rs.5 lakhs in her affidavit to the Election Commission of India.

== Career ==
Chatterjee won the Bishnupur, Bankura Assembly constituency representing the Bharatiya Janata Party in the 2026 West Bengal Legislative Assembly election. She polled 1,11,082 votes and defeated her nearest rival, Tanmay Ghosh of the All India Trinamool Congress by a margin of 30,605 votes.
