= Indas =

- Village
- Location in West Bengal, India Indas (India)
- Coordinates: 23°09′10.8″N 87°37′55.2″E
- Country: India
- State: West Bengal
- District: Bankura

Population (2011)
  - Total: 50,000

Languages
  - Official: Bengali, English
- Time zone: UTC+5:30 (IST)
- PIN: 722205 (Indas)
- Telephone/STD code: 03244
- Lok Sabha constituency: Bishnupur
- Vidhan Sabha constituency: Indas
- Website: bankura.gov.in

Indas (also spelled Indus) is a village, with a police station, in the Indas CD block in the Bishnupur subdivision of the Bankura district in the state of West Bengal, India.

== Geography ==
Places in Bishnupur subdivision in Bankura district
M: Municipal town, CT: census town, R: rural/ urban centre, T: ancient/ temple centre
Owing to space constraints in the small map, the actual locations in a larger map may vary slightly

=== Location ===
Indas is located at 23°09′10.8″N 87°37′55.2″E.

=== Area overview ===
The map alongside shows the Bishnupur subdivision of Bankura district. Physiographically, this area has fertile low lying alluvial plains. It is a predominantly rural area with 90.06% of the population living in rural areas and only 8.94% living in the urban areas. It was a part of the core area of Mallabhum.

Note: The map alongside presents some of the notable locations in the subdivision. All places marked in the map are linked in the larger full screen map.

== Demographics ==
As per 2011 Census of India Indas had a total population of 2,479 of which 1,284 (52%) were males and 1,195 (48%) were females. Population below 6 years was 256. The total number of literates in Indas was 1,440 (64.78% of the population over 6 years).

== Civic administration ==
=== Police station ===
Indas police station has jurisdiction over Indas CD block. The area covered is 255.10 km^{2} with a population of 152,829.

=== CD block HQ ===
The headquarters of Indas CD block are located at Indas.

== Transport ==
Indas railway station, 68.5 km from Bankura, is a station on the Bankura-Masagram line (formerly Bankura Damodar Railway) of South Eastern Railway. As of September 2016, DEMU services were available between Bankura and Mathnasibpur. Bankura -Masagram line ( formerly B.D.R) expanded from October 2017 to Masagram Junction.

== Education ==
Indas Mahavidyalaya is a coeducational institution affiliated to the University of Bankura. It was established in 2006 and offers courses in arts and science. Now Indas Mahavidyalaya is affiliated to Bankura University from the year 2017-2026 educational year.

Indas High School is a Bengali medium boys school established in 1893. It is a higher secondary school (classes 6 to 12). It is a government school.

Indas Girls High School is a Bengali medium higher secondary school (classes 6 - 12) for girls, established in 1956. It is a government school. It has 9 class rooms, 19 teachers and 10 computers.

Dakshin Damodar Academy is an English medium CBSE-affiliated school from class 1 to 5. It is a private school.

== Culture ==
David J. McCutchion mentions the Radha Damodara temple of the Sarkar family as a navaratna temple with terracotta façade built in 1796.

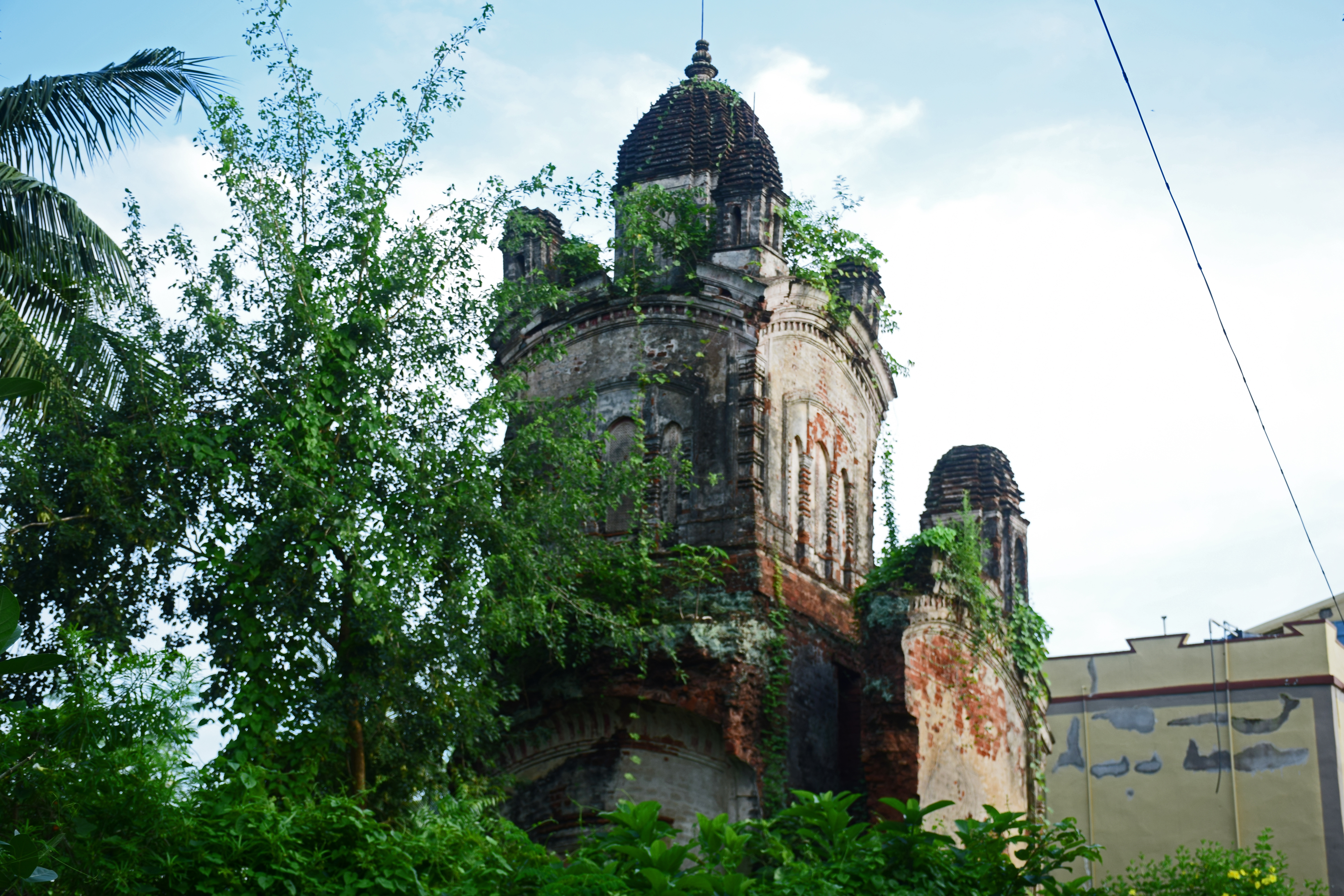
Nabaratna Damodara temple (partially damaged)

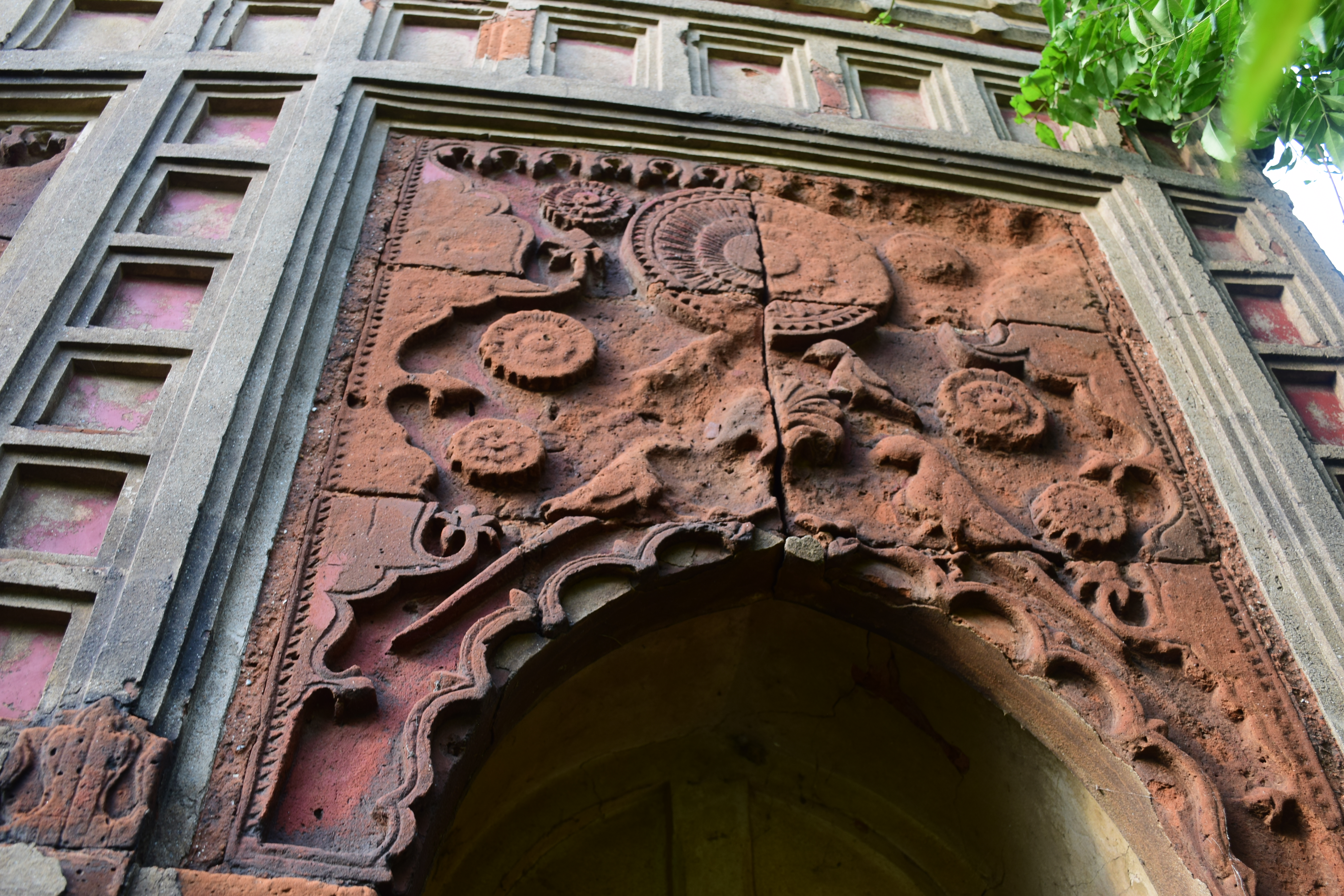
Terracotta plaque

== Healthcare ==
Indas Rural Hospital, with 30 beds at Indas, is the major government medical facility in the Indas CD block. There are primary health centres at Akui (with 4 beds), Keneti (Santasram Indus) (with 10 beds) and Dighalgram (with 6 beds).
