= Bhara =

- Village
- Location in West Bengal, India Bhara (India)
- Coordinates: 23.162343°N 87.387657°E
- Country: India
- State: West Bengal
- District: Bankura

Population (2011)
  - Total: 2,970

Languages
  - Official: Bengali, English
- Time zone: UTC+5:30 (IST)
- PIN: 722157
- Telephone/STD code: 03244
- Lok Sabha constituency: Bishnupur
- Vidhan Sabha constituency: Bishnupur
- Website: bankura.gov.in

Bhara is a village in the Bishnupur CD block in the Bishnupur subdivision of the Bankura district in the state of West Bengal, India.

== Geography ==
Places in Bishnupur subdivision in Bankura district
M: Municipal town, CT: census town, R: rural/ urban centre, T: ancient/ temple centre
Owing to space constraints in the small map, the actual locations in a larger map may vary slightly

=== Location ===
Bhara is located at 23.162343°N 87.387657°E.

=== Area overview ===
The map alongside shows the Bishnupur subdivision of Bankura district. Physiographically, this area has fertile low lying alluvial plains. It is a predominantly rural area with 90.06% of the population living in rural areas and only 8.94% living in the urban areas. It was a part of the core area of Mallabhum.

Note: The map alongside presents some of the notable locations in the subdivision. All places marked in the map are linked in the larger full screen map.

== Demographics ==
According to the 2011 Census of India, Bhara had a total population of 2,970, of which 1,493 (50%) were males and 1,477 (50%) were females. There were 309 persons in the age range of 0–6 years. The total number of literate persons in Bhara was 1,679 (63.10% of the population over 6 years).

== Education ==
Swami Dhananjoy Das Kathiababa Mahavidyalaya was established in 2009. Affiliated with the Bankura University it offers honours courses in Bengali, Sanskrit, English, education, history, music, geography and a general course in arts. The institution is named after the 56th Acharya of the Nimbarka Sampradaya Sri Mahanta Sri Sri 108 Swami Dhananjaya Das Kathiababa, who was born at Bhara.

Bhara Dhananjaya Das Kathiababa High School is a Bengali-medium coeducational institution established in 1903. It has facilities for teaching from class V to class XII. The school has 5 computers, a library with 2,500 books and a playground.

== Culture ==
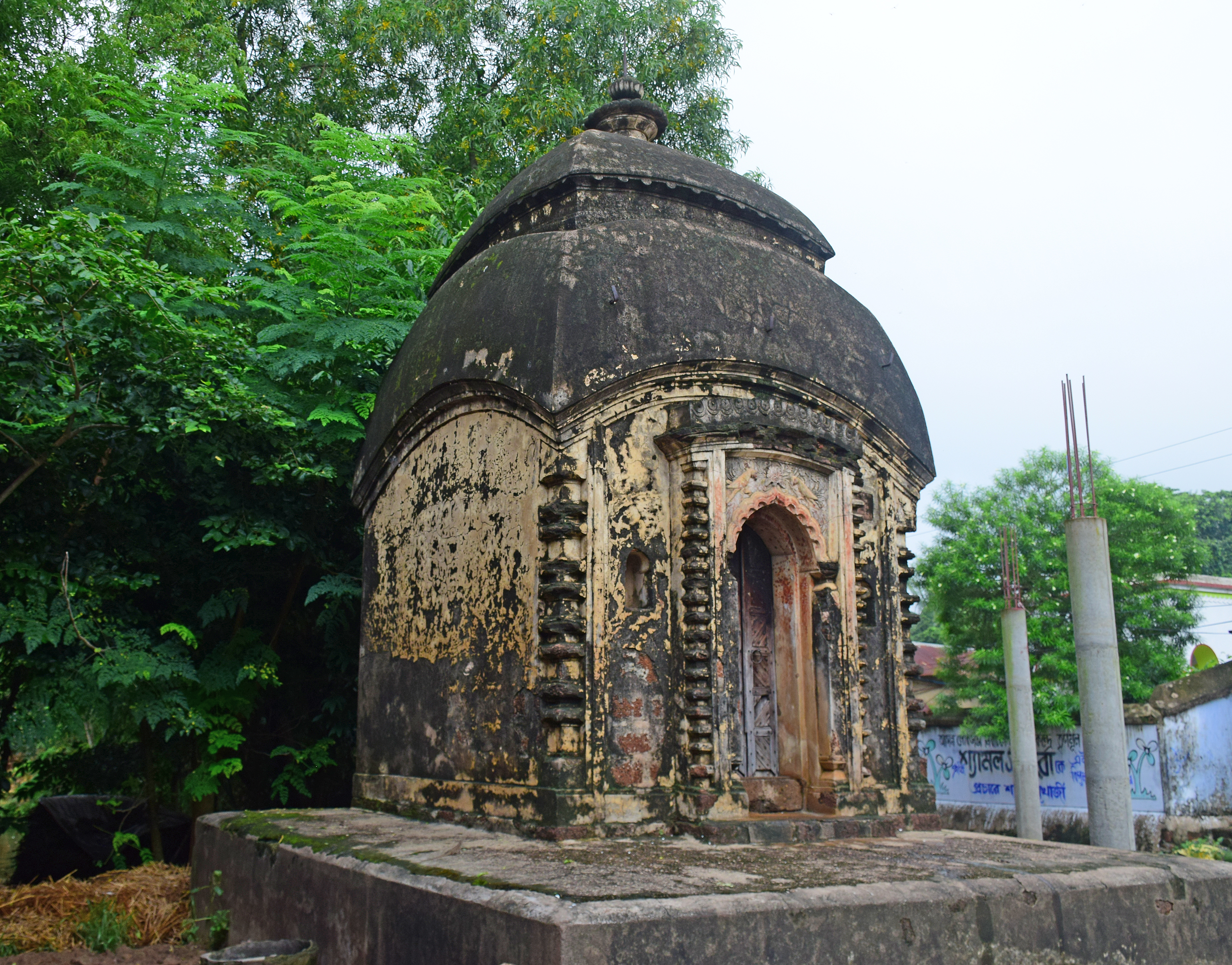
Bhara at-chala Shiva Mandir

== Healthcare ==
There is a primary health centre at Bhora, with 10 beds.
