= Ramananda College =

Public college in West Bengal, India

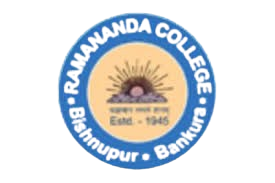
- Type: Undergraduate college , Postgraduate Public college
- Established: 1945; 81 years ago
- Founder: Radhagobinda Roy
- Affiliations: Bankura University
- President: Tanmay Ghosh
- Principal: Dr. Sudipta Kumar Ghorai
- Location: Bishnupur, West Bengal, 722122, India; 23.0649573°N 87.3250078°E
- Campus: Urban
- Website: Ramananda College
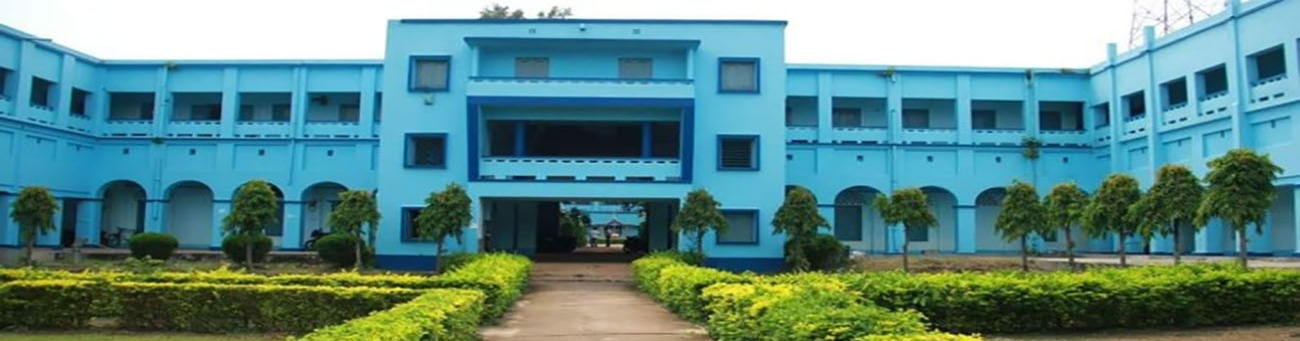

- Location within West Bengal Location within India

Ramananda College is an institution of higher education situated at Bishnupur, Bankura district, in the state of West Bengal, India. It is the only co-educational degree college at the headquarters of Bishnupur subdivision.

== History ==
Establishing a center of higher education in this historically important place was initially made by Ramnalini Chakraborthy, freedom fighter and social worker of Bishnupur. Initiative was taken by Radhagobinda Roy, founder Principal of the college and Ex- Minister, Government of West Bengal and many other eminent personalities of the town and the district. Fund was generated by the contributions of Ramnalini Chakraborthy, The Koley family of Bishnupur, Sri Anil Kumar Bhattacharya, members of the Friend's Union Club and by the donations of the common people. The college was named after the famous son of the district of Bankura, Ramananda Chatterjee (1865-1943), noted journalist, editor and scholar. He was the editor, publisher and owner of the Modern Review, a high grade illustrated monthly published in English, and Prabasi, a Bengali organ, published in the vernacular. He was pre-eminently an editor although during his useful life he was associated in many reform movements.

Since its inception in 1945, this institution has been spreading the light of higher education to the local populace and even to students who come from faraway rural areas. The latter stay in the college hostels and also in paid accommodation in Bishnupur. The college was affiliated to the University of Calcutta at inception, and then it came under the purview of the University of Burdwan and now it came under Bankura University. The College is recognized by the UGC u/s 2f and 12B. As a college established in the pre-independence era, this college predates both University Grants Commission (UGC) and the University of Burdwan.

== Departments and courses ==
The college offers courses on B.A., B.Sc., and B.Com. and aims at imparting education to all undergraduates of lower- and middle-class people of Bishnupur and its adjoining areas.

Apart from these traditional courses some add-on career oriented certificate courses are done in this college, which is sponsored by University Grants Commission (UGC).

=== Science ===
Science faculty consists of the departments of Chemistry, Physics, Mathematics, Computer Science & Application, Botany, Zoology, Physiology, Nutrition, and Economics.

=== Arts & Commerce ===
Arts faculty consists of departments of Bengali, English, Sanskrit, History, Geography, Political Science, Philosophy, Education, Music, Physical Education, and Commerce.

== Accreditation ==
The College was accredited at NAAC B++ level (score 83.15) by the National Assessment and Accreditation Council (NAAC) in the year 2007.

== Notable alumni ==
- Srikanta Sinha, Scientist, ISRO, Satellite Center, Bangalore, India
- Surajit Dhara, recipient of the Shanti Swarup Bhatnagar Prize for Science and Technology for his contributions to physical sciences in 2020
- Raja Mondal, Bishnupur
- Subham Ghosh – Co-founder and CTO of [Eva Ad Ventures].

== See also ==
- List of institutions of higher education in West Bengal
- Education in India
- Education in West Bengal
