= Shyam Mukherjee (politician) =

Indian politician

Textiles
- In office May 20, 2011 – 2013
- Governor: M. K. Narayanan

MLA
- In office May 13, 2011 – 2016
- Governor: M. K. Narayanan
- Constituency: Bishnupur

Personal details
- Party: Bharatiya Janata Party
- Other political affiliations: All India Trinamool Congress

Shyam Mukherjee is an Indian politician and was the Minister for Textiles in the Government of West Bengal till 2016. He is also an MLA, elected from the Bishnupur constituency in the 2011 West Bengal state assembly election.
