= Bishnupur Municipality =

Civic body

- Seal of Bishnupur Municipality

Type
- Type: Municipality

History
- Founded: 1873; 153 years ago

Leadership
- Chairman: Goutam Goswami, AITC
- Vice Chairman: Mahabir Agarwala, AITC

Structure
- Seats: 19
- Political groups: Government (13): AITC (13); Opposition (3): BJP (2); INC (1); Others (3): IND (3)

Elections
- Last election: 2022
- Next election: 2027

Website
- bishnupurmunicipality.com

Bishnupur Municipality is the civic body that governs Bishnupur and its surrounding areas in Bishnupur subdivision of Bankura, West Bengal, India.

== History ==
Bishnupur Municipality entrance

Bishnupur Municipality, established in 1873, is one of the oldest municipalities in West Bengal. It was created to manage the civic needs of Bishnupur town, which had become an important cultural and historical center due to its legacy under the Malla dynasty. The municipality was set up during the British colonial period, a time when urban governance was being introduced in various parts of India to ensure better management of sanitation, public health, and infrastructure in growing towns.

In 2023, Bishnupur Municipality celebrated its 150th anniversary, marking a significant milestone in its history.

== Geography ==
Bishnupur Municipality covers an area of 14.64 km^{2} and has a total population of 67783 (2011).

== Healthcare ==
Healthcare facilities in Bishnupur municipality
Hospital / PHC / Private Hospital	Seat Capacity
Bishnupur District Hospital	300
Bishnupur Super Speciality Hospital	100
Ajodhya PHC	6
Bhora PHC	10
Kankila PHC	6
Bishnupur Nursing Home & Diagnostic	35
Lakeview Nursing Home	15
Lifeline Nursing Home	20

== Elections ==
In the 2022 municipal elections for Bishnupur Municipality TMC won 13 seats, Independent candidates won 3 seats, BJP won 2 seats, Congress 1 seat and Independents 2 seats.

== List of councillors ==
Ward	Name	Party
1	Sunil Kumar Das	All India Trinamool Congress
2	Dayal Patra	All India Trinamool Congress
3	Ipsita Bose	All India Trinamool Congress
4	Srikanta Banerjee	Indian National Congress
5	Ajay Kshetrapal	All India Trinamool Congress
6	Shankhajit Ray	Bharatiya Janata Party
7	Rita Bandyopadhyay	All India Trinamool Congress
8	Sanjay Mukherjee	Independent politician
9	Mahabir Agarwala	All India Trinamool Congress
10	Shukla Chatterjee	Bharatiya Janata Party
11	Debjit Kundu	Independent politician
12	Hiralal Dutta	Independent politician
13	Vacant	Independent politician
14	Priyanka Karnga	All India Trinamool Congress
15	Siddhartha Nag	All India Trinamool Congress
16	Tumpa Das Mahanta Saha	All India Trinamool Congress
17	Goutam Goswami	All India Trinamool Congress
18	Sujata Ganguli	All India Trinamool Congress
19	Atanu Mondal	All India Trinamool Congress
