= Indas Assembly constituency =

Indas
- Constituency No. 257 for the West Bengal Legislative Assembly
- Interactive Map Outlining Indas Assembly Constituency

Constituency details
- Country: India
- Region: East India
- State: West Bengal
- District: Bankura
- Lok Sabha constituency: Bishnupur
- Established: 1967
- Total electors: 1,88,607
- Reservation: SC

Member of Legislative Assembly
- 18th West Bengal Legislative Assembly
- Incumbent Nirmal Kumar Dhara
- Party: BJP
- Alliance: NDA
- Elected year: 2026

Indas Assembly constituency is an assembly constituency in Bankura district in the Indian state of West Bengal. It is reserved for scheduled castes.

== Overview ==
As per orders of the Delimitation Commission, No. 257 Indas Assembly constituency (SC) is composed of the following: Indas community development block; Balsi I, Balsi II, Biur Betur, Jamkuri and Kushdwip gram panchayats of Patrasayer community development block; and Laugram, Madanmohanpur gram panchayats of Kotulpur community development block.

Indas Assembly constituency is part of No. 37 Bishnupur (Lok Sabha constituency).

== Members of the Legislative Assembly ==
Year	Members	Party
1967	P.C.Mal	Bangla Congress
1969	Abani Kumar Saha	Bangla Congress
1971	Badan Bora	Communist Party of India
1972	Sanatan Santra	Indian National Congress
1977	Badan Bora	Communist Party of India (Marxist)
1982	Badan Bora	Communist Party of India (Marxist)
1987	Badan Bora	Communist Party of India (Marxist)
1991	Nanda Dulal Majhi	Communist Party of India (Marxist)
1996	Nanda Dulal Majhi	Communist Party of India (Marxist)
2001	Nanda Dulal Majhi	Communist Party of India (Marxist)
2006	Mahadeb Patra	Communist Party of India (Marxist)
2011	Gurupada Mete	Trinamool Congress
2016	Gurupada Mete	Trinamool Congress
2021	Nirmal Kumar Dhara	Bharatiya Janata Party
2026	Nirmal Kumar Dhara	Bharatiya Janata Party

== Election results ==
=== 2026 ===
2026 West Bengal Legislative Assembly election: Indus
Party	Candidate	Votes	%	±%
BJP	Nirmal Kumar Dhara	108,733	46.79	▼1.25
AITC	Shayamoli Roy Bagdi	107,833	46.40	▲1.67
CPI(M)	Jharna Malik	7,027	3.02	▼2.76
INC	Mou Mandal Samanta	2,201	0.95	New entry
NOTA	None of the above	1,582	0.68	▼0.78
Majority		900	0.4	▼2.91
Turnout		230,812	94.8	▲4.88
BJP hold		Swing		

=== 2021 ===
2021 West Bengal Legislative Assembly election: Indas
Party	Candidate	Votes	%	±%
BJP	Nirmal Kumar Dhara	104,936	48.04	▲39.8
AITC	Runu Mete	97,716	44.73	▼3.41
CPI(M)	Nayan Kumar Shil	12,619	5.78	▼32.81
NOTA	None of the Above	3,182	1.46	▼0.4
Majority		7,220	3.31	▼6.24
Turnout		2,18,453	89.92	▼0.1
BJP gain from AITC		Swing		

=== 2016 ===
2016 West Bengal Legislative Assembly election: Indas
Party	Candidate	Votes	%	±%
AITC	Gurupada Mete	94,940	48.14	▼0.91
CPI(M)	Dilip Kumar Malik	76,103	38.59	▼8.17
BJP	Nirmal Kumar Dhara	16,246	8.24	▲4.05
Independent	Basudeb Diger	3,837	1.95	New
NOTA	None of the Above	3,670	1.86	New
Majority		18,837	9.55	▲7.26
Turnout		1,97,205	90.02	▼2.43
AITC hold		Swing		

=== 2011 ===
2011 West Bengal state assembly election: Indas
Party	Candidate	Votes	%	±%
AITC	Gurupada Mete	85,589	49.05	▲11.20
CPI(M)	Santanu Kumar Bora	81,584	46.76	▼17.29
BJP	Srikanta Bagdi	7,319	4.19	
Majority		4,005	2.29	
Turnout		174,492	92.52	
AITC gain from CPI(M)		Swing	28.49	

.# Swing calculated on Congress+Trinamool Congress vote percentages taken together in 2006.

=== 1977-2006 ===
In the 2006 state assembly elections, Mahadeb Patra of CPI(M) won the Indas assembly seat defeating his nearest rival Basudeb Digar of Trinamool Congress. Contests in most years were multi cornered but only winners and runners are being mentioned. Nanda Dulal Majhi of CPI(M) defeated Purnima Lohar of Trinamool Congress in 2001, Naba Kumar Rajak of Congress in 1996 and Sanatan Santra of Congress in 1991. Badan Bora of CPI(M) defeated Piru Chandra Pandit of Congress in 1987, Gour Chandra Lohar of Congress in 1982 and Nabadurga of Janata Party in 1977.

=== 1967-1972 ===
Sanatan Santra of Congress won in 1972. Badan Bora of CPI(M) won in 1971. Abani Kumar Saha of Bangla Congress won in 1969. P.C.Mal of Bangla Congress in 1967. Prior to that the Indas seat did not exist.
