= Bishnupur, Bankura Assembly constituency =

Bishnupur
- Constituency No. 255 for the West Bengal Legislative Assembly
- Interactive Map Outlining Bishnupur Assembly Constituency

Constituency details
- Country: India
- Region: East India
- State: West Bengal
- District: Bankura
- Lok Sabha constituency: Bishnupur
- Established: 1951
- Total electors: 170,838
- Reservation: None

Member of Legislative Assembly
- 18th West Bengal Legislative Assembly
- Incumbent Shukla Chatterjee
- Party: BJP
- Alliance: BJP+
- Elected year: 2026

Bishnupur Assembly constituency is an assembly constituency in Bankura district in the Indian state of West Bengal.

== Overview ==
As per orders of the Delimitation Commission, No. 255 Bishnupur Assembly constituency is composed of the following: Bishnupur municipality; Bishnupur community development block; and Amdangra, Saltora and Satmauli gram panchayats of Taldangra community development block.

Bishnupur Assembly constituency is part of No. 37 Bishnupur Lok Sabha constituency.

== Members of the Legislative Assembly ==
Year	Name	Party
1952	Kiran Chandra Digar	Indian National Congress
1952	Radha Gobinda Roy	Indian National Congress
1957	Purabi Mukhopadhyay	Indian National Congress
1957	Kiran Chandra Digar	Indian National Congress
1962	Radhika Dhibar	Communist Party of India (Marxist)
1967	B.C. Mondal	Indian National Congress
1969	Sasthidas Sarkar	Bangla Congress
1971	Bhabataran Chakravarty	Indian National Congress
1972	Bhabataran Chakravarty	Indian National Congress
1977	Achintya Krishna Ray	Communist Party of India
1982	Achintya Krishna Ray	Communist Party of India
1987	Achintya Krishna Ray	Communist Party of India
1991	Achintya Krishna Ray	Communist Party of India
1996	Jayanta Chaudhury	Communist Party of India
2001	Jayanta Chaudhury	Communist Party of India
2006	Swapan Ghosh	Communist Party of India
2011	Shyam Mukherjee	Trinamool Congress
2016	Tushar Kanti Bhattacharya	Indian National Congress
2021	Tanmay Ghosh	Bharatiya Janata Party
2026	Shukla Chatterjee	Bharatiya Janata Party

== Election results ==
=== 2026 ===
2026 West Bengal Legislative Assembly election: Bishnupur
Party	Candidate	Votes	%	±%
BJP	Shukla Chatterjee	111,082	53.54	
AITC	Tanmay Ghosh	80,477	38.79	
CPI(ML)L	Titas Gupta	5,385	2.6	
INC	Ujjal Chandra	3,646	1.76	
Independent	Sukla Bandyopadhyay	1,776	0.86	
AJUP	Guljar Bayen	1,668	0.80	
SUCI(C)	Shashibhusan Banerjee	1,264	0.61	
NOTA	None of the above	2,180	1.05	
Majority		30,605	14.75	
Turnout		207,478		
BJP hold		Swing		

=== 2021 ===
2021 West Bengal Legislative Assembly election: Bishnupur
Party	Candidate	Votes	%	±%
BJP	Tanmay Ghosh (Note: Tanmay Ghosh was elected as BJP MLA. However, on 30 August 2021 he defected to the Trinamool Congress.)	89,689	46.84	▲40.35
AITC	Archita Bid	78,269	40.88	▼2.83
INC	Debu Chatterjee	15,814	8.26	▼35.96
NOTA	None of the Above	3,419	1.79	▼0.13
Majority		11,420	5.96	▲5.45
Turnout		1,91,469	87.32	▼1.38
BJP gain from INC		Swing		

=== 2016 ===
2016 West Bengal Legislative Assembly election: Bishnupur
Party	Candidate	Votes	%	±%
INC	Tushar Kanti Bhattacharya (Note: Tushar Kanti Bhattacharya was elected as INC MLA. However, he later defected to the Trinamool Congress.)	76,641	44.22	New
AITC	Shyama Prasad Mukherjee	75,750	43.71	▼6.59
BJP	Nanda Dulal Banerjee	11,254	6.49	▲3.11
NOTA	None of the Above	3,336	1.92	
Majority		891	0.51	▼5.88
Turnout		1,73,305	88.70	▼1.68
INC gain from AITC		Swing		

=== 2011 ===
2011 West Bengal state assembly election: Bishnupur
Party	Candidate	Votes	%	±%
AITC	Shyama Prasad Mukherjee	77,662	50.30	
CPI(M)	Swapan Ghosh	67,805	43.91	
BJP	Pankaj Dhar	5,223	3.38	
JDP	Purna Chandra Murmu	3,716	2.41	
Majority		9,857	6.39	
Turnout		154,406	90.38	
AITC gain from CPI(M)		Swing		

=== 1977-2006 ===
In the 2006 state assembly elections, Swapan Ghosh of CPI(M) won the Bishnupur seat defeating his nearest rival Subhasis Batabayal of Trinamool Congress. Contests in most years were multi cornered but only winners and runners are being mentioned. Jayanta Chowdhury of CPI(M) defeated Subhasis Batabayal of Trinamool Congress in 2001 and Buddhadeb Mukherjee of Congress in 1996. Achintya Krishna Ray of CPI(M) defeated Subhasis Batabayal of Congress in 1991, Shyama Prasad Mukherjee of Congress in 1987, Sabyasachi Roy of Congress in 1982 and Ardhendu Mitra of Congress in 1977.

=== 1952-1972 ===
Bhabataran Chakravarty of Congress won in 1972 and 1971. Sasthidas Sarkar of Bangla Congress won in 1969. B.C.Mandal of Congress won in 1967. Radhika Dhibar of CPI won in 1962. In 1957 and 1952 the Bishnupur seat was a dual one. Purabi Mukhopadhyay and Kiran Chandra Digar, both of Congress, won in 1957. Kiran Chandra Digar and Radha Gobinda Roy, both of Congress, won in independent India's first election in 1952.
