= Bishnupur (West Bengal) =

City and municipality in West Bengal, India

Bishnupur বিষ্ণুপুর The City of Temples
- City
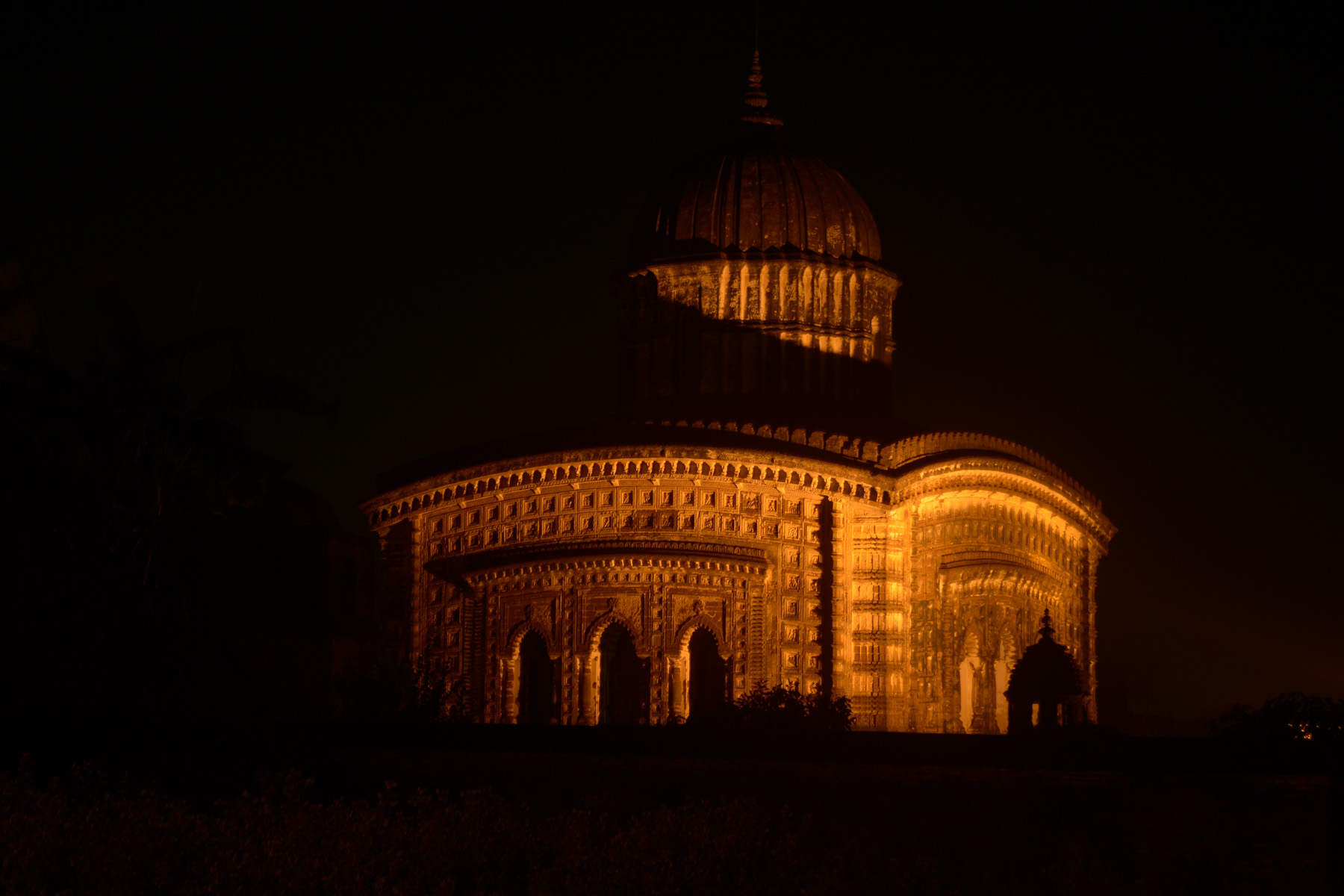
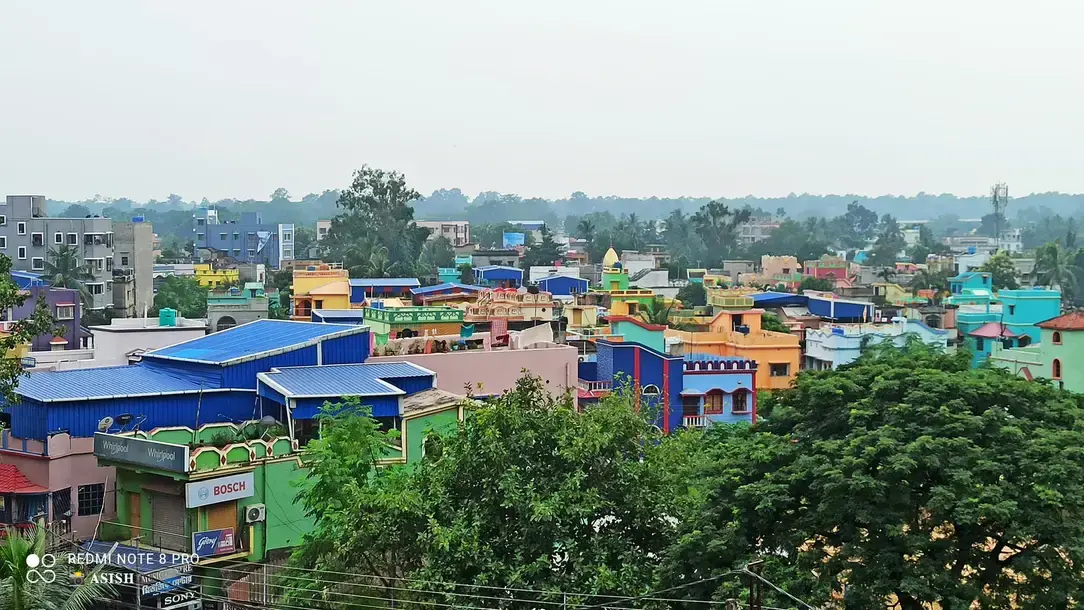
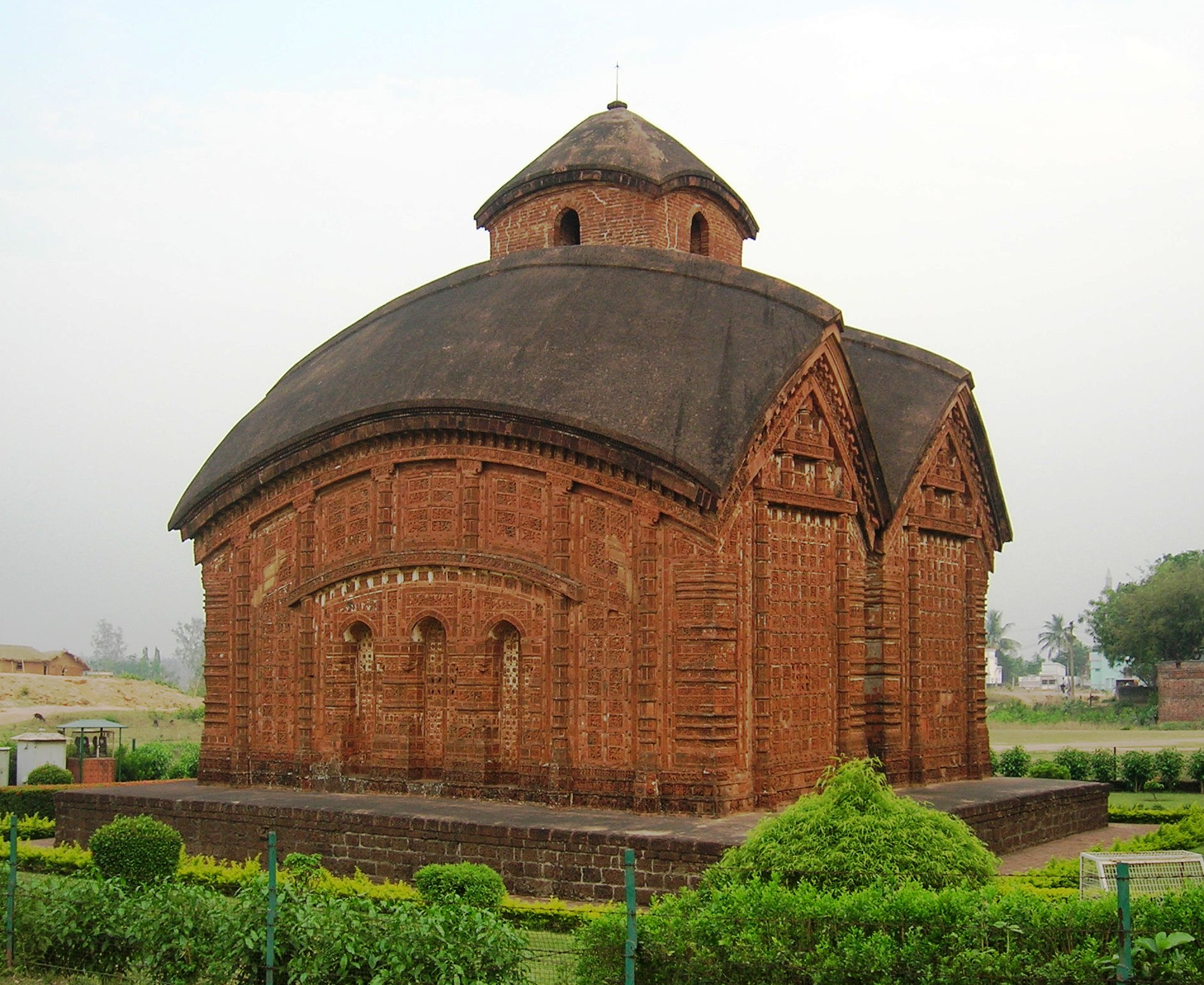
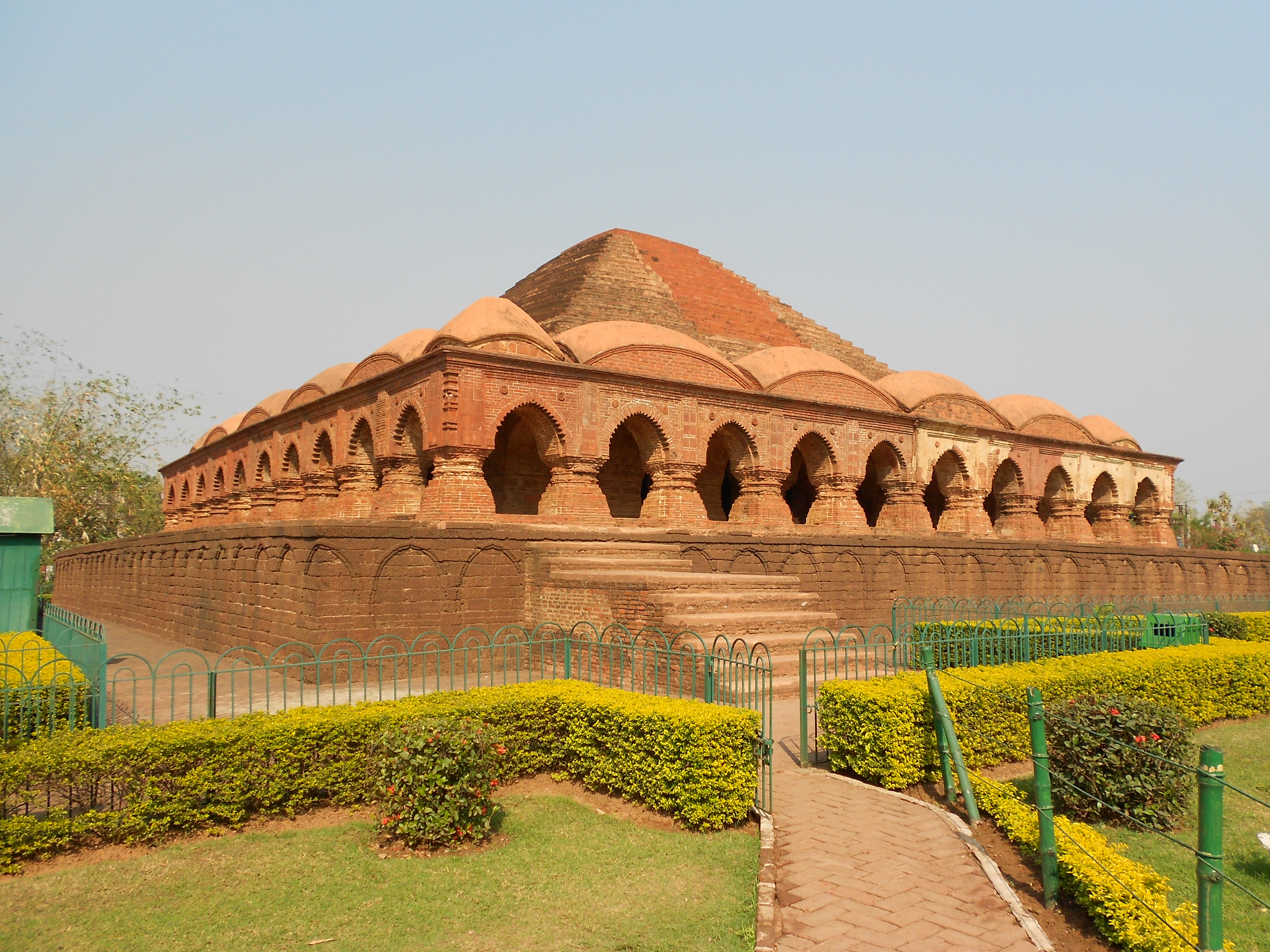
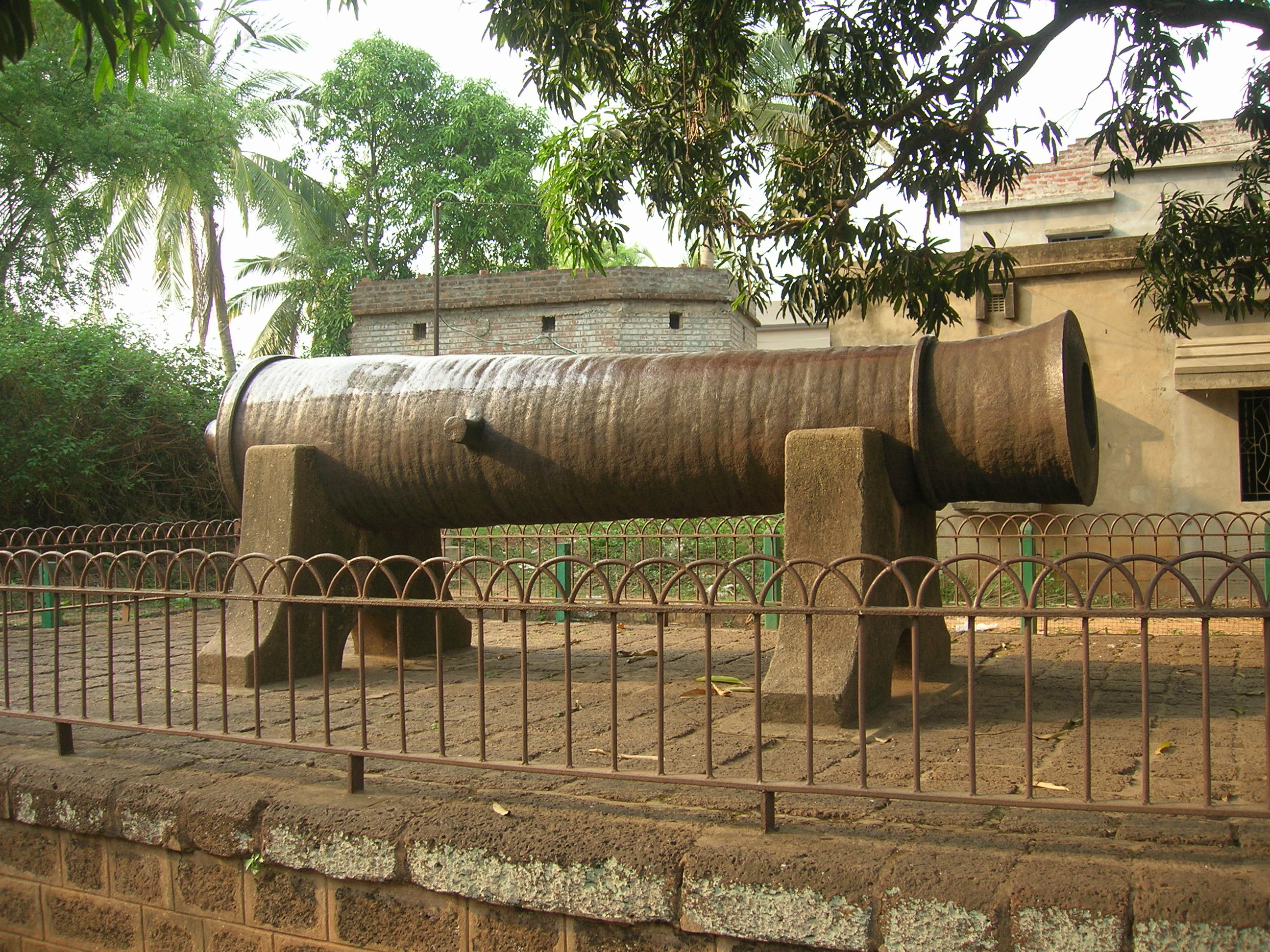
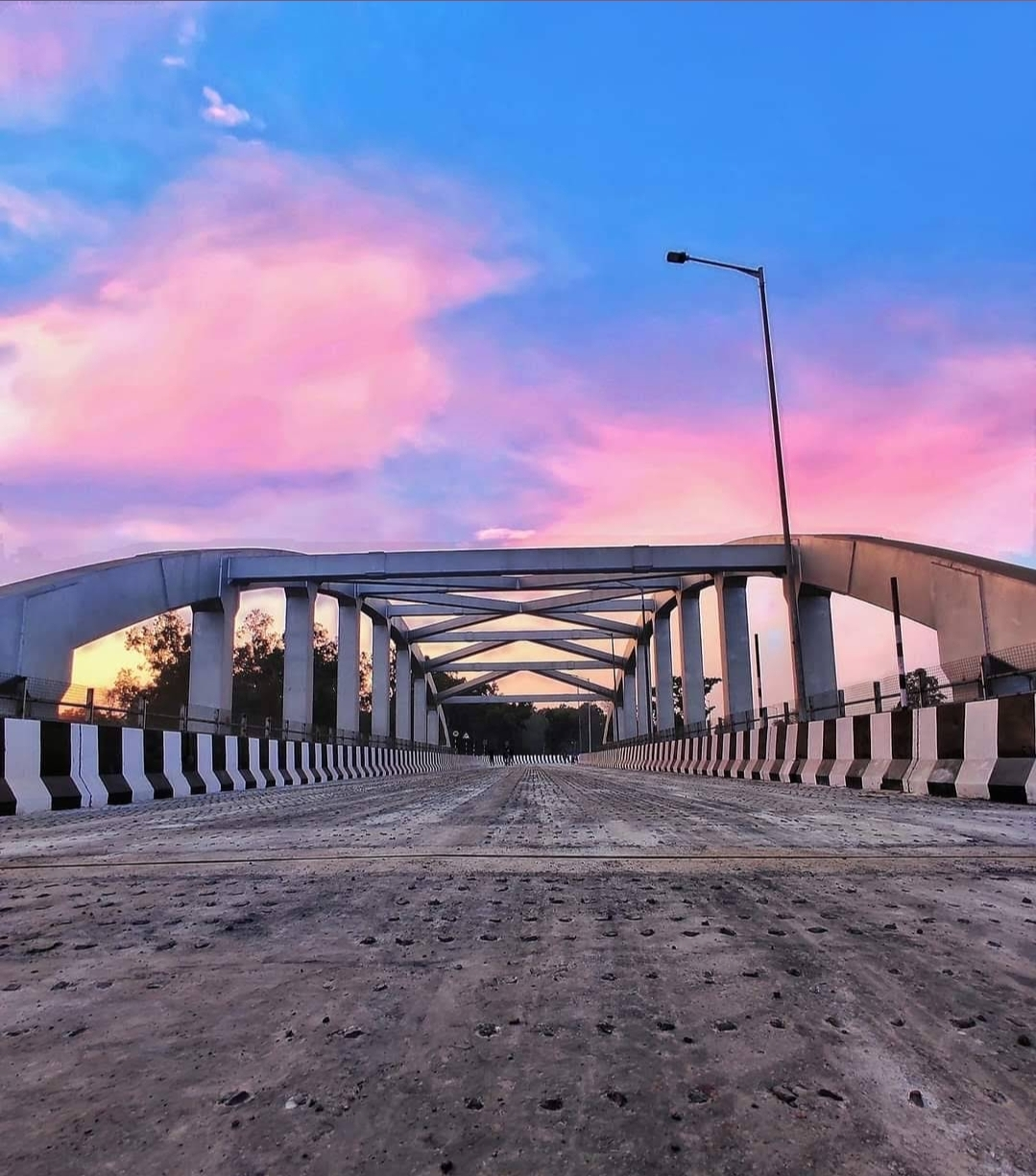
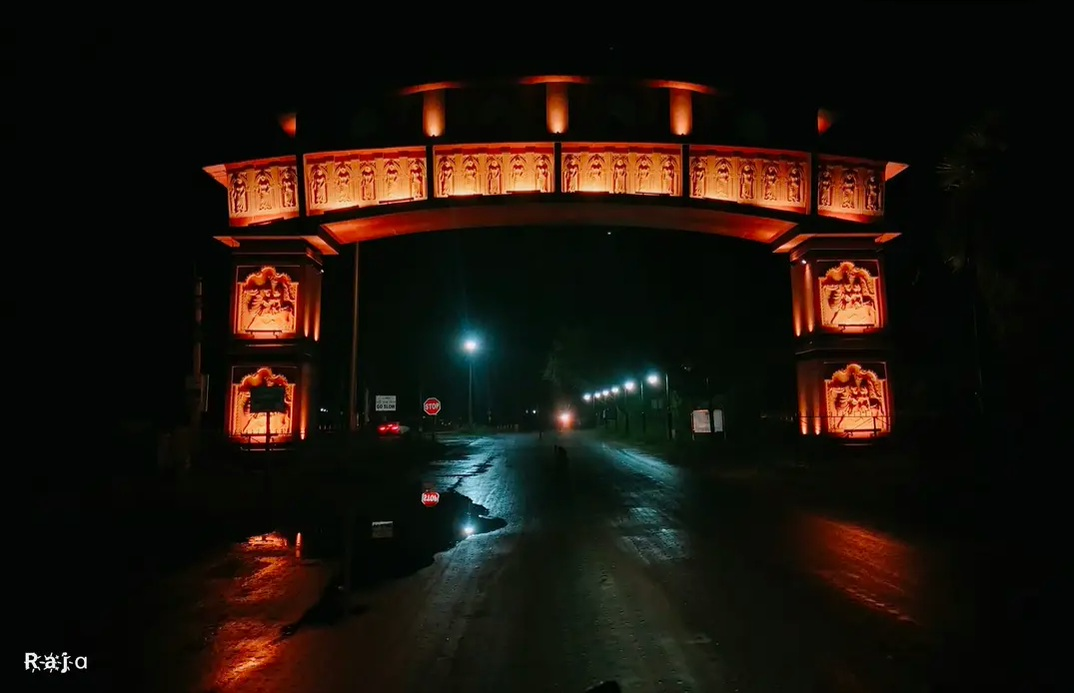
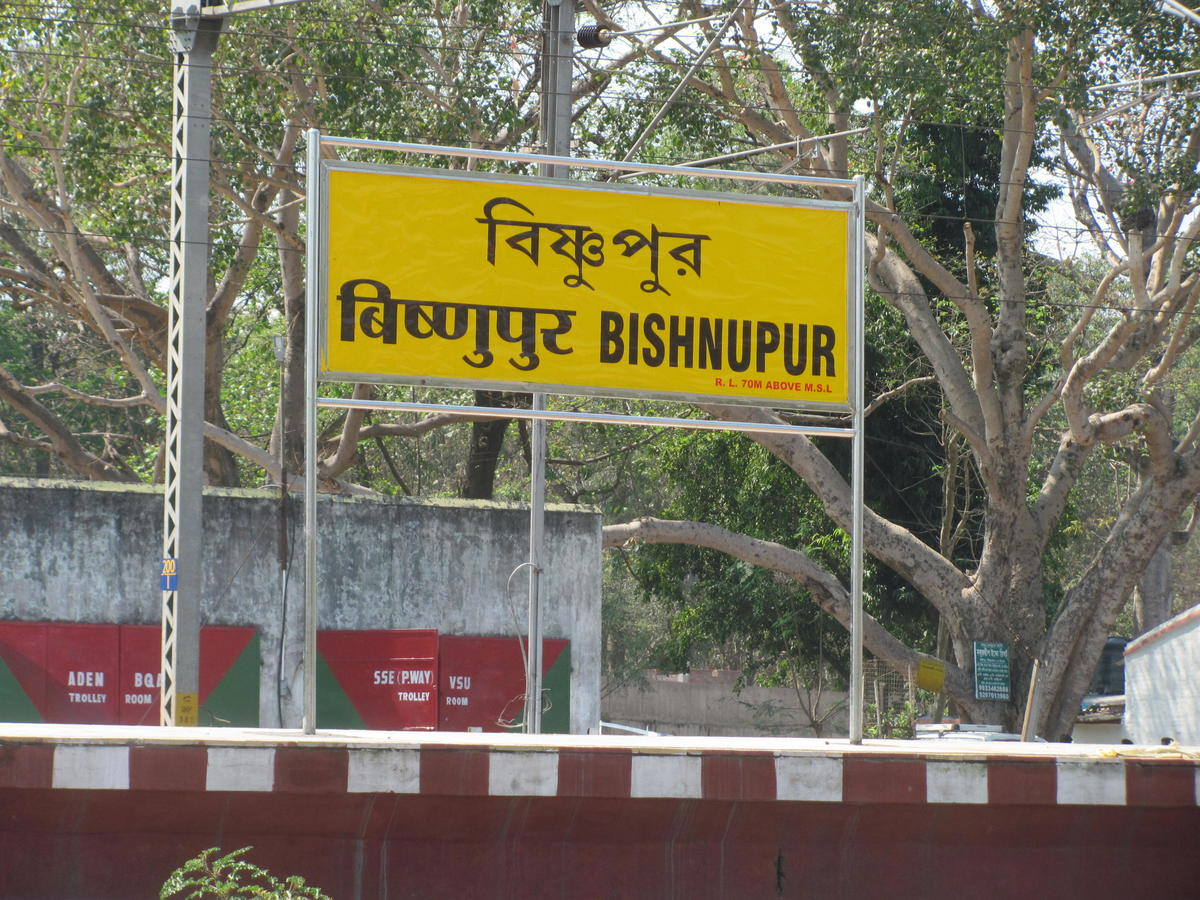
- Radha Shyam Temple Bishnupur Town Jor Bangla Temple Rasmancha Dalmadal Cannon Maharaj Bir Hambir Flyover Bishnupur Gate Bishnupur Railway Station
- Nickname: City of Temples
- Location in West Bengal, India Bishnupur (India)
- Coordinates: 23.075°N 87.317°E
- Country: India
- State: West Bengal
- District: Bankura
- Foundation of Bishnupur: est. 997 A.D.
- Founder: Jagat Malla
- Named for: God Vishnu

Government
  - Type: Municipality
  - Body: Bishnupur Municipality

Area
  - Total: 22 km^{2} (8.5 sq mi)
- Elevation: 70 m (230 ft)

Population (2011)
  - Total: 75,000
  - Density: 3,400/km^{2} (8,800/sq mi)
- Demonym(s): Bishnupurbashi, Bishnupurians

Languages
  - Official: Bengali, English
- Time zone: UTC+5:30 (IST)
- PIN: 722122
- Telephone code: +91 3244
- ISO 3166 code: IN-WB
- Vehicle registration: WB-88
- Lok Sabha constituency: Bishnupur
- Vidhan Sabha constituency: Bishnupur
- Website: bishnupurmunicipality.com, bankura.gov.in/tourist-place/bishnupur/

Bishnupur (/bɪʃnʊˌpʊər/; Bengali: [biʃnupur]; alternatively spelled as Vishnupur) is a city and a municipality in Bankura district, West Bengal, India. It has terracotta temples built by the Malla rulers, historic Radha Krishna temples built during 1600–1800 CE and the Baluchari sarees. In 1997 the Temples of Bishnupur were placed on the UNESCO World Heritage Site's Tentative list.

== History ==
Under the Gupta period, Bishnupur was ruled by local Hindu kings who paid tribute to Samudra Gupta. Following a long period of obscurity, where the land oscillated between being a minor independent principality and a vassal state. The land is also called Mallabhum after the Malla rulers of this place. The Malla rulers were Vaishnavites and built the famous terracotta temples during the 17th and 18th centuries at this place. The legends of Bipodtarini Devi are associated with the Malla Kings of Bishnupur.

For almost a thousand years it was the capital of the Malla kings of Mallabhum, of which Bankura was a part, till their power waned during the times when the Mughal Empire weakened under the last monarchs of the dynasty.

The patronage of Malla king Veer Hambir and his successors Raja Raghunath Singha Dev and Bir Singha Dev made Bishnupur one of the principal centres of culture in Bengal. Most of the terracotta temples, for which the town is known, were built during this period.

Mrinmoyee temple of kings is treated as a valuable historic place.

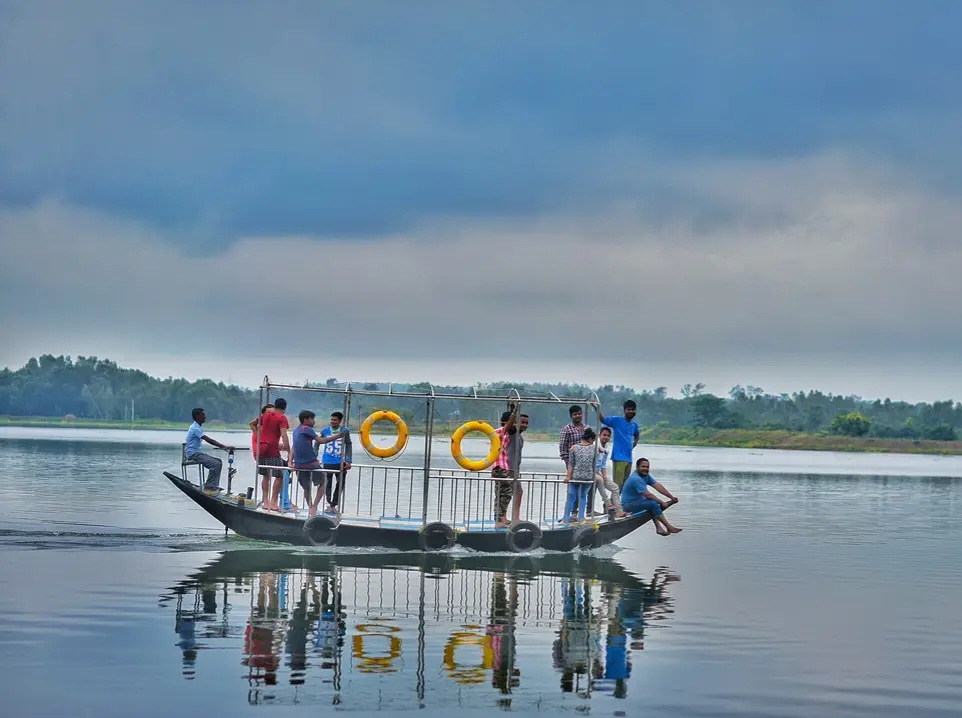
Recreational boat on Lalbandh, Bishnupur

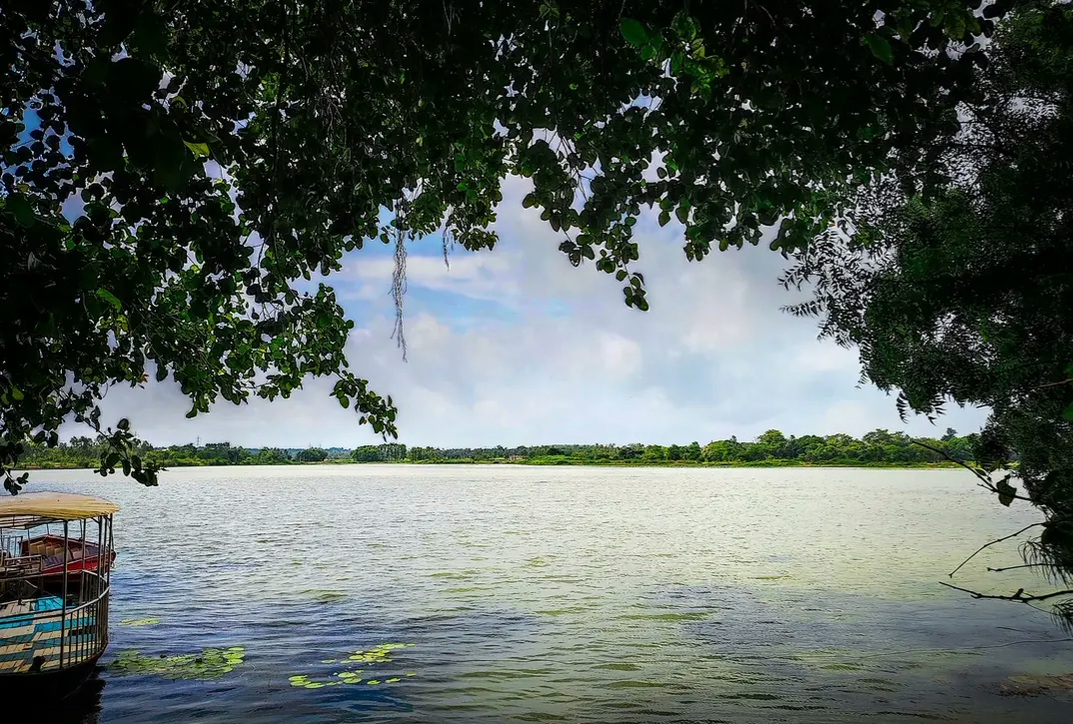
Lalbandh in a summer evening

Royal patronage also gave rise to Bishnupur Gharana (school) of Hindustani classical music in late 18th-century and the Bishnupur school of painting.

== Geography ==
Places in Bishnupur subdivision of Bankura district in West Bengal
M: Municipal town, And District Town CT: census town, R: rural/ urban centre, T: ancient/ temple centre
Owing to space constraints in the small map, the actual locations in a larger map may vary slightly

Bishnupur is located at 23°05′N 87°19′E. It has an average elevation of 59 metres (194 feet).

This area has fertile, low -lying alluvial plains. It is a predominantly rural area with 90.06% of the population living in rural areas and only 8.94% living in the urban areas. It was a part of the core area of Mallabhum.

== Demographics ==
As of 2001 India census, Bishnupur had a population of 61,943. Males constitute 50% of the population and females 50%. Bishnupur has an average literacy rate of 69%, higher than the national average of 59.5%; with male literacy of 77% and female literacy of 61%. 11% of the population is under 6 years of age.

== Civic administration ==
Bishnupur Municipality

=== CD block HQ ===
The headquarters of Bishnupur CD block are located at Bishnupur.

=== Police station ===
Bishnupur police station has jurisdiction over Bishnupur municipality and Bishnupur CD Block. The area covered is 365.73 km^{2} with a population of 138,786.

== Notable persons ==
- Charan Kobi Baidyanath, poet and social activist.
- Maniklal Sinha (1916–1994) was an archaeologist, writer, founder of Acharya Jogesh Chandra Pura Kirti Bhavan (museum) and Bangiya Sahitya Parishat, Bishnupur Branch.
- Amitava Pal artist of the revival of old style Baluchari Saree.

== Language ==
At the time of the 2011 census, 99.18% of the population of Bisnupur I community development block spoke Bengali, 0.79% Hindi and 0.02% Urdu as their first language.

== Education ==
There are a number of well-known schools and colleges in Bishnupur. For higher education, there is a college named Ramananda College under Bankura University. There is also a music college named Ramsharan College of Music. The names of the schools are:

- Bishnupur Heritage School-CBSE
- Bishnupur High School (Bankura)
- Bishnupur Mahakuma Madhyamik Vidyalaya
- Bishnupur Krittibas Mukherjee High School.
- Sibdas Central Girls' High School.
- Bishnupur Parimal Debi Girls' High School.
- Kusumbani Jamundas Khemka High School.
- Bishnupur Mission High School.
- Nikhil Banga Sikshan Mahavidyalaya, Govt. B.Ed and B.P.Ed College
- Bishnupur Public School-High, a co-educational, English-medium (recognised by West Bengal Board of Secondary Education)
- Bishnupur Public Primary Teachers' Training Institute, A D.El.Ed. College
- Bishnupur Public Institute of Education, A D.El.Ed. College
- Bishnupur Public-Private I.T.I., An Industrial Training Institute (Affiliated to DGE&T / N.C.V.T. Govt. of India)
- Bishnupur Public Institute of Engineering
- K.G. Engineering Institute(KGEI) is a government polytechnic college; there are also Mallabhum Institute of Technology (MIT) is a private b.tech college affiliated to MAKAUT University and two private polytechnic colleges named Mallabhum Institute of Polytechnic (MIP).

== Healthcare ==
Bishnupur has a 250-bedded District hospital and One Superspeciality Hospital with ICU Dep. at Rasikganja. There are two private hospitals providing services 24×7 and there are many private nursing homes.

== Culture ==
=== Bishnupur Mela ===
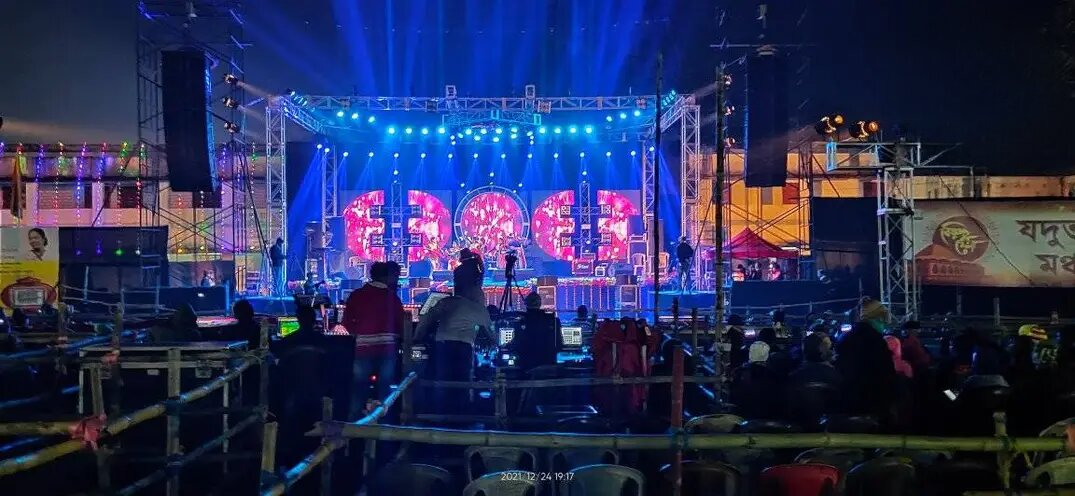
Bishnupur Mela Jadubhatta Mancha

Bishnupur Mela is an annual fair of handicraft and cultural richness of region being held in Bishnupur since 1988.The mela is organised from 23-27 December at the High school ground, adjacent to the Rasmancha and the K.G. Engineering Institute Main ground and is organized by the Bishnupur Mela Committee in association with the district administration. Suchitra Mitra, Bhupen Hazarika, Amjad Ali Khan, Ajoy Chakrabarty, Aashish Khan, Bappi Lahiri, Amit Kumar, Kumar Sanu, Anuradha Paudwal, Anupam Roy, Rupankar Bagchi, Mukunda Das, Anup Ghoshal, Haimanti Sukla, Nachiketa Chakraborty, Lopamudra Mitra and Iman Chakraborty have performed at the Bishnupur Mela. Classical dance artistes Sanjukta Panigrahi, Bihu of Asam, Manipuri dance have also performed in this mela. Shrutinatak by Partha Ghosh-Gouri Ghosh spoke.

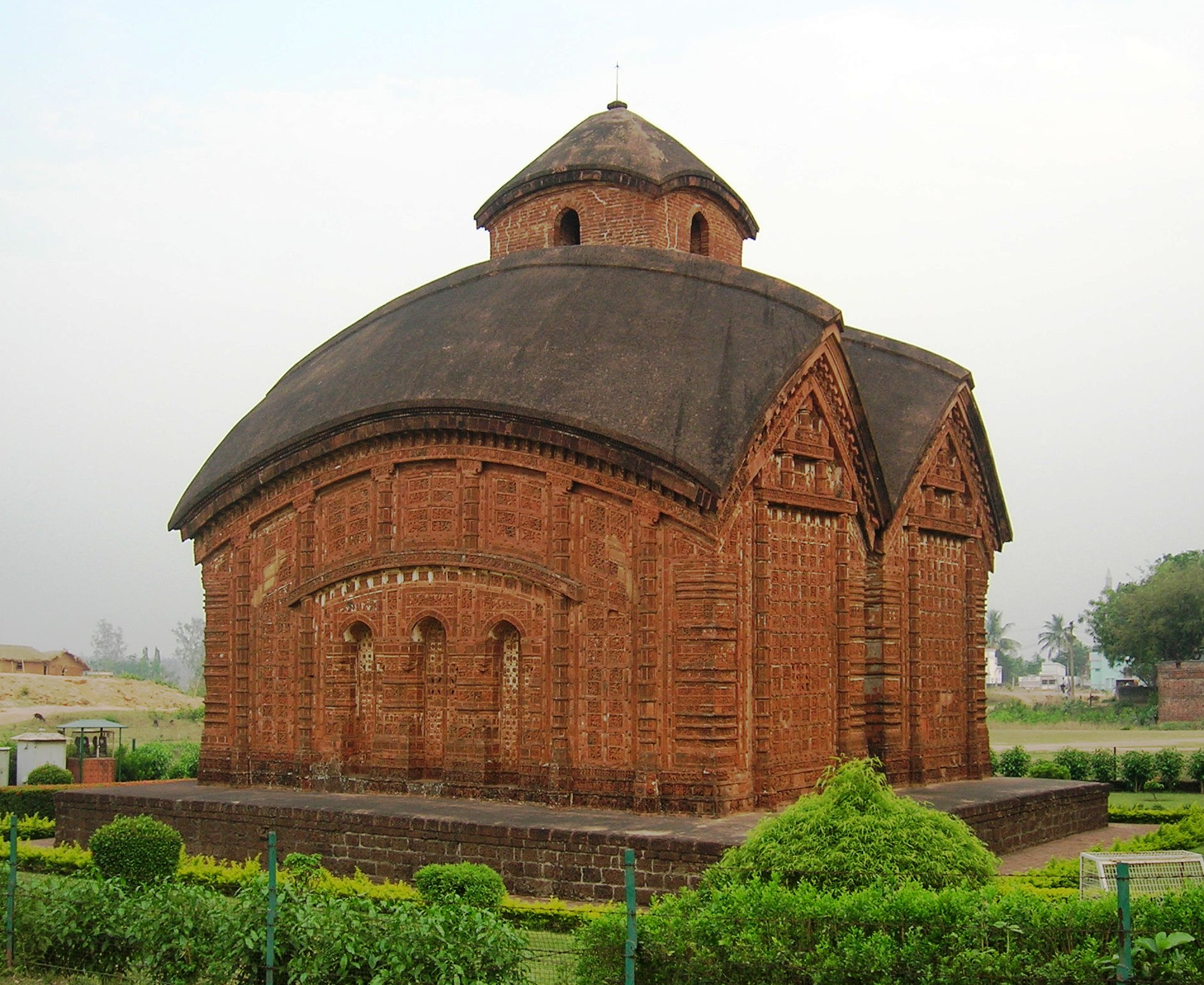
Jor Bangla Temple of 16 century in Bankura

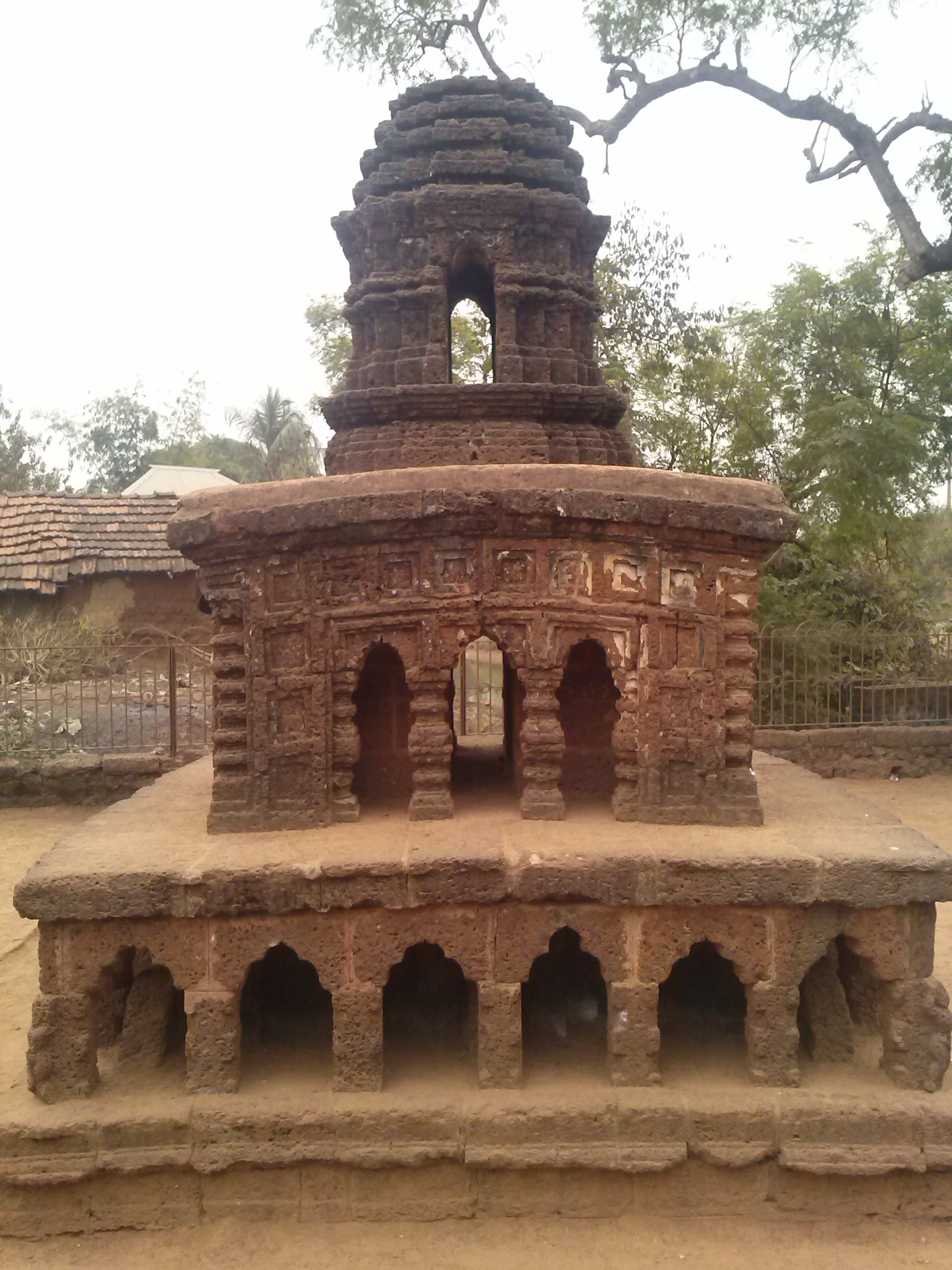
Stone chariot of Bankura

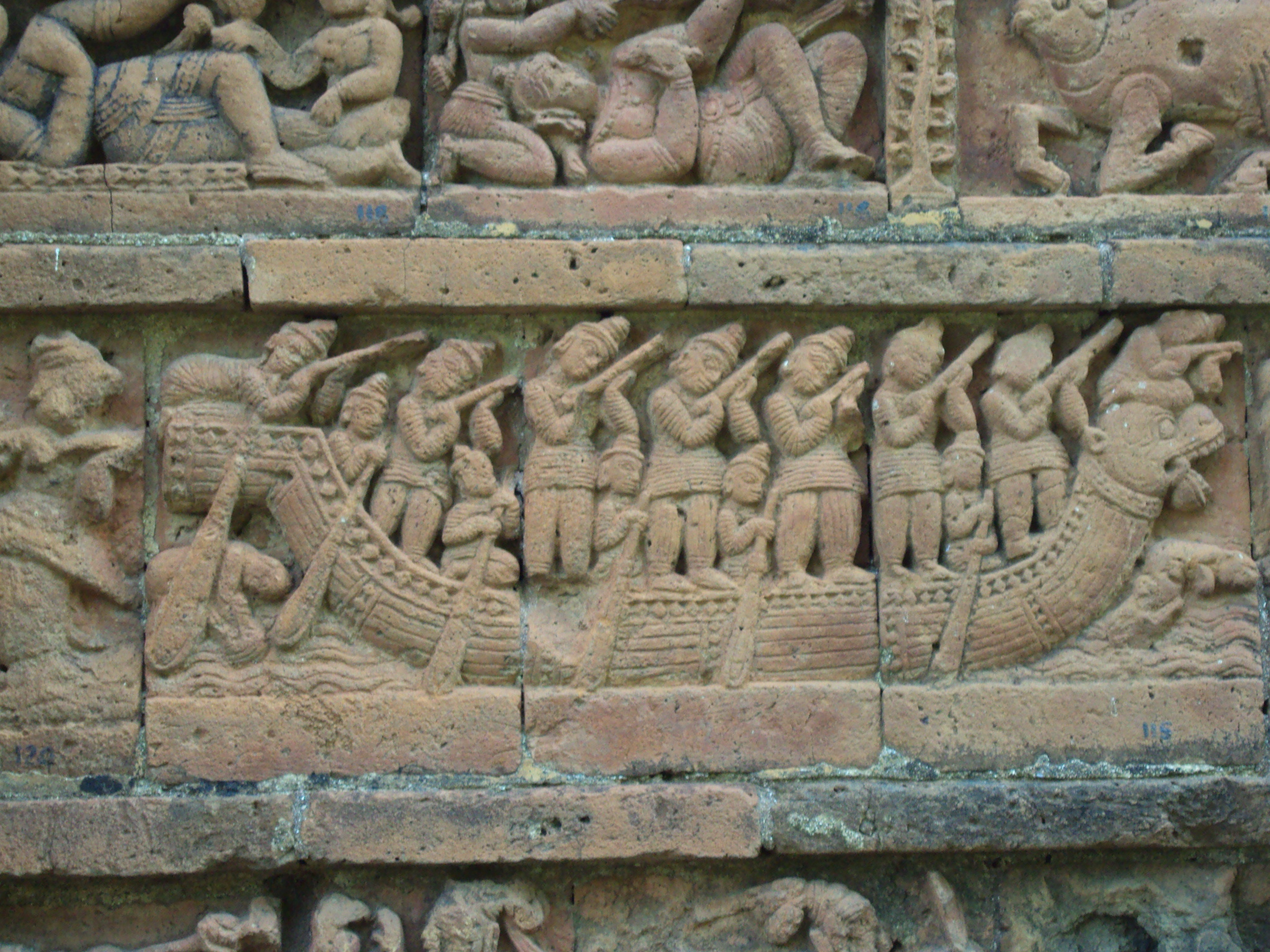
Terracotta relief in temple of Bankura

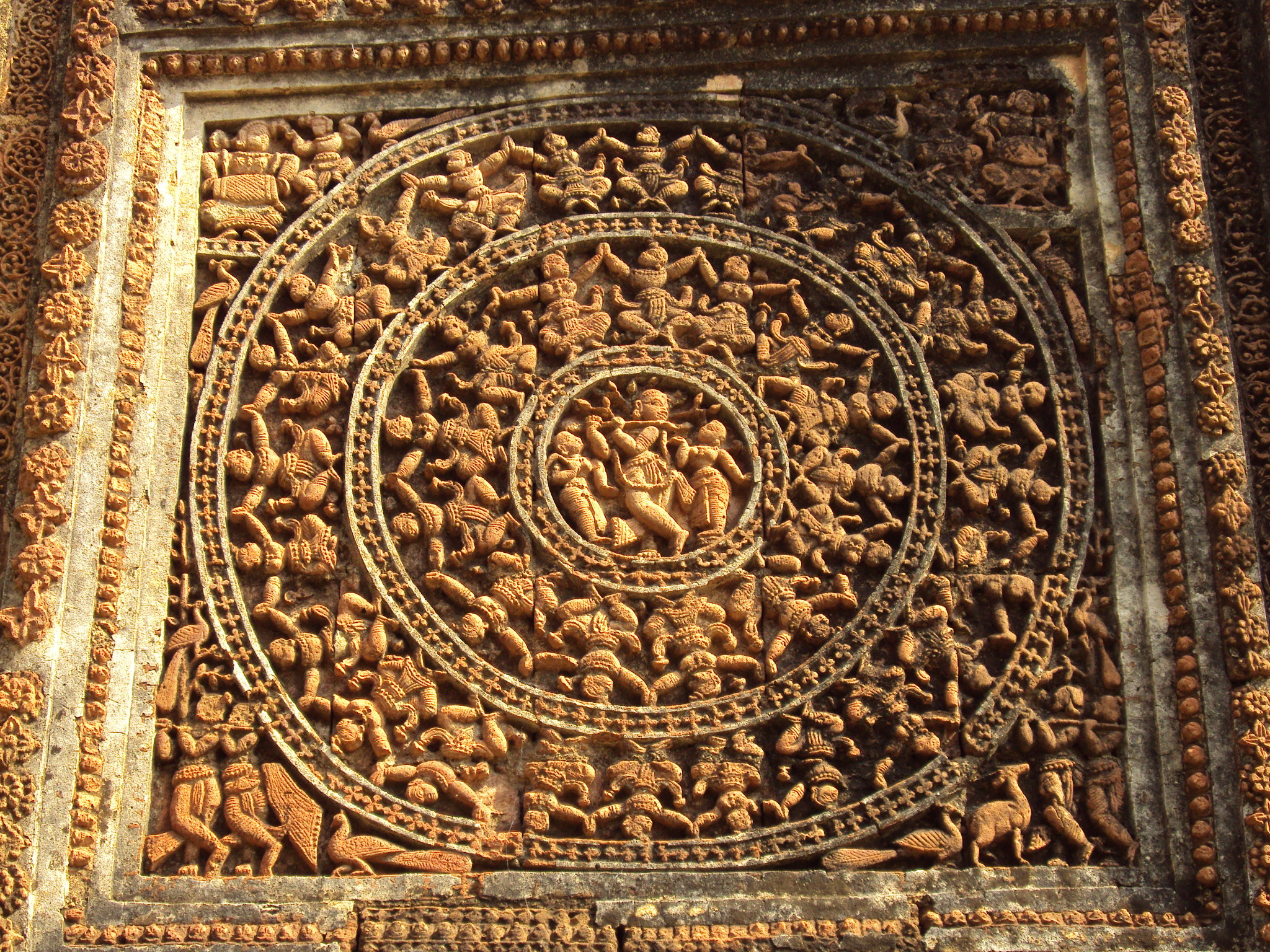
Terracotta motif

In 2018, the Bishnupur Mela was temporarily shifted partly to the temple complex of Bishnupur. The idea was to have Bishnupur Terracotta Temples at the backdrop of the main stage. Later on the Bishnupur fair shifted back to the previous place. The Bishnupur Mela was inaugurated with the Gharana Music sung.

=== Temples and other places ===
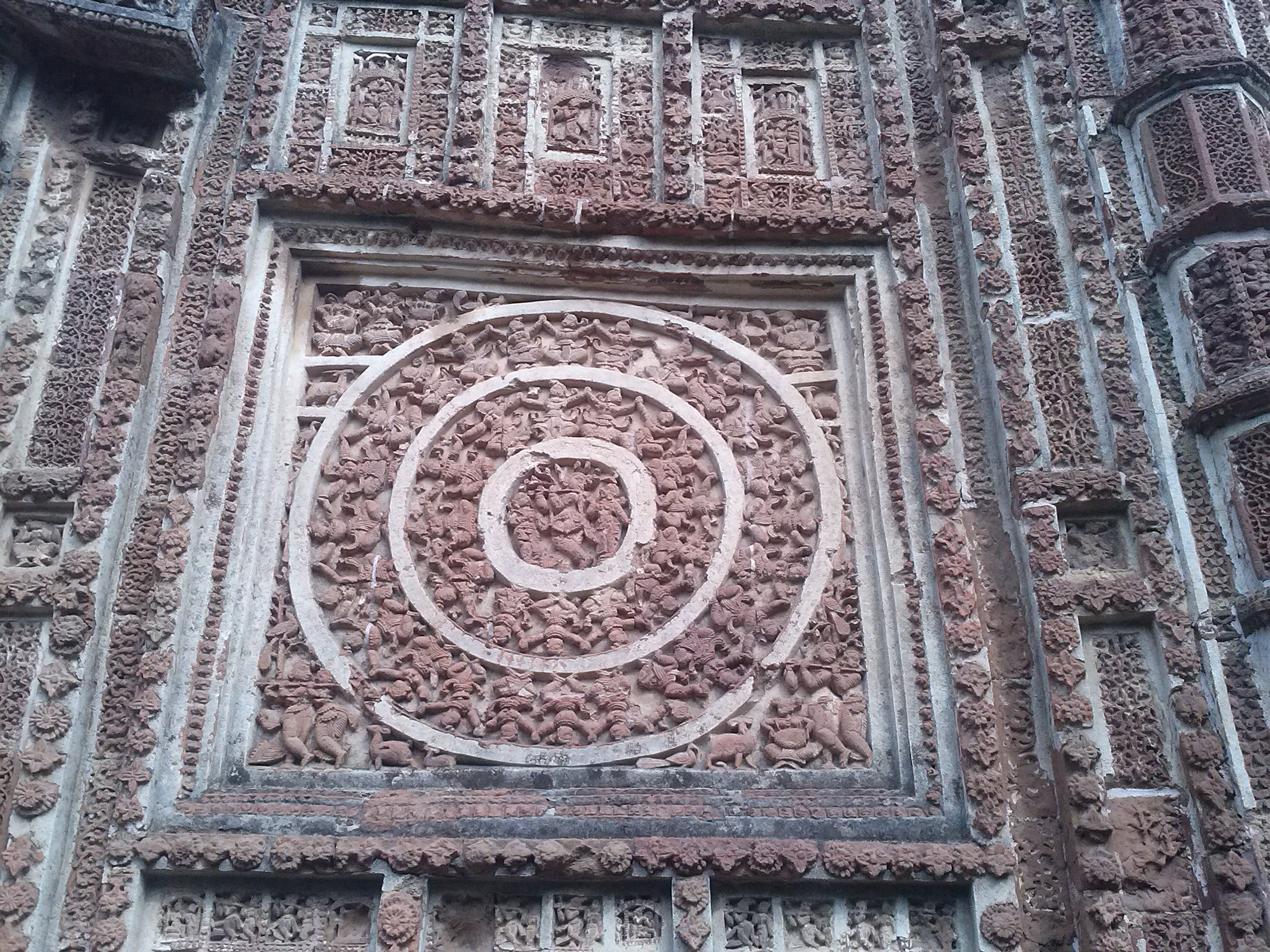
The Raschakra of the Syamaraya temple or Pancharatna Temple, established in 1643.

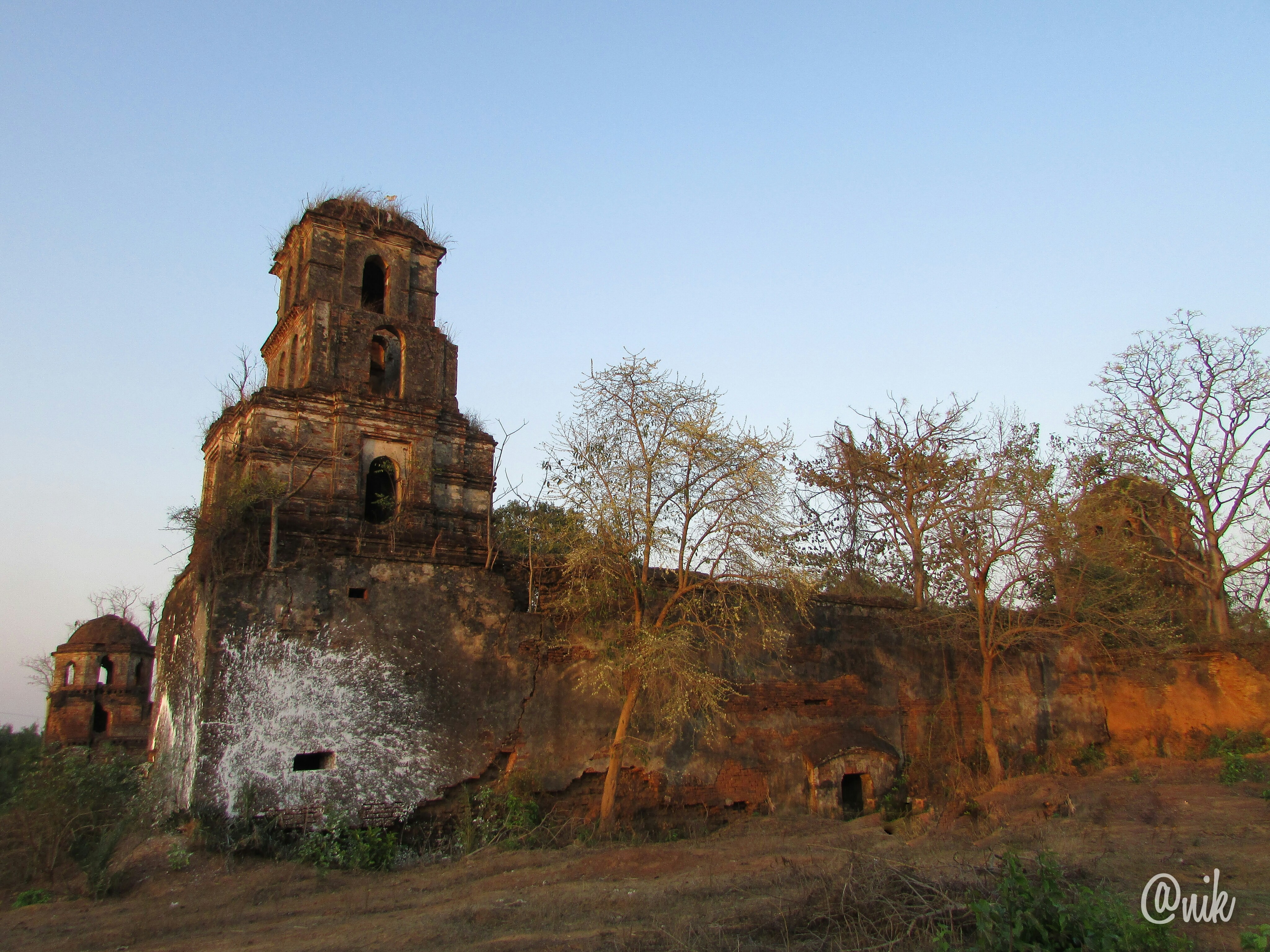
Hawa mahal

The temples were crafted from the local laterite and brick, and covered with terracotta tiles depicting scenes from the epic Mahabharata. The temples are located in Bishnupur and across many other small villages in the Bankura district.

- Rasmancha (oldest brick temple with an elongated pyramidal tower Surrounded by hut-shaped turrets)
- Pancha Ratna Temple of Shyam Rai
- Jorebangla Temple of Keshta Rai
- Radha Madhab Temple
- Madanmohan Temple
- Dalmadal Kaman
- Lalgarh
- Lalbandh
- Acharya Jogesh Chandra Pura Kirti Bhavan(museum)
- Bangiya Sahitya Parishad - Bishnupur Branch
- Gumgarh
- Pathar Darwaja (main gateway of Bishnupur)
- Garh Darwaja (small gateway of Bishnupur)
- Stone Chariot
- Nutan Mahal
- Bishnupur hawa mahal
- Memorial of Shrinibas Acharya
- Gour-Nitai Temple (Tejpal)
- KeshabRai Temple (Patpur)

=== Music ===
A school of music, called the Bishnupur Gharana, was established here in 1370 A.D and flourished under the patronage of the Malla kings. The school hit its peak in the 16th and 17th centuries. This style of music is rooted in the Dhrupad style and is still being kept alive in local academies of music. Pakhwaj, Sitar, Esraj comprise the main instruments. Bengali Ragpradhan is one of the Classical items of this gharana.

== products ==
Terracotta is characteristic of Bishnupur. Apart from the temples, terracotta pottery, artefacts, and jewellery made from this traditional material are widely produced. Notable items include terracotta horses, elephants, Ganesha, and Nataraj figures. Currently, artisans also create items such as masks, human figurines, wall hangings, and mini-sized replicas of the Dal Madal Kaman (cannon). The potters derive inspiration from the history of local rulers and wars.

== Baluchari Saree ==
Bishnupur is famous for Baluchari Sari. Woven on Jacquard punch-card looms, these sarees often have mythological scenes woven into the border and pallu. Baluchari sarees are woven using richly dyed silk with intricate motifs depicting Indian mythology and folk tales woven onto its large pallu. The motifs are taken mainly from the epics of Ramayana and Mahabharata though a mild change has been brought in to cater to modern tastes.

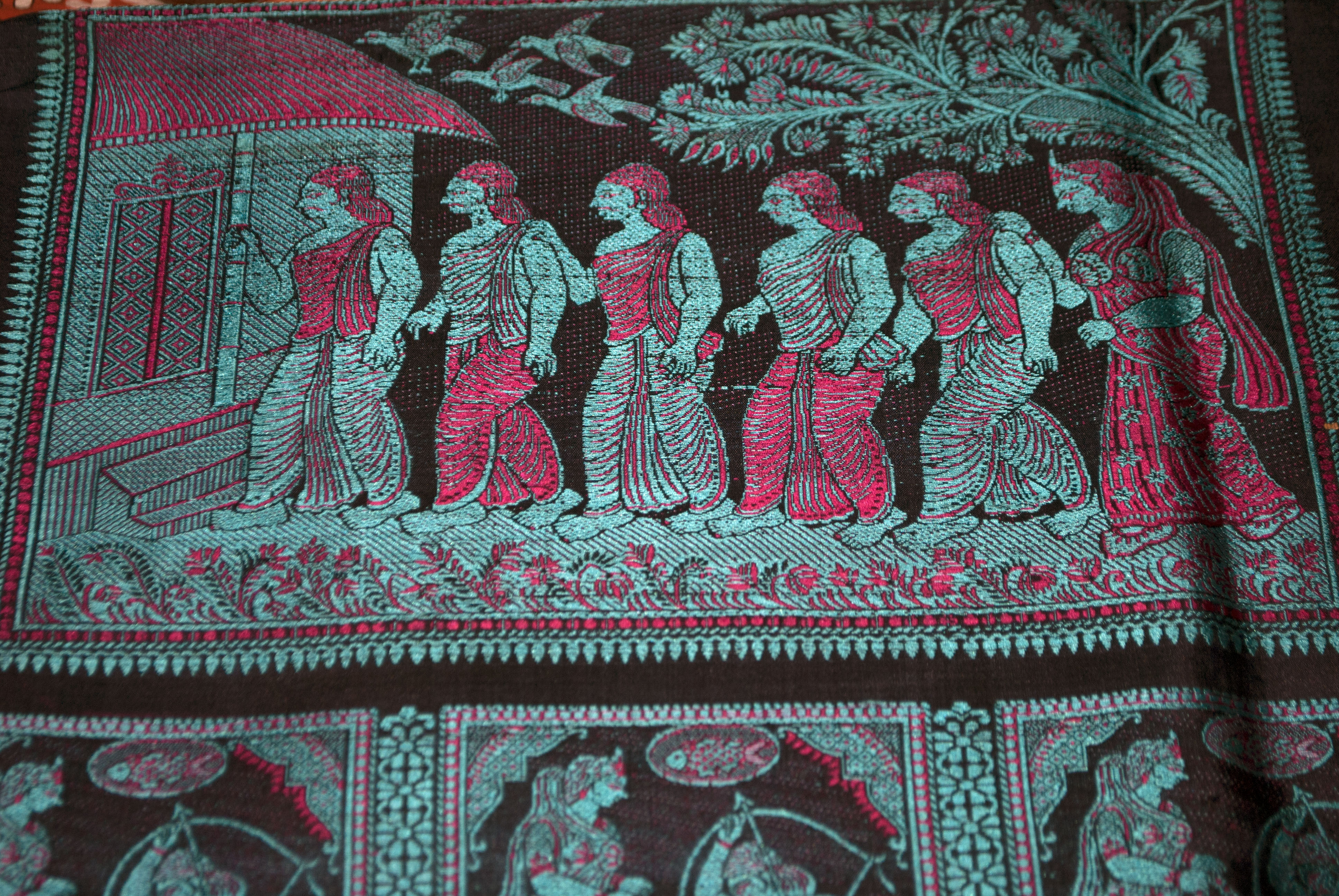
Baluchari saree

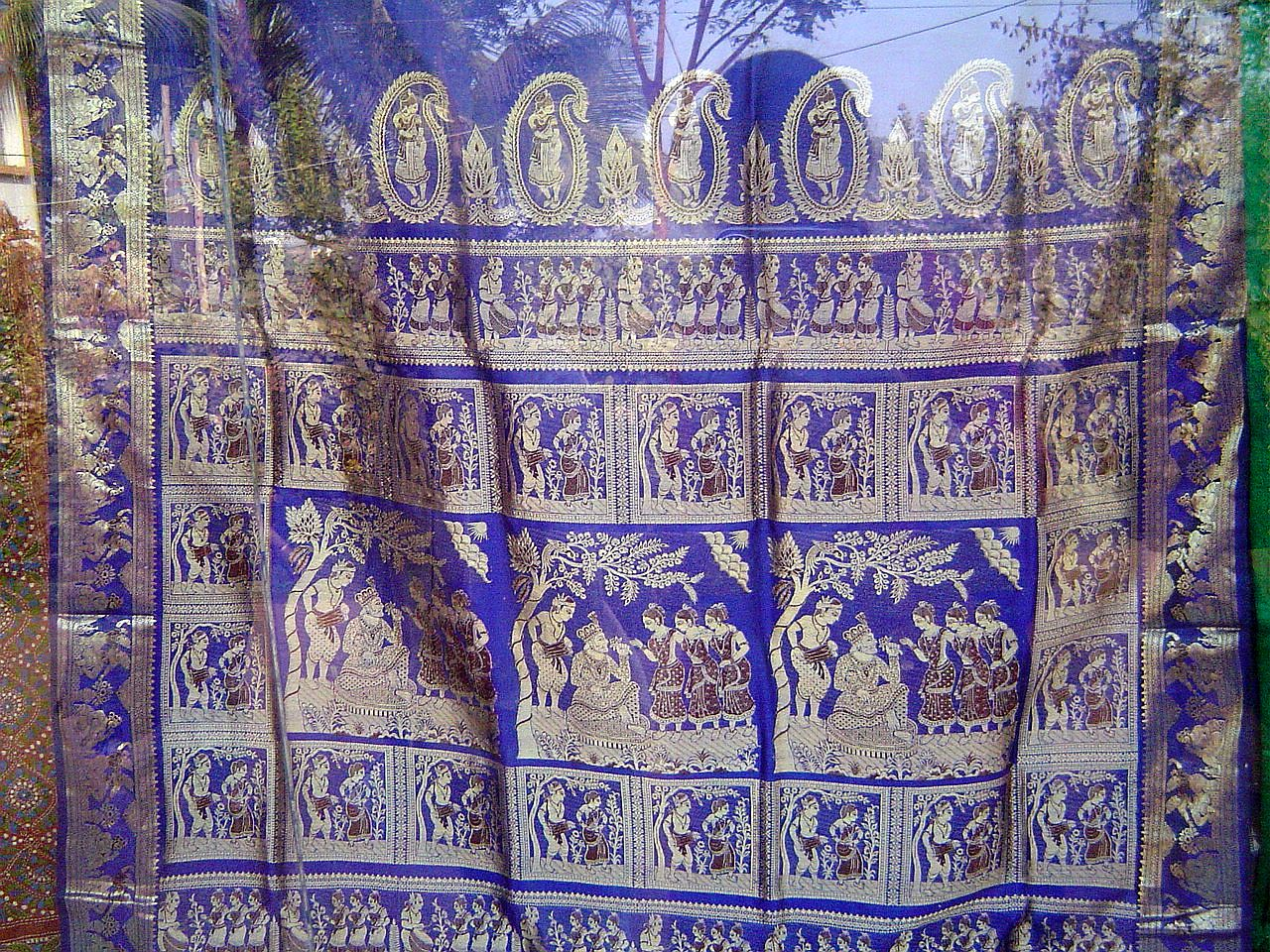

In the year 2018, a fashion show with Baluchari Saree was introduced to promote Baluchari Saree at an international platform. Besides artisans got a huge income by selling crafts from the stalls of Mela. A recent addition is Bishnupur Utsab, held after the Mela. It is a classical music and dance festival in recognition of the 'Bishnupur Gharana' in music. It was stopped after 2012 but It started again on and from 2/2/2018 at Rashmancha.

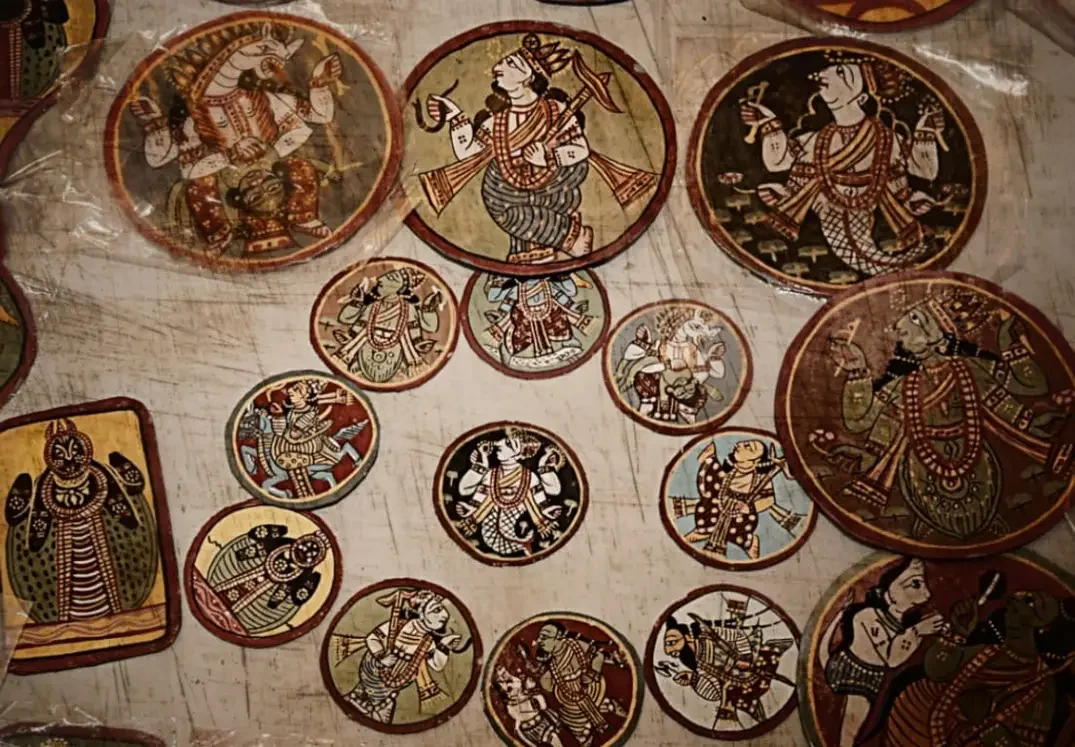
Das Avatar taash Bishnupur

The Dashavatar Tash are a kind of playing cards that depict the ten avatars of the Hindu god Vishnu. They are traditionally round and are hand-painted on a backing made of layers of fabric glued together. They are made only by members of the Foujdar family of Bishnupur.

Brass and bell-metal craft is still practiced in Bishnupur. Previously a unique alloy called 'bharan' was also used in Bishnupur, but it is no longer used.

Lanterns made of recycled materials are another local craft.

=== Terracotta horses ===
Bankura horses are terracotta horses that are used for religious purposes and also as decorative items. This art originated in the Bankura district. These horses are known for their symmetrical shape and rounded curves. The Bankura or Panchmura horse gained popularity among art lovers since it was depicted in paintings by M. F. Husain. Bishnupur Motichoor Laddu has received Geographical Indicator Tag (GI Tag) in the year of 2025.

== Festivals and fairs ==
There is a snake festival in August, Ultorath and the Bishnupur fair in December. Also, durga puja and kali puja or diwali is celebrated with pomp here. The Rajbari Durga Puja (also popular as Mrinmoyee Maa er pujo) was started on 994 AD, which makes it the oldest Durga Puja in the entire Bengal region including today's Bangladesh, Odisha and Tripura.

== Municipality ==
During the period 1990–2010, the 175-year-old Bishnupur Municipality was controlled by INC. From 2010 it is controlled by TMC. Present Municipality chairman is Mr. Gautam Goswami.

== Image gallery ==
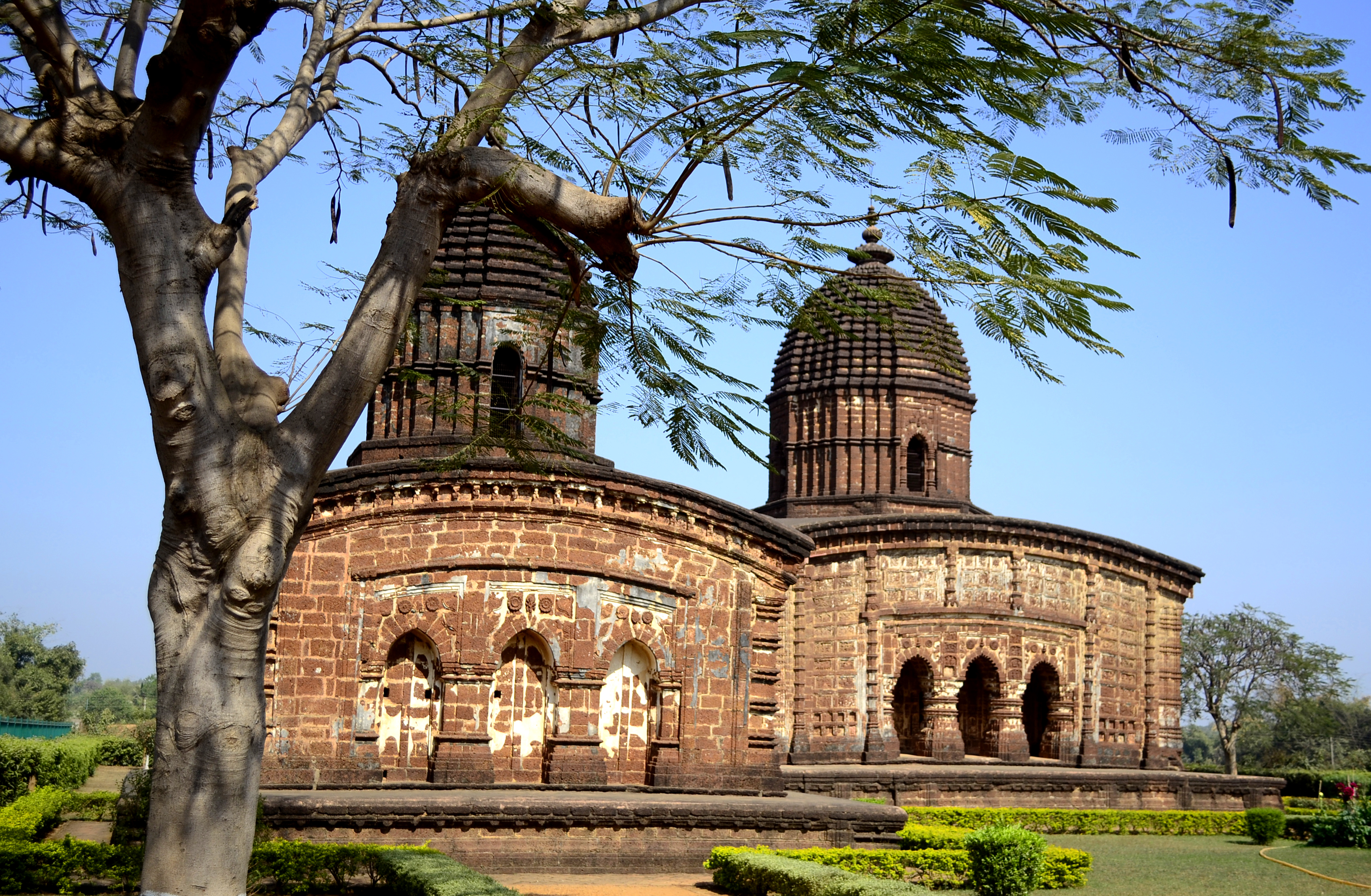
Jor Mandir Complex, Bishnupur

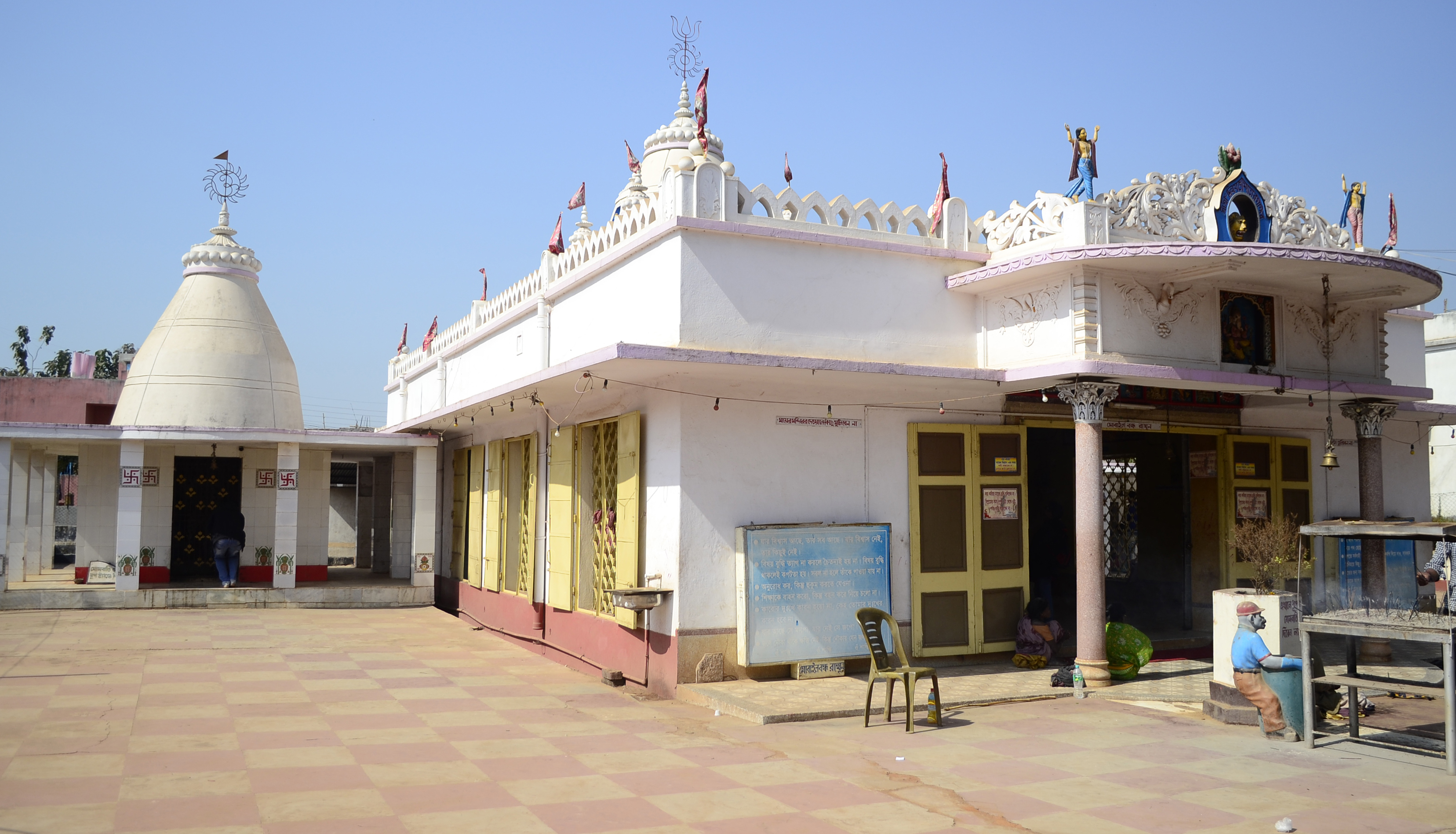
Chinnamasta Temple, Bishnupur

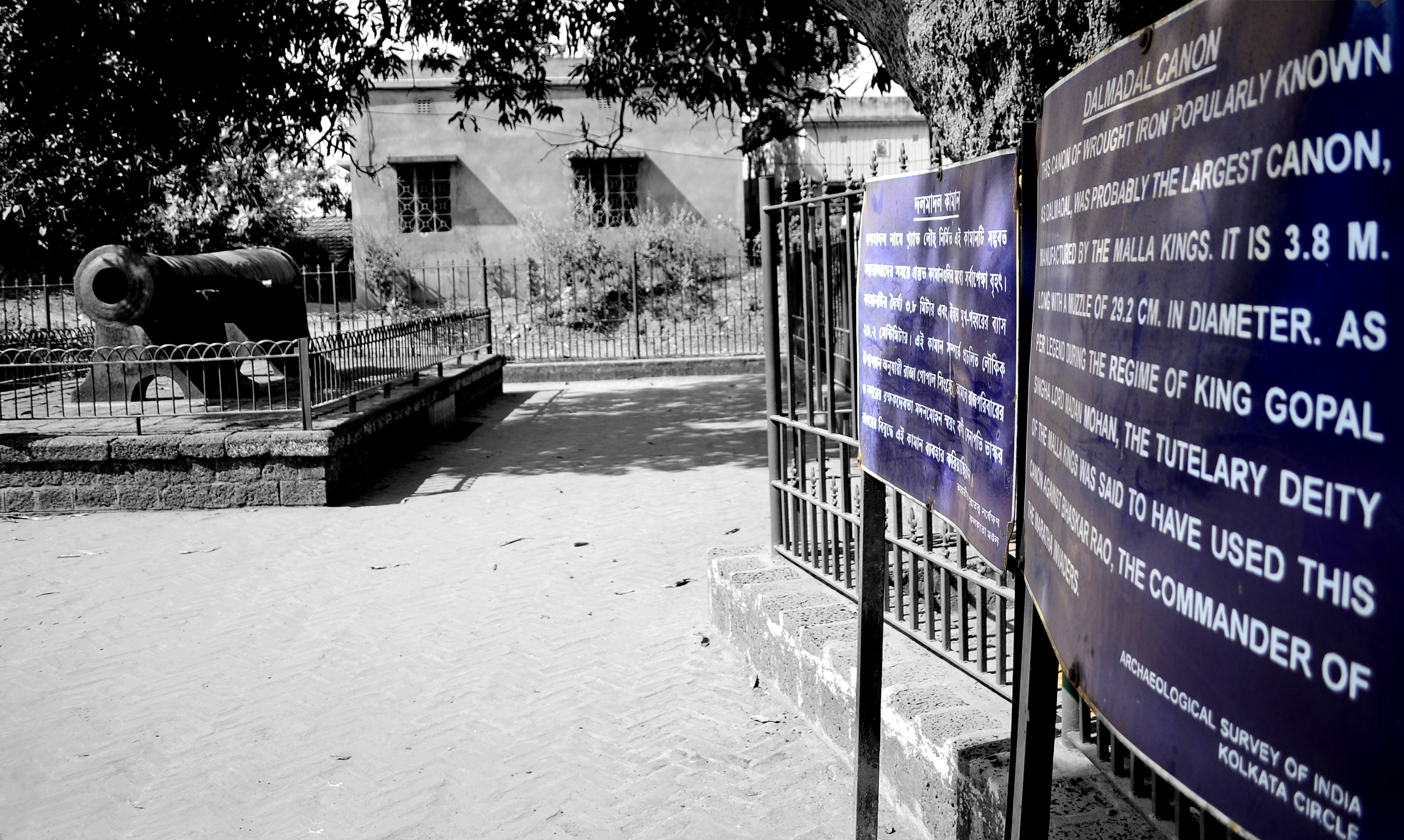
Dalmadal Kaman, Bishnupur

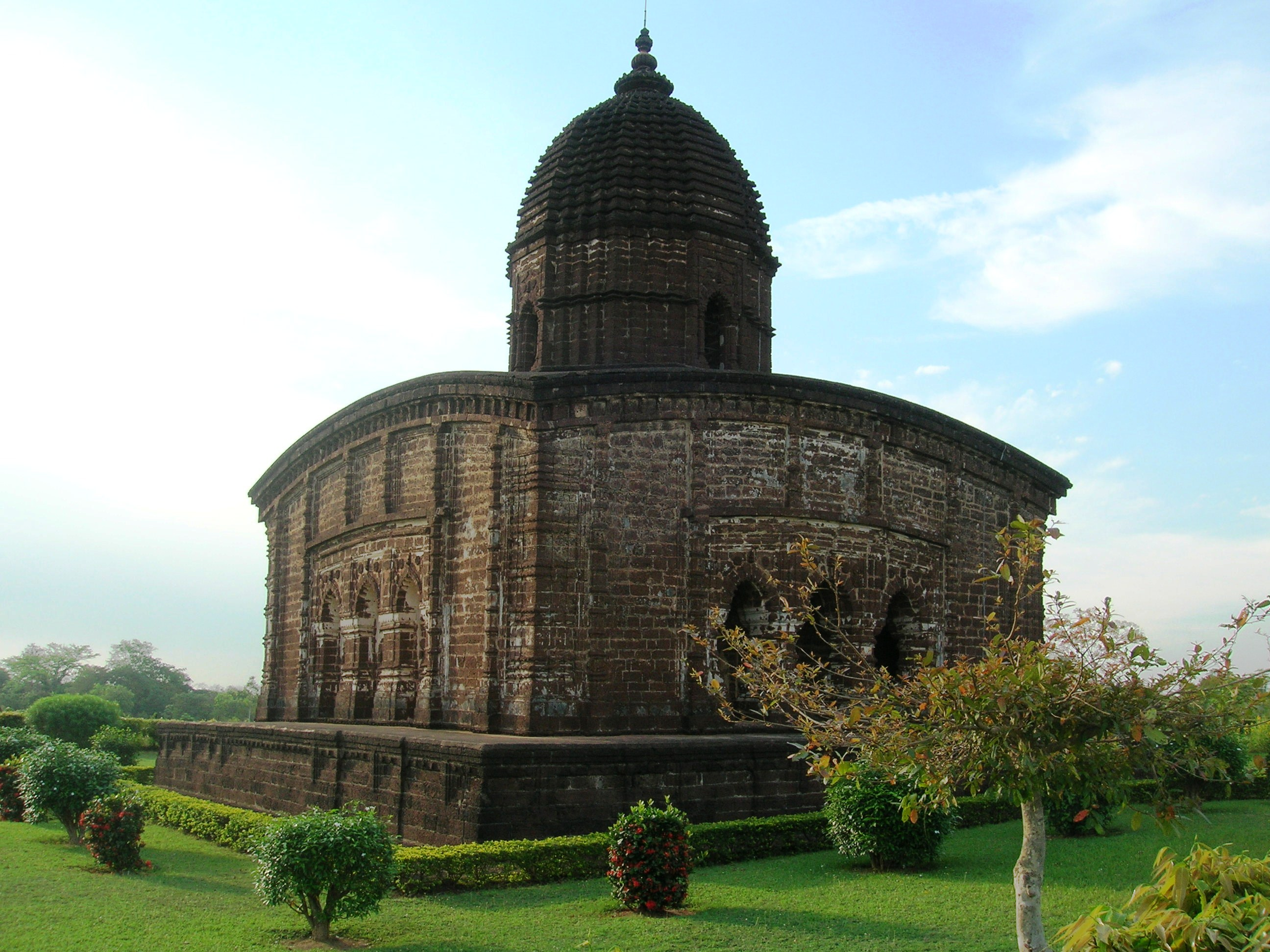
Jor Mandir (c. 1726)

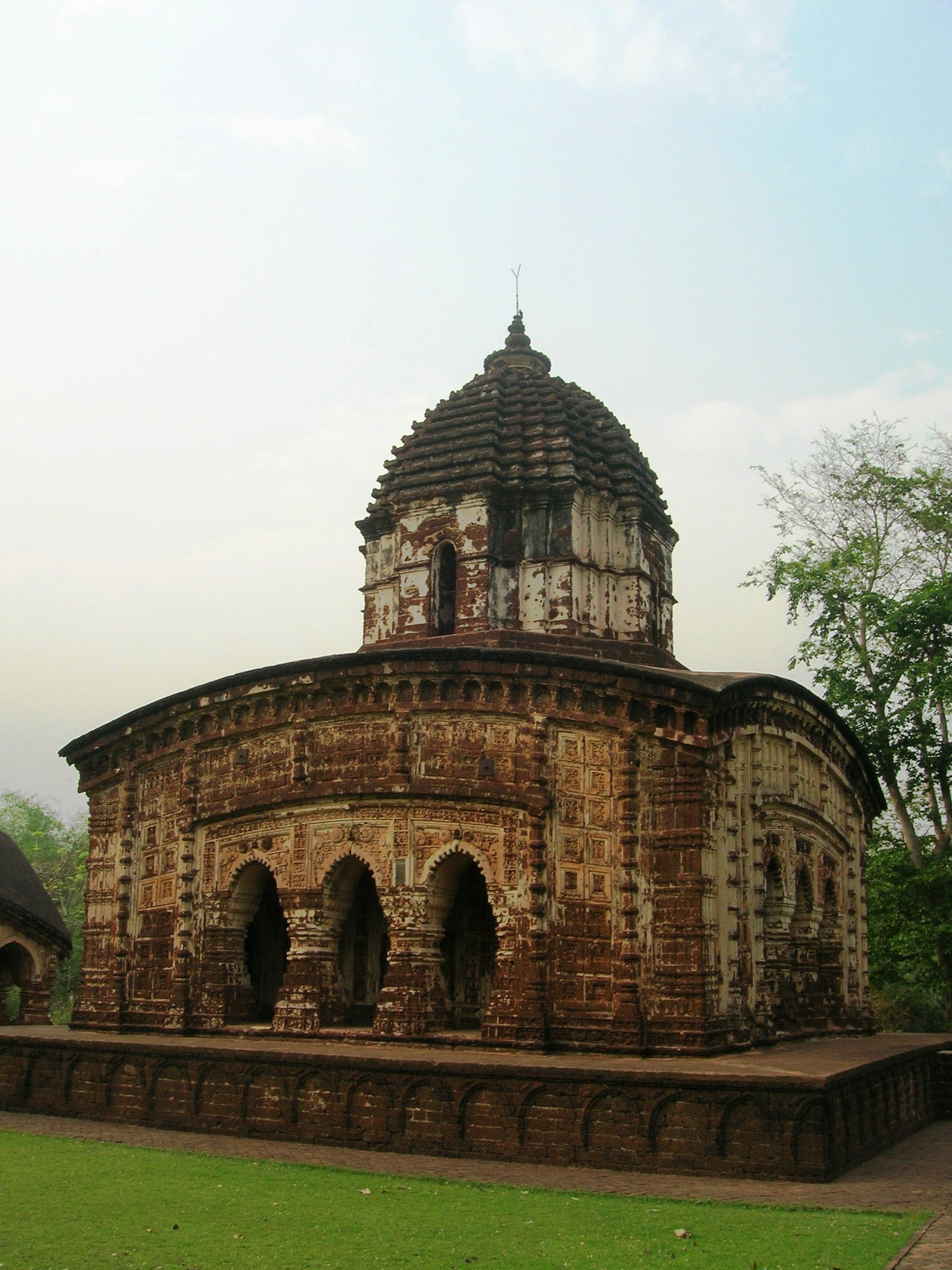
Radhamadhab Temple (c. 1737)

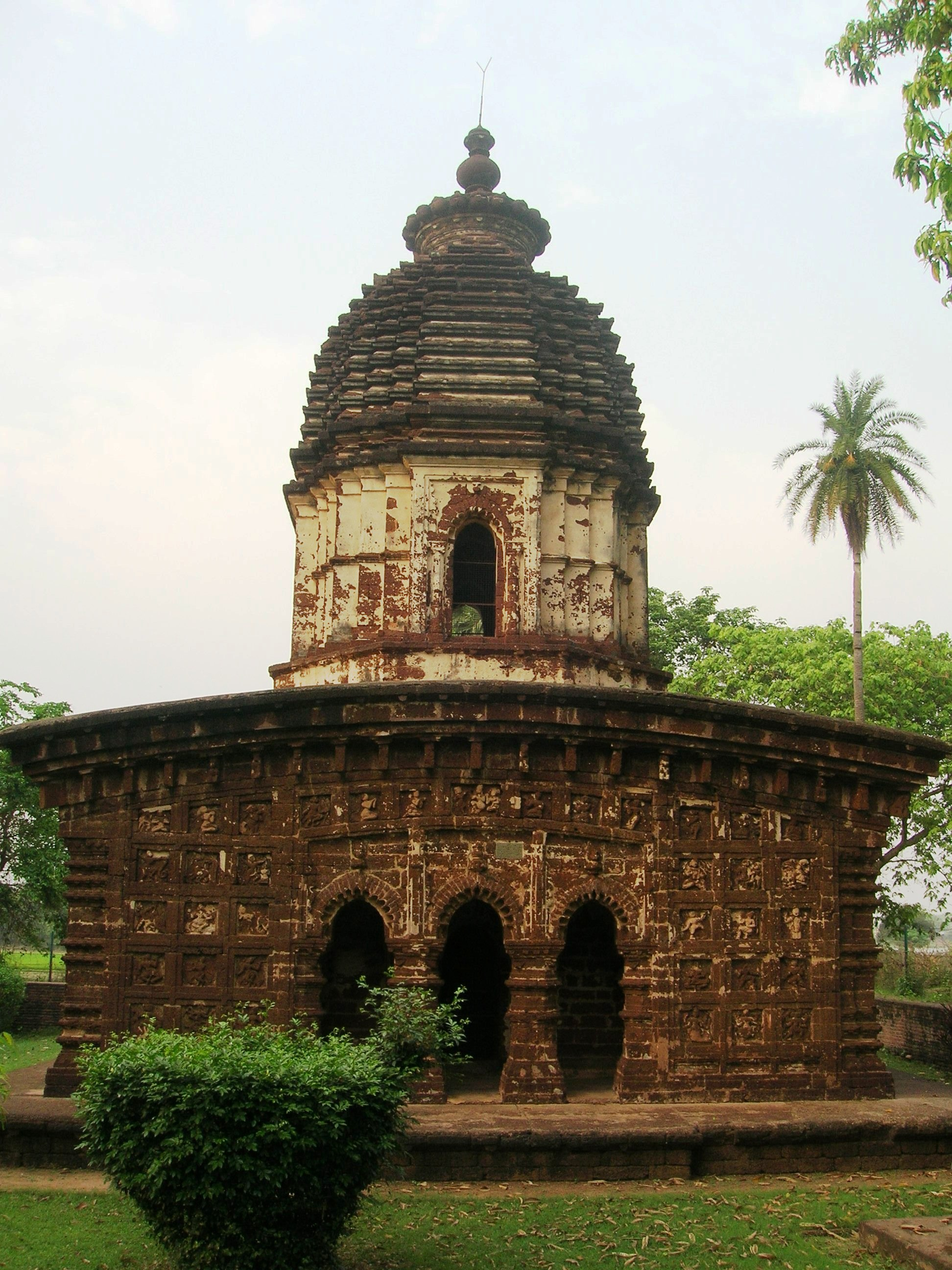
Kalachand Temple (c. 1656)

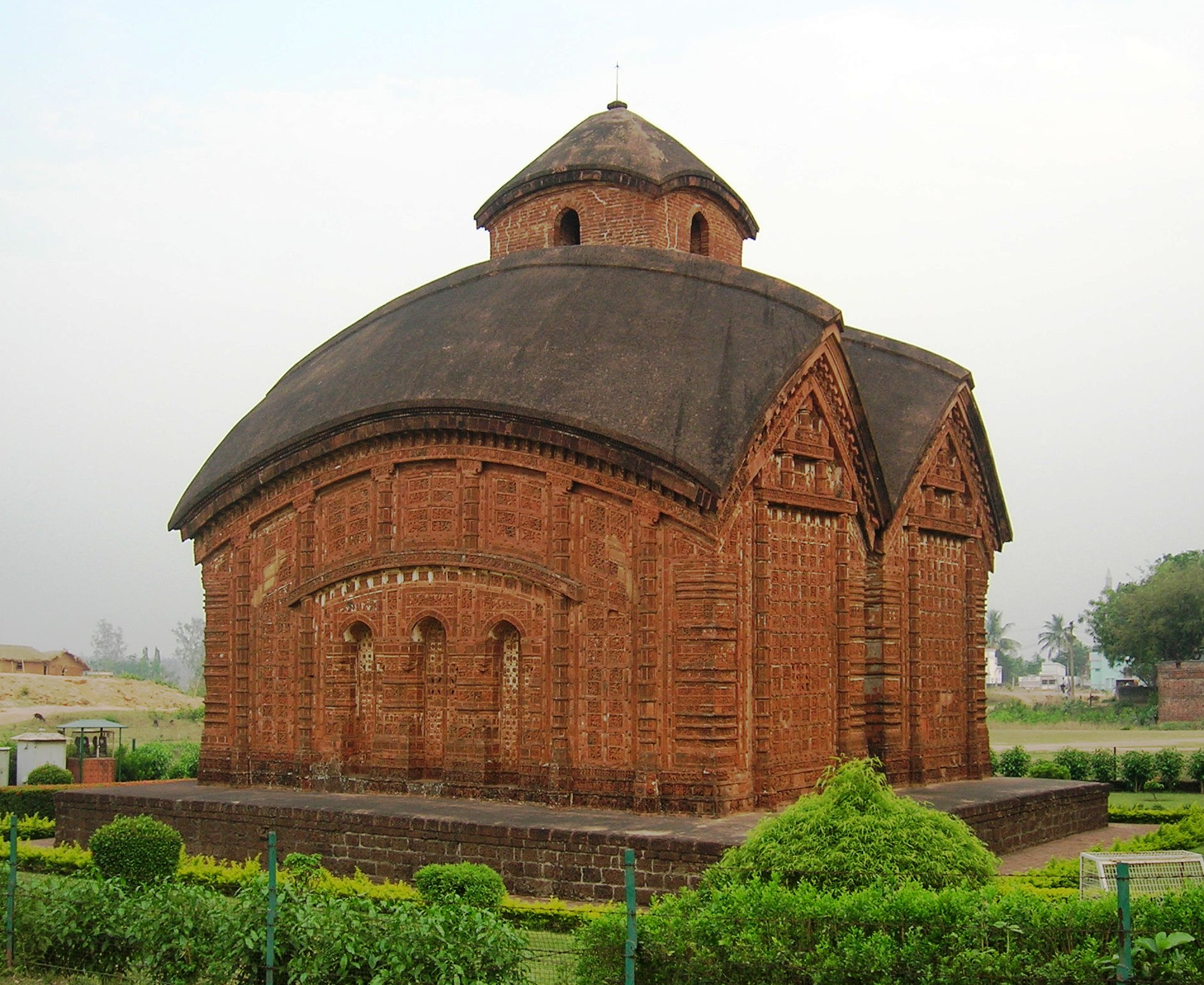
Jor-Bangla Temple or Keshta Roy Temple (c. 1655)

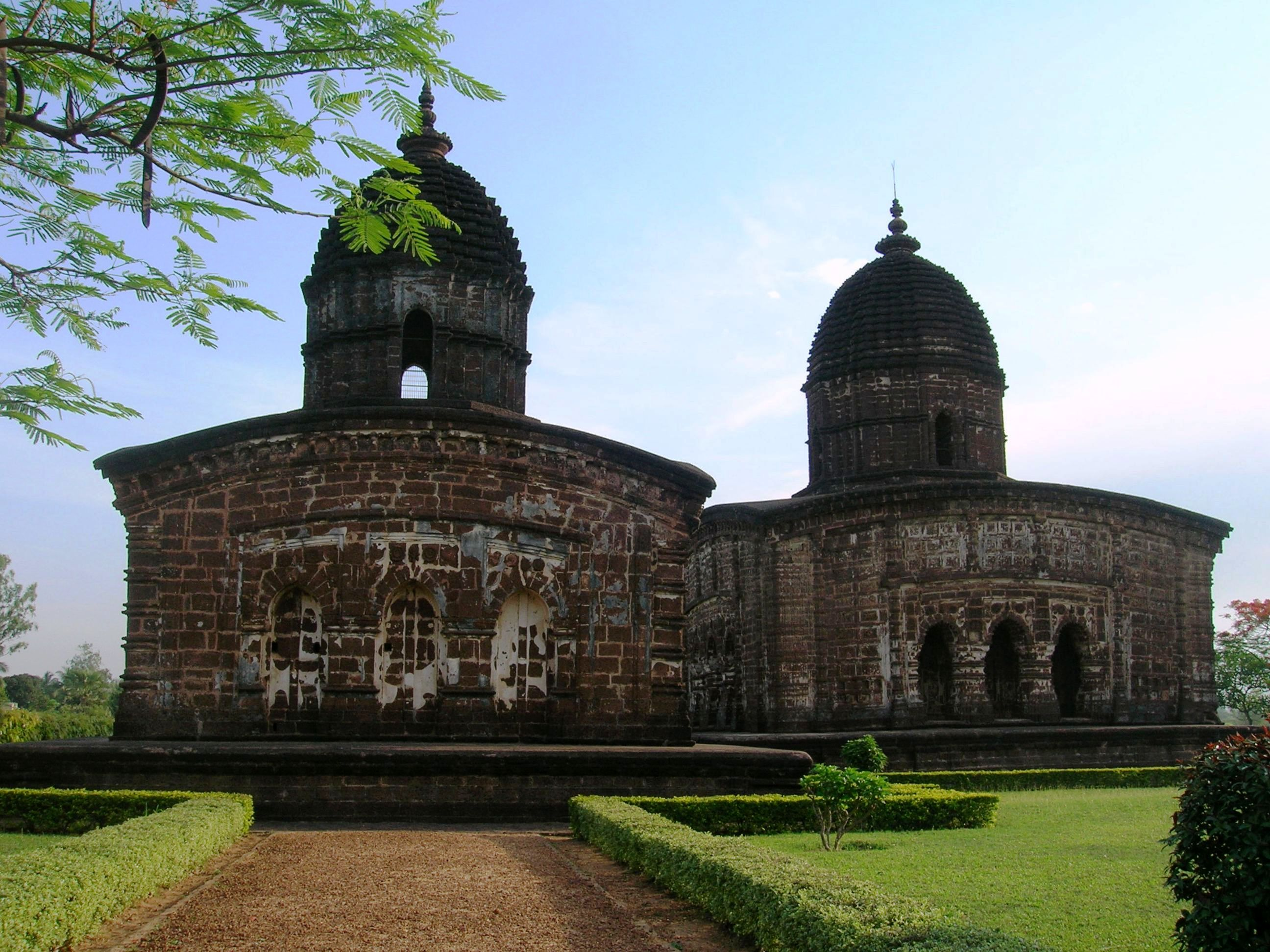
Jor Mandir complex (c. 1726)

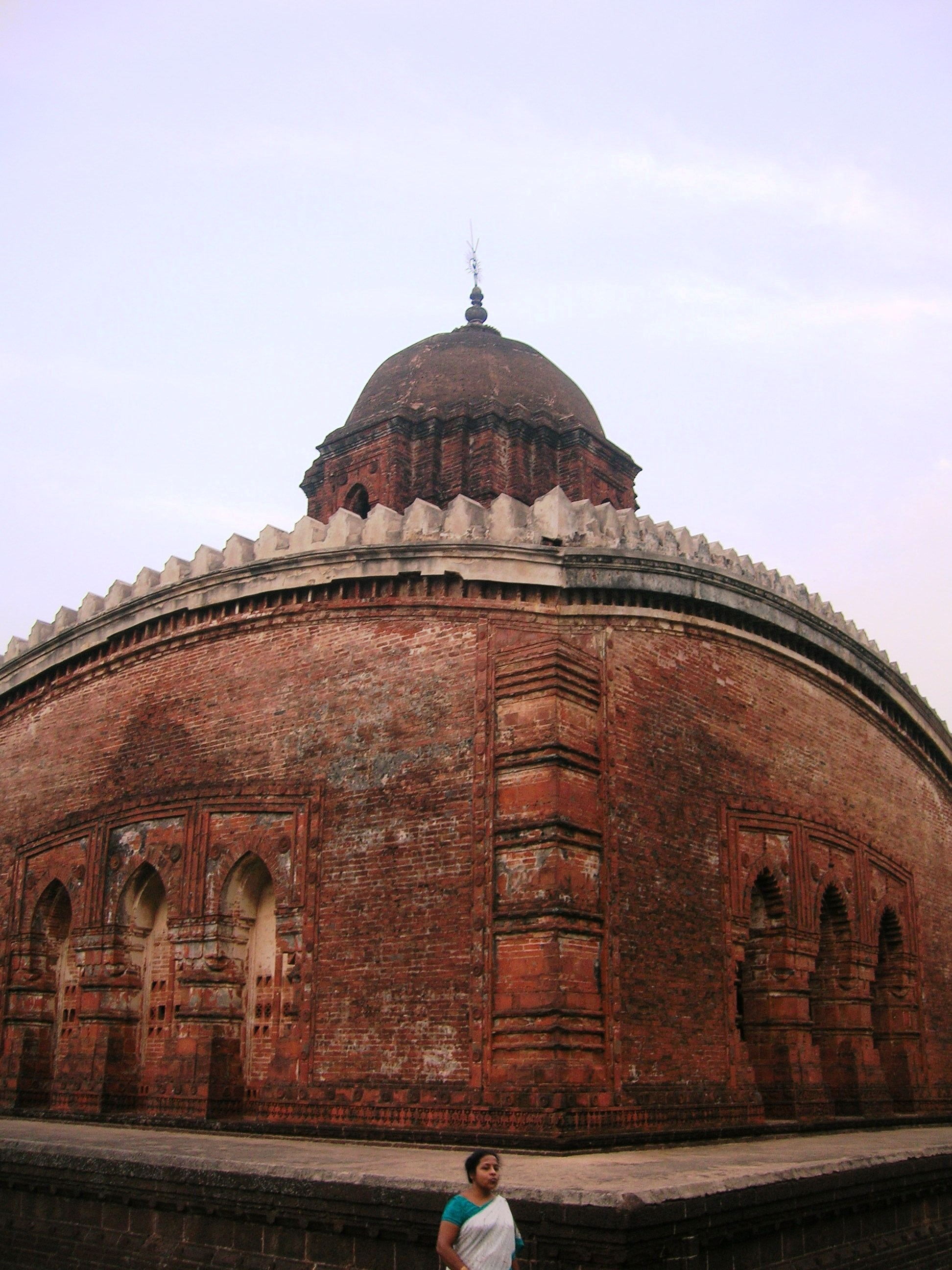
Madan Mohan Temple (c. 1694)

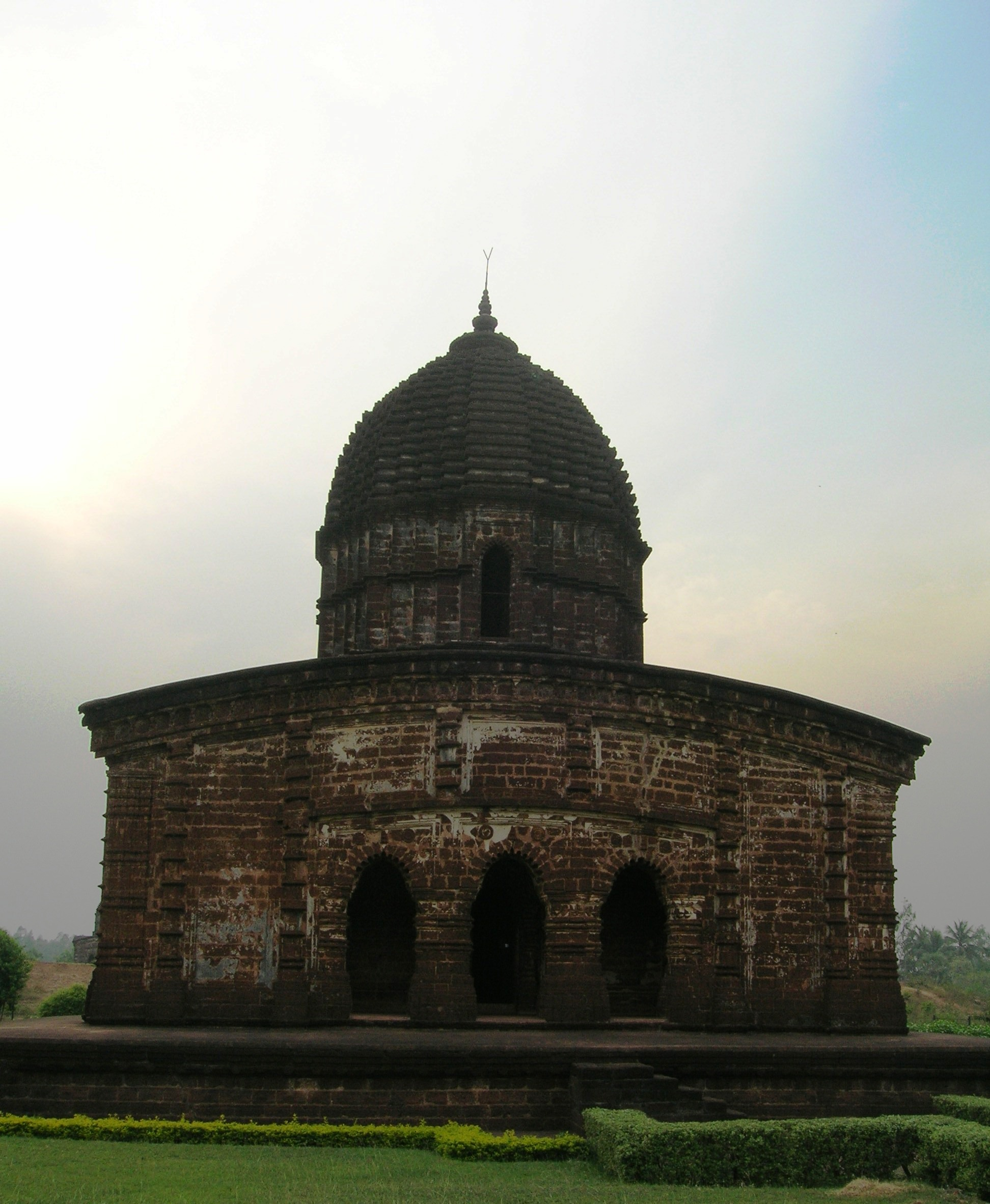
Radha-Gobinda Temple (c. 1729)

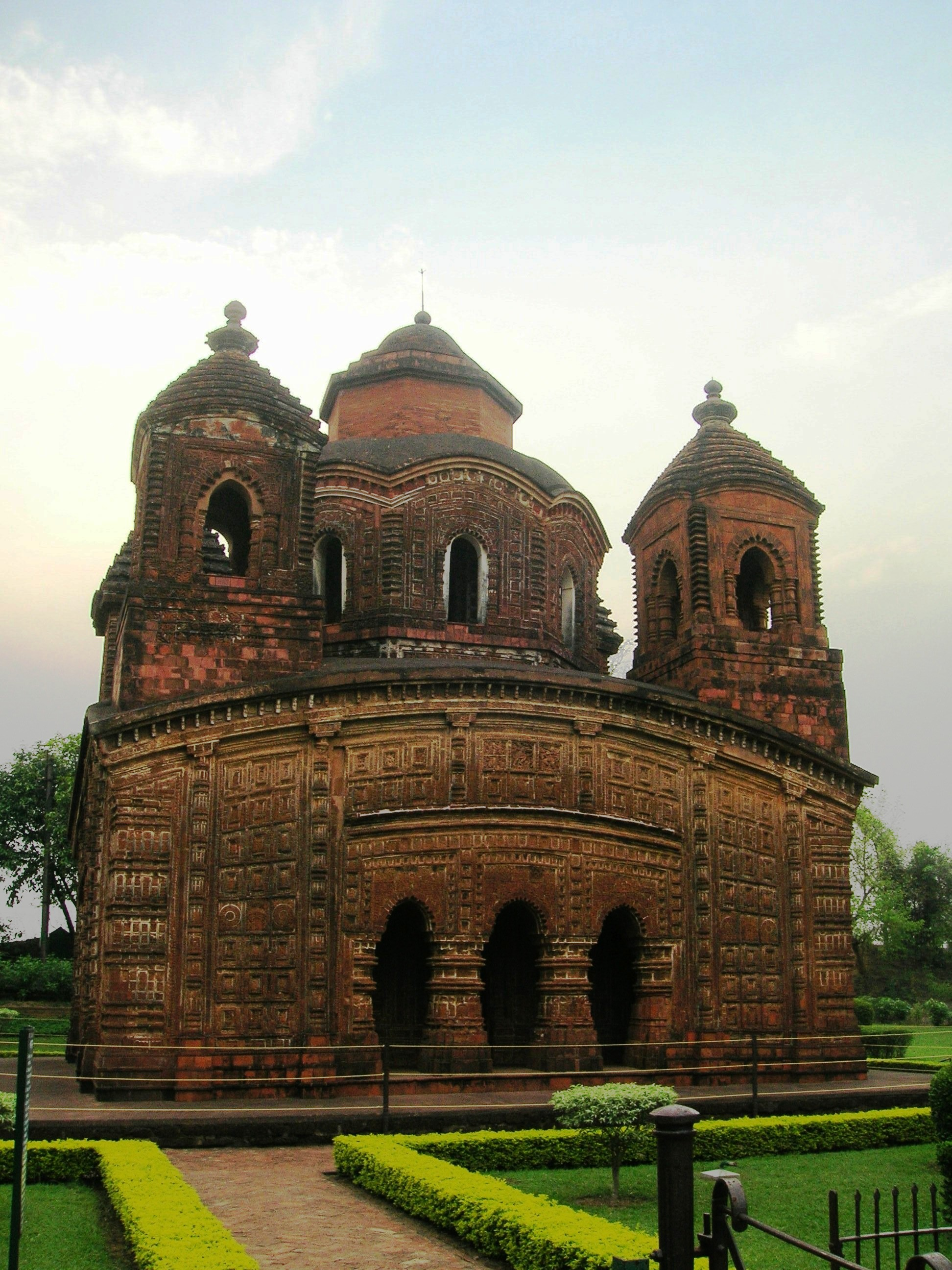
Shyam Ray Temple (c. 1643)

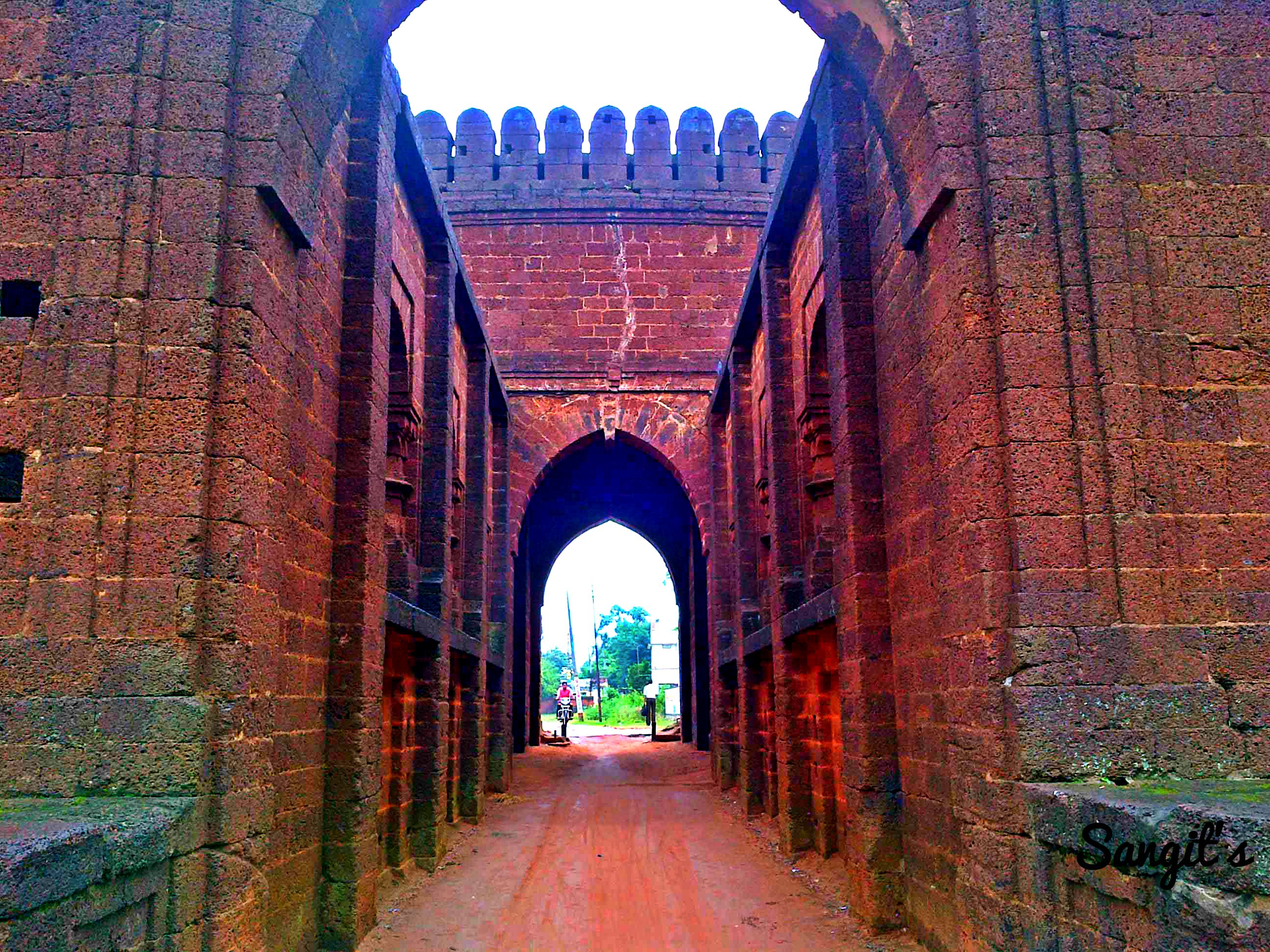
Bishnpur fort gate

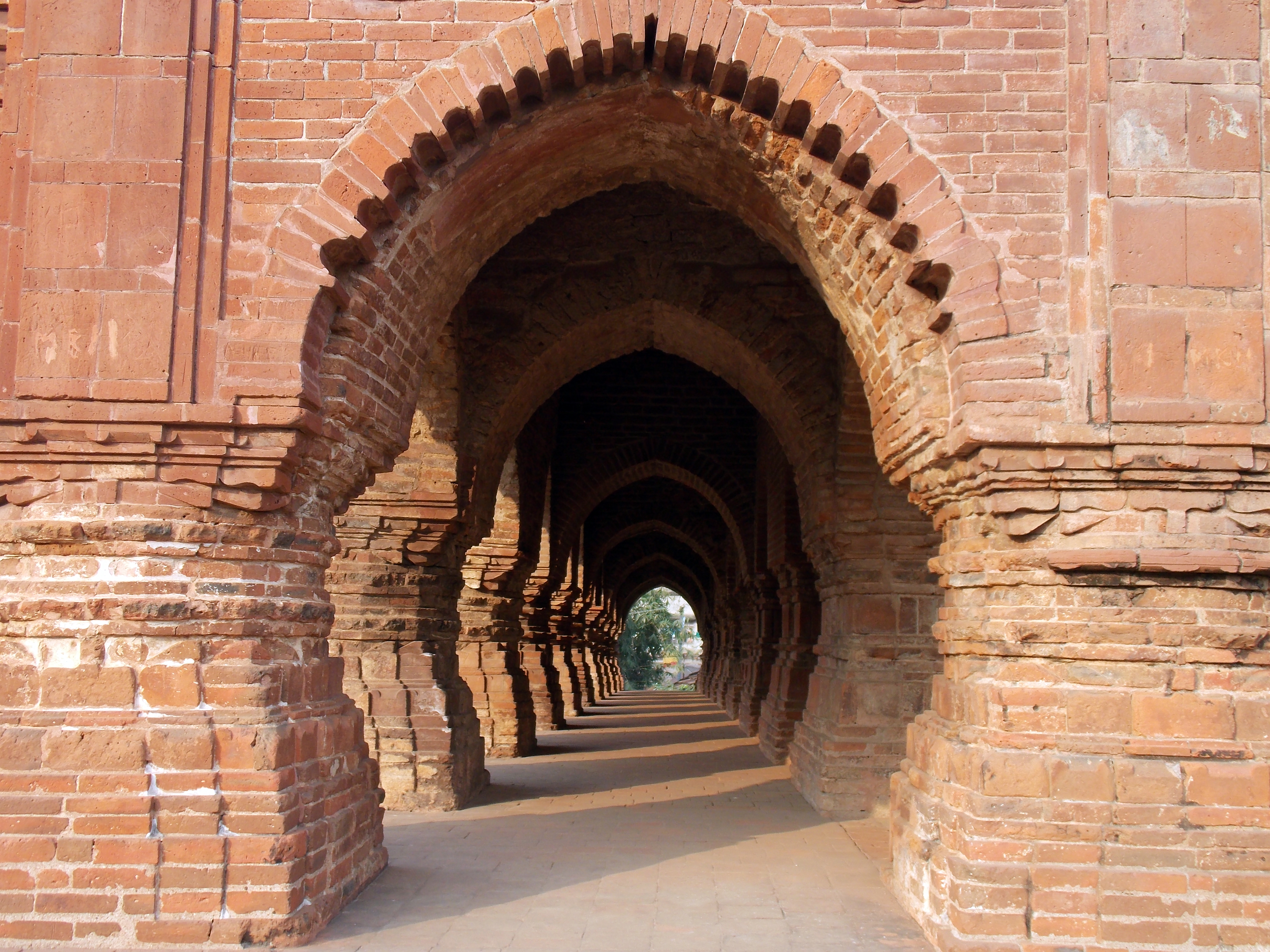
The gate of Rashmancha

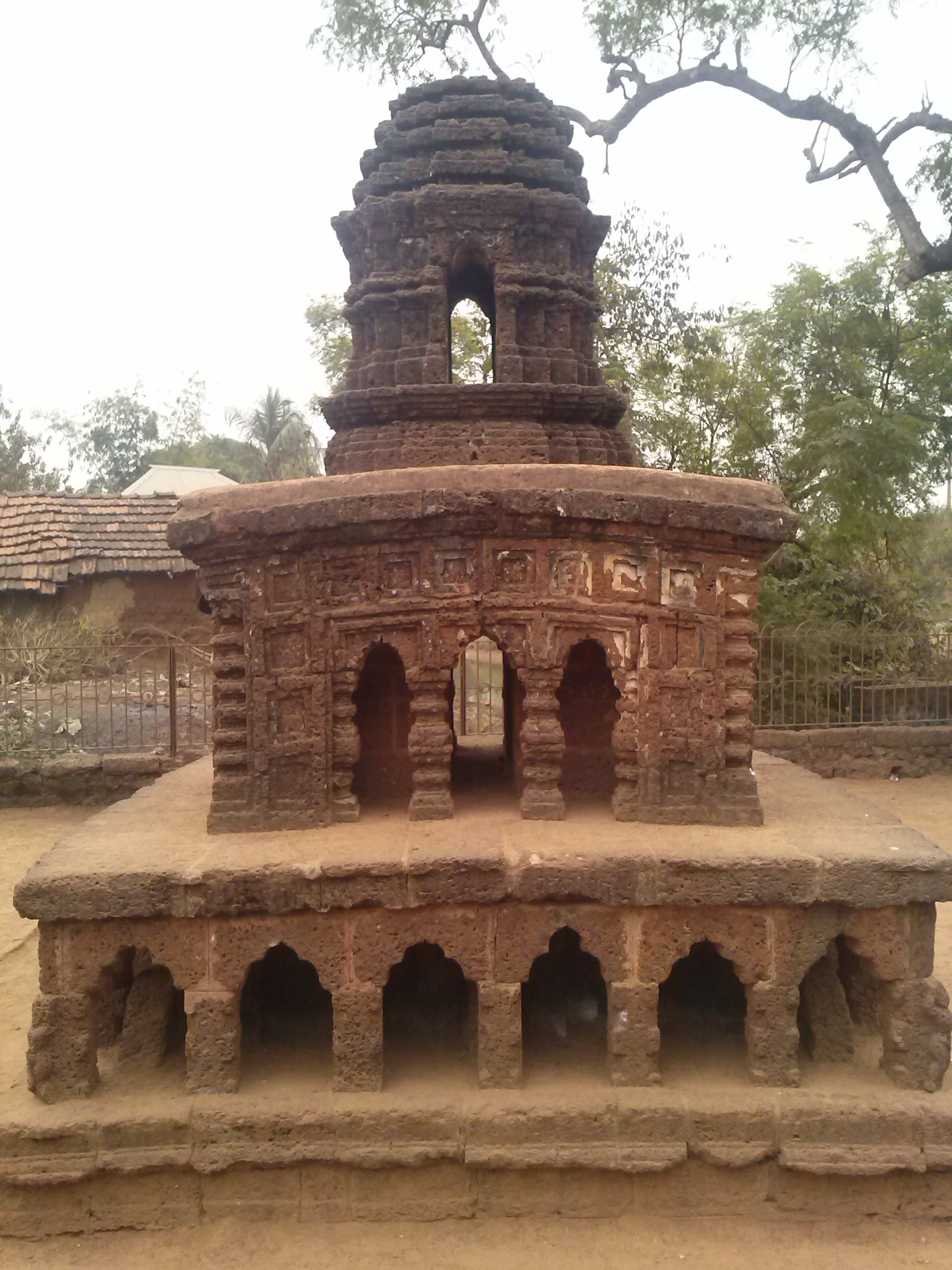
Stone chariot of Bishnupur

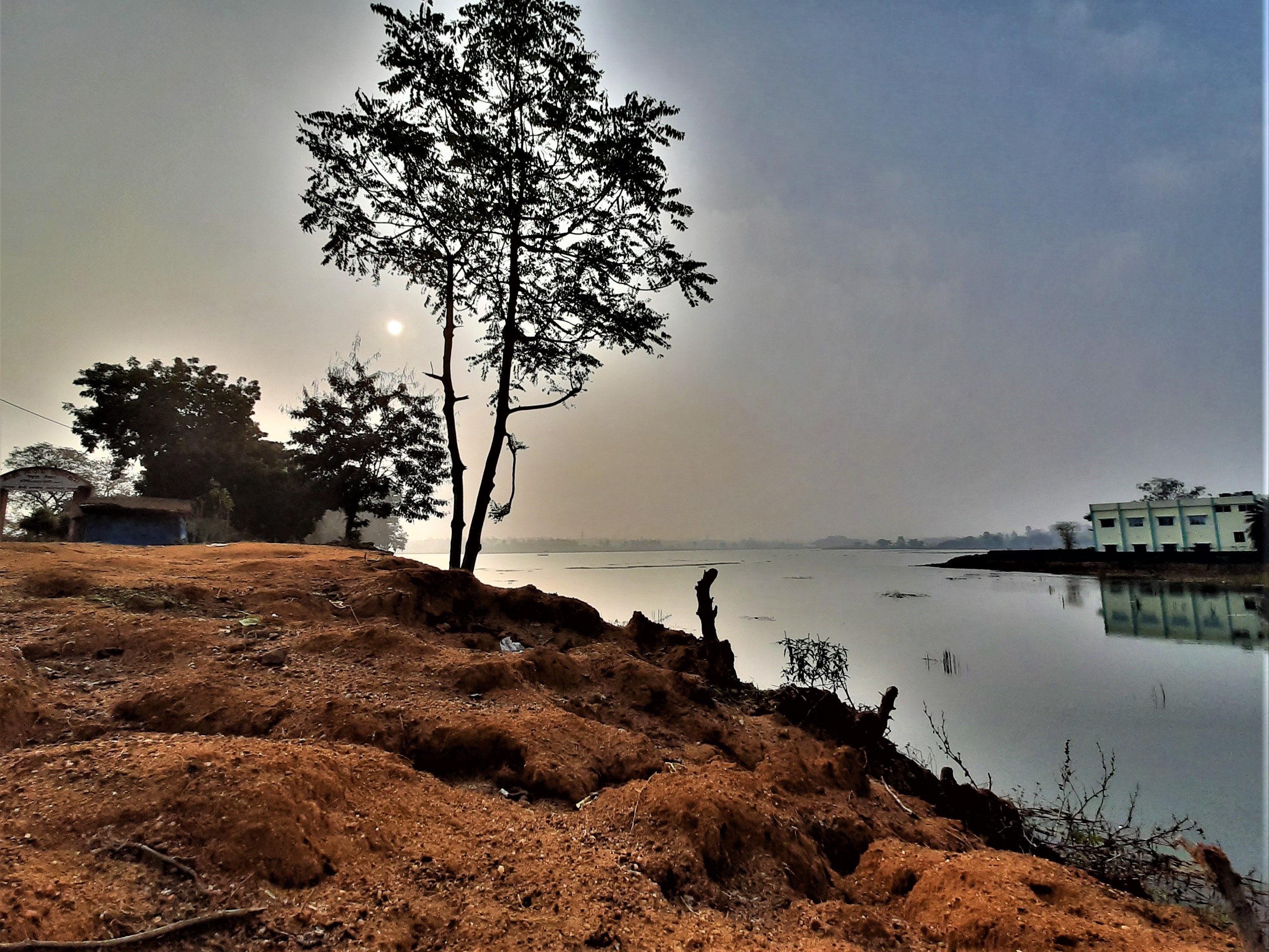
HISTORICAL LALBANDH Bishnupur West Bengal

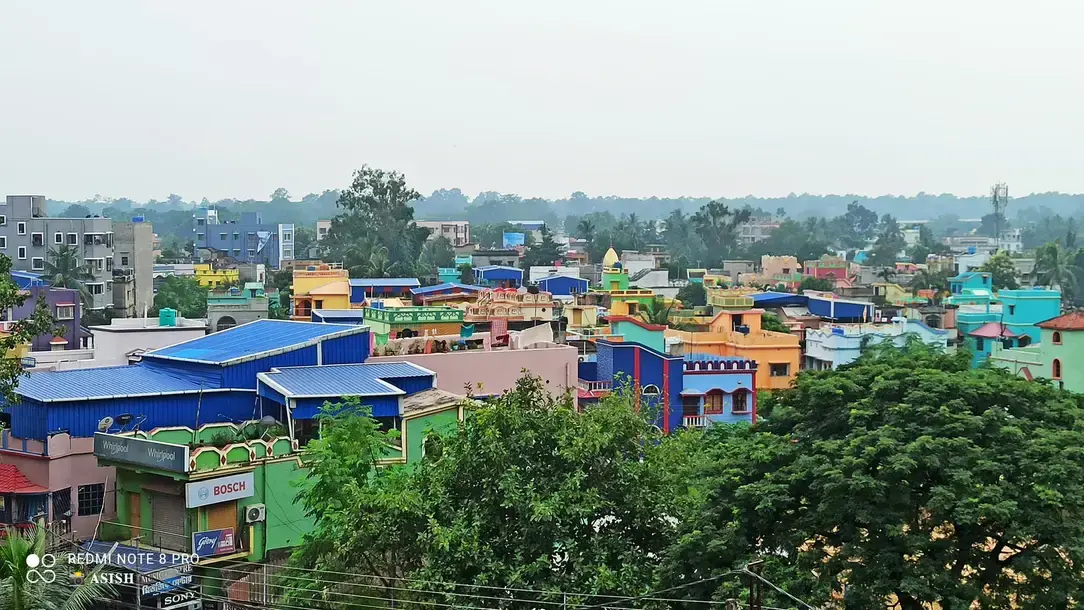
Bishnupur skyline

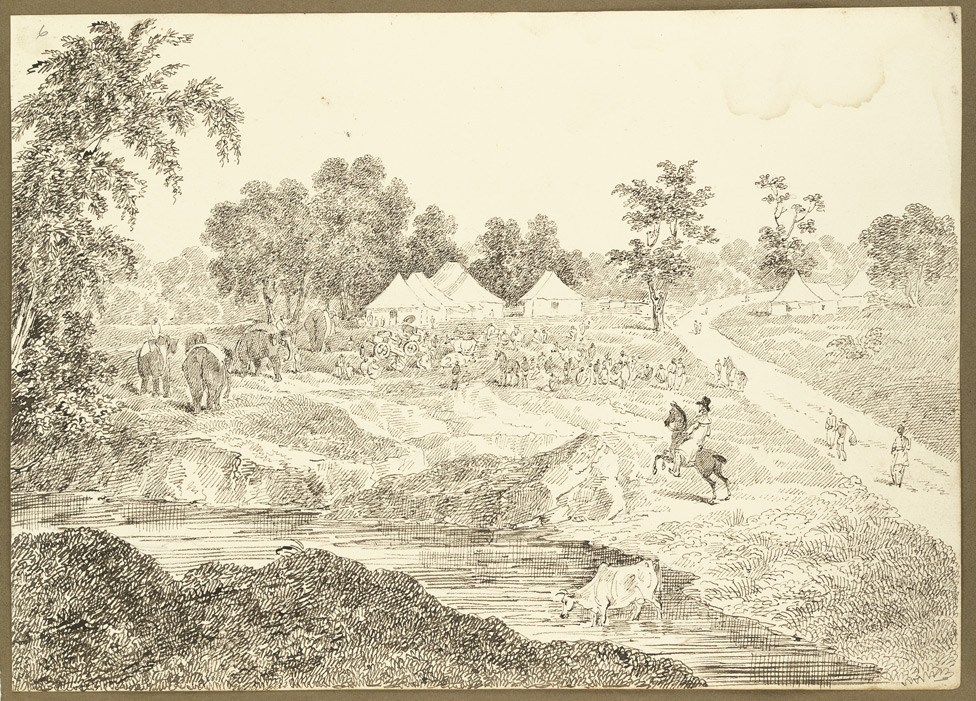
Bishnupur 1823, the capital of Mallabhum, drawing by Charles D'Oyly

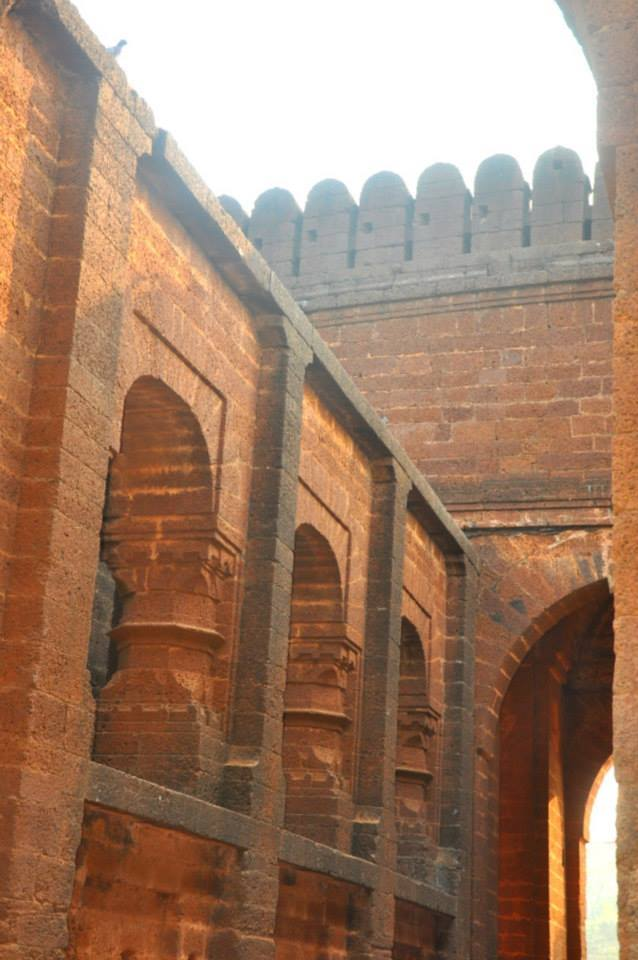
Garh Darwaja

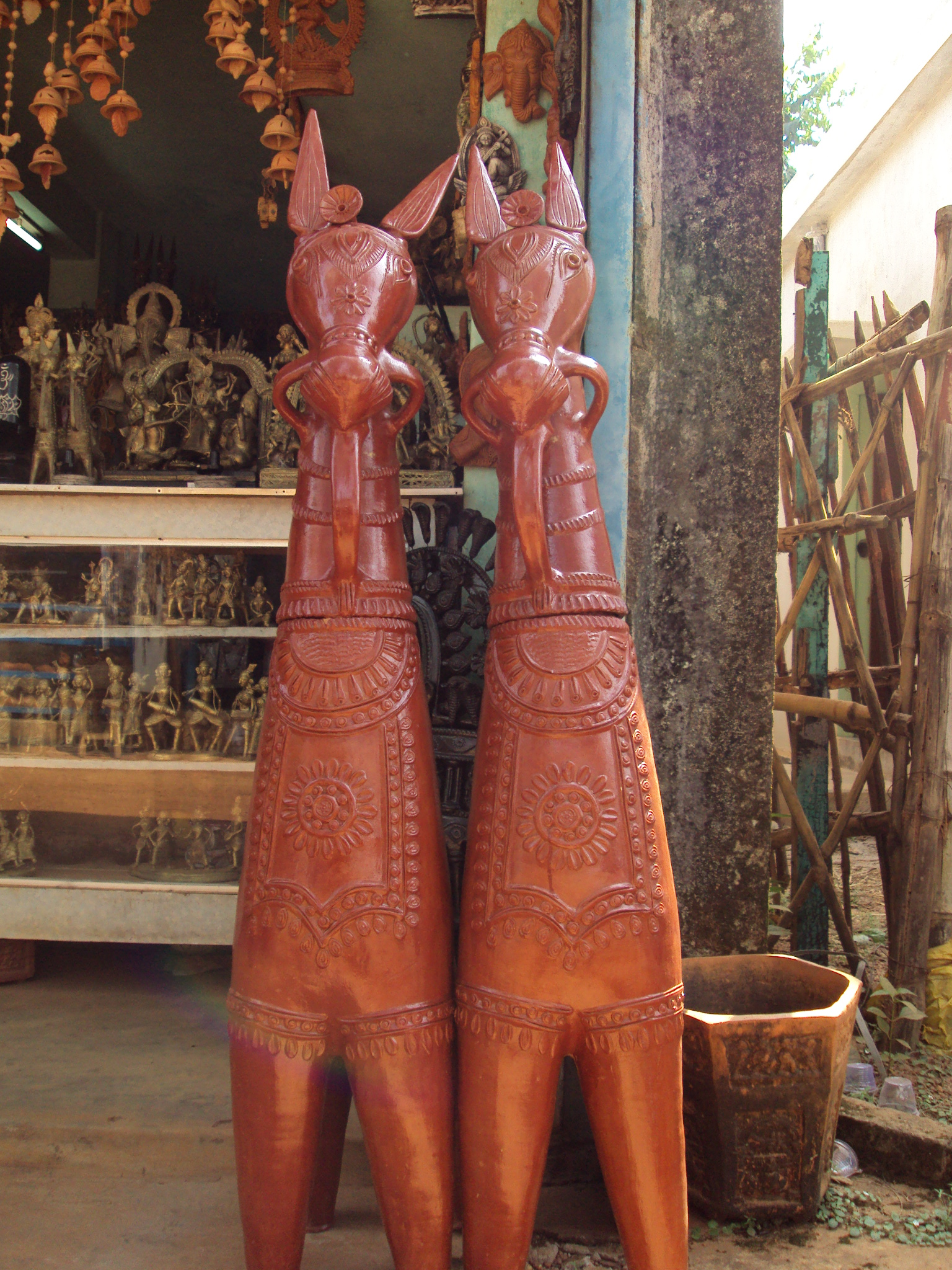
Bishnupur Terracotta horse

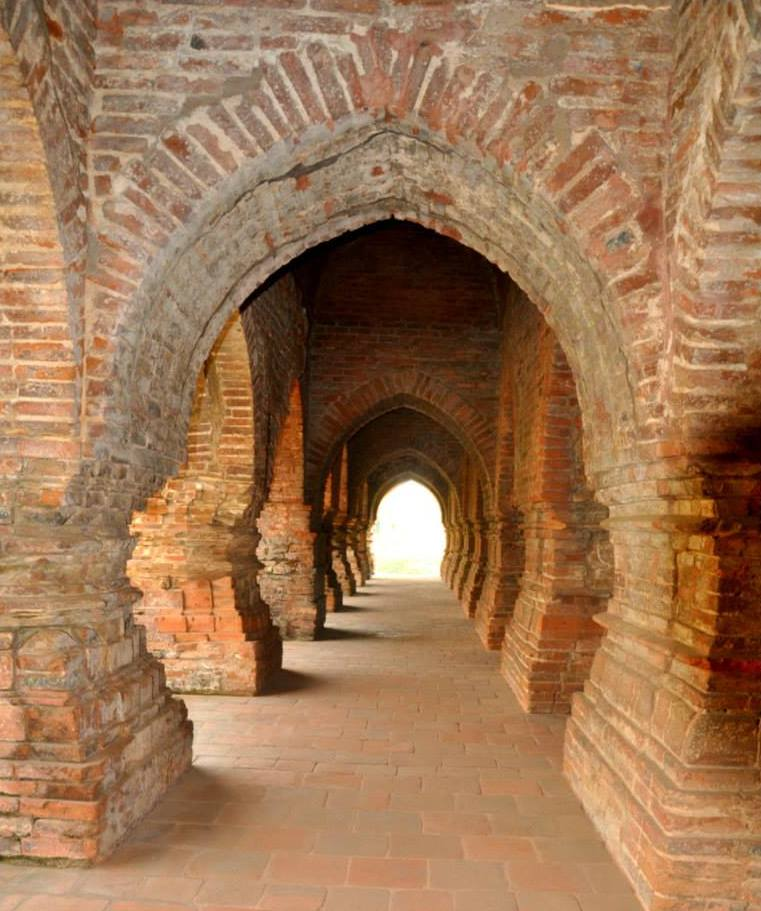
The inner part of Rasmancha
