= Rasmancha =

Historical Hindu temple in West Bengal

Ras Mancha
- রাসমঞ্চ
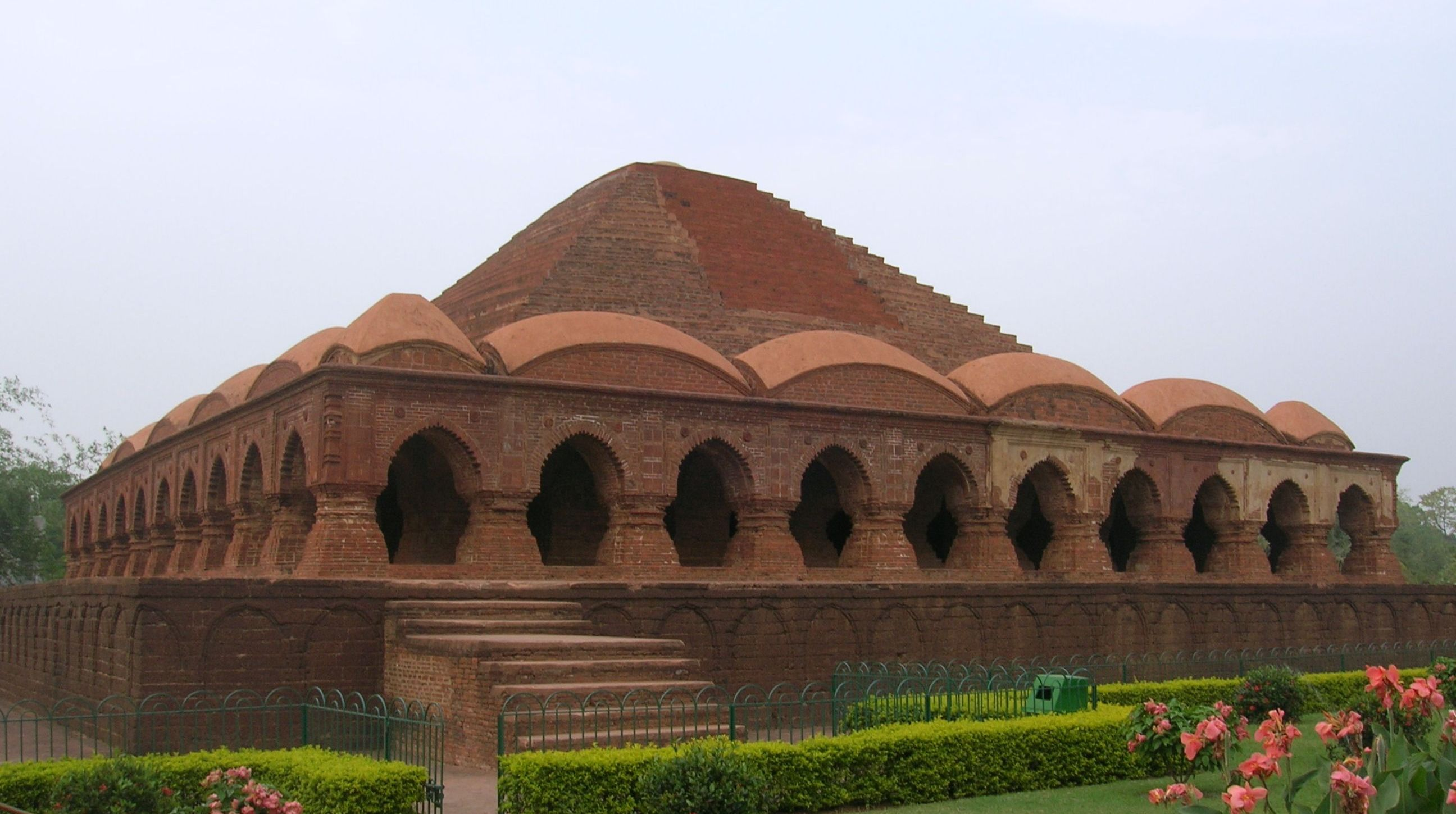
- Ras Mancha

Religion
- Affiliation: Hinduism
- District: Bankura
- Festival: Ras utsav
- Governing body: Archeological Survey of India

Location
- Location: Bishnupur
- State: West Bengal
- Country: India
- Interactive map of Ras Mancha
- Coordinates: 23°4′18.15125″N 87°19′36.44350″E

Architecture
- Type: Bengal temple architecture
- Style: Pyramid style, Chala style
- Founder: Hambir Malla Dev
- Established: 1600; 426 years ago
- Materials: Laterite Bricks and Terracotta tiles
- Monument of National Importance
- Official name: Ras Mancha
- Type: Cultural
- Reference no.: IN-WB-24

The Rasmancha (Bengali: রাসমঞ্চ; Raasmoncho) is a historical temple located at Bishnupur, Bankura district, West Bengal, India.

== History and architecture ==
It was commissioned by Mallabhum king Hambir Malla Dev (Bir Hambir) in 1600 CE. Length and breadth of this temple is 24.5 meter and the height is 12.5 meter. The base of the temple is made of laterite stone and upper part is made with bricks.

Built on a laterite plinth, it is an impressive square building with a small shrine in the centre and three-corridor galleries with vaulted roofs enclosing it. The building is used for putting up idols from other temples on the occasion of Ras festival.

During the Vaishnava Ras festival, all the Radha Krishna idols of Bishnupur town used to be brought here to be worshipped by the citizens. The annual festival was held in Rasmancha till 1932.

Rasmancha temple of Bishnupur is on the UNESCO World Heritage Site's Tentative list. The Temples are designated as Monuments of National importance by ASI.
