= Geography of Bankura district =

Geography of Bankura district
Country	India
State	West Bengal
Area	6,788 km^{2} (2,621 sq mi)
Land borders	N & NE: Bardhaman district SE: Hooghly district S: Paschim Medinipur district W: Purulia district
Highest point	Biharinath; 448 m (1,470 ft)
Longest river (on border)	Damodar River
Longest river (inside)	Dwarakeswar River
Climate:	Dry and hot summers with moderate monsoons, winters are cool
Terrain:	W&S: Lower edge of Chota Nagpur Plateau; E & NE: alluvial plains
Natural resources
Natural hazards	Nor'westers are frequent in early summer
Environmental issues

Geography of Bankura district refers to the geography of the present Bankura district in the Indian state of West Bengal.

Bankura is one of the districts of Burdwan division. It is situated between 22° 38’ and 23° 38’ north latitude and between 86° 36’ and 87° 46’ east longitude. It has an area of 6,788 square kilometres (2,621 sq mi) On the north and north-east the district is bounded by Bardhaman district, from which it is separated by the Damodar River. On the south-east it is bounded by Hooghly district, on the south by Paschim Medinipur district and on the west by Purulia district.

== Configuration ==
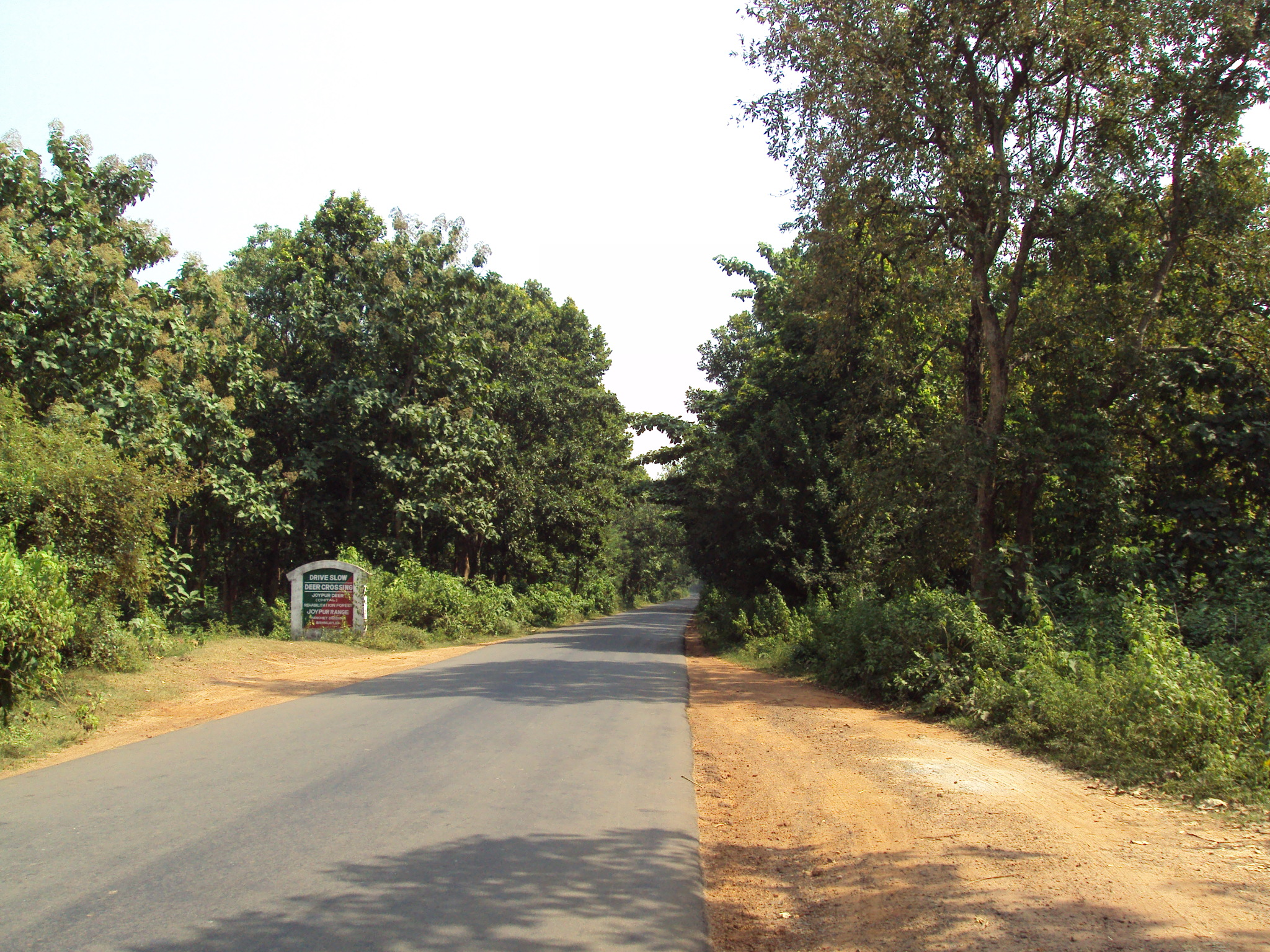
Joypur jungle

Bankura district has been described as the "connecting link between the plains of Bengal on the east and Chota Nagpur Plateau on the west." The areas to the east and north-east are low lying alluvial plains, similar to predominating rice lands of Bengal. To the west the surface gradually rises, giving way to undulating country, interspersed with rocky hillocks. Much of the country is covered with jungles.

The area consists of two different tracts. The western portion marks the gradual descent from the table land of Chota Nagpur to the delta of lower Bengal, consisting largely of spurs projecting from the western tableland and of low swelling ridges. However, there is no marked ridge of hills. In the central portion of the district there are rolling downs eventually merging with the alluvial plains.

The western part of the district has poor, ferruginous soil and hard beds of laterite with scrub jungles and sal (Shorea robusta) woods. Long broken ridges with irregular patches of more recent alluvium have marks of seasonal cultivation. During the long dry season large extents of red soil with hardly any trees lend the country a scorched and dreary appearance. In the eastern part the eye constantly rests on wide expanses of rice fields, green in the rains but parched and dry in summer.

== Hills ==
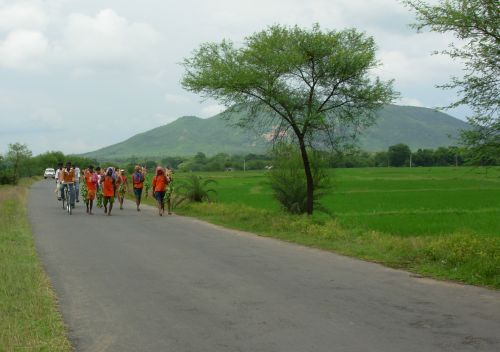
Susunia hills

The hills of the district consist of outliers of the Chota Nagpur plateau and only two are of any great height – Biharinath and Susunia. While the former rises to a height of 448 metres (1,470 ft), the latter attains a height of 440 metres (1,440 ft). There are a number of low hills in the Saltora area. There are small hills, e.g. the Mejia hill rising to a mere 60 metres (200 ft) from the base or the Karo hill, halfway between Mejia and Bankura, rising a little higher to about 120 metres (390 ft). To the south, in the police station areas of Khatra and Raipur there are picturesque low hills, locally called Masaker Pahar.

== Rivers ==
The rivers of the area flow from the north-east to the south-west in courses roughly parallel to one another. They are mostly hill streams, originating in the hills in the west. The rivers come down in floods after heavy rains and subside as rapidly as they rise. In summer, their sand beds are almost always dry.

Damodar River forms the northern boundary of the district with Bardhaman district for about 72 kilometres (45 mi) and then flows into Bardhaman district. Floods in the Damodar rarely do much damage to the district. Sali River which drains the northern part of the district is an important tributary of the Damodar.

Amongst the other rivers flowing through the district, the most important is Dwarakeswar River. It has many branches or old beds in Onda and Bishnupur police station areas. The main tributaries of Dwarakeswar River are the Gandheswari, the Kukhra, and the Birai. Other major rivers are Shilabati River and Kangsabati River, both of which enter the district from Purulia district, run along a short course in the territory and then enter Paschim Medinipur district. Gandheswari River is a tributary of Dwarakeswar River and flows in Bankura district. Flowing south-west of Susunia Hill and north of Bankura it joins the Dwarakeswar near Bhutsahar. It is subject to sudden flooding during rains. There are some small but picturesque water falls along the course of the Shilabati near Harmasra, and along the course of the Kangsabati in the Raipur area. Amongst the minor rivers in the district are Jaypanda, a tributary of Shilabati, and Bhairabbanki.

Mejia Beel is a large swamp formed by the overflow of the Damodar. There are several small tanks or artificial lakes developed by the former rajas, in and around Bishnupur.

=== River projects ===
Kangsabati Project was started during the second five-year plan period (1956–1961). The dam across the Kangsabati has a length of 10,098 metres (33,130 ft) and a height of 38 metres (125 ft). Apart from this dam there are two pick up barrages in the Shilabati and the Bhairabbanki.

There is a proposal for the construction of a dam across the Dwarakeswar. The preliminary project report on Dwarakeswar Gandheswari Reservoir was received in Central Water Commission in January, 2004 for which ‘in- principle’ consent of Central Water Commission for preparation of detailed Project Report has been conveyed to the State Government in March, 2004.

== Geology ==
The greater portion of the district consists of a rolling country covered by laterite and alluvium. While metamorphic or gneissose rocks are found to the extreme west, to the east there is a wide plain of recent alluvium. Strong massive runs of hornblendic varieties stretch across the region in tolerably continuous lines, the general strike being nearly east and west.

The most characteristic geological feature of the district is the area of laterite and associated rocks of sand and gravel. At some places one finds hard beds of laterite. At other places it is decomposed and reorganised. Locally, the ferruginous rock is called kankar. The calcareous concretions, commonly used as the sources of lime, are known as ghutin.

The Gondwana system is represented in the northern portion of the district, south of the Damodar, between Mejia and Biharinath Hill. The beds covered with alluvium contains seams of coal belonging to the Raniganj system.

== Climate ==
The climate, especially in the upland tracts to the west, is much drier than in eastern or southern Bengal. From the beginning of March to early June, when the monsoon sets in, hot westerly winds prevail, the thermometer in the shade rising to around 45 °C (113 °F). The westerly winds die down around sunset and allow cool winds to blow from the south. Nor'westers are frequent during this period and help to mitigate the excessive heat.

The monsoon months, June to September, are comparatively pleasant, as the weather is not as sultry as in other parts of Bengal. The total average rainfall is 1,400 millimetres (55 in), the bulk of the rain coming in the months of June to September.

Winters are pleasant with temperatures dropping down to below 27 °C (81 °F) in December.

== Subdivisions ==
The district comprises three subdivisions: Bankura Sadar, Khatra and Bishnupur. Bankura Sadar subdivision consists of Bankura municipality and eight community development blocs: Bankura — I, Bankura — II, Barjora, Chhatna, Gangajalghati, Mejia, Onda and Shaltora. Khatra subdivision consists of eight community development blocs: Indpur, Khatra, Hirbandh, Raipur, Sarenga, Ranibandh, Simlapal and Taldangra. Bishnupur subdivision consists of Bishnupur and Sonamukhi municipalities and six community development blocks: Indas, Joypur, Patrasayar, Kotulpur, Sonamukhi and Bishnupur.

Bankura is the district headquarters. There are 21 police stations, 22 development blocks, 3 municipalities, 190 gram panchayats and 5187 villages in this district.

Other than municipality area, each subdivision contains community development blocs which in turn are divided into rural areas and census towns. In total there are 5 urban units: 3 municipalities and 2 census towns.

=== Bankura Sadar subdivision ===
- One municipality: Bankura
- Bankura — I community development bloc consists of rural areas only with 6 gram panchayats.
- Bankura — II community development bloc consists of rural areas only with 7 gram panchayats.
- Barjora community development bloc consists of rural areas with 11 gram panchayats and two census towns: Barjora and Beliatore.
- Chhatna community development bloc consists of rural areas only with 13 gram panchayats.
- Gangajalghati community development bloc consists of rural areas only with 10 gram panchayats.
- Mejia community development bloc consists of rural areas only with 5 gram panchayats.
- Onda community development bloc consists of rural areas only with 15 gram panchayats.
- Shaltora community development bloc consists of rural areas only with 8 gram panchayats.

=== Khatra subdivision ===
- Indpur community development bloc consists of rural areas only with 7 gram panchayats.
- Khatra community development bloc consists of rural areas only with 7 gram panchayats.
- Hirbandh community development bloc consists of rural areas only with 5 gram panchayats.
- Raipur community development bloc consists of rural areas only with 10 gram panchayats.
- Sarenga community development bloc consists of rural areas only with 6 gram panchayats.
- Ranibandh community development bloc consists of rural areas only with 8 gram panchayats.
- Simlapal community development bloc consists of rural areas only with 7 gram panchayats.
- Taldangra community development bloc consists of rural areas only with 9 gram panchayats.

=== Bishnupur subdivision ===
- Two municipalities: Bishnupur and Sonamukhi.
- Indas community development bloc consists of rural areas only with 10 gram panchayats.
- Joypur community development bloc consists of rural areas only with 9 gram panchayats.
- Patrasayar community development bloc consists of rural areas only with 10 gram panchayats.
- Kotulpur community development bloc consists of rural areas only with 8 gram panchayats.
- Sonamukhi community development bloc consists of rural areas only with 10 gram panchayats.
- Bishnupur community development bloc consists of rural areas only with 9 gram panchayats.
