= Bheduasole =

- Gram Panchayat, Village
- Location in West Bengal, India Bheduasole (India)
- Coordinates: 23.1147214°N 86.9066836°E
- Country: India
- State: West Bengal
- District: Bankura
- Elevation: 145 m (476 ft)

Languages
  - Official: Bengali, English
- Time zone: UTC+5:30 (IST)
- Postal Index Number: 722121
- ISO 3166 code: IN-WB
- Website: bankura.gov.in

Bheduasole is a medium-sized Gram Panchayat and village in Indpur Block in Bankura District of the Indian state of West Bengal. It is located in Burdwan Division . It is located 23 km towards west from District headquarters Bankura and 187 km from State capital Kolkata.

Pin code of Bheduasole is 722121 and postal head office is Bheduasole.

== Location ==
Baharamuri ( 7 km ), Indpur ( 7 km ), Baidyanathpur ( 10 km ), Molian ( 11 km ), Hirbandh ( 13 km ) are the nearby Villages to Bheduasole. Bankura, Adra, Purulia, Raghunathpur, Sonamukhi are the nearby Cities to Bheduasole. The nearest railway connection is Bheduasol railway station. Bheduasole is surrounded by Hirbandh Block towards west, Khatra-I Block towards South, Bankura-I Block and Taldangra Block towards East.

== Demographics, Census 2011 ==
Total 310 families reside in Bheduasole Village. The Bheduasole village has a total population of 1581 out of which 833 are males while 748 are females as per Population Census 2011.

Bheduasol village has a population of children with age 0-6 of 186 which makes up 11.76% of the total population of the village. Average Sex Ratio of Bheduasol village is 898 females per 1000 males which are lower than West Bengal state average of 950 females per 100 males. Child Sex Ratio for the Bheduasol as per census is 938 females per 1000 males, lower than West Bengal average of 956.

Bheduasol village has a lower literacy rate compared to West Bengal. In 2011, the literacy rate of Bheduasol village was 71.04% compared to 76.26% of the whole West Bengal. In Bheduasol Male literacy rate is 85.48% while the female literacy rate is 54.86%.

According to the constitution of India and Panchyati Raaj Act, Bheduasol village is administrated by Sarpanch (Head of Village) who is an elected representative of village.

The local Language is Bengali.
