= Baurisol =

- Village
- Bourisole
- Location in West Bengal, India Baurisol (India)
- Coordinates: 22°55′30″N 87°01′56″E
- Country: India
- State: West Bengal
- District: Bankura
- Subdivision: Khatra
- Block: Simlapal
- Founder: Ajodhyaran Pain & Bajjuram Pain

Population (2011 Census)
  - Total: 685

Official
  - Language: Bengali
- Time zone: UTC+5.30
- PIN Code: 722160

Baurisol is a village in Simlapal, Bankura, West Bengal, India.

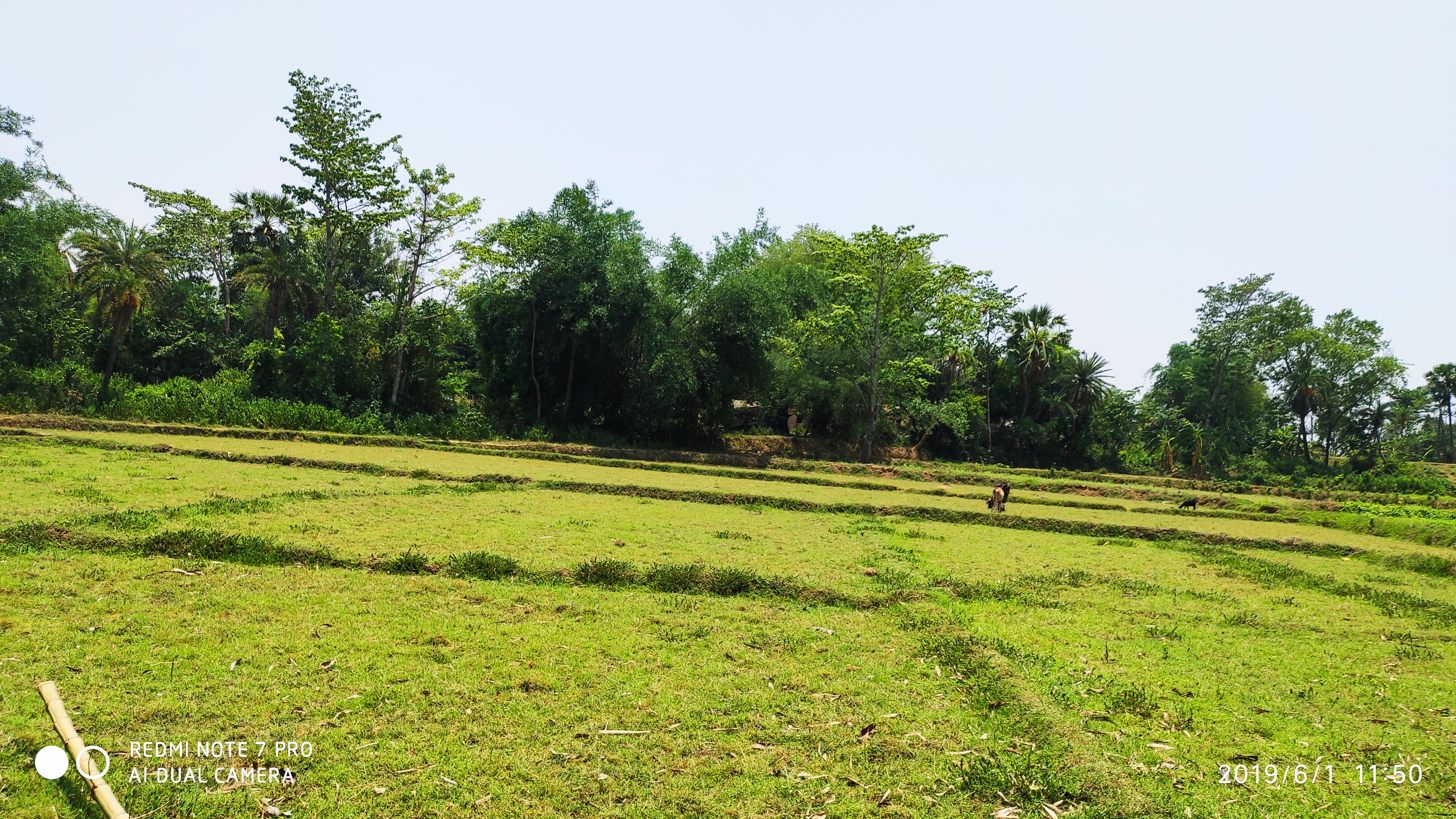
Natural Beauty of Baurisol

== Population and education ==
=== Population ===
In 2011 census, the population of the village is 685.

=== Education ===
There is a Primary School named, Baurisole Primary School is situated in the village. The primary school was founded in 1955. The literacy rate of the village is 95%.

== Geography ==
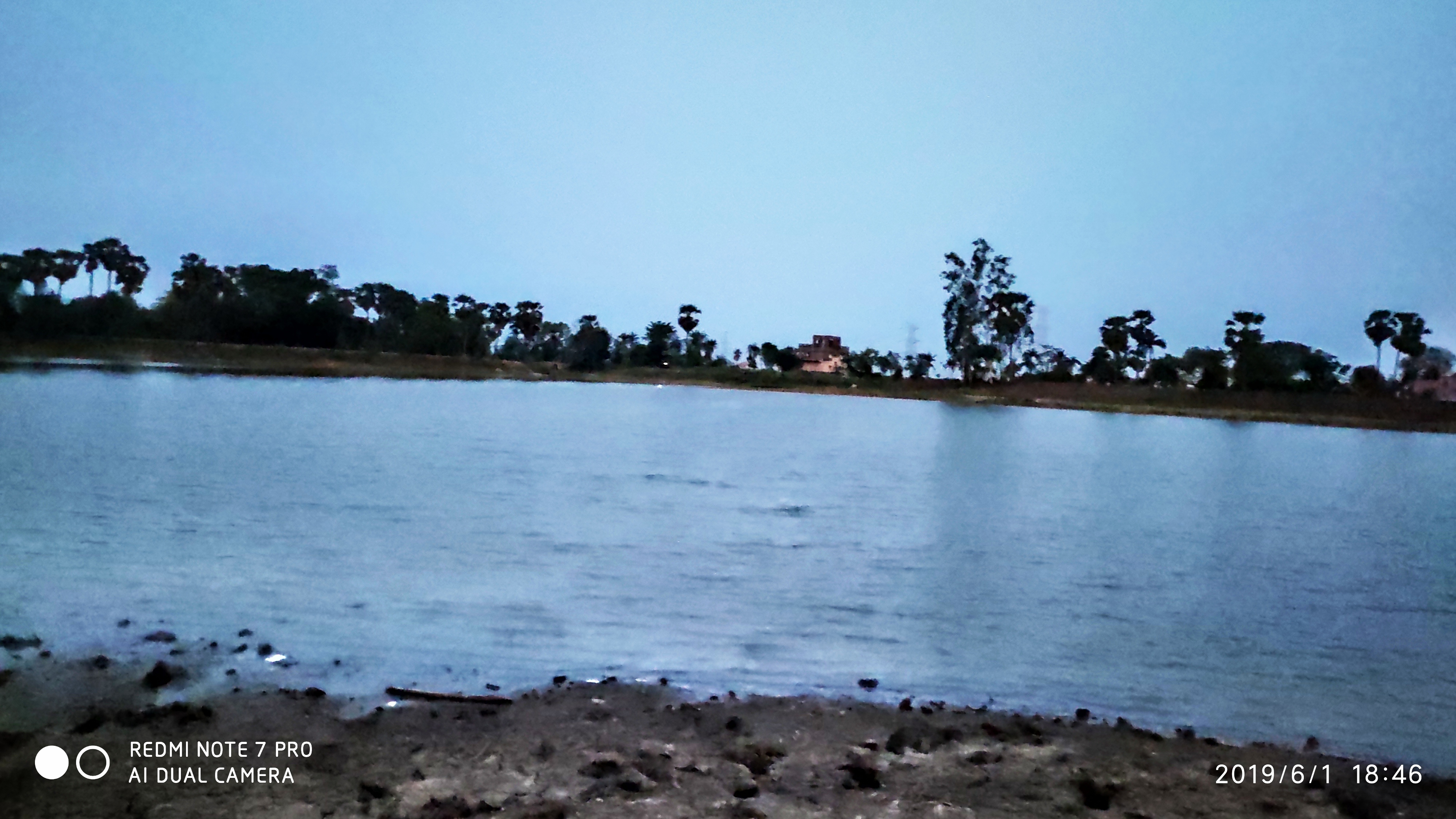
Baurisole Boro Bandh

This village is agriculturally dependent. It is situated between 22° 59’ 32" north latitude and between 87° 03' 27" east longitude. Baurisole Boro Bandh is very important for the irrigation system in agriculture.
