= Ledisol =

- Census Town
- Location in West Bengal, India Ledisol (India)
- Coordinates: 22.9816°N 86.8634°E
- Country: India
- State: West Bengal
- District: Bankura

Area
  - Total: 1.405 km^{2} (0.542 sq mi)

Population (2011)
  - Total: 5,056
  - Density: 3,599/km^{2} (9,320/sq mi)

Languages*
  - Official: Bengali, Santali, English
- Time zone: UTC+5:30 (IST)
- PIN: 722140
- Telephone/STD code: 03243
- Lok Sabha constituency: Bankura
- Vidhan Sabha constituency: Ranibandh
- Website: bankura.gov.in

Ledisol is a census town in the Khatra CD block in the Khatra subdivision of the Bankura district in the state of West Bengal, India.

== Geography ==
Places in Khatra subdivision in Bankura district
CT: census town, R: rural/ urban centre, C: craft centre, T: ancient/ temple centre
Owing to space constraints in the small map, the actual locations in a larger map may vary slightly

=== Location ===
Ledisol is located at 22.9816°N 86.8634°E.

=== Area overview ===
The map alongside shows the Khatra subdivision of Bankura district. Physiographically, this area is having uneven lands with hard rocks. In the Khatra CD block area there are some low hills. The Kangsabati project reservoir is prominently visible in the map. The subdued patches of shaded area in the map show forested areas It is an almost fully rural area.

Note: The map alongside presents some of the notable locations in the subdivision. All places marked in the map are linked in the larger full screen map.

== Demographics ==
According to the 2011 Census of India, Ledisol had a total population of 5,056, of which 2,582 (51%) were males and 2,474 (49%) were females. There were 447 persons in the age range of 0–6 years. The total number of literate persons in Ledisol was 4,235 (91.89% of the population over 6 years).

.*For language details see Khatra (community development block)#Language and religion

== Infrastructure ==
According to the District Census Handbook 2011, Bankura, Ledisol covered an area of 1.405 km^{2}. Among the civic amenities, it had 13.5 km of roads, the protected water supply involved tap water from treated sources, tubewell/ borewell. It had 670 domestic electric connections, 272 road lighting points. Among the medical facilities it had 1 dispensary/ health centre, 1 family welfare centre, 1 maternity and child welfare centre, 4 medicine shops. Among the educational facilities it had were 2 primary schools, 1 middle school, 1 secondary school, 1 senior secondary school, the nearest general degree college at Supur 4 km away. It had 2 non-formal education centres (Sarva Shiksha Abhiyan). Among the social cultural and recreational facilities, it had 1 cinema theatre, 1 auditorium/ community hall, 1 public library, 1 reading room. The three most important commodities it manufactured were rice, wheat, mustard oil. It had the branch of 1 cooperative bank.
