= Atbaichandi =

- Village
- Location in West Bengal, India Atbaichandi (India)
- Coordinates: 23.1297°N 86.9883°E
- Country: India
- State: West Bengal
- District: Bankura

Population (2011)
  - Total: 1,310

Languages
  - Official: Bengali, English
- Time zone: UTC+5:30 (IST)
- PIN: 722136
- Telephone/STD code: 03243
- Lok Sabha constituency: Bankura
- Vidhan Sabha constituency: Taldangra
- Website: bankura.gov.in

Atbaichandi is a village in the Indpur CD block in the Khatra subdivision of the Bankura district in the state of West Bengal, India.

== Geography ==
Places in Khatra subdivision in Bankura district
CT: census town, R: rural/ urban centre, C: craft centre, T: ancient/ temple centre
Owing to space constraints in the small map, the actual locations in a larger map may vary slightly

=== Location ===
Atbaichandi is located at 23.1297°N 86.9883°E.

Note: The map alongside presents some of the notable locations in the subdivision. All places marked in the map are linked in the larger full screen map.

== Demographics ==
According to the 2011 Census of India, Atbaichandi had a total population of 1,310, of which 658 (50%) were males and 652 (50%) were females. There were 190 persons in the age range of 0–6 years. The total number of literate persons in Atbaichandi was 693 (61.88% of the population over 6 years).

== Culture ==
David J. McCutchion says that old ruins, images and tumbled remains of old structures spread across Mallabhum, e.g. the three temples at Atbaichandi in Indpur PS, stand as evidence of extensive temple-building by the Rajas of Bishnupur. Although subject to occasional incursions, "their territory was largely beyond the sphere of Muslim influence."

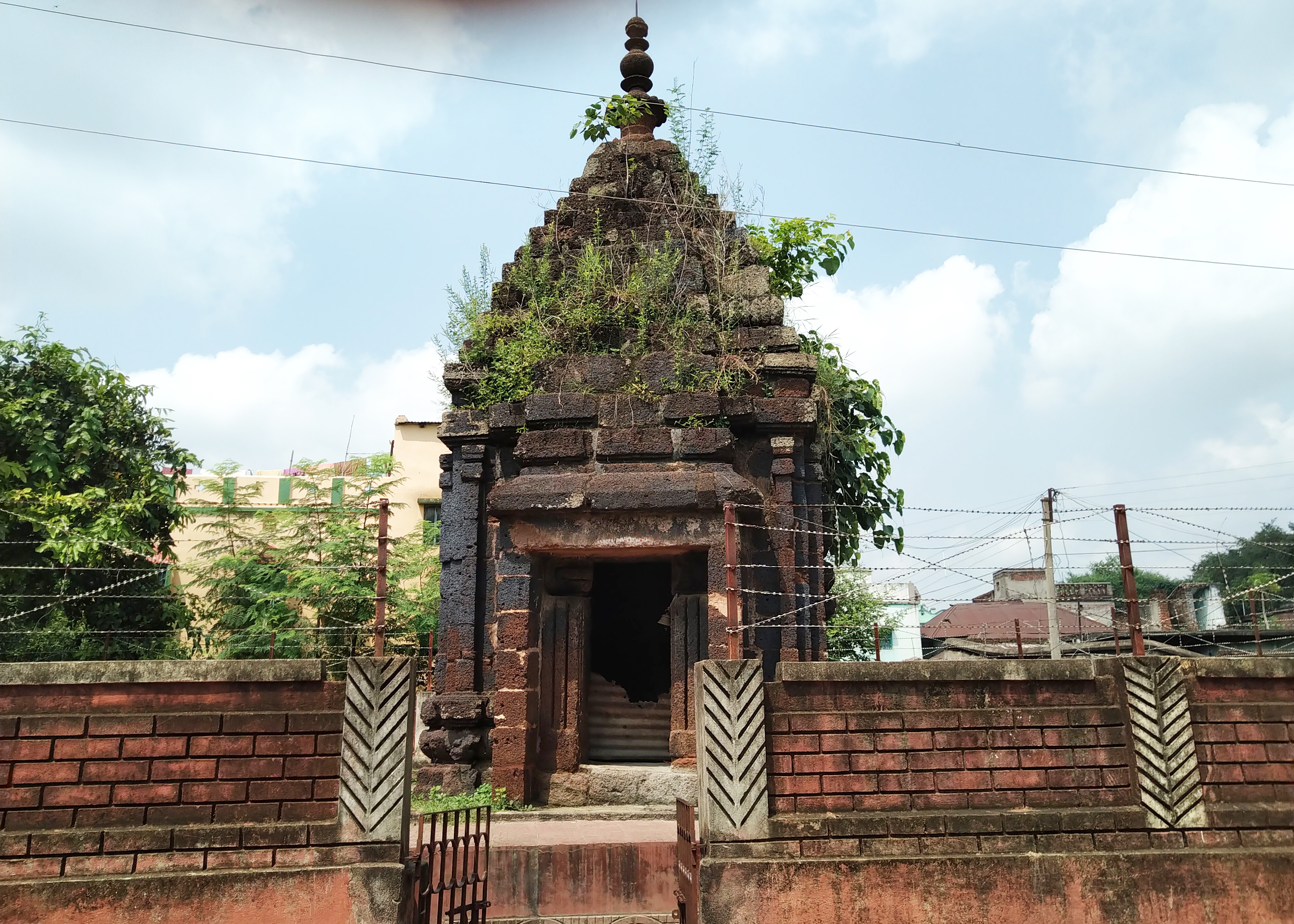
Basuli temple at Atbaichandi

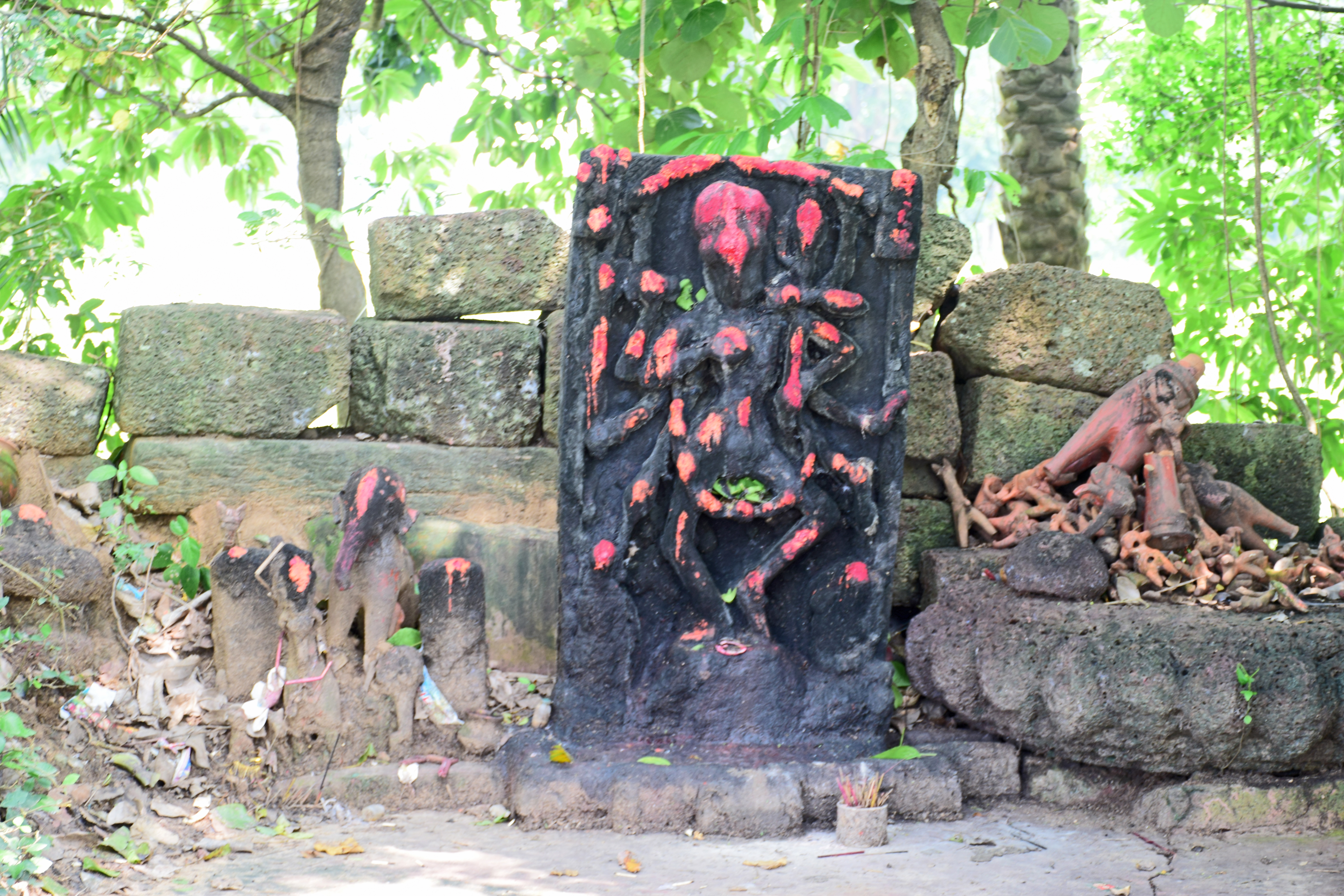
Atbaichandi idol in what remains of a temple

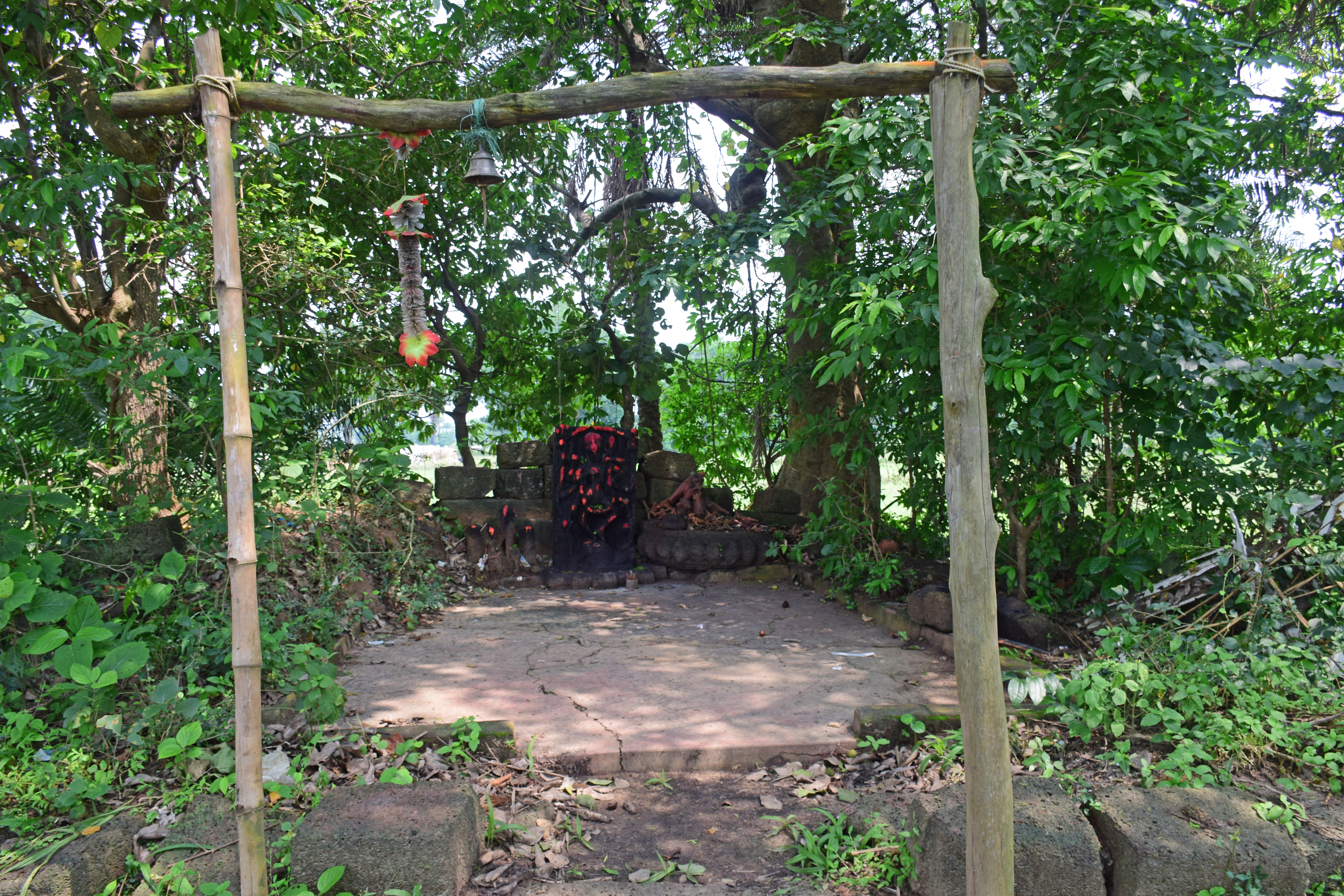
Atbaichandi idol in what remains of a temple
