= Sarenga, Bankura (community development block) =

Sarenga
- Community development block
- Coordinates: 22.7667°N 87.0333°E
- Country: India
- State: West Bengal
- District: Bankura

Government
  - Type: Representative democracy

Area
  - Total: 228.07 km^{2} (88.06 sq mi)
- Elevation: 79 m (259 ft)

Population (2011)
  - Total: 106,808
  - Density: 468.31/km^{2} (1,212.9/sq mi)

Languages
  - Official: Bengali, Santali, English
- Time zone: UTC+5:30 (IST)
- PIN: 722150 (Sarenga)
- Telephone/STD code: 03243
- ISO 3166 code: IN-WB
- Vehicle registration: WB-67, WB-68
- Literacy: 74.25%
- Lok Sabha constituency: Bankura
- Vidhan Sabha constituency: Raipur

Sarenga is a community development block (CD block) that forms an administrative division in the Khatra subdivision of the Bankura district in the Indian state of West Bengal.

== History ==
=== From Bishnupur kingdom to the British Raj ===
From around the 7th century AD till around the advent of British rule, for around a millennium, history of Bankura district is identical with the rise and fall of the Hindu Rajas of Bishnupur. The Bishnupur Rajas, who were at the summit of their fortunes towards the end of the 17th century, started declining in the first half of the 18th century. First, the Maharaja of Burdwan seized the Fatehpur Mahal, and then the Maratha invasions laid waste their country.

Bishnupur was ceded to the British with the rest of Burdwan chakla in 1760. In 1787, Bishnupur was united with Birbhum to form a separate administrative unit. In 1793 it was transferred to the Burdwan collectorate. In 1879, the district acquired its present shape with the thanas of Khatra and Raipur and the outpost of Simplapal being transferred from Manbhum, and the thanas of Sonamukhi, Kotulpur and Indas being retransferred from Burdwan. However, it was known for sometime as West Burdwan and in 1881 came to be known as Bankura district.

=== Red corridor ===
106 districts spanning 10 states across India, described as being part of the Left Wing Extremism activities, constitutes the Red corridor. In West Bengal the districts of Paschim Medinipur, Bankura, Purulia and Birbhum are part of the Red corridor. However, as of July 2016, there had been no reported incidents of Maoist related activities from these districts for the previous 4 years.

The CPI (Maoist) extremism which started in the district in the mid-nineties was mainly concentrated in five police station areas of Khatra subdivision – Sarenga, Barikul, Ranibandh, Raipur and Simlapal. They also functioned across the adjoining areas of Paschim Medinipur and Purulia districts.

The Lalgarh movement, which started attracting attention after the failed assassination attempt on Buddhadeb Bhattacharjee, then chief minister of West Bengal, in the Salboni area of Paschim Medinipur district, on 2 November 2008 and the police action that followed, had also spread over to these areas. The movement was not just a political struggle but an armed struggle that concurrently took the look of a social struggle. A large number of CPI (M) activists were killed. Although the epi-centre of the movement was Lalgarh, it was spread across 19 police stations in three adjoining districts – Paschim Medinipur, Bankura and Purulia, all thickly forested and near the border with Jharkhand. The deployment of CRPF and other forces started on 11 June 2009. The movement came to an end after the 2011 state assembly elections and change of government in West Bengal. The death of Kishenji, the Maoist commander, on 24 November 2011 was the last major landmark.

== Geography ==
Map of Bankura District showing CD blocks and municipalities

Sarenga is located at 22°46′00″N 87°02′00″E.

Sarenga CD block is located in the south-eastern part of the district and belongs to the hard rock area.

Sarenga CD block is bounded by Simlapal CD block on the north, Garhbeta II CD block, in Paschim Medinipur district, on the east, Binpur I and Binpur II CD blocks, in Paschim Medinipur, on the south and Raipur CD block on the west.

Sarenga CD block has an area of 223.78 km^{2}. It has 1 panchayat samity, 6 gram panchayats, 80 gram sansads (village councils), 166 mouzas and 153 inhabited villages. Sarenga police station serves this block. Headquarters of this CD block is at Sarenga.

=== Gram panchayats ===
Gram panchayats of Sarenga block are: Sarenga, Bikrampur, Chiltore, Gargaria, Goalbari and Neturpur.

== Demographics ==
=== Population ===
According to the 2011 Census of India, Sarenga CD block had a total population of 106,808, all of which were rural. There were 54,168 (51%) males and 52,640 (49%) females. Population in the age range of 0 to 6 years was 12,408. Scheduled Castes numbered 31,194 (29.21%) and Scheduled Tribes numbered 20,407 (19.11%).

According to the 2001 census, Sarenga block had a total population of 95,095, out of which 48,752 were males and 46,343 were females. Sarenga block registered a negative population growth of -11.88 per cent during the 1991-2001 decade. Decadal growth for the district was 13.79 per cent. Decadal growth in West Bengal was 17.84 per cent.

Large villages (with 4,000+ population) in Sarenga CD block are (2011 census figures in brackets): Sarenga (5,888).

Other villages in Sarenga CD block are (2011 census figures in brackets): Goalbari (1,752), Neturpur (1,151), Chiltor (1,011), Bikrampur (1,688) and Garagrya (1,922).

=== Literacy ===
According to the 2011 census, the total number of literates in Sarenga CD block was 70,096 (74.25% of the population over 6 years) out of which males numbered 40,427 (84.63% of the male population over 6 years) and females numbered 29,669 (63.62%) of the female population over 6 years). The gender disparity (the difference between female and male literacy rates) was 21.01%.

See also – List of West Bengal districts ranked by literacy rate

Literacy in CD blocks of
Bankura district
Bankura Sadar subdivision
Saltora – 61.45%
Mejia – 66.83%
Gangajalghati – 68.11%
Chhatna – 65.73%
Bankura I – 68.74%
Bankura II – 73.59%
Barjora – 71.67%
Onda – 65.82%
Bishnupur subdivision
Indas – 71.70%
Joypur – 74.57%
Patrasayer – 64.8%
Kotulpur – 78.01%
Sonamukhi – 66.16%
Bishnupur – 66.30%
Khatra subdivision
Indpur – 67.42%
Ranibandh – 68.53%
Khatra – 72.18%
Hirbandh – 64.18%
Raipur – 71.33%
Sarenga – 74.25%
Simlapal – 68.44%
Taldangra – 70.87%
2011 Census: CD Block Wise

Primary Census Abstract Data

=== Language and religion ===
Religion in Sarenga CD block (2011)
Hinduism	78.21%
Other (tribal religion)	19.84%
Christianity	1.29%
Islam	0.46%
Other or not stated	0.20%

In the 2011 census Hindus numbered 83,534 and formed 78.21% of the population in Sarenga CD block. Christians numbered 1,382 and formed 1.29% of the population. Muslims numbered 489 and formed 0.46% of the population. Others numbered 21,403 and formed 20.04% of the population. Others include Addi Bassi, Marang Boro, Santal, Saranath, Sari Dharma, Sarna, Alchchi, Bidin, Sant, Saevdharm, Seran, Saran, Sarin, Kheria, and other religious communities. In 2001, Hindus were 76.60%, Muslims 0.50%, Christians 1.27% and tribal religions 21.52% of the population respectively.

Languages of Sarenga CD block (2011)
1. Bengali (79.8%)
2. Santali (17.2%)
3. Kurmali (2.91%)
4. Others (0.11%)

At the time of the 2011 census, 79.81% of the population spoke Bengali, 17.17% Santali and 2.91% Kurmali as their first language.

== Rural poverty ==
In Sarenga CD block 41.57% families were living below poverty line in 2007. According to the Rural Household Survey in 2005, 28.87% of the total number of families were BPL families in the Bankura district.

Migration has been observed in the following CD blocks of Bankura district: Bankura I, Chhatna, Saltora, Indpur, Ranibandh, Hirbandh, Khatra, Raipur and Sarenga. Although authentic figures are not available, a sample survey has been done. According to the sample survey, around 54.5% to 85.4% of the families on an average migrate from these blocks. Another study shows that around 23% of the people from the under-privileged blocks in the western and southern Bankura migrate. Those migrating belong mostly to the SC or ST population. They migrate for periods varying from 15 days to 6/8 months. Most people migrate to meet their food deficit and go to Bardhaman and Hooghly districts but some go to Gujarat and Maharashtra as construction labour.

== Economy ==
=== Livelihood ===
Livelihood
in Sarenga CD block
1. Cultivators (22.4%)
2. Agricultural labourers (57.2%)
3. Household industries (3.21%)
4. Other Workers (17.2%)

In the Sarenga CD block in 2011, among the class of total workers, cultivators numbered 10,061 and formed 22.35%, agricultural labourers numbered 25,769 and formed 57.25%, household industry workers numbered 1,443 and formed 3.21% and other workers numbered 7,742 and formed 17.20%. Total workers numbered 45,015 and formed 57.85% of the total population, and non-workers numbered 61,793 and formed 54.35% of the population.

Note: In the census records a person is considered a cultivator, if the person is engaged in cultivation/ supervision of land owned by self/government/institution. When a person who works on another person's land for wages in cash or kind or share, is regarded as an agricultural labourer. Household industry is defined as an industry conducted by one or more members of the family within the household or village, and one that does not qualify for registration as a factory under the Factories Act. Other workers are persons engaged in some economic activity other than cultivators, agricultural labourers and household workers. It includes factory, mining, plantation, transport and office workers, those engaged in business and commerce, teachers, entertainment artistes and so on.

=== Infrastructure ===
There are 197 inhabited villages in the Raipur CD block, as per the District Census Handbook, Bankura, 2011. 100% villages have power supply. 192 villages (97.46%) have drinking water supply. 25 villages (12.69%) have post offices. 132 villages (67.01%) have telephones (including landlines, public call offices and mobile phones). 59 villages (29.95%) have pucca (paved) approach roads and 69 villages (35.03%) have transport communication (includes bus service, rail facility and navigable waterways). 17 villages (8.63%) have agricultural credit societies and 5 villages (2.54%) have banks.

=== Agriculture ===
There were 51 fertiliser depots, 8 seed stores and 39 fair price shops in the Sarenga CD block.

In 2013–14, persons engaged in agriculture in Sarenga CD block could be classified as follows: bargadars 2.91%, patta (document) holders 9.07%, small farmers (possessing land between 1 and 2 hectares) 9.31%, marginal farmers (possessing land up to 1 hectare) 27.36% and agricultural labourers 51.35%.

In 2003-04 net area sown Sarenga CD block was 12,947 hectares and the area in which more than one crop was grown was 10,601 hectares.

In 2013–14, the total area irrigated in Sarenga CD block was 15,370 hectares, out of which 9,723 hectares was by canal water, 950 hectares by tank water, 700 hectares by river lift irrigation, 2,905 hectares by shallow tubewell, 17 hectares by open dug wells and 1,075 hectares by other methods.

In 2013–14, Sarenga CD block produced 102,823 tonnes of Aman paddy, the main winter crop, from 36,541 hectares, 308 tonnes of wheat from 142 hectares and 22,557,000 tonnes of potatoes from 1,310 hectares. It also produced pulses and mustard.

=== Handloom and pottery industries ===
The handloom industry engages the largest number of persons in the non farm sector and hence is important in Bankura district. The handloom industry is well established in all the CD Blocks of the district and includes the famous Baluchari saris. In 2004-05 Sarenga CD Block had 305 looms in operation.

Bankura district is famous for the artistic excellence of its pottery products that include the famous Bankura horse. The range of pottery products is categorised as follows: domestic utilities, terracota and other decorative items and roofing tiles and other heavy pottery items. The terracotta and decorative items include horse, elephant, tiger, ox, flower vase, Mansa Saj, ash-tray and other items of religious use. These are produced in the following CD blocks: Taldangra, Sonamukhi, Sarenga, Bankura I and Bankura II. Around 3,200 families were involved in pottery making in the district in 2002. 107 families were involved in Sarenga CD block.

=== Banking ===
In 2013–14, Sarenga CD block had offices of 3 commercial banks and 3 gramin banks.

=== Backward Regions Grant Fund ===
The Bankura district is listed as a backward region and receives financial support from the Backward Regions Grant Fund. The fund, created by the Government of India, is designed to redress regional imbalances in development. As of 2012, 272 districts across the country were listed under this scheme. The list includes 11 districts of West Bengal.

== Transport ==
In 2013–14, Sarenga CD Block had 6 originating/ terminating bus routes. The nearest railway station is 38 km from the CD Block headquarters.

State Highway 4 running from Jhalda (in Purulia district) to Digha foreshore (in Purba Medinipur district) and State Highway 8, running from Durgapur to Nayagram, pass through this CD block.

== Education ==
In 2013–14, Sarenga CD block had 115 primary schools with 9,179 students, 7 middle schools with 1,219 students, 3 high schools with 1,434 students and 13 higher secondary schools with 10,469 students. Sarenga CD block had 1 general college with 3,410 students, 2 professional/ technical institutions with 116 students and 111 institutions for special and non-formal education with 4,418 students.

See also – Education in India

According to the 2011 census, in the Raipur CD block, among the 197 inhabited villages, 25 villages did not have a school, 47 villages had two or more primary schools, 52 villages had at least 1 primary and 1 middle school and 29 villages had at least 1 middle and 1 secondary school.

== Healthcare ==
In 2014, Sarenga CD block had 1 rural hospital and 1 primary health centres with total 202 beds and 6 doctors. It had 17 family welfare sub centres and 1 family welfare centre. 6,011 patients were treated indoor and 114,455 patients were treated outdoor in the hospitals, health centres and subcentres of the CD block.

Sarenga Rural Hospital, with 30 beds at Krishnapur, is the major government medical facility in the Sarenga CD block. There are primary health centres at Dumurtor (Tikarpara) Sarenga (with 6 beds), Krishnapur (Dumurtor) (with 10 beds).
