= Indpur (community development block) =

- Community development block
- Coordinates: 23.1667°N 86.9333°E
- Country: India
- State: West Bengal
- District: Bankura

Government
  - Type: Representative democracy

Area
  - Total: 300.20 km^{2} (115.91 sq mi)
- Elevation: 118 m (387 ft)

Population (2011)
  - Total: 156,522
  - Density: 521.39/km^{2} (1,350.4/sq mi)

Languages
  - Official: Bengali, English
- Time zone: UTC+5:30 (IST)
- PIN: 722136 (Indpur); 722121 (Bheduasole)
- Telephone/STD code: 03243
- ISO 3166 code: IN-WB
- Vehicle registration: WB-67, WB-68
- Literacy: 67.42%
- Lok Sabha constituency: Bankura
- Vidhan Sabha constituency: Chhatna, Taldangra
- Website: bankura.gov.in

Indpur is a community development block (CD block) that forms an administrative division in the Khatra subdivision of the Bankura district in the Indian state of West Bengal.

== History ==
=== From Bishnupur kingdom to the British Raj ===
From around the 7th century AD till around the advent of British rule, for around a millennium, history of Bankura district is identical with the rise and fall of the Hindu Rajas of Bishnupur. The Bishnupur Rajas, who were at the summit of their fortunes towards the end of the 17th century, started declining in the first half of the 18th century. First, the Maharaja of Burdwan seized the Fatehpur Mahal, and then the Maratha invasions laid waste their country.

Bishnupur was ceded to the British with the rest of Burdwan chakla in 1760. In 1787, Bishnupur was united with Birbhum to form a separate administrative unit. In 1793 it was transferred to the Burdwan collectorate. In 1879, the district acquired its present shape with the thanas of Khatra and Raipur and the outpost of Simplapal being transferred from Manbhum, and the thanas of Sonamukhi, Kotulpur and Indas being retransferred from Burdwan. However, it was known for sometime as West Burdwan and in 1881 came to be known as Bankura district.

== Geography ==
Map of Bankura District showing CD blocks and municipalities

Indpur is located at 23.1667°N 86.9333°E. It has an average elevation of 118 m (387 ft).

Indpur CD block spreads over from the central parts of the district to the western border with Purulia district. It belongs to the uneven lands/ hard ring rock area. The soil is laterite red and hard beds are covered with scrub jungle and sal wood.

Indpur CD block is bounded by Chhatna and Bankura I CD blocks on the north, Onda and Taldangra CD blocks on the east, Khatra and Hirbandh CD Blocks on the south and Puncha CD block, in Purulia district, on the west.

Indpur CD block has an area of 302.60 km^{2}. It has 1 panchayat samity, 7 gram panchayats, 112 gram sansads (village councils), 222 mouzas and 198 inhabited villages. Indpur police station serves this block. Headquarters of this CD block is at Indpur.

Gram panchayats of Indpur block/ panchayat samiti are: Bheduasole, Brahmandiha, Brajarajpur, Gourbazar, Hatgram, Indpur and Raghunathpur.

== Demographics ==
=== Population ===
According to the 2011 Census of India Indpur CD block had a total population of 156,522, all of which were rural. There were 80,556 (51%) males and 75,966 (49%) females. Population in the age range of 0 to 6 years was 19,430. Scheduled Castes numbered 63,532 (40.59%) and Scheduled Tribes numbered 15,003 (9.59%).

In the 2001 census, Indpur community development bloc had a total population of 137,800 of which 70,876 were males and 66,924 were females. Decadal growth for the period 1991-2001 was 10.15% for Indpur, against 13.79% in Bankura district. Decadal growth in West Bengal was 17.84 per cent.

Large villages (with 4,000+ population) in Indpur CD block are (2011 census figures in brackets): Gaurbazar (4,349).

Other villages in Indpur CD block are (2011 census figures in brackets): Indpur (2,573), Bheduasole (1,581), Brahmandiha (2,933), Hatgram (3,080), Raghunathpur (454), Brajarajpur (1,577), Atbaichandi (1,310).

=== Literacy ===
According to the 2011 census the total number of literates in Indpur CD block was 92,434 (67.42% of the population over 6 years) out of which males numbered 56,305 (79.87% of the male population over 6 years) and females numbered 36,829 (55.30%) of the female population over 6 years). The gender disparity (the difference between female and male literacy rates) was 24.57%.

See also – List of West Bengal districts ranked by literacy rate

Literacy in CD blocks of
Bankura district
Bankura Sadar subdivision
Saltora – 61.45%
Mejia – 66.83%
Gangajalghati – 68.11%
Chhatna – 65.73%
Bankura I – 68.74%
Bankura II – 73.59%
Barjora – 71.67%
Onda – 65.82%
Bishnupur subdivision
Indas – 71.70%
Joypur – 74.57%
Patrasayer – 64.8%
Kotulpur – 78.01%
Sonamukhi – 66.16%
Bishnupur – 66.30%
Khatra subdivision
Indpur – 67.42%
Ranibandh – 68.53%
Khatra – 72.18%
Hirbandh – 64.18%
Raipur – 71.33%
Sarenga – 74.25%
Simlapal – 68.44%
Taldangra – 70.87%
2011 Census: CD Block Wise

Primary Census Abstract Data

=== Language and religion ===
Religion in Indpur CD block (2011)
Hinduism	90.15%
Islam	5.68%
Other (tribal religion)	3.98%
Other or not stated	0.19%

In the 2011 census Hindus numbered 141,112 and formed 90.15% of the population in Indpur CD block. Muslims numbered 8,874 and formed 5.68% of the population. Others numbered 6,536 and formed 4.17% of the population. Others include Addi Bassi, Marang Boro, Santal, Saranath, Sari Dharma, Sarna, Alchchi, Bidin, Sant, Saevdharm, Seran, Saran, Sarin, Kheria, and other religious communities. In 2001, Hindus were 90.81%, Muslims 5.00% and tribal religions 4.09% of the population respectively.

Languages of Indpur CD block (2011)
1. Bengali (94.8%)
2. Santali (5.19%)
3. Others (0.03%)

At the time of the 2011 census, 94.78% of the population spoke Bengali and 5.19% Santali as their first language.

== Rural poverty ==
In Indpur CD block 48.19% families were living below poverty line in 2007. According to the Rural Household Survey in 2005, 28.87% of the total number of families were BPL families in the Bankura district.

Migration has been observed in the following CD blocks of Bankura district: Bankura I, Chhatna, Saltora, Indpur, Ranibandh, Hirbandh, Khatra, Raipur and Sarenga. Although authentic figures are not available, a sample survey has been done. According to the sample survey, around 54.5% to 85.4% of the families on an average migrate from these blocks. Another study shows that around 23% of the people from the under-privileged blocks in the western and southern Bankura migrate. Those migrating belong mostly to the SC or ST population. They migrate for periods varying from 15 days to 6/8 months. Most people migrate to meet their food deficit and go to Bardhaman and Hooghly districts but some go to Gujarat and Maharashtra as construction labour.

== Economy ==
=== Livelihood ===
Livelihood
in Indpur CD block
1. Cultivators (20.2%)
2. Agricultural labourers (53.5%)
3. Household industries (3.31%)
4. Other Workers (22.9%)

In the Indpur CD block in 2011, among the class of total workers, cultivators numbered 12,834 and formed 20.24%, agricultural labourers numbered 33,939 and formed 53.53%, household industry workers numbered 2,100 and formed 3.31% and other workers numbered 14,530 and formed 22.92%. Total workers numbered 63,403 and formed 40.51% of the total population, and non-workers numbered 93,119 and formed 59.49% of the population.

Note: In the census records a person is considered a cultivator, if the person is engaged in cultivation/ supervision of land owned by self/government/institution. When a person who works on another person's land for wages in cash or kind or share, is regarded as an agricultural labourer. Household industry is defined as an industry conducted by one or more members of the family within the household or village, and one that does not qualify for registration as a factory under the Factories Act. Other workers are persons engaged in some economic activity other than cultivators, agricultural labourers and household workers. It includes factory, mining, plantation, transport and office workers, those engaged in business and commerce, teachers, entertainment artistes and so on.

=== Infrastructure ===
There are 198 inhabited villages in the Indpur CD block, as per the District Census Handbook, Bankura, 2011. 100% villages have power supply.Not 100% villages have Purified drinking water supply. 45 villages (22.73%) have post offices. 175 villages (88.38%) have telephones (including landlines, public call offices and mobile phones). 60 villages (33.30%) have pucca (paved) approach roads and 85 villages (42.93%) have transport communication (includes bus service, rail facility and navigable waterways). Four villages (2.02%) have agricultural credit societies and six villages (3.03%) have banks.

=== Agriculture ===
There were 38 fertiliser depots, nine seed stores and 59 fair price shops in the CD Block.

In 2013-14, persons engaged in agriculture in Indpur CD block could be classified as follows: bargadars 2.82%, patta (document) holders 6.88%, small farmers (possessing land between one and two hectares) 10.11%, marginal farmers (possessing land up to 1 hectare) 25.60% and agricultural labourers 54.59%.

In 2003-04 net area sown in Indpur CD block was 16,490 hectares and the area in which more than one crop was grown was 2,327 hectares.

In 2013-14, the total area irrigated in Indpur CD block was 6,290 hectares, out of which 3,570 hectares was by canal water, 850 hectares by tank water, 1,800 hectares by river lift irrigation, 40 hectares by open dug wells and 30 hectares by other methods.

In 2013-14, Indpur CD block produced 3,573 tonnes of Aman paddy, the main winter crop, from 1,611 hectares, 284 tonnes of wheat from 128 hectares and 182 tonnes of potatoes from 7 hectares. It also produced pulses and mustard.

=== Handloom and pottery industries ===
The handloom industry engages the largest number of persons in the non farm sector and hence is important in Bankura district. The handloom industry is well established in all the CD Blocks of the district and includes the famous Baluchari saris. In 2004-05 Indpur CD block had 1,665 looms in operation.

Bankura district is famous for the artistic excellence of its pottery products that include the famous Bankura horse. The range of pottery products is categorised as follows: domestic utilities, terracota and other decorative items and roofing tiles and other heavy pottery items. Around 3,200 families were involved in pottery making in the district in 2002. 144 families were involved in Indpur CD block.

=== Banking ===
In 2013-14, Indpur CD block had offices of three commercial banks and four gramin banks.

=== Backward Regions Grant Fund ===
The Bankura district is listed as a backward region and receives financial support from the Backward Regions Grant Fund. The fund, created by the Government of India, is designed to redress regional imbalances in development. As of 2012, 272 districts across the country were listed under this scheme. The list includes 11 districts of West Bengal.

== Transport ==
In 2013-14, Indpur CD block was served by seven bus routes. The nearest railway station is 15 km from the CD block headquarters.

The Kharagpur-Bankura-Adra line of South Eastern Railway passes through this CD block. There is a station at Bheduasol railway station.

State Highway 2 running from Bankura to Malancha (in North 24 Parganas district) passes through this CD block.

== Education ==
In 2013-14, Indpur CD block had 169 primary schools with 12,400 students, 13 middle schools with 1,741 students, 12 high schools with 7,364 students and 13 higher secondary schools with 10,695 students. Indpur CD block had one general college with 2,096 students and 254 institutions for special and non-formal education with 8,297 students. Indpur CD block had 7 mass literacy centres.

See also – Education in India

According to the 2011 census, in the Indpur CD block, among the 198 inhabited villages, 31 villages did not have a school, 43 villages had two or more primary schools, 36 villages had at least one primary and one middle school and 24 villages had at least one middle and one secondary school.

== Healthcare ==
In 2014, Indpur CD block had one rural hospital, three primary health centres and one private nursing home with total 55 beds and five doctors. It had 27 family welfare sub centres and one family welfare centre. 7,120 patients were treated indoor and 211,362 patients were treated outdoor in the hospitals, health centres and subcentres of the CD block.

Indpur Rural Hospital, with 30 beds at Indpur, is the major government medical facility in the Indpur CD block. There are primary health centres at Hatgram (with four beds), Gunnath (with six beds) and Saldiha (with 10 beds).

== See also ==
- Indpur (Vidhan Sabha constituency)
