= Sarenga, Bankura =

Sarenga
- Town
- Location in West Bengal, India Sarenga (India)
- Coordinates: 22°46′36.1″N 87°01′23.9″E
- Country: India
- State: West Bengal
- District: Bankura

Population (2011)
  - Total: 177,894

Languages*
  - Official: Bengali, Santali, English
- Time zone: UTC+5:30 (IST)
- PIN: 722150 (Sarenga)
- Telephone/STD code: 03243
- Lok Sabha constituency: Bankura
- Vidhan Sabha constituency: Raipur
- Website: bankura.gov.in

Sarenga is a Town in the Sarenga CD block in the Khatra subdivision of the Bankura district in the state of West Bengal, India.

== Geography ==
Places in Khatra subdivision in Bankura district
CT: census town, R: rural/ urban centre, C: craft centre, T: ancient/ temple centre
Owing to space constraints in the small map, the actual locations in a larger map may vary slightly

=== Location ===
Sarenga is located at 22°46′36.1″N 87°01′23.9″E.

=== Area overview ===
The map alongside shows the Khatra subdivision of Bankura district. Physiographically, this area is having uneven lands with hard rocks. In the Khatra CD block area there are some low hills. The Kangsabati project reservoir is prominently visible in the map. The subdued patches of shaded area in the map show forested areas It is an almost fully rural area.

Note: The map alongside presents some of the notable locations in the subdivision. All places marked in the map are linked in the larger full screen map.

== Demographics ==
According to the 2011 Census of India, Sarenga had a total population of 5,888 of which 2,996 (51%) were males and 2,892 (49%) were females. Population in the age range of 0–6 years was 592. The total number of literates in Sarenga was 4,486 (84.71% of the population over 6 years).

.*For language details see Sarenga, Bankura (community development block)#Language and religion

== Civic administration ==
=== Police station ===
Sarenga police station has jurisdiction over the Sarenga CD block. The area covered is 235.68 km^{2}with a population of 95,096.

=== CD block HQ ===
The headquarters of Sarenga CD block are located at Sarenga.

== Education ==
Sarenga M.S.Bidyapith, is a Bengali-medium coeducational institution established in 1949. It has facilities for teaching from class V to class XII. The school has 4 computers, a library with 631 books and a playground.

Sarenga Girls High School, is a Bengali-medium girls only institution established in 1964. It has facilities for teaching from class V to class XII. The school has 2 computers and a library with 2,750 books.

Sarenga High School, is a Bengali-medium coeducational institution established in 1955. It has facilities for teaching from class V to class X. The school has a library with 815 books and a playground.

Pandit Raghunath Murmu Smriti Mahavidyalaya was established at Baragari in 1986. The college is affiliated to the Bankura University, It offers honours courses in Bengali, Santali, English, Sanskrit, geography, history, political science, philosophy, computer science, mathematics, physics, chemistry, economics, forestry, and general courses in science and arts. It offers post-graduate courses in Bengali, Santali, Geo-Informatics, Geography and Rural Development & Planning.

== Healthcare ==
Sarenga Rural Hospital (Sarenga Block Primary Health Centre), with 30 beds at Sarenga, is the major government medical facility in the Sarenga CD block. There are primary health centres at Dumurtor (Tikarpara) Sarenga (with 6 beds), Krishnapur (Dumurtor) (with 10 beds).
