= Simlapal =

- Census Town
- Location in West Bengal, India Simlapal (India)
- Coordinates: 22°55′21.7″N 87°04′24.2″E
- Country: India
- State: West Bengal
- District: Bankura

Area
  - Total: 4.0047 km^{2} (1.5462 sq mi)

Population (2011)
  - Total: 7,206
  - Density: 1,799/km^{2} (4,660/sq mi)

Languages*
  - Official: Bengali, Santali, English
- Time zone: UTC+5:30 (IST)
- PIN: 722151 (Simlapal)
- Telephone/STD code: 03243
- Lok Sabha constituency: Bankura
- Vidhan Sabha constituency: Taldangra

Simlapal is a census town in the Simlapal CD block in the Khatra subdivision of the Bankura district in the state of West Bengal, India.

== Geography ==
Places in Khatra subdivision in Bankura district
CT: census town, R: rural/ urban centre, C: craft centre, T: ancient/ temple centre
Owing to space constraints in the small map, the actual locations in a larger map may vary slightly

=== Location ===
Simlapal is located at 22°55′21.7″N 87°04′24.2″E.

=== Area overview ===
The map alongside shows the Khatra subdivision of Bankura district. Physiographically, this area is having uneven lands with hard rocks. In the Khatra CD block area there are some low hills. The Kangsabati project reservoir is prominently visible in the map. The subdued patches of shaded area in the map show forested areas. It is an almost fully rural area.

Note: The map alongside presents some of the notable locations in the subdivision. All places marked in the map are linked in the larger full screen map.

== Demographics ==
According to the 2011 Indian Census, Simlapal had a total population of 7,206, of which 3,693 were males and 3,513 were females. Population within the age group of 0 to 6 years was 927. The total number of literates in Simlapal was 4,374, which constituted 60.7% of the population with male literacy of 67.2% and female literacy of 53.9%. The effective literacy rate of 7+ population of Simlapal was 69.7%, of which male literacy rate was 76.8% and female literacy rate was 62.1%. The Scheduled Castes and Scheduled Tribes population was 1,457 and 143 respectively. Simlapal had 1512 households in 2011.

.*For language details see Simlapal (community development block)#Language and religion

== Civic administration ==
=== Police station ===
Simlapal police station has jurisdiction over the Simlapal CD block. The area covered is 309.27 km^{2}with a population of 127,429.

=== CD block HQ ===
The Simlapal Community Development Block headquarters located at behind Simlapal M M High School.

== Infrastructure ==
According to the District Census Handbook 2011, Bankura, Simlapal covered an area of 4.0047 km^{2}. Among the civic amenities, it had 12 km of roads with open drains, the protected water supply involved tap water from treated sources, hand pumps. It had 460 domestic electric connections, 60 road lighting points. Among the medical facilities it had 7 medicine shops. Among the educational facilities it had were 5 primary schools, 2 middle schools, 2 secondary schools, 2 senior secondary schools, the nearest general degree college at Baragari 11 km away. Among the social cultural and recreational facilities, it had 1 auditorium/ community hall, 1 public library, 1 reading room. The three most important commodities it manufactured were rice, brick, stone chips. It had the branches of 1 nationalised bank, 1 cooperative bank, 1 agricultural credit society.

== Education ==
- Pandit Raghunath Murmu Smriti Mahavidyalaya was established at Baragari in 1986. The college is affiliated to the Bankura University, It offers honours courses in Bengali, Santali, English, Sanskrit, geography, history, political science, philosophy, computer science, mathematics, physics, chemistry, economics, forestry, and general courses in science and arts. It offers post-graduate courses in Bengali, Santali, Geo-Informatics, Geography and Rural Development & Planning.
- Simlapal College of Education is a private non-aided college offering a 1-year-course leading to the Bachelor of Education degree.
- Simlapal Madan Mohan High School, is a Bengali-medium educational institution established in 1938. It has facilities for teaching from class V to class XII. The school has 25 computers, a library with 2,100 books and a playground.
- Simlapal Mangalmoyee Balika Bidyamandir, is a Bengali-medium girls only institution established in 1986. It has facilities for teaching from class V to class XII. The school has 3 computers and a library with 300 books.

== Healthcare ==
Simlapal Rural Hospital (Simlapal Block Primary Health Centre), with 30 beds at Simlapal, is the major government medical facility in the Simlapal CD block. There are primary health centres at Hatibari (Bon Dubrajpur) (with 4 beds), Lakshmisagar (Rasikpur) (with 10 beds), Arrah (with 6 beds).
