= Sonamukhi (community development block) =

- Community development block
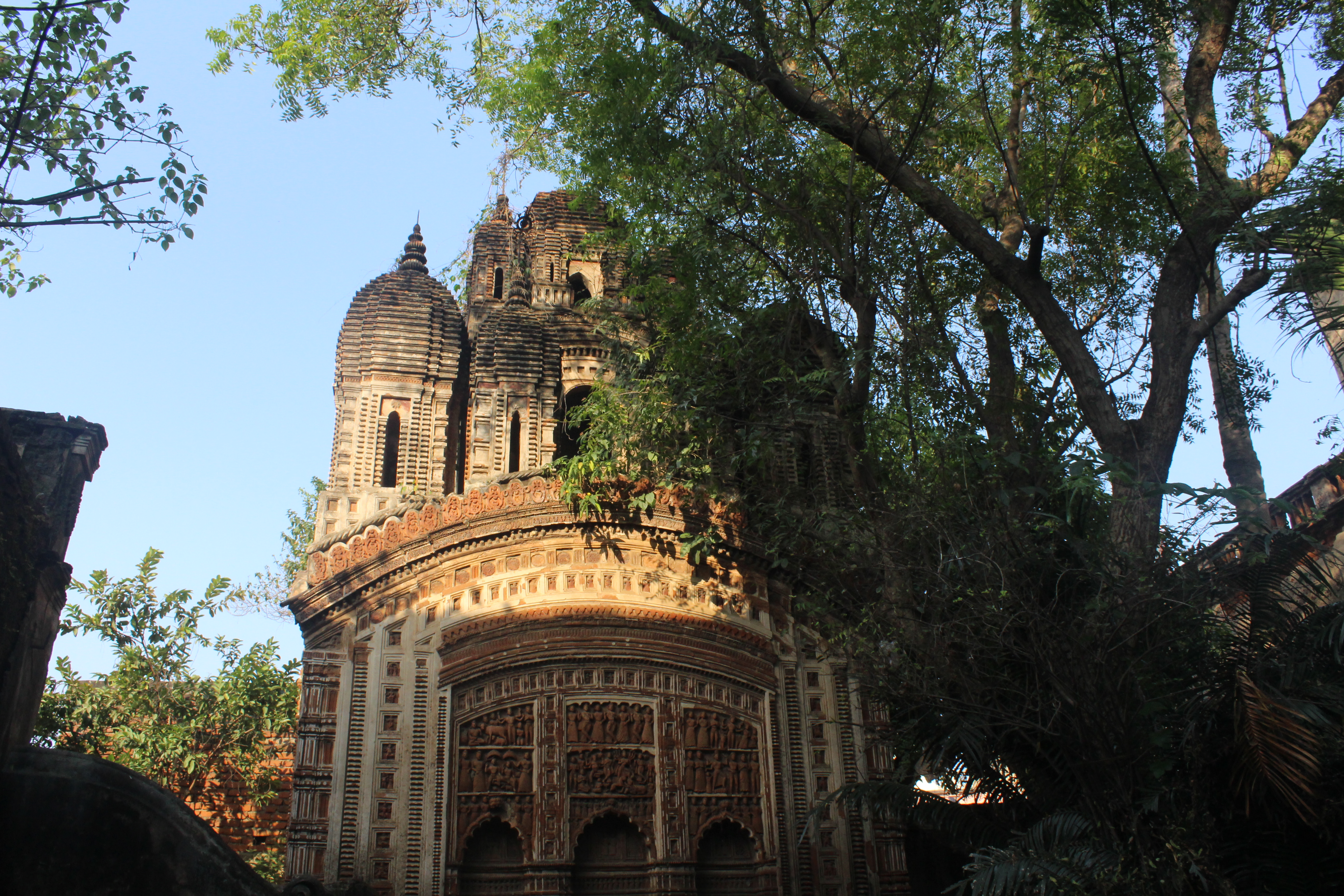
- Sridhar temple, Sonamukhi

- Coordinates: 23.3°N 87.416667°E
- Country: India
- State: West Bengal
- District: Bankura

Government
  - Type: Representative democracy

Area
  - Total: 368.30 km^{2} (142.20 sq mi)
- Elevation: 75 m (246 ft)

Population (2011)
  - Total: 158,697
  - Density: 430.89/km^{2} (1,116.0/sq mi)

Languages
  - Official: Bengali, English
- Time zone: UTC+5:30 (IST)
- PIN: 722207 (Sonamukhi); 722110 (Dhansimla)
- Telephone/STD code: 03243
- ISO 3166 code: IN-WB
- Vehicle registration: WB-67, WB-68
- Literacy: 66.16%
- Lok Sabha constituency: Bishnupur
- Vidhan Sabha constituency: Sonamukhi
- Website: bankura.gov.in

Sonamukhi is a community development block (CD block) that forms an administrative division in the Bishnupur subdivision of the Bankura district in the Indian state of West Bengal.

== History ==
=== From Bishnupur kingdom to the British Raj ===
From around the 7th century AD till around the advent of British rule, for around a millennium, history of Bankura district is identical with the rise and fall of the Hindu Rajas of Bishnupur. The Bishnupur Rajas, who were at the summit of their fortunes towards the end of the 17th century, started declining in the first half of the 18th century. First, the Maharaja of Burdwan seized the Fatehpur Mahal, and then the Maratha invasions laid waste their country.

Bishnupur was ceded to the British with the rest of Burdwan chakla in 1760. In 1787, Bishnupur was united with Birbhum to form a separate administrative unit. In 1793 it was transferred to the Burdwan collectorate. In 1879, the district acquired its present shape with the thanas of Khatra and Raipur and the outpost of Simplapal being transferred from Manbhum, and the thanas of Sonamukhi, Kotulpur and Indas being retransferred from Burdwan. However, it was known for sometime as West Burdwan and in 1881 came to be known as Bankura district.

== Geography ==
Map of Bankura District showing CD blocks and municipalities

Sonamukhi is located at 23°18′00″N 87°25′00″E.

Sonamukhi CD block is located in the eastern part of the district and belongs to the fertile low lying alluvial plains, similar to the predominating rice lands in the adjacent districts of West Bengal. Here, the eye constantly rests on wide expanses of rice fields, green in the rains but parched and dry in summer.

Sonamukhi CD block is bounded by the Kanksa and Galsi I CD blocks, in Bardhaman district across the Damodar, on the north, Patrasayer CD block on the east, Bishnupur and Onda CD blocks on the south and Gangajalghati and Barjora CD blocks on the west.

Sonamukhi CD block has an area of 378.85 km^{2}. It has 1 panchayat samity, 10 gram panchayats, 120 gram sansads (village councils), 186 mouzas and 161 inhabited villages. Sonamukhi police station serves this block. Headquarters of this CD block is at Sonamukhi.

In Bankura district 148,177 hectares or 21.5% of total geographical area of the district is forested. The forests contain the best quality sal (Shorea robusta) trees. Large forest areas exist in Sonamukhi, Joypur, Bishnupur, Khatra and Ranibandh areas.

Gram panchayats of Sonamukhi block/ panchayat samiti are: Dhansimla, Dhulai, Dihipara, Hamirhati, Kochdihi, Manikbazar, Panchal, Pearbera, Purbanabasan and Radhamohanpur.

== Demographics ==
=== Population ===
According to the 2011 Census of India, Sonamukhi CD block had a total population of 158,697, all of which were rural. There were 81,610 (51%) males and 77,087 (49%) females. Population in the age range of 0 to 6 years was 18,881. Scheduled Castes numbered 69,646 (43.89%) and Scheduled Tribes numbered 5,560 (3.50%).

According to the 2001 census, Sonamukhi block had a total population of 142,305, out of which 73,200 were males and 69,105 were females. Sonamukhi block registered a population growth of 15.07 per cent during the 1991-2001 decade. Decadal growth for the district was 15.15 per cent. Decadal growth in West Bengal was 17.84 per cent.

Large villages (with 4,000+ population) in Sonamukhi CD block are (2011 census figures in brackets): Dhan Simla (5,995).

Other villages in Sonamukhi CD block are (2011 census figures in brackets): Kochdihi (3,296), Hamirhati (955), Pear Bera (2,761), Dihipara (1,574), Dhulai (2,607), Panchal (3,266) and Manik Bazar (1,757).

=== Literacy ===
According to the 2011 census the total number of literates in Sonamukhi CD block was 92,500 (66.16% of the population over 6 years) out of which males numbered 54,107 (75.23% of the male population over 6 years) and females numbered 38,393 (56.55%) of the female population over 6 years). The gender disparity (the difference between female and male literacy rates) was 18.69%.

See also – List of West Bengal districts ranked by literacy rate

Literacy in CD blocks of
Bankura district
Bankura Sadar subdivision
Saltora – 61.45%
Mejia – 66.83%
Gangajalghati – 68.11%
Chhatna – 65.73%
Bankura I – 68.74%
Bankura II – 73.59%
Barjora – 71.67%
Onda – 65.82%
Bishnupur subdivision
Indas – 71.70%
Joypur – 74.57%
Patrasayer – 64.8%
Kotulpur – 78.01%
Sonamukhi – 66.16%
Bishnupur – 66.30%
Khatra subdivision
Indpur – 67.42%
Ranibandh – 68.53%
Khatra – 72.18%
Hirbandh – 64.18%
Raipur – 71.33%
Sarenga – 74.25%
Simlapal – 68.44%
Taldangra – 70.87%
2011 Census: CD Block Wise

Primary Census Abstract Data

=== Language and religion ===
Religion in Sonamukhi CD block (2011)
Hinduism	86.00%
Islam	12.13%
Other (tribal religion)	1.81%
Other or not stated	0.06%

In the 2011 census Hindus numbered 136,400 and formed 86.00% of the population in Sonamukhi CD block. Muslims numbered 19,236 and formed 12.13% of the population. Others numbered 3,061 and formed 1.93% of the population. Others include Addi Bassi, Marang Boro, Santal, Saranath, Sari Dharma, Sarna, Alchchi, Bidin, Sant, Saevdharm, Seran, Saran, Sarin, Kheria, and other religious communities. In 2001, Hindus were 87.36%, Muslims 11.75% and followers of tribal religion 0.83% of the population respectively.

Languages of Sonamukhi CD block (2011)
1. Bengali (95.7%)
2. Santali (3.18%)
3. Others (1.09%)

At the time of the 2011 census, 95.73% of the population spoke Bengali and 3.18% Santali as their first language.

== Rural poverty ==
In Sonamukhi CD block 44.47% families were living below poverty line in 2007. According to the Rural Household Survey in 2005, 28.87% of the total number of families were BPL families in the Bankura district.

== Economy ==
=== Livelihood ===
Livelihood
in Sonamukhi CD block
1. Cultivators (25.3%)
2. Agricultural labourers (52.9%)
3. Household industries (3.77%)
4. Other Workers (18.1%)

In the Sonamukhi CD block in 2011, among the class of total workers, cultivators numbered 18,332 and formed 25.26%, agricultural labourers numbered 38,357 and formed 52.85%, household industry workers numbered 2,737 and formed 3.77% and other workers numbered 13,155 and formed 18.12%. Total workers numbered 72,581 and formed 45.74% of the total population, and non-workers numbered 86,116 and formed 54.26% of the population.

Note: In the census records a person is considered a cultivator, if the person is engaged in cultivation/ supervision of land owned by self/government/institution. When a person who works on another person's land for wages in cash or kind or share, is regarded as an agricultural labourer. Household industry is defined as an industry conducted by one or more members of the family within the household or village, and one that does not qualify for registration as a factory under the Factories Act. Other workers are persons engaged in some economic activity other than cultivators, agricultural labourers and household workers. It includes factory, mining, plantation, transport and office workers, those engaged in business and commerce, teachers, entertainment artistes and so on.

=== Infrastructure ===
There are 161 inhabited villages in the Sonamukhi CD block, as per the District Census Handbook, Bankura, 2011. 100% villages have power supply. 158 villages (98.14%) have drinking water supply. 22 villages (13.66%) have post offices. 156 villages (96.89%) have telephones (including landlines, public call offices and mobile phones). 54 villages (33.54%) have pucca (paved) approach roads and 67 villages (41.61%) have transport communication (includes bus service, rail facility and navigable waterways). 23 villages (14.29%) have agricultural credit societies and 6 villages (3.73%) have banks.

=== Agriculture ===
There were 113 fertiliser depots, 20 seed stores and 43 fair price shops in the CD block.

In 2013–14, persons engaged in agriculture in Sonamukhi CD block could be classified as follows: bargadars 16.33%, patta (document) holders 15.97%, small farmers (possessing land between 1 and 2 hectares) 4.70%, marginal farmers (possessing land up to 1 hectare) 1.43% and agricultural labourers 61.57%.

In 2003-04 net area sown Sonamukhi CD block was 17,348 hectares and the area in which more than one crop was grown was 14,119 hectares.

In 2013–14, the total area irrigated in Sonamukhi CD block was 21,675 hectares, out of which 14,900 hectares was by canal water, 250 hectares by tank water, 580 hectares by river lift irrigation, 866 hectares by deep tube well, 4,825 hectares by shallow tubewell, 12 hectares by open dug wells and 242 hectares by other methods.

In 2013–14, Sonamukhi CD block produced 45,542 tonnes of Aman paddy, the main winter crop, from 17,209 hectares, 1,466 tonnes of Aus paddy from 662 hectares, 32,128 tonnes of Boro paddy from 11,216 hectares, 766 tonnes of wheat from 404 hectares and 29,573,000 tonnes of potatoes from 2,843 hectares. It also produced pulses and mustard.

=== Handloom and pottery industries ===
The handloom industry engages the largest number of persons in the non farm sector and hence is important in Bankura district. The handloom industry is well established in all the CD blocks of the district and includes the famous Baluchari saris. In 2004-05 Sonamukhi CD block had 79 silk looms in operation. In Sonamukhi municipal area (outside the CD block) there were 527 looms in operation.

Bankura district is famous for the artistic excellence of its pottery products that include the famous Bankura horse. The range of pottery products is categorised as follows: domestic utilities, terracota and other decorative items and roofing tiles and other heavy pottery items. Around 3,200 families were involved in pottery making in the district in 2002. 76 families were involved in Sonamukhi CD block.

=== Banking ===
In 2013–14, Sonamukhi CD block had offices of 2 commercial banks and 3 gramin banks.

=== Backward Regions Grant Fund ===
The Bankura district is listed as a backward region and receives financial support from the Backward Regions Grant Fund. The fund, created by the Government of India, is designed to redress regional imbalances in development. As of 2012, 272 districts across the country were listed under this scheme. The list includes 11 districts of West Bengal.

== Transport ==
In 2013–14, Sonamukhi CD block had 4 ferry services and 10 originating/ terminating bus routes.

DEMU services are available between Bankura and Masagram on the Bankura-Masagram line. There are stations at Dhansimla, Sonamukhi, Hamirhati, Srirampur and Brindabanpur.

State Highway 8 (West Bengal) running from Santaldih (in Purulia district) to Majhdia (in Nadia district) passes through this CD block.

== Education ==
In 2013–14, Sonamukhi CD block had 155 primary schools with 11,196 students, 14 middle schools with 1,426 students, 5 high schools with 2,290 students and 12 higher secondary schools with 10,359 students. Sonamukhi CD block had 280 institutions for special and non-formal education with 11,066 students. Sonamukhi (municipal town) had a general college outside the CD block. Sonamukhi CD block had 9 mass literacy centres.

See also – Education in India

According to the 2011 census, in the Sonamukhi CD block, among the 161 inhabited villages, 25 villages did not have a school, 37 villages had two or more primary schools, 38 villages had at least 1 primary and 1 middle school and 17 villages had at least 1 middle and 1 secondary school.

Sonamukhi College was established in 1966.

== Healthcare ==
In 2014, Sonamukhi CD block had 1 rural hospital and 4 primary health centres with total 72 beds and 5 doctors. It had 26 family welfare sub centres and 1 family welfare centre. 10,588 patients were treated indoor and 229,493 patients were treated outdoor in the hospitals, health centres and subcentres of the CD block and municipal town.

Sonamukhi Rural Hospital, with 30 beds at Sonamukhi, is the major government medical facility in the Sonamukhi CD block. There are primary health centres at Dhulai (Gopikantapur) (with 6 beds), Panchal (with 6 beds), Kundu Pushkarini (with 10 beds) and Sitaljhore (with 6 beds).
