= Simlapal (community development block) =

- Community development block
- Coordinates: 22.9227°N 87.0734°E
- Country: India
- State: West Bengal
- District: Bankura

Government
  - Type: Representative democracy

Area
  - Total: 310.15 km^{2} (119.75 sq mi)
- Elevation: 78 m (256 ft)

Population (2011)
  - Total: 143,038
  - Density: 461.19/km^{2} (1,194.5/sq mi)

Languages
  - Official: Bengali, Santali, English
- Time zone: UTC+5:30 (IST)
- PIN: 722151 (Simlapal)
- Telephone/STD code: 03243
- ISO 3166 code: IN-WB
- Vehicle registration: WB-67, WB-68
- Literacy: 68.44%
- Lok Sabha constituency: Bankura
- Vidhan Sabha constituency: Taldangra
- Website: bankura.gov.in

Simlapal is a community development block (CD block) that forms an administrative division in the Khatra subdivision of the Bankura district in the Indian state of West Bengal.

== History ==
=== From Bishnupur kingdom to the British Raj ===
From around the 7th century AD till around the advent of British rule, for around a millennium, history of Bankura district is identical with the rise and fall of the Hindu Rajas of Bishnupur. The Bishnupur Rajas, who were at the summit of their fortunes towards the end of the 17th century, started declining in the first half of the 18th century. First, the Maharaja of Burdwan seized the Fatehpur Mahal, and then the Maratha invasions laid waste their country.

Bishnupur was ceded to the British with the rest of Burdwan chakla in 1760. In 1787, Bishnupur was united with Birbhum to form a separate administrative unit. In 1793 it was transferred to the Burdwan Collectorate. In 1879, the district acquired its present shape with the thanas of Khatra and Raipur and the outpost of Simlapal being transferred from Manbhum, and the thanas of Sonamukhi, Kotulpur and Indas being retransferred from Burdwan. However, it was known for some time as West Burdwan and in 1881 came to be known as Bankura district.

=== Red corridor ===
106 districts spanning 10 states across India, described as being part of the Left wing extremism activities, constitutes the Red corridor. In West Bengal, the districts of Paschim Medinipur, Bankura, Purulia and Birbhum are part of the Red corridor. However, as of July 2016, there had been no reported incidents of Maoist related activities from these districts for the previous 4 years.

The CPI (Maoist) extremism which started in the district in the mid-nineties was mainly concentrated in five police station areas of Khatra subdivision – Sarenga, Barikul, Ranibandh, Raipur and Simlapal. They also functioned across the adjoining areas of Paschim Medinipur and Purulia districts. The Lalgarh movement, which started attracting attention after the failed assassination attempt on Buddhadeb Bhattacharjee, then chief minister of West Bengal, in the Salboni area of Paschim Medinipur district, on 2 November 2008 and the police action that followed, had also spread over to these areas. The movement was not just a political struggle but an armed struggle that concurrently took the look of a social struggle. A large number of CPI (M) activists were killed. Although the epi-center of the movement was Lalgarh, it was spread across 19 police stations in three adjoining districts – Paschim Medinipur, Bankura, and Purulia, all thickly forested and near the border with Jharkhand. The deployment of CRPF and other forces started on 11 June 2009. The movement came to an end after the 2011 state assembly elections and change of government in West Bengal. The death of Kishenji, the Maoist commander, on 24 November 2011 was the last major landmark.

== Geography ==
Map of Bankura District showing CD blocks and municipalities

Simlapal is located at 22°55′22″N 87°04′24″E.

Simlapal CD block is located in the south-eastern part of the district and belongs to the hard rock area.

Simlapal CD block is bounded by Taldangra CD block on the north, Garhbeta II CD block, in Paschim Medinipur district, on the east, Sarenga CD block on the south and Khatra CD block on the west.

Simlapal CD block has an area of 310.15 km^{2}. It has 1 panchayat samity, 7 gram panchayats, 105 gram sansads (village councils), 203 mouzas, 191 inhabited villages and 1 census town. Simlapal police station serves this block. Headquarters of this CD block is at Simlapal.

Gram panchayats of Simlapal block/ panchayat samiti are: Bikrampur, Dubrajpur, Laxmisagar, Machatora, Mandalgram, Parsola and Simlapal.

== Demographics ==
=== Population ===
According to the 2011 Census of India Simlapal CD block had a total population of 143,038, of which 135,832 were rural and 7,206 were urban. There were 73,008 (51%) males and 70,030 (49%) females. Population in the age range of 0 to 6 years was 17,125. Scheduled Castes numbered 37,738 (26.38%) and Scheduled Tribes numbered 21,277 (14.88%).

According to the 2001 census, Simlapal block had a total population of 127,429, out of which 65,328 were males and 62,101 were females. Simlapal block registered a population growth of 14.48 per cent during the 1991-2001 decade. Decadal growth for the district was 13.79 per cent. Decadal growth in West Bengal was 17.84 per cent.

Census Towns in Simlapal CD block are (2011 census figures in brackets): Simlapal (7,200).

Large villages (with 4,000+ population) in Simlapal CD block are (2011 census figures in brackets): Lakshmisagar (5,304).

Other villages in Simlapal CD block are (2011 census figures in brackets): Dubrajpur (3,162), Machatora (667), Bikrampur (1,709) and Parsala (2,689).

=== Literacy ===
According to the 2011 census, the total number of literates in Simlapal CD block was 86,172 (68.44% of the population over 6 years) out of which males numbered 50,372 (78.36% of the male population over 6 years) and females numbered 35,800 (58.09%) of the female population over 6 years). The gender disparity (the difference between female and male literacy rates) was 20.28%.

See also – List of West Bengal districts ranked by literacy rate

Literacy in CD blocks of
Bankura district
Bankura Sadar subdivision
Saltora – 61.45%
Mejia – 66.83%
Gangajalghati – 68.11%
Chhatna – 65.73%
Bankura I – 68.74%
Bankura II – 73.59%
Barjora – 71.67%
Onda – 65.82%
Bishnupur subdivision
Indas – 71.70%
Joypur – 74.57%
Patrasayer – 64.8%
Kotulpur – 78.01%
Sonamukhi – 66.16%
Bishnupur – 66.30%
Khatra subdivision
Indpur – 67.42%
Ranibandh – 68.53%
Khatra – 72.18%
Hirbandh – 64.18%
Raipur – 71.33%
Sarenga – 74.25%
Simlapal – 68.44%
Taldangra – 70.87%
2011 Census: CD Block Wise

Primary Census Abstract Data

=== Language and religion ===
Religion in Simlapal CD block (2011)
Hinduism	77.26%
Other (tribal religion)	14.77%
Islam	7.74%
Other or not stated	0.23%

In the 2011 census Hindus numbered 110,512 and formed 77.26% of the population in Simlapal CD block. Muslims numbered 11,064 and formed 7.74% of the population. Others numbered 21,462 and formed 15.00% of the population. Others include Addi Bassi, Marang Boro, Santal, Saranath, Sari Dharma, Sarna, Alchchi, Bidin, Sant, Saevdharm, Seran, Saran, Sarin, Kheria, and other religious communities. In 2001, Hindus were 78.25%, Muslims 6.66% and tribal religions 14.95% of the population respectively.

Languages of Simlapal CD block (2011)
1. Bengali (83.0%)
2. Santali (12.7%)
3. Kurmali (4.29%)
4. Others (0.05%)

At the time of the 2011 census, 82.95% of the population spoke Bengali, 12.71% Santali and 4.29% Kurmali as their first language.

== Rural poverty ==
In Simlapal CD block 46.53% families were living below poverty line in 2007. According to the Rural Household Survey in 2005, 28.87% of the total number of families were BPL families in the Bankura district.

== Economy ==
=== Livelihood ===
Livelihood
in Simlapal CD block
1. Cultivators (20.8%)
2. Agricultural labourers (53.1%)
3. Household industries (4.70%)
4. Other Workers (21.4%)

In the Simlapal CD block in 2011, among the class of total workers, cultivators numbered 12,062 and formed 20.82%, agricultural labourers numbered 30,773 and formed 53.10%, household industry workers numbered 2,726 and formed 4.70% and other workers numbered 12,387 and formed 21.38%. Total workers numbered 57,948 and formed 40.51% of the total population, and non-workers numbered 85,090 and formed 59.49% of the population.

Note: In the census records a person is considered a cultivator, if the person is engaged in cultivation/ supervision of land owned by self/government/institution. When a person who works on another person's land for wages in cash or kind or share, is regarded as an agricultural labourer. Household industry is defined as an industry conducted by one or more members of the family within the household or village, and one that does not qualify for registration as a factory under the Factories Act. Other workers are persons engaged in some economic activity other than cultivators, agricultural labourers and household workers. It includes factory, mining, plantation, transport and office workers, those engaged in business and commerce, teachers, entertainment artistes and so on.

=== Infrastructure ===
There are 191 inhabited villages in the Simlapal CD block, as per the District Census Handbook, Bankura, 2011. 100% villages have power supply. 189 villages (98.95%) have drinking water supply. 22 villages (11.52%) have post offices. 164 villages (85.86%) have telephones (including landlines, public call offices and mobile phones). 62 villages (32.46%) have pucca (paved) approach roads and 65 villages (34.03%) have transport communication (includes bus service, rail facility and navigable waterways). 10 villages (5.24%) have agricultural credit societies and 6 villages (3.14%) have banks.

=== Agriculture ===
There were 59 fertiliser depots, 18 seed stores and 48 fair price shops in the CD block.

In 2013-14, persons engaged in agriculture in Simlapal CD block could be classified as follows: bargadars 5.62%, patta (document) holders 17.78%, small farmers (possessing land between 1 and 2 hectares) 5.85%, marginal farmers (possessing land up to 1 hectare) 18.27% and agricultural labourers 52.48%.

In 2003-04 net area sown Simlapal CD block was 11,282 hectares and the area in which more than one crop was grown was 10,075 hectares.

In 2013-14, the total area irrigated in Simlapal CD block was 19,144 hectares, out of which 11,853 hectares was by canal water, 1,790 hectares by tank water, 1,120 hectares by river lift irrigation, 116 hectares by deep tubewell, 2,400 hectares by shallow tubewell, 45 hectares by open dug wells and 1,820 hectares by other methods.

In 2013-14, Simlapal CD block produced 99,087 tonnes of Aman paddy, the main winter crop, from 34,047 hectares, 181 tonnes of Aus paddy from 65 hectares, 3,290 tonnes of Boro paddy from 1,239 hectares, 237 tonnes of wheat from 105 hectares and 40,671,000 tonnes of potatoes from 2,214 hectares. It also produced maize, pulses and mustard.

=== Handloom and pottery industries ===
The handloom industry engages the largest number of persons in the non-farm sector and hence is important in Bankura district. The handloom industry is well established in all the CD blocks of the district and includes the famous Baluchari saris. In 2004-05 Simlapal CD, block had 507 looms in operation.

Bankura district is famous for the artistic excellence of its pottery products that include the famous Bankura horse. The range of pottery products is categorised as follows: domestic utilities, terracotta and other decorative items and roofing tiles and other heavy pottery items. Around 3,200 families were involved in pottery making in the district in 2002. 20 families were involved in Simlipal CD block.

=== Banking ===
In 2013-14, Simlapal CD block had offices of 6 commercial banks and 4 gramin banks.

=== Backward Regions Grant Fund ===
The Bankura district is listed as a backward region and receives financial support from the Backward Regions Grant Fund. The fund, created by the Government of India, is designed to redress regional imbalances in development. As of 2012, 272 districts across the country were listed under this scheme. The list includes 11 districts of West Bengal.

== Transport ==
In 2013-14, Simlapal CD block had 10 originating/ terminating bus routes. The nearest railway station is 42 km from the CD block headquarters.

State Highway 2 running from Bankura to Malancha (in North 24 Parganas district) and State Highway 9 running from Durgapur (in Paschim Bardhaman district) to Nayagram (in Jhargram district) pass through this CD block.

== Education ==
In 2013-14, Simlapal CD block had 173 primary schools with 11,160 students, 20 middle schools with 3,645 students, 7 high schools with 2,353 students and 14 higher secondary schools with 15,575 students. Simlapal CD block had 236 institutions for special and non-formal education with 7,839 students.

See also – Education in India

According to the 2011 census, in the Simlapal CD block, among the 191 inhabited villages, 42 villages did not have a school, 33 villages had two or more primary schools, 34 villages had at least 1 primary and 1 middle school and 18 villages had at least 1 middle and 1 secondary school.

== Healthcare ==
In 2014, Simlapal CD block had 1 rural hospital and 3 primary health centres with total 50 beds and 8 doctors. It had 21 family welfare sub centres and 1 family welfare centre. 7,419 patients were treated indoor and 153,615 patients were treated outdoor in the hospitals, health centres and subcentres of the CD block.

Simlapal Rural Hospital, with 30 beds at Simlapal, is the major government medical facility in the Simlapal CD block. There are primary health centres at Hatibari (Bon Dubrajpur) (with 4 beds), Lakshmisagar (Rasikpur) (with 10 beds), Arrah (with 6 beds).
