= Khatra (community development block) =

- Community development block
- Coordinates: 22.98°N 86.85°E
- Country: India
- State: West Bengal
- District: Bankura

Government
  - Type: Representative democracy

Area
  - Total: 232.40 km^{2} (89.73 sq mi)
- Elevation: 89 m (292 ft)

Population (2011)
  - Total: 117,030
  - Density: 503.57/km^{2} (1,304.2/sq mi)

Languages
  - Official: Bengali, Santali, English
- Time zone: UTC+5:30 (IST)
- PIN: 722140 (Khatra); 722135 (Gorabari)
- Telephone/STD code: 03243
- ISO 3166 code: IN-WB
- Vehicle registration: WB-67, WB-68
- Literacy: 72.18%
- Lok Sabha constituency: Bankura
- Vidhan Sabha constituency: Ranibandh
- Website: bankura.gov.in

Khatra is a community development block (CD block) that forms an administrative division in the Khatra subdivision of the Bankura district in the Indian state of West Bengal.

== History ==
From around the 7th century AD till around the advent of British rule, for around a millennium, history of Bankura district is identical with the rise and fall of the Hindu Rajas of Bishnupur. The Bishnupur Rajas, who were at the summit of their fortunes towards the end of the 17th century, started declining in the first half of the 18th century. First, the Maharaja of Burdwan seized the Fatehpur Mahal, and then the Maratha invasions laid waste their country.

Bishnupur was ceded to the British with the rest of Burdwan chakla in 1760. In 1787, Bishnupur was united with Birbhum to form a separate administrative unit. In 1793 it was transferred to the Burdwan collectorate. In 1879, the district acquired its present shape with the thanas of Khatra and Raipur and the outpost of Simplapal being transferred from Manbhum, and the thanas of Sonamukhi, Kotulpur and Indas being retransferred from Burdwan. However, it was known for sometime as West Burdwan and in 1881 came to be known as Bankura district.

== Geography ==
Map of Bankura District showing CD blocks and municipalities

Khatra is located at 22°59′N 86°51′E.

Khatra CD block is located in the western part of the district and belongs to the hard rock area. There are picturesque low hills, locally called masaker pahar.

Khatra CD block is bounded by Hirbandh and Indpur CD blocks on the north, Taldangra and Simplapal CD blocks on the east, Raipur and Ranibandh CD blocks on the south and Ranibandh and Hirbandh CD blocks on the west.

Khatra CD block has an area of 231.82 km^{2}. It has 1 panchayat samity, 7 gram panchayats, 86 gram sansads (village councils), 155 mouzas, 146 inhabited villages and 2 census towns. Khatra police station serves this block. Headquarters of this CD block is at Khatra.

Large forests areas exist in Sonamukhi, Joypur, Bishnupur, Khatra and Ranibandh areas.

Gram panchayats of Khatra block/ panchayat samiti are: Baidyanathpur, Dahala, Dhanra, Gorabari, Khatra I, Khatra II and Supur.

== Demographics ==
=== Population ===
According to the 2011 Census of India, Khatra CD block had a total population of 117,030, of which 104,592 were rural and 12,438 were urban. There were 60,058 (51%) males and 56,972 (49%) females. Population in the age range of 0 to 6 years was 13,434. Scheduled Castes numbered 30,947 (26.44%) and Scheduled Tribes numbered 25,765 (22.02%).

According to the 2001 census, Khatra block had a total population of 102,582, out of which 52,582 were males and 50,000 were females. Khatra block registered a population growth of 14.73 per cent during the 1991-2001 decade. Decadal growth for the district was 13.79 per cent. Decadal growth in West Bengal was 17.84 per cent.

Census Towns in Khatra CD block are (2011 census figures in brackets): Khatra (7,382) and Ledisol (5,056).

Villages in Khatra CD block are (2011 census figures in brackets): Dahala (2,681), Dhanara (1,534), Gorabari (1,063), Supur (3,198) and Baidyanathpur (1,706).

=== Literacy ===
According to the 2011 census, the total number of literates in Khatra CD block was 74,775 (72.18% of the population over 6 years) out of which males numbered 44,342 (83.43% of the male population over 6 years) and females numbered 30,433 (60.33%) of the female population over 6 years). The gender disparity (the difference between female and male literacy rates) was 23.10%.

See also – List of West Bengal districts ranked by literacy rate

Literacy in CD blocks of
Bankura district
Bankura Sadar subdivision
Saltora – 61.45%
Mejia – 66.83%
Gangajalghati – 68.11%
Chhatna – 65.73%
Bankura I – 68.74%
Bankura II – 73.59%
Barjora – 71.67%
Onda – 65.82%
Bishnupur subdivision
Indas – 71.70%
Joypur – 74.57%
Patrasayer – 64.8%
Kotulpur – 78.01%
Sonamukhi – 66.16%
Bishnupur – 66.30%
Khatra subdivision
Indpur – 67.42%
Ranibandh – 68.53%
Khatra – 72.18%
Hirbandh – 64.18%
Raipur – 71.33%
Sarenga – 74.25%
Simlapal – 68.44%
Taldangra – 70.87%
2011 Census: CD Block Wise

Primary Census Abstract Data

=== Language and religion ===
Religion in Khatra CD block (2011)
Hinduism	84.08%
Other (tribal religion)	13.03%
Islam	2.78%
Other or not stated	0.11%

In the 2011 census Hindus numbered 98,404 and formed 84.08% of the population in Khatra CD block. Muslims numbered 3,254 and formed 2.78% of the population. Others numbered 15,372 and formed 13.14% of the population. Others include Addi Bassi, Marang Boro, Santal, Saranath, Sari Dharma, Sarna, Alchchi, Bidin, Sant, Saevdharm, Seran, Saran, Sarin, Kheria, and other religious communities. In 2001, Hindus were 79.78%, Muslims 2.71% and tribal religions 17.44% of the population respectively.

Languages of Khatra CD block (2011)
1. Bengali (85.3%)
2. Santali (12.1%)
3. Kurmali (2.31%)
4. Others (0.23%)

At the time of the 2011 census, 85.35% of the population spoke Bengali, 12.11% Santali and 2.31% Kurmali as their first language.

== Rural poverty ==
In Khatra CD block 46.87% families were living below poverty line in 2007. According to the Rural Household Survey in 2005, 28.87% of the total number of families were BPL families in the Bankura district.

Migration has been observed in the following CD blocks of Bankura district: Bankura I, Chhatna, Saltora, Indpur, Ranibandh, Hirbandh, Khatra, Raipur and Sarenga. Although authentic figures are not available, a sample survey has been done. According to the sample survey, around 54.5% to 85.4% of the families on an average migrate from these blocks. Another study shows that around 23% of the people from the under-privileged blocks in the western and southern Bankura migrate. Those migrating belong mostly to the SC or ST population. They migrate for periods varying from 15 days to 6/8 months. Most people migrate to meet their food deficit and go to Bardhaman and Hooghly districts but some go to Gujarat and Maharashtra as construction labour.

== Economy ==
=== Livelihood ===
Livelihood
in Khatra CD block
1. Cultivators (16.7%)
2. Agricultural labourers (53.2%)
3. Household industries (2.01%)
4. Other Workers (28.1%)

In the Khatra CD block in 2011, among the class of total workers, cultivators numbered 7,575 and formed 16.67%, agricultural labourers numbered 24,186 and formed 53.23%, household industry workers numbered 914 and formed 2.01% and other workers numbered 12,776 and formed 28.09%. Total workers numbered 45,441 and formed 38.83% of the total population, and non-workers numbered 71,589 and formed 61.17% of the population.

Note: In the census records a person is considered a cultivator, if the person is engaged in cultivation/ supervision of land owned by self/government/institution. When a person who works on another person's land for wages in cash or kind or share, is regarded as an agricultural labourer. Household industry is defined as an industry conducted by one or more members of the family within the household or village, and one that does not qualify for registration as a factory under the Factories Act. Other workers are persons engaged in some economic activity other than cultivators, agricultural labourers and household workers. It includes factory, mining, plantation, transport and office workers, those engaged in business and commerce, teachers, entertainment artistes and so on.

=== Infrastructure ===
There are 146 inhabited villages in the Khatra CD block, as per the District Census Handbook, Bankura, 2011. 100% villages have power supply. 100% villages have drinking water supply. 18 villages (12.33%) have post offices. 133 villages (91.10%) have telephones (including landlines, public call offices and mobile phones). 55 villages (37.67%) have pucca (paved) approach roads and 38 villages (26.03%) have transport communication (includes bus service, rail facility and navigable waterways). 7 villages (4.79%) have agricultural credit societies and 7 villages (4.79%) have banks.

=== Kangsabati Project ===
The Kangsabati Project consists of a dam across the Kangsabati in Khatra CD block and three pick-up barrages – Shilabati, Bhairabbanki and Tarafeny.

The Kangsabati Project, with a designed irrigable area of 153,462 hectares in Bankura district, covers 13 CD blocks in Bankura district, 20 CD blocks in Paschim Medinipur and 2 CD blocks in Hooghly district. CD blocks covered in Bankura are: Bankura, Bishnupur, Kotulpur, Joypur, Onda, Indpur, Khatra, Hirbandh, Raipur, Sarenga, Simlapal, Taldangra and Ranibandh.

=== Agriculture ===
There were 39 fertiliser depots, 10 seed stores and 37 fair price shops in the Khatra CD block.

In 2013-14, persons engaged in agriculture in Khatra CD block could be classified as follows: bargadars 3.69%, patta (document) holders 8.55%, small farmers (possessing land between 1 and 2 hectares) 3.99%, marginal farmers (possessing land up to 1 hectare) 22.67% and agricultural labourers 61.11%.

In 2003-04 net area sown in Khatra CD block was 10,222 hectares and the area in which more than one crop was grown was 4,658 hectares.

In 2013-14, the total area irrigated in Khatra CD block was 7,996 hectares, out of which 5,246 hectares was by canal water, 1,500 hectares by tank water, 600 hectares by river lift irrigation, 370 hectares by open dug wells and 280 hectares by other methods.

In 2013-14, Khatra CD block produced 22,770 tonnes of Aman paddy, the main winter crop, from 9,222 hectares, 2,552 tonnes of Boro paddy from 973 hectares, 121 tonnes of wheat from 51 hectares and 694 tonnes of potatoes from 25 hectares. It also produced pulses and mustard.

=== Handloom and pottery industries ===
The handloom industry engages the largest number of persons in the non farm sector and hence is important in Bankura district. The handloom industry is well established in all the CD blocks of the district and includes the famous Baluchari saris. In 2004-05 Khatra CD block had 404 looms in operation.

Bankura district is famous for the artistic excellence of its pottery products that include the famous Bankura horse. The range of pottery products is categorised as follows: domestic utilities, terracota and other decorative items and roofing tiles and other heavy pottery items. Around 3,200 families were involved in pottery making in the district in 2002. 45 families were involved in Khatra CD block.

=== Banking ===
In 2013-14, Khatra CD block had offices of 7 commercial banks and 3 gramin banks.

=== Backward Regions Grant Fund ===
The Bankura district is listed as a backward region and receives financial support from the Backward Regions Grant Fund. The fund, created by the Government of India, is designed to redress regional imbalances in development. As of 2012, 272 districts across the country were listed under this scheme. The list includes 11 districts of West Bengal.

== Transport ==
In 2013-14, Khatra CD block had 7 originating/ terminating bus routes. The nearest railway station is 45 km from the CD block headquarters.

State Highway 2 (West Bengal) running from Bankura to Malancha (in North 24 Parganas district) and State Highway 4 (West Bengal) running from Jhalda (in Purulia district) to Digha foreshore (in Purba Medinipur district) cross at Khatra.

== Education ==
In 2013-14, Khatra CD block had 118 primary schools with 8,882 students, 17 middle schools with 2,068 students, 5 high schools with 2,413 students and 11 higher secondary schools with 9,752 students. Khatra CD block had 1 general college with 3,613 students, 1 professional/ technical institution with 100 students and 246 institutions for special and non-formal education with 5,686 students.

See also – Education in India

According to the 2011 census, in the Khatra CD block, among the 146 inhabited villages, 30 villages did not have a school, 17 villages had two or more primary schools, 27 villages had at least 1 primary and 1 middle school and 12 villages had at least 1 middle and 1 secondary school.

Khatra Adibasi Mahavidyalaya was established at Khatra in 1979.

== Healthcare ==
In 2014, Khatra CD block had 1 hospital, 1 block primary health centre and 1 primary health centre with total 125 beds and 23 doctors. It had 24 family welfare sub centres and 1 family welfare centre. 14,144 patients were treated indoor and 210,024 patients were treated outdoor in the hospitals, health centres and subcentres of the CD block.

Simla Block Primary Health Centre, with 10 beds at Khatra, is the major government medical facility in the Khatra CD block. There is a primary health centre at Bonabaid (Kankradara) (with 10 beds).
