= Baidyanathpur =

- Location in Bangladesh
- Coordinates: 23°25′N 90°39′E
- Country: Bangladesh
- Division: Chittagong Division
- District: Chandpur District
- Time zone: UTC+6 (Bangladesh Time)

For census town in West Bengal, India see Baidyanathpur, Paschim Bardhaman

Baidyanathpur is a village in the Chandpur District in the Chittagong Division of eastern Bangladesh.
