= Khatra =

Census town in West Bengal, India

- Census Town
- Location in West Bengal, India Khatra (India)
- Coordinates: 22.98°N 86.85°E
- Country: India
- State: West Bengal
- District: Bankura

Area
  - Total: 1.6161 km^{2} (0.6240 sq mi)
- Elevation: 154 m (505 ft)

Population (2011)
  - Total: 7,382
  - Density: 4,568/km^{2} (11,830/sq mi)

Languages*
  - Official: Bengali, Santali, English
- Time zone: UTC+5:30 (IST)
- PIN: 722140
- Telephone code: +91 3264
- Vehicle registration: WB
- Lok Sabha constituency: Bankura
- Vidhan Sabha constituency: Ranibandh
- Website: bankura.gov.in

Khatra (Bengali: খাতড়া khātṛā, Hindi: खातड़ा khātṛā) is a census town in the Khatra community development block in the Khatra subdivision of the Bankura district in the state of West Bengal, India. It is the headquarters of the Khatra subdivision.

== Geography ==
Places in Khatra subdivision in Bankura district
CT: census town, R: rural/ urban centre, C: craft centre, T: ancient/ temple centre
Owing to space constraints in the small map, the actual locations in a larger map may vary slightly

=== Location ===
Khatra is in the south-west of Bankura District, which is itself to the west of the southern part of West Bengal. Khatra is located at 22.98°N 86.85°E, and has an average elevation of 154 m (505 ft).

The Kangsabati irrigation project partly covers the Khatra sub-division, with the Kangsabati dam being important for farming in the districts of Bankura and Paschim Medinipur.

=== Area overview ===
The map alongside shows the Khatra subdivision of Bankura district. Physiographically, this area is having uneven lands with hard rocks. In the Khatra CD block area there are some low hills. The Kangsabati project reservoir is prominently visible in the map. The subdued patches of shaded area in the map show forested areas It is an almost fully rural area.

Note: The map alongside presents some of the notable locations in the subdivision. All places marked in the map are linked in the larger full screen map.

== Demographics ==
According to the 2011 Census of India, Khatra had a total population of 7,382 of which 3,774 (51%) were males and 3,608 (49%) were females. Population below 6 years was 672. The total number of literates in Khatra was 5,658 (84.32% of the population over 6 years).

.*For language details see Khatra (community development block)#Language and religion

== Civic administration ==
=== Police stations ===
- Khatra police station has jurisdiction over the Khatra CD block. The area covered is 229.68 km^{2} with a population of 117,022.
- Khatra Subdivision Women police station started on 1 July 2016 and has jurisdiction over whole of the Khatra subdivision.

=== CD block HQ ===
The headquarters of the Khatra CD block are located at Khatra.

== Infrastructure ==
According to the District Census Handbook 2011, Bankura, Khatra covered an area of 1.6161 km^{2}. Among the civic amenities, it had 11 km of roads with open drains, the protected water supply involved tap water from treated sources, tubewell/ borewell. It had 1,005 domestic electric connections and 221 road lighting points. Among the medical facilities it had 1 hospital, 5 dispensaries/ health centres, 2 maternity and child welfare centres, 1 veterinary hospital. Among the educational facilities it had were 4 primary schools, 2 middle schools, 2 secondary schools, 2 senior secondary schools, the nearest general degree college at Supur 3 km away. It had 1 recognised shorthand, typewriting and vocational training institute, 4 non-formal education centres (Sarva Shiksha Abhiyan). It had the branch of 1 cooperative bank.

== Education ==
Khatra Adibasi Mahavidyalaya is an undergraduate college, located 3 km away from Khatra town, was established in 1979. Affiliated with Bankura University it offers honours courses in Bengali, Santali, English, Sanskrit, history, philosophy, accountancy and mathematics. It also offers general courses in arts, science and commerce.

Khatra Higher Secondary School is a Bengali-medium coeducational institution established in 1920. It has facilities for teaching from class V to class XII. The school has 21 computers, a library with 800 books and a playground.

Khatra Girls Higher Secondary School is a Bengali-medium girls only institution established in 1959. It has facilities for teaching from class V to class XII. The school has 14 computers and a library with 3,000 books.

Kangsabati Sishu Vidyalaya is a Bengali-medium coeducational institution established in 1973. It has facilities for teaching from class V to class XII. The school has 10 computers, a library with 1,050 books and a playground.

== Healthcare ==
Khatra has a Subdivisional Hospital with 100 beds. There was no sub-divisional hospital until 2006. After delays due to water shortage, the hospital was opened by West Bengal Chief Minister Buddhadeb Bhattacharya, on 18 November 2006.

Simla Block Primary Health Centre, with 10 beds at Khatra, is the major government medical facility in the Khatra CD block. There is a primary health centre at Bonabaid (Kankradara) (with 10 beds).

== Culture ==
The Golden Jubilee of the Kangsabati movement was celebrated in Khatra on 30 August–31, 2006.

The Bratachari movement, pioneered by Gurusaday Dutt, has much support in the area.
