= Baragari =

- Village
- Location in West Bengal, India Baragari (India)
- Coordinates: 22°51′51.1″N 87°00′21.26″E
- Country: India
- State: West Bengal
- District: Bankura

Population (2011)
  - Total: 615

Languages*
  - Official: Bengali, Santali, English
- Time zone: UTC+5:30 (IST)
- PIN: 722150
- Telephone/STD code: 03242
- Lok Sabha constituency: Bankura
- Vidhan Sabha constituency: Raipur
- Website: bankura.gov.in

Baragari is a village in PO Jambani and the Raipur CD block in the Khatra subdivision of the Bankura district in the state of West Bengal, India

== Geography ==
Places in Khatra subdivision in Bankura district
CT: census town, R: rural/ urban centre, C: craft centre, T: ancient/ temple centre
Owing to space constraints in the small map, the actual locations in a larger map may vary slightly

=== Location ===
Baragari is located at 22°51′51.1″N 87°00′21.26″E.

=== Area overview ===
The map alongside shows the Khatra subdivision of Bankura district. Physiographically, this area is having uneven lands with hard rocks. In the Khatra CD block area there are some low hills. The Kangsabati project reservoir is prominently visible in the map. The subdued patches of shaded area in the map show forested areas. It is an almost fully rural area.

Note: The map alongside presents some of the notable locations in the subdivision. All places marked in the map are linked in the larger full screen map.

== Demographics ==
According to the 2011 Census of India, Baragari had a total population of 615 of which 310 (50%) were males and 305 (50%) were females. Population below 6 years was 70. The total number of literates in Baragari was 367 (67.34% of the population over 6 years).

.*For language details see Raipur, Bankura (community development block)#Language and religion

== Transport ==
It is near Pirolgari Morh where State Highway 4 and State Highway 9 meet.

== Education ==
Pandit Raghunath Murmu Smriti Mahavidyalaya was established at Baragiri in 1986. The college is named after Pandit Raghunath Murmu who invented the "Ol Chiki" script used in Santali language. The college is affiliated to the Bankura University, It offers honours courses in Bengali, Santali, English, Sanskrit, Geography, History, Political Science, Philosophy, Computer Science, Mathematics, Physics, Chemistry, Economics, Forestry and general courses in science and arts. It offers post-graduate courses in Bengali, Santali, Geo-Informatics, Geography and Rural Development & Planning.
