= Indpur =

- Village
- Location in West Bengal, India E Indpur (India)
- Coordinates: 23°10′00.1″N 86°55′59.9″E
- Country: India
- State: West Bengal
- District: Bankura

Population (2011)
  - Total: 2,573

Languages
  - Official: Bengali, English
- Time zone: UTC+5:30 (IST)
- PIN: 722136 (Indpur)
- Telephone/STD code: 03243
- Lok Sabha constituency: Bankura
- Vidhan Sabha constituency: Chhatna
- Website: bankura.gov.in

Indpur is a village in the Indpur CD block in the Khatra subdivision of the Bankura district in the state of West Bengal, India.

== Geography ==
Places in Khatra subdivision in Bankura district
CT: census town, R: rural/ urban centre, C: craft centre, T: ancient/ temple centre
Owing to space constraints in the small map, the actual locations in a larger map may vary slightly

=== Location ===
Indpur is located at 23°10′00.1″N 86°55′59.9″E.

=== Area overview ===
The map alongside shows the Khatra subdivision of Bankura district. Physiographically, this area is having uneven lands with hard rocks. In the Khatra CD block area there are some low hills. The Kangsabati project reservoir is prominently visible in the map. The subdued patches in the map show forested areas It is an almost fully rural area.

Note: The map alongside presents some of the notable locations in the subdivision. All places marked in the map are linked in the larger full screen map.

== Demographics ==
According to the 2011 Census of India, Indpur had a total population of 2,573 of which 1,336 (52%) were males and 1,237 (48%) were females. Population below six years was 232. The total number of literates in Indpur was 1,798 (76.80% of the population over six years).

== Civic administration ==
=== Police station ===
Indpur police station has jurisdiction over Indpur CD block. The area covered is 300.20 km^{2} with a population of 156,462.

=== CD block HQ ===
The headquarters of Indpur CD block are located at Indpur.

== Transport ==
State Highway 2 running from Bankura to Malancha (in North 24 Parganas district) passes through Indpur.

== Education ==
Indpur Goenka High School is a Bengali-medium coeducational institution established in 1946. It has facilities for teaching from class V to class XII. The school has 14 computers and a library with 2,825 books.

Keliapathar Vivekanada High School at Indpur is a Bengali-medium coeducational institution established in 1969. It has facilities for teaching from class V to class XII. The school has a library with 600 books and a playground.

Bagdiha High School at Indpur is a Bengali-medium coeducational institution established in 1971. It has facilities for teaching from class V to class XII. The school has five computers, a library with 1,210 books and a playground.

== Healthcare ==
Indpur Rural Hospital, with 30 beds at Indpur, is the major government medical facility in the Indpur CD block. There are primary health centres at Hatgram (with four beds), Gunnath (with six beds) and Saldiha (with 10 beds).
