= Hirbandh =

- Village
- Location in West Bengal, India Hirbandh (India)
- Coordinates: 23°03′48.2″N 86°48′08.2″E
- Country: India
- State: West Bengal
- District: Bankura

Population (2011)
  - Total: 1,733

Languages*
  - Official: Bengali, Santali, English
- Time zone: UTC+5:30 (IST)
- PIN: 722121(Indpur)
- Telephone/STD code: 03243
- Lok Sabha constituency: Bankura
- Vidhan Sabha constituency: Ranibandh
- Website: bankura.gov.in

Hirbandh is a village in the Hirbandh CD block in the Khatra subdivision of the Bankura district in the state of West Bengal, India.

== Geography ==
Places in Khatra subdivision in Bankura district
CT: census town, R: rural/ urban centre, C: craft centre, T: ancient/ temple centre
Owing to space constraints in the small map, the actual locations in a larger map may vary slightly

=== Location ===
Hirbandh is located at 23°03′48.2″N 86°48′08.2″E.

=== Area overview ===
The map alongside shows the Khatra subdivision of Bankura district. Physiographically, this area is having uneven lands with hard rocks. In the Khatra CD block area there are some low hills. The Kangsabati project reservoir is prominently visible in the map. The subdued patches of shaded area in the map show forested areas It is an almost fully rural area.

Note: The map alongside presents some of the notable locations in the subdivision. All places marked in the map are linked in the larger full screen map.

== Demographics ==
According to the 2011 Census of India, Hirbandh had a total population of 1,733 of which 859 (50%) were males and 874 (50%) were females. Population below 6 years was 175. The total number of literates in Hirbandh was 1,128 (72.40% of the population over 6 years).

.*For language details see Hirbandh (community development block)#Language and religion

== Civic administration ==
=== Police station ===
Hirbandh police station has jurisdiction over the Hirbandh CD block. The area covered is 215.80 km^{2} with a population of 72,502.

=== CD block HQ ===
The headquarters of Hirbandh CD block are located at Hirbandh.

== Transport ==
State Highway 4 running from Jhalda (in the Purulia District) to Digha (in the Purba Medinipur District) passes through Hirbandh.

== Education ==
Hirbandh High School is a Bengali medium coeducational institution established in 1942. It has facilities for teaching from class V to class XII and vocational education post class XII. The school has 30 computers and a library with 3,500 books. It is one of the fourteen schools in Bankura District in which the opening of an Olchiki medium section (for Santali language) from class V was sanctioned in 2012.

Deulgora Bhuakana P.P.A. High School at Hirbandh is a Bengali medium coeducational institution established in 1962. It has facilities for teaching from class V to class XII. The school has 1 computer, a library with 100 books, and a playground.

== Healthcare ==
Amjhuri (Hirbandh) Rural Hospital, with 30 beds at Hirbandh, is the major government medical facility in the Hirbandh CD block. There are primary health centres at Mosiara (Dharampur) (with 4 beds) and Molian (Shyamnagar) (with 10 beds).
