= Khatra subdivision =

- Subdivision
- Interactive map of Khatra subdivision
- Coordinates: 22.98°N 86.85°E
- Country: India
- State: West Bengal
- District: Bankura
- Headquarters: Khatra

Area
  - Total: 2,047.49 km^{2} (790.54 sq mi)

Population (2011)
  - Total: 1,045,591
  - Density: 510.670/km^{2} (1,322.63/sq mi)

Languages
  - Official: Bengali, English
- Time zone: UTC+5:30 (IST)
- ISO 3166 code: IN-WB
- Vehicle registration: WB
- Website: http://sdokhatra.com/

Khatra subdivision is a subdivision of the Bankura district in the state of West Bengal, India.

== History ==
Khatra subdivision was established as an additional subdivision on 27 March 1986 and as a full-fledged subdivision on 2 November 1992, previously it was part of sadar subdivision.

== Geography ==
Khatra subdivision is geologically located in the erosional eastern part of Chota Nagpur Plateau. Mashak Hill is the highest point in this subdivision. Kangsabati and Shilabati are two prominent river in this subdivision.

== Subdivisions in the district ==
Bankura district is divided into the following administrative subdivisions:

Subdivision	Headquarters	Area km^{2}	Population (2011)	Rural Population % (2001)	Urban Population % (2001)
Bankura Sadar	Bankura	2596.11	1,439,148	89.27	11.43
Khatra	Khatra	2407.49	1,045.591	100.00	0
Bishnupur	Bishnupur	1870.75	1,111,935	91.04	8.96
Bankura district	Bankura	6882.00	3,596,674	92.63	7.37

Khatra subdivision has a density of population of 434 per km^{2}. 29.07% of the population of the district resides in this subdivision.

Places in Khatra subdivision in Bankura district
CT: census town, R: rural/ urban centre, C: craft centre, T: ancient/ temple centre
Owing to space constraints in the small map, the actual locations in a larger map may vary slightly

== Administrative units ==
Khatra subdivision has 9 police stations, 8 community development blocks, 8 panchayat samitis, 59 gram panchayats, 1,311 inhabited villages, 4 census towns. The census towns are: Khatra, Ledisol, Simlapal and Raipur Bazar. The subdivision has its headquarters at Khatra.

== Police stations ==
Police stations in Khatra subdivision have the following features and jurisdiction:

Police Station	Area covered km^{2}	Municipalities	CD Block
Indpur	300.20	–	Indpur
Khatra	229.68	–	Khatra
Khatra Subdivision Women's		–	All blocks in Khatra subdivision
Hirbandh	215.80	–	Hirbandh
Ranibandh		–	Ranibandh
Barikul		–	Ranibandh
Taldangra	349.7	–	Taldangra
Simlapal	309.27	–	Simlapal
Raipur	252.55	–	Raipur
Sarenga	235.68	–	Sarenga

== Blocks ==
Community development blocks in Khatra subdivision are:

CD Block	Headquarters	Area km^{2}	Population (2011)	SC %	ST %	Literacy Rate %	Census Towns
Khatra	Khatra	231.82	117,030	26.44	22.02	72.18	2
Indpur	Indpur	302.60	156,522	40.59	9.59	67.42	
Hirbandh	Hirbandh	190.97	83,834	27.23	28.40	64.18	
Ranibandh	Ranibandh	428.51	119,089	11.45	47.07	68.53	
Raipur	Garh Raipur	369.92	171,377	21.86	27.66	71.33	1
Sarenga	Sarenga	223.78	106,808	29.12	19.11	74.25	
Simlapal	Simlapal	310.15	143,038	26.38	14.88	68.44	1
Taldangra	Taldangra	349.74	147,893	26.30	13.93	70.87	

=== Gram Panchayats ===
The subdivision contains 59 gram panchayats under eight community development blocs:

- Khatra block: Baidyanathpur, Dhanarah, Khatra Gram–I, Supur, Dahala, Gorabari and Khatra Gram–II.
- Indpur block: Brahmandiha, Gaurbazar, Indpur, Veduasol, Brojarajpur, Hatgram and Raghunathpur.
- Hirbandh block: Baharamuri, Hirbandh, Moshiara, Gopalpur and Maliyan.
- Raipur: Dhanarah, Fulkusma, Motgoda, Sonagara, Dheko, Melera, Raipur, Dundar, Mondalkuli and Shyamsundarpur.
- Sarenga block: Bikrampur, Gargarla, Neturpur, Chiltore, Goalbari and Sarenga.
- Ranibandh block: Ambikanagar, Haludkanali, Rajakata, Rautora, Barikul, Puddi, Ranibandh and Rudra.
- Simlapal block: Bikrampur, Lakshmisagar, Mondalgram, Simlapal, Dubrajpur, Machatora and Parswala.
- Taldangra block: Amdangra, Harmasra, Saltora, Bibarda, Khalgram, Satmauli, Fulmati, Panchmura and Taldangra.

== Education ==
Bankura district had a literacy rate of 70.26% as per the provisional figures of the census of India 2011. Bankura Sadar subdivision had a literacy rate of 69.56%, Khatra subdivision 69.79% and Bishnupur subdivision 71.60%.

Given in the table below (data in numbers) is a comprehensive picture of the education scenario in Bankura district for the year 2013–14. It may be noted that primary schools include junior basic schools; middle schools, high schools and higher secondary schools include madrasahs; technical schools include junior technical schools, junior government polytechnics, industrial technical institutes, industrial training centres, nursing training institutes etc.; technical and professional colleges include engineering colleges, medical colleges, para-medical institutes, management colleges, teachers training and nursing training colleges, law colleges, art colleges, music colleges etc. Special and non-formal education centres include sishu siksha kendras, madhyamik siksha kendras, centres of Rabindra mukta vidyalaya, recognised Sanskrit tols, institutions for the blind and other handicapped persons, Anganwadi centres, reformatory schools etc.

Subdivision	Primary School		Middle School		High School		Higher Secondary School		General College, Univ		Technical / Professional Instt		Non-formal Education	
Subdivision	Institution	Student	Institution	Student	Institution	Student	Institution	Student	Institution	Student	Institution	Student	Institution	Student
Bankura Sadar	1,371	117,820	144	17,951	90	69,329	91	78,909	9	14,782	14	2,865	2,228	69,919
Khatra	1,200	86,786	113	16,805	50	28,178	112	93,919	6	13,067	6	702	1,993	51,849
Bishnupur	979	86,750	112	15,092	57	28,738	81	78,915	6	10,552	14	4,170	1,649	57,769
Bankura district	3,550	291,356	369	49,848	197	126,245	284	251,743	21	38,401	34	7,737	5,870	179,537

=== Educational institutions ===
The following institutions are located in Khatra subdivision:

- Panchmura Mahavidyalaya at Panchmura was established in 1965.
- Khatra Adibasi Mahavidyalaya was established at Khatra in 1979.
- Pandit Raghunath Murmu Smriti Mahavidyalaya was established at Baragari, PO Jambani in 1986.
- Raipur Block Mahavidyalaya located at Village and PO Kharigerya was established in 2010.
- Birsha Munda Memorial College was established in 2010 at Village Pirrah, PO Haludkanali.
- Government General Degree College, Ranibandh has been started in 2015 at Rautara.
- Simlapal College of Education at Simlapal offers courses leading to the Bachelor of Education degree. It was established in 2009 and affiliated to the University of Burdwan in 2012.

== Healthcare ==
The table below (all data in numbers) presents an overview of the medical facilities available and patients treated in the hospitals, health centres and sub-centres in 2014 in Bankura district.

Subdivision	Health & Family Welfare Deptt, WB				Other State Govt Deptts	Local bodies	Central Govt Deptts / PSUs	NGO / Private Nursing Homes	Total	Total Number of Beds	Total Number of Doctors	Indoor Patients	Outdoor Patients
Subdivision	Hospitals	Rural Hospitals	Block Primary Health Centres	Primary Health Centres	Other State Govt Deptts	Local bodies	Central Govt Deptts / PSUs	NGO / Private Nursing Homes	Total	Total Number of Beds	Total Number of Doctors	Indoor Patients	Outdoor Patients
Bankura Sadar	2	6	2	25	3	-	2	31	71	2,628	320	147,890	2,634,248
Khatra	1	7	1	21	-	-	-	4	34	698	77	58,258	1,440,172
Bishnupur	1	5	1	23	-	-	-	11	41	698	77	68,068	1,351,349
Bankura district	4	18	4	69	3	-	2	46	146	4,152	459	274,216	5,425,769

=== Medical facilities ===
Medical facilities in Khatra subdivision are as follows:

Hospitals: (Name, location, beds)

- Khatra Subdivisional Hospital, Khatra, 100 beds

Rural Hospitals: (Name, CD block, location, beds)

- Taldangra Rural Hospital, Taldangra CD block, Taldangra, 30 beds
- Indpur Rural Hospital, Indpur CD block, Indpur, 30 beds

Block Primary Health Centres: (Name, CD block, location, beds)

- Simla Block Primary Health Centre, Khatra CD block, Khatra, 10 beds

Primary Health Centres : (CD block-wise)(CD block, PHC location, beds)

- Khatra CD block: Bonabaid (Kankradara) (10)
- Hirbandh CD block: Mosiara (Dharampur) (4), Molian (Shyamnagar) (10)
- Ranibandh CD block: Jhilimili (10), Barikul (2), Halud Kanali (6), Khejuria (6)
- Taldangra CD block: Harmasra (6), Amdanga (Sabrakon) (10), Panchmura (6), Bibarda (2)
- Simlapal CD block: Hatibari (Bon Dubrajpur) (4), Lakshmisagar (Rasikpur) (10), Arrah (6)
- Raipur CD block: Matgoda (6), Phulkusma (10)
- Sarenga CD block: Dumurtor (Tikarpara) Sarenga (6), Krishnapur (Dumurtor) (10)
- Indpur CD block: Hatgram (4), Gunnath (6), Saldiha (10)

== Electoral constituencies ==
Lok Sabha (parliamentary) and Vidhan Sabha (state assembly) constituencies in Bankura district were as follows:

Lok Sabha constituency	Vidhan Sabha constituency	Reservation	CD Block and/or Gram panchayats
Bankura	Raghunathpur	SC	In Purulia district
	Saltora	SC	Saltora and Mejia CD Blocks; Banasuria, Barashal, Lachhmanpur and Latiaboni gram panchayats of Gangajalghati CD Block
	Chhatna	None	Chhatna CD Block; Veduasol, Brahmandiha, Hatgram, Indpur and Raghunathpur GPs of Indpur CD Block
	Ranibandh	ST	Ranibandh, Hirbandh and Khatra CD Blocks
	Raipur	ST	Raipur and Sarenga CD Blocks
	Taldangra	None	Bibarda, Fulmati, Harmasra, Khalgram, Panchmura and Taldangra GPs of Taldangra CD Block; Brojarajpur and Gaurbazar gram panchayats of Indpur CD Block; and Simlapal CD Block
	Bankura	None	Bankura municipality; Bankura I CD Block; and Junbedia, Mankanali and Purandarpur GPs of Bankura II CD Block
Bishnupur (SC)	Barjora	None	Barjora CD Block; and Bhaktabandh, Gangajalghati, Gobindadham, Kapista, Nityanandapur and Piraboni GPs of Gangajalghati CD Block
	Onda	None	Onda CD Block; and Bikna, Kosthia, Narrah and Sanbandha GPs of Bankura II CD Block
	Bishnupur	Open	Bishnupur municipality; Bishnupur; and Amdangra, Saltora and Satmauli GPs of Taldangra CD Block
	Katulpur	SC	Deshrahkoyalpara, Gopinathpur, Kotulpur, Lego, Mirzapur and Sihar GPs of Kotulpur CD Block; Gelia, Jagannathpur, Kuchiakol, Maynapur, Salda, Uttarbarh, Hetia, Routkhanda and Shyamnagar GPs of Joypur CD Block
	Indas	SC	Indas CD Block; Balsi I, Balsi II, Biur Betur, Jamkuri and Kushdwip GPs of Patrasayer CD Block; and Laugram, Madanmohanpur GPs of Kotulpur CD Block
	Sonamukhi	SC	Sonamukhi municipality; Sonamukhi CD Block; and Belut Rasulpur, Beersingha, Hamirpur, Narayanpur and Patrasayar GPs of Patrasayer CD Block
	Khandaghosh	None	In Bardhaman district
