= List of state highways in West Bengal =

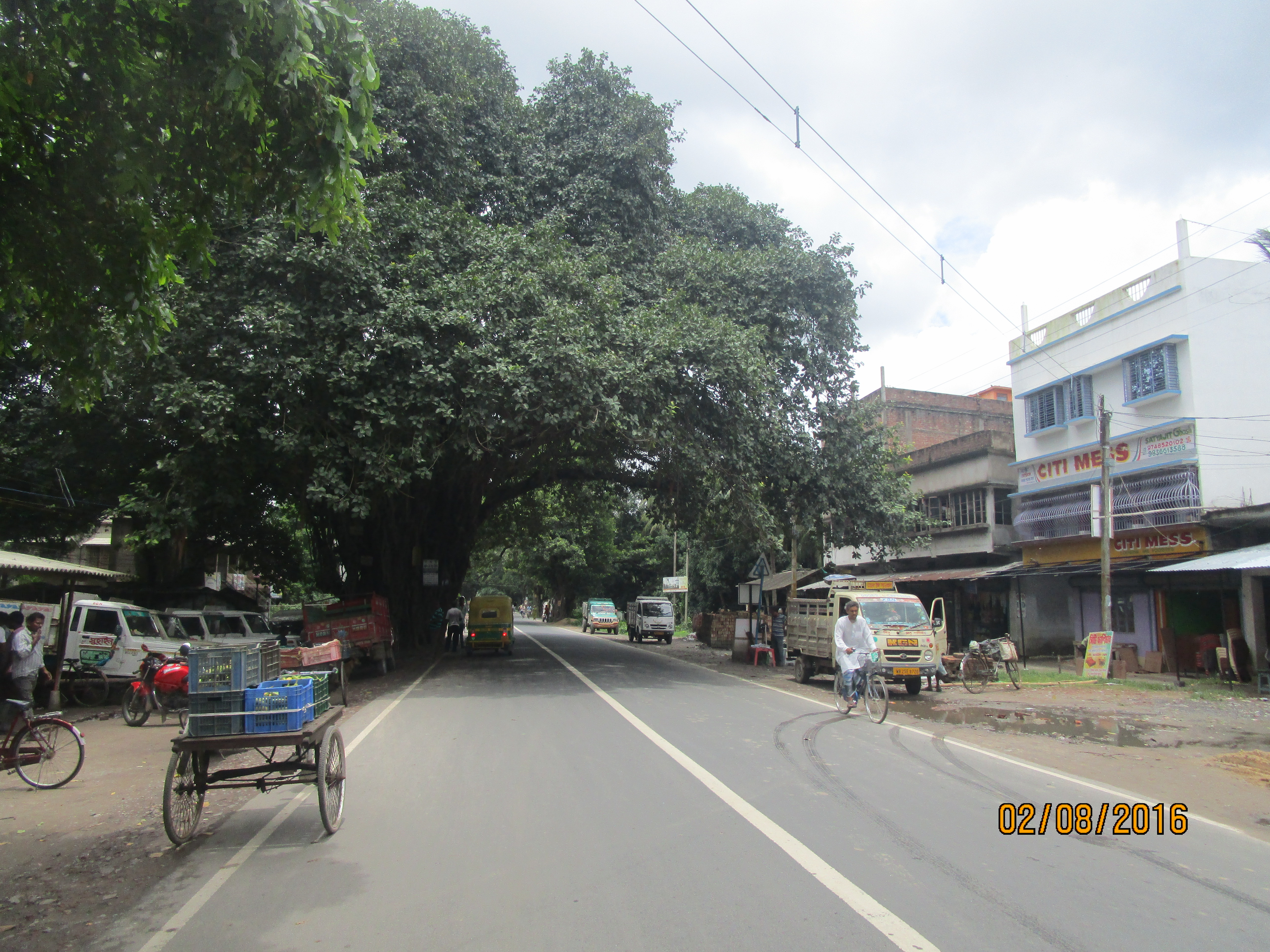
SH 2 at Kajibari, Uttarpara, Barasat.

This is a list of state highways in West Bengal, India.

== Introduction ==
West Bengal state has a good road network. There are 15 state highways.

== List of state highways in West Bengal ==
Number	Length (km)	Length (mi)	Southern or western terminus	Northern or eastern terminus	Formed	Removed	Notes
SH 1	151	94	Bongaon– Chakdaha- Kalyani- Barrackpore- Kolkata- Jadavpur- Garia- Rajpur Sonarpur- Baruipur- Jaynagar Majilpur- Kulpi		—	—	
SH 2	323	201	Khatra-Taldangra - Bishnupur- Arambag- Tarakeswar- Uttarpara- Dakshineswar- Basirhat- Malancha		—	—	
SH 3	260	160	Krishnanagar– Helencha- Bangaon- Gaighata- Haroa- Ultadanga- Dhapa- Minakhan- Gosaba		—	—	
SH 4	466	290	Jhalda– Balarampur- Manbazar- Khatra- Raipur-Sarenga- Chandrakona- Ghatal- Panskura- Tamluk- Contai- Digha		—	—	
SH 4A	39	24	Tulin	Jhalda- Chas More 39	—	—	
SH 5	376	234	Rupnarayanpur- Neamatpur- Dishergarh- Raghunathpur- Purulia- Manbazar- Banduan– Jhilimili- Jhargram- Kharagpur- Keshiari- Belda- Junput		—	—	
SH 6	266	165	Rajnagar– Suri- Ahmedpur- Kirnahar- Katwa- Kalna- Saptagram- Uttarpara- Botanical Garden- Alampur		—	—	
SH 7	289	180	Rajgram- Nalhati– Morgram- Kuli- Natunhat- Burdwan- Arambag- Khirpai- Chandrakona- Keshpur- Medinipur		—	—	
SH 8	292	181	Santaldih– Raghunathpur- Saltora- Bankura- Beliatore- Sonamukhi- Patrasayer- Rasulpur- Kusumgram- Samudragarh- Krishnanagar- Majdia		—	—	
SH 9	251	156	Durgapur– Bankura-Taldangra- Simlapal- Raipur- Jhargram- Dahijuri- Fekohat-Gopiballavpur- Nayagram		—	—	
SH 10	173	107	Malda Town-Manikchak-Ratua-Samsi-Gazole-Buniadpur-Gangarampur-Balurghat–Hili		—	—	
SH 11	251	156	Mohammad Bazar – Sainthia-Kandi-Khagra-Baharampur-Jalangi-Karimpur-Krishnanagar-Ranaghat		—	—	
SH 11A	65	40	Bhagawangola-Lalgola-Jangipur-Raghunathganj		—	—	
SH 12	352	219	Naxalbari	Alipurduar	—	—	
SH 13	88	55	(NH 19 Palsit EM Bypass) Dankuni Via Memari Boinchi Pandua Mogra Baidyabati		—	—	
SH 14	226	140	Dubrajpur	Debagram	—	—	
SH 15	242	150	Dainhat - Manteswar - Memari - Chakdighi - Dasghara - Tarakeswar - Chanditala - Baltikuri - Munshirhat -Bargachia - Amta - Bagnan - Shvarnpur - Gadiara		—	—	Munshirhat

== Others ==
- North-South Road Corridor
