= Gangajalghati (community development block) =

- Community development block
- Interactive map of Gangajalghati
- Coordinates: 23.42°N 87.12°E
- Country: India
- State: West Bengal
- District: Bankura

Government
  - Type: Representative democracy

Area
  - Total: 366.47 km^{2} (141.49 sq mi)
- Elevation: 83 m (272 ft)

Population (2011)
  - Total: 180,974
  - Density: 493.83/km^{2} (1,279.0/sq mi)

Languages
  - Official: Bengali, English
- Time zone: UTC+5:30 (IST)
- PIN: 722 133 (Gangajalghati)
- Telephone/STD code: 03242
- ISO 3166 code: IN-WB
- Vehicle registration: WB-67, WB-68
- Literacy: 68.11%
- Lok Sabha constituency: Bankura, Bishnupur
- Vidhan Sabha constituency: Saltora, Barjora
- Website: bankura.gov.in

Gangajalghati is a community development block (CD block) that forms an administrative division in the Bankura Sadar subdivision of the Bankura district in the Indian state of West Bengal.

== History ==
=== From Bishnupur kingdom to the British Raj ===
From around the 7th century AD till around the advent of British rule, for around a millennium, history of Bankura district is identical with the rise and fall of the Hindu Rajas of Bishnupur. The Bishnupur Rajas, who were at the summit of their fortunes towards the end of the 17th century, started declining in the first half of the 18th century. First, the Maharaja of Burdwan seized the Fatehpur Mahal, and then the Maratha invasions laid waste their country.

Bishnupur was ceded to the British with the rest of Burdwan chakla in 1760. In 1787, Bishnupur was united with Birbhum to form a separate administrative unit. In 1793 it was transferred to the Burdwan collectorate. In 1879, the district acquired its present shape with the thanas of Khatra and Raipur and the outpost of Simplapal being transferred from Manbhum, and the thanas of Sonamukhi, Kotulpur and Indas being retransferred from Burdwan. However, it was known for sometime as West Burdwan and in 1881 came to be known as Bankura district.

== Geography ==
Map of Bankura District showing CD blocks and municipalities

Gangajalghati is located at 23.42°N 87.12°E. It has an average elevation of 110 metres (361 feet).

Gangajalghati CD block is located in the north-western part of the district. The Main Bankura Upland, of which Gangajalghati CD block is a part, is characterised by undulating terrain with many hills and ridges. The area is having a gradual descent from the Chota Nagpur Plateau. The soil is laterite red and hard beds are covered with scrub jungle and sal wood.

Gangajalghati CD block is bounded by Mejia CD block on the north, Barjora CD block on the east, Bankura II CD block on the south and Chhatna and Saltora CD blocks on the west.

Gangajalghati CD block has an area of 366.47 km^{2}. It has 1 panchayat samity, 10 gram panchayats, 138 gram sansads (village councils), 165 mouzas and 156 inhabited villages. Gangajalghati police station serves this block. Headquarters of this CD block is at Amarkanan.

Gram panchayats of Gangajalghati block/ panchayat samiti are: Ban Asuria, Barsol, Bhaktabandh, Gangajalghati, Gobindadham, Kapista, Lachmanpur, Latiabani, Nityandapur and Pirrabani.

== Demographics ==
=== Population ===
According to the 2011 Census of India Gangajalghati CD block had a total population of 180,974, all of which were rural. There were 93,252 (52%) males and 87,722 (48%) females. Population in the age range of 0 to 6 years was 21,412. Scheduled Castes numbered 63,832 (35.27%) and Scheduled Tribes numbered 7,160 (3.96%).

In the 2001 census, Gangajalghati community development bloc had a total population of 161,919 of which 83,060 were males and 78,869 were females. Decadal growth for the period 1991-2001 was 12.76% for Gangajalghati, against 13.79% in Bankura district. Decadal growth in West Bengal was 17.84%.

Large villages (with 4,000+ population) in Gangajalghati CD block are (2011 census figures in brackets): Gangajalghati (8,798), Keshiara (6,922) and Bhairabpur (4,669).

Other villages in Gangajalghati CD block are (2011 census figures in brackets): Pirrabani (2,252), Kapistha (3,757), Gobinda Dham (3,650), Lachmanpur (3,117), Latiabani (2,847), Barsal (2,550), Nityanandapur (2,151), Ban Ashuria (2,078) and Bhakta Band (1,850).

=== Literacy ===
According to the 2011 census the total number of literates in Gangajalghati CD block was 108,675 (68.11% of the population over 6 years) out of which males numbered 65,451 (79.79% of the male population over 6 years) and females numbered 43,224 (55.75%) of the female population over 6 years). The gender disparity (the difference between female and male literacy rates) was 24.04%.

See also – List of West Bengal districts ranked by literacy rate

Literacy in CD blocks of
Bankura district
Bankura Sadar subdivision
Saltora – 61.45%
Mejia – 66.83%
Gangajalghati – 68.11%
Chhatna – 65.73%
Bankura I – 68.74%
Bankura II – 73.59%
Barjora – 71.67%
Onda – 65.82%
Bishnupur subdivision
Indas – 71.70%
Joypur – 74.57%
Patrasayer – 64.8%
Kotulpur – 78.01%
Sonamukhi – 66.16%
Bishnupur – 66.30%
Khatra subdivision
Indpur – 67.42%
Ranibandh – 68.53%
Khatra – 72.18%
Hirbandh – 64.18%
Raipur – 71.33%
Sarenga – 74.25%
Simlapal – 68.44%
Taldangra – 70.87%
2011 Census: CD Block Wise

Primary Census Abstract Data

=== Language and religion ===
Religion in Gangajalghati CD block (2011)
Hinduism	97.34%
Other (tribal religion)	1.59%
Jainism	0.76%
Other or not stated	0.31%

In the 2011 census Hindus numbered 176,168 (97.34%) in Gangajalhati CD Block and Jains 1,384 (0.76%). Others numbered 3,422 and formed 1.89% of the population. Others include Addi Bassi, Marang Boro, Santal, Saranath, Sari Dharma, Sarna, Alchchi, Bidin, Sant, Saevdharm, Seran, Saran, Sarin, Kheria, and other religious communities.

Languages of Gangajalghati CD block (2011)
1. Bengali (95.6%)
2. Santali (3.76%)
3. Others (0.61%)

At the time of the 2011 census, 95.63% of the population spoke Bengali and 3.76% Santali as their first language.

== Rural poverty ==
In Gangajalghati CD Block 41.08% families were living below poverty line in 2007. According to the Rural Household Survey in 2005, 28.87% of the total number of families were BPL families in the Bankura district.

== Economy ==
=== Livelihood ===
Livelihood
in Gangajalghati CD block
1. Cultivators (24.3%)
2. Agricultural labourers (36.5%)
3. Household industries (3.71%)
4. Other Workers (35.5%)

In the Gangajalghati CD block in 2011, among the class of total workers, cultivators numbered 16,856 and formed 24.33%, agricultural labourers numbered 25,301 and formed 36.51%, household industry workers numbered 2,571 and formed 3.71% and other workers numbered 24,563 and formed 35.45%. Total workers numbered 69,291 and formed 38.29% of the total population, and non-workers numbered 111,683 and formed 61.71% of the population.

Note: In the census records a person is considered a cultivator, if the person is engaged in cultivation/ supervision of land owned by self/government/institution. When a person who works on another person's land for wages in cash or kind or share, is regarded as an agricultural labourer. Household industry is defined as an industry conducted by one or more members of the family within the household or village, and one that does not qualify for registration as a factory under the Factories Act. Other workers are persons engaged in some economic activity other than cultivators, agricultural labourers and household workers. It includes factory, mining, plantation, transport and office workers, those engaged in business and commerce, teachers, entertainment artistes and so on.

=== Infrastructure ===
There are 156 inhabited villages in the Gangajalghati CD block, as per the District Census Handbook, Bankura, 2011. 100% villages have power supply. 153 villages (98.08%) have drinking water supply. 22 villages (14.10%) have post offices. 124 villages (79.49%) have telephones (including landlines, public call offices and mobile phones). 53 villages (33.97%) have pucca (paved) approach roads and 34 villages (21.79%) have transport communication (includes bus service, rail facility and navigable waterways). 11 villages (7.05%) have agricultural credit societies and 7 villages (4.49%) have banks.

=== Agriculture ===
There were 47 fertiliser depots, 6 seed stores and 59 fair price shops in the CD block.

In Bankura district in 2010-11, 34.92% of the operational holdings were held in marginal holdings of less than 1 hectare by 68.22% of the holders. Another 31.16% of the operational holdings were held in small holdings between 1 and 2 hectares by 21.05% of the holders. In Bankura district, 23,389 hectares of vested land was distributed amongst 191,915 beneficiaries up to 31 October 2013.

In 2013-14, persons engaged in agriculture in Gangajalghati CD block could be classified as follows: bargadars 7.85%, patta (document) holders 12.32%, small farmers (possessing land between 1 and 2 hectares) 6.90%, marginal farmers (possessing land up to 1 hectare) 22.37% and agricultural labourers 50.56%.

In 2003-04 net area sown in Gangajalghati CD block was 22,335 hectares and the area in which more than one crop was grown was 893 hectares.

In 2013-14, the total area irrigated in Gangajalghati CD block was 7,268 hectares, out of which 443 hectares was by canal water, 6,095 hectares by tank water, 480 hectares by river lift irrigation, 5 hectares by shallow tubewells and 245 hectares by open dug wells.

In 2013-14, Gangajalghati CD block produced 5,781 tonnes of Aman paddy, the main winter crop, from 2.109 hectares, 12 tonnes of wheat from 12 hectares and 29,539,000 tonnes of potatoes from 1,010 hectares. It also produced pulses and mustard.

=== Power ===
In 1996 Mejia Thermal Power Station was set up by Damodar Valley Corporation at Durlabhpur. It has an installed capacity of 2340 MW – 4 units of 210 MW each, 2 units of 250 MW each and 2 units of 500 MW each.

=== Handloom and pottery industries ===
The handloom industry engages the largest number of persons in the non farm sector and hence is important in Bankura district. The handloom industry is well established in all the CD blocks of the district and includes the famous Baluchari saris. In 2004-05 Gangajalghati CD Block had 427 looms in operation.

Bankura district is famous for the artistic excellence of its pottery products that include the famous Bankura horse. The range of pottery products is categorised as follows: domestic utilities, terracota and other decorative items and roofing tiles and other heavy pottery items. Around 3,200 families were involved in pottery making in the district in 2002. 65 families were involved in Gangajalghati CD block.

=== Banking ===
In 2013-14, Gangajalghati CD block had offices of 6 commercial banks and 4 gramin banks.

=== Backward Regions Grant Fund ===
The Bankura district is listed as a backward region and receives financial support from the Backward Regions Grant Fund. The fund, created by the Government of India, is designed to redress regional imbalances in development. As of 2012, 272 districts across the country were listed under this scheme. The list includes 11 districts of West Bengal.

== Transport ==
In 2013-14, Gangajalghati CD Block had 9 originating/ terminating bus routes. The nearest railway station is 15 km from the CD block headquarters.

NH 14, (old numbering NH 60), running from Morgram to Kharagpur, passes through this CD block.

== Education ==
In 2013-14, Gangajalghati CD block had 166 primary schools with 13,461 students, 14 middle schools with 2,961 students, 11 high schools with 7,484 students and 12 higher secondary schools with 8,337 students. Gangajalghati CD block had 1 general college with 1,312 students, 1 professional/ technical institution with 63 students and 280 institutions for special and non-formal education with 8,522 students. Gangajalghati CD block had 10 mass literacy centres.

See also – Education in India

According to the 2011 census, in the Gangajalghati CD block, among the 156 inhabited villages, 19 villages did not have a school, 38 villages had two or more primary schools, 39 villages had at least 1 primary and 1 middle school and 23 villages had at least 1 middle and 1 secondary school.

Gobindaprasad Mahavidyalaya was established at Amarkanan in 1985 to pay homage to Gobinda Prasad Singha, an Indian independence activist.

== Healthcare ==
In 2014, Gangajalghati CD block had 1 rural hospital, 3 primary health centres and 1 private nursing home with total 75 beds and 8 doctors. It had 30 family welfare sub centres and 1 family welfare centre. 6,832 patients were treated indoor and 260,807 patients were treated outdoor in the hospitals, health centres and subcentres of the CD block.

Gangajalgati (Amar Kanan) Rural Hospital, with 30 beds at PO Amarkanan, is the major government medical facility in the Gangjalghati CD block. There are primary health centres at Gangajalghati (with 4 beds), Ramharipur (with 4 beds) and Srichandrapur (with 10 beds).

== See also ==
- Gangajalghati (Vidhan Sabha constituency)
