= Taldangra (community development block) =

- Community development block
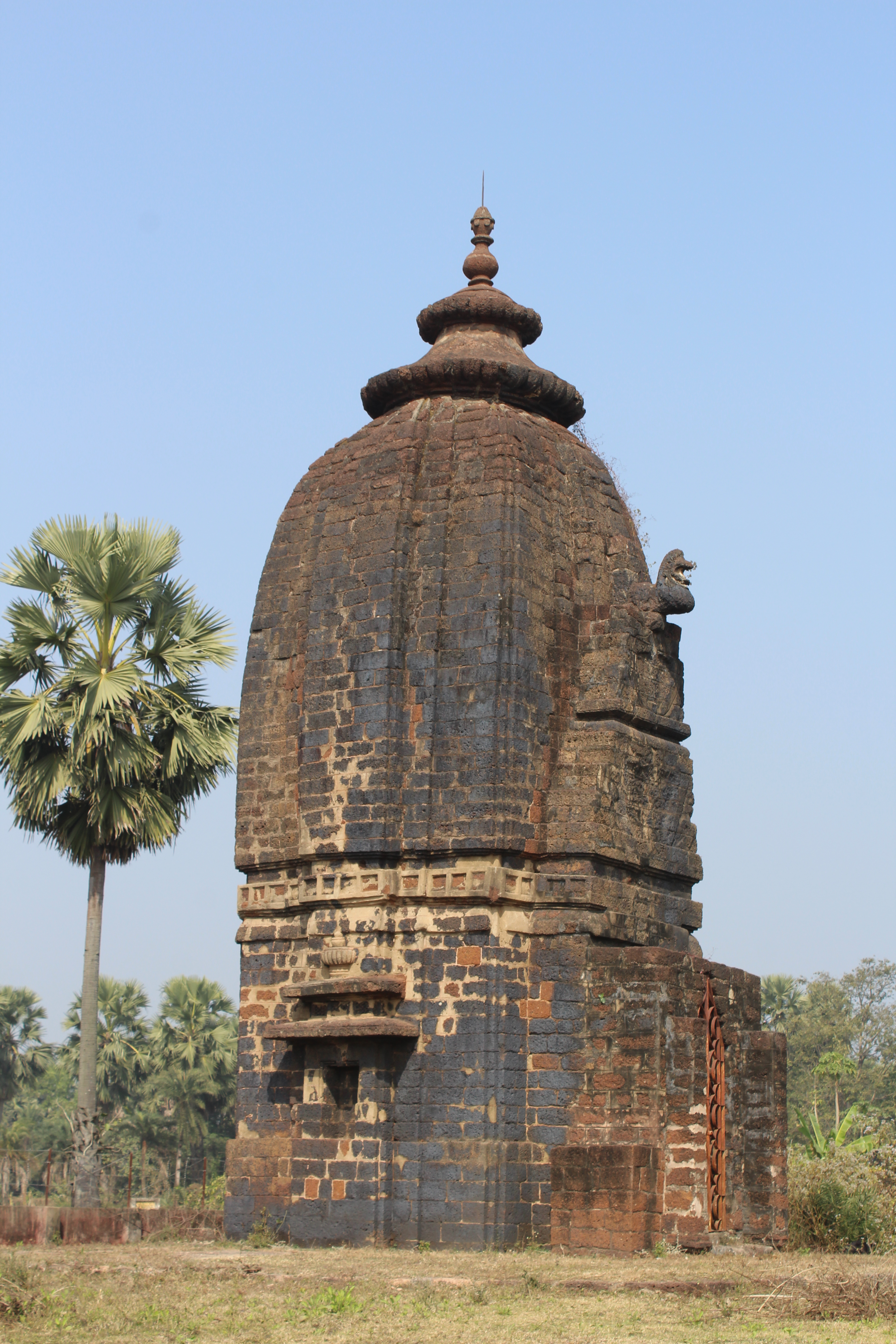
- Deulbhira Parshvanth temple

- Coordinates: 23.02°N 87.11°E
- Country: India
- State: West Bengal
- District: Bankura

Government
  - Type: Representative democracy

Area
  - Total: 349.70 km^{2} (135.02 sq mi)
- Elevation: 74 m (243 ft)

Population (2011)
  - Total: 147,893
  - Density: 422.91/km^{2} (1,095.3/sq mi)

Languages
  - Official: Bengali, Santali, English
- Time zone: UTC+5:30 (IST)
- PIN: 722152 (Taldangra); 722156 (Panchmura)
- Telephone/STD code: 03244
- ISO 3166 code: IN-WB
- Vehicle registration: WB-67, WB-68
- Literacy: 70.87%
- Lok Sabha constituency: Bankura, Bishnupur
- Vidhan Sabha constituency: Taldangra, Bishnupur
- Website: bankura.gov.in

Taldangra is a community development block (CD block) that forms an administrative division in the Khatra subdivision of the Bankura district in the Indian state of West Bengal.

== History ==
=== From Bishnupur kingdom to the British Raj ===
From around 7th century AD till around the advent of British rule, for around a millennium, history of Bankura district is identical with the rise and fall of the Hindu Rajas of Bishnupur. The Bishnupur Rajas, who were at the summit of their fortunes towards the end of the 17th century, started declining in the first half of the 18th century. First, the Maharaja of Burdwan seized the Fatehpur Mahal, and then the Maratha invasions laid waste their country.

Bishnupur was ceded to the British with the rest of Burdwan chakla in 1760. In 1787, Bishnupur was united with Birbhum to form a separate administrative unit. In 1793 it was transferred to the Burdwan collectorate. In 1879, the district acquired its present shape with the thanas of Khatra and Raipur and the outpost of Simplapal being transferred from Manbhum, and the thanas of Sonamukhi, Kotulpur and Indas being retransferred from Burdwan. However, it was known for sometime as West Burdwan and in 1881 came to be known as Bankura district.

== Geography ==
Map of Bankura District showing CD blocks and municipalities

Taldangra is located at 23°01′N 87°07′E.

Taldangra CD block is located in the south-eastern part of the district and belongs to the hard rock area.

Taldangra CD block is bounded by Onda CD block on the north, Bishnupur CD block and Garhbeta II CD block, in Paschim Medinipur district, on the east, Simlapal CD block on the south and Khatra and Indpur CD blocks on the west.

Taldangra CD block has an area of 349.74 km^{2}. It has 1 panchayat samity, 9 gram panchayats, 109 gram sansads (village councils), 145 mouzas and 141 inhabited villages. Taldangra police station serves this block. Headquarters of this CD block is at Taldangra.

Gram panchayats of Taldangra block/ panchayat samiti are: Amdangra, Bibarda, Fulmati, Harmasra, Khalagram, Panchmura, Saltora, Satmouli and Taldangra.

== Demographics ==
=== Population ===
According to the 2011 Census of India, Taldangra CD block had a total population of 147,893, all of which were rural. There were 74,999 (51%) males and 72,894 (49%) females. Population in the age range of 0 to 6 years was 17,848. Scheduled Castes numbered 38,903 (26.30%) and Scheduled Tribes numbered 20,597 (13.93%).

According to the 2001 census, Taldangra block had a total population of 128,748, out of which 65,679 were males and 63,069 were females. Taldangra block registered a population growth of 15.39 per cent during the 1991-2001 decade. Decadal growth for the district was 13.79 per cent. Decadal growth in West Bengal was 17.84 per cent.

Large villages (with 4,000+ population) in Taldangra CD block are (2011 census figures in brackets): Bibarda (5,399), Chenchurya (6,185) and Rajpur (7,497).

Other villages in Taldangra CD block are (2011 census figures in brackets): Taldangra (1,581), Satmouli (2,082), Panchmura (3,719), Phulmati (2,706), Harmasra (3,131) and Khalgram (1,486).

=== Literacy ===
According to the 2011 census, the total number of literates in Taldangra CD block was 92,168 (70.87% of the population over 6 years) out of which males numbered 53,006 (75.44% of the male population over 6 years) and females numbered 39,162 (55.81%) of the female population over 6 years). The gender disparity (the difference between female and male literacy rates) was 19.21%.

See also – List of West Bengal districts ranked by literacy rate

Literacy in CD blocks of
Bankura district
Bankura Sadar subdivision
Saltora – 61.45%
Mejia – 66.83%
Gangajalghati – 68.11%
Chhatna – 65.73%
Bankura I – 68.74%
Bankura II – 73.59%
Barjora – 71.67%
Onda – 65.82%
Bishnupur subdivision
Indas – 71.70%
Joypur – 74.57%
Patrasayer – 64.8%
Kotulpur – 78.01%
Sonamukhi – 66.16%
Bishnupur – 66.30%
Khatra subdivision
Indpur – 67.42%
Ranibandh – 68.53%
Khatra – 72.18%
Hirbandh – 64.18%
Raipur – 71.33%
Sarenga – 74.25%
Simlapal – 68.44%
Taldangra – 70.87%
2011 Census: CD Block Wise

Primary Census Abstract Data

=== Language and religion ===
Religion in Taldangra CD block (2011)
| Hinduism | 78.58% |
| Other (tribal religion) | 10.81% |
| Islam | 10.49% |
| Other or not stated | 0.12% |

In the 2011 census Hindus numbered 116,220 and formed 78.58% of the population in Taldangra CD block. Muslims numbered 15,508 and formed 10.49% of the population. Others numbered 16,165 and formed 10.93% of the population. Others include Addi Bassi, Marang Boro, Santal, Saranath, Sari Dharma, Sarna, Alchchi, Bidin, Sant, Saevdharm, Seran, Saran, Sarin, Kheria, and other religious communities. In 2001, Hindus were 78.13%, Muslims 8.88% and tribal religions 12.94% of the population respectively.

Languages of Taldangra CD block (2011)
1. Bengali (87.0%)
2. Santali (12.9%)
3. Others (0.04%)

At the time of the 2011 census, 87.04% of the population spoke Bengali and 12.92% Santali as their first language.

== Rural poverty ==
In Taldangra CD block 49.89% families were living below poverty line in 2007. According to the Rural Household Survey in 2005, 28.87% of the total number of families were BPL families in the Bankura district.

== Economy ==
=== Livelihood ===
Livelihood
in Taldangra CD block
1. Cultivators (21.9%)
2. Agricultural labourers (56.5%)
3. Household industries (3.58%)
4. Other Workers (18.0%)

In the Taldangra CD block in 2011, among the class of total workers, cultivators numbered 13,661 and formed 21.89%, agricultural labourers numbered 35,293 and formed 56.55%, household industry workers numbered 2,234 and formed 3.58% and other workers numbered 11,225 and formed 17.99%. Total workers numbered 62,413 and formed 42.20% of the total population, and non-workers numbered 85,480 and formed 57.80% of the population.

Note: In the census records a person is considered a cultivator, if the person is engaged in cultivation/ supervision of land owned by self/government/institution. When a person who works on another person's land for wages in cash or kind or share, is regarded as an agricultural labourer. Household industry is defined as an industry conducted by one or more members of the family within the household or village, and one that does not qualify for registration as a factory under the Factories Act. Other workers are persons engaged in some economic activity other than cultivators, agricultural labourers and household workers. It includes factory, mining, plantation, transport and office workers, those engaged in business and commerce, teachers, entertainment artistes and so on.

=== Infrastructure ===
There are 141 inhabited villages in the Taldangra CD block, as per the District Census Handbook, Bankura, 2011. 100% villages have power supply. 100% villages have drinking water supply. 27 villages (19.15%) have post offices. 119 villages (84.4%) have telephones (including landlines, public call offices and mobile phones). 30 villages (21.28%) have pucca (paved) approach roads and 61 villages (43.26%) have transport communication (includes bus service, rail facility and navigable waterways). 11 villages (7.80%) have agricultural credit societies and 7 villages (4.96%) have banks.

=== Agriculture ===
There were 63 fertiliser depots, 8 seed stores and 48 fair price shops in the Taldangra CD block.

In 2013-14, persons engaged in agriculture in Taldangra CD block could be classified as follows: bargadars 8.06%, patta (document) holders 17.16%, small farmers (possessing land between 1 and 2 hectares) 5.44%, marginal farmers (possessing land up to 1 hectare) 16.38% and agricultural labourers 52.97%.

In 2003-04 net area sown Taldangra CD block was 16,168 hectares and the area in which more than one crop was grown was 11,930 hectares.

In 2013-14, the total area irrigated in Taldangra CD block was 16,984 hectares, out of which 12,262 hectares was by canal water, 1,435 hectares by tank water, 1,300 hectares by river lift irrigation, 232 hectares by deep tubewell, 1,350 hectares by shallow tubewell, 5 hectares by open dug wells and 400 hectares by other methods.

In 2013-14, Taldangra CD block produced 4,429 tonnes of Aman paddy, the main winter crop, from 1,922 hectares, 4,424 tonnes of Aus paddy from 1,921 hectares, 1,474 tonnes of Boro paddy from 503 hectares, 549 tonnes of wheat from 329 hectares and 40,671,000 tonnes of potatoes from 879 hectares. It also produced pulses and mustard.

=== Handloom and pottery industries ===
The handloom industry engages the largest number of persons in the non farm sector and hence is important in Bankura district. The handloom industry is well established in all the CD blocks of the district and includes the famous Baluchari saris. In 2004-05 Taldangra CD Block had 395 looms in operation.

Bankura district is famous for the artistic excellence of its pottery products that include the famous Bankura horse. The range of pottery products is categorised as follows: domestic utilities, terracota and other decorative items and roofing tiles and other heavy pottery items. The terracotta and decorative items include horse, elephant, tiger, ox, flower vase, Mansa Saj, ash-tray and other items of religious use. These are produced in the following CD Blocks: Taldangra, Sonamukhi, Sarenga, Bankura I and Bankura II. Around 3,200 families were involved in pottery making in the district in 2002. 122 families were involved in Taldangra CD Block.

=== Banking ===
In 2013-14, Taldangra CD block had offices of 3 commercial banks and 5 gramin banks.

=== Backward Regions Grant Fund ===
The Bankura district is listed as a backward region and receives financial support from the Backward Regions Grant Fund. The fund, created by the Government of India, is designed to redress regional imbalances in development. As of 2012, 272 districts across the country were listed under this scheme. The list includes 11 districts of West Bengal.

== Transport ==
In 2013-14, Taldangra CD block had 10 originating/ terminating bus routes. The nearest railway station is 25 km from the CD lock headquarters.

The Kharagpur-Bankura-Adra line of South Eastern Railway passes through this CD block. There is a station at Piardoba.

National Highway 14, (old numbering NH 60), running from Morgram to Kharagpur, passes through this CD block.

State Highway 2 running from Bankura to Malancha (in North 24 Parganas district) and State Highway 9 running from Durgapur (in Paschim Bardhaman district) to Nayagram (in Jhargram district) pass through this CD block.

== Education ==
In 2013-14, Taldangra CD block had 172 primary schools with 12,132 students, 15 middle schools with 2,363 students, 10 high schools with 6,384 students and 15 higher secondary schools with 13,486 students. Taldangra CD block had 1 general college with 2,337 students, 3 professional/ technical institution with 486 students and 244 institutions for special and non-formal education with 7,237 students.

See also – Education in India

According to the 2011 census, in the Taldangra CD block, among the 141 inhabited villages, 16 villages did not have a school, 50 villages had two or more primary schools, 35 villages had at least 1 primary and 1 middle school and 18 villages had at least 1 middle and 1 secondary school.

Panchmura Mahavidyalaya was established at Panchmura in 1965.

== Healthcare ==
In 2014, Taldangra CD block had 1 rural hospital, 4 primary health centres and 1 private nursing home with total 74 beds and 11 doctors. It had 26 family welfare sub centres and 1 family welfare centre. 8,207 patients were treated indoor and 300,423 patients were treated outdoor in the hospitals, health centres and subcentres of the CD block.

Taldangra Rural Hospital, with 30 beds at Taldangra, is the major government medical facility in the Taldangra CD block. There are primary health centres at Harmasra (with 6 beds), Amdanga (Sabrakon) (with 10 beds), Panchmura (with 6 beds) and Bibarda (with 2 beds).
