= Gangajalghati =

- Village
- Location in West Bengal, India Gangajalghati (India)
- Coordinates: 23°25′12.0″N 87°07′12.0″E
- Country: India
- State: West Bengal
- District: Bankura

Population (2011)
  - Total: 8,708

Languages
  - Official: Bengali, English
- Time zone: UTC+5:30 (IST)
- PIN: 722 133 (Gangajalghati)
- Telephone/STD code: 03242
- Lok Sabha constituency: Bankura
- Vidhan Sabha constituency: Barjora
- Website: bankura.gov.in

Gangajalghati is a village in Gangajalghati CD block in the Bankura Sadar subdivision of the Bankura district in the state of West Bengal, India.

== Geography ==
Places in Bankura Sadar subdivision in Bankura district
M: municipal town/ city, CT: census town, R: rural/ urban centre, H: hill centre, T: temple/ religious centre, B: barrage
Owing to space constraints in the small map, the actual locations in a larger map may vary slightly

=== Location ===
Gangajalghati is located at 23°25′12.0″N 87°07′12.0″E.

=== Area overview ===
The map alongside shows the Bankura Sadar subdivision of Bankura district. Physiographically, this area is part of the Bankura Uplands in the west gradually merging with the Bankura-Bishnupur Rarh Plains in the north-east. The western portions are characterised by undulating terrain with many hills and ridges. The area is having a gradual descent from the Chota Nagpur Plateau. The soil is laterite red and hard beds are covered with scrub jungle and sal wood. Gradually it gives way to just uneven rolling lands but the soil continues to be lateritic. There are coal mines in the northern part, along the Damodar River. It is a predominantly rural area with 89% of the population living in rural areas and only 11% living in the urban areas.

Note: The map alongside presents some of the notable locations in the subdivision. All places marked in the map are linked in the larger full screen map.

== Demographics ==
According to 2011 Census of India, Gangajalghati had a total population of 8,708 of which 4,454 (51%) were males and 4,254 (49%) were females. Population below 6 years was 930. The total number of literates in Gangajalghati was 6,054 (77.83% of the population over 6 years).

== Civic administration ==
=== Police station ===
Gangajalghati police station has jurisdiction over Gangajalghati CD block. The area covered is 371.2 km^{2} and the population covered is 162,007.

== Transport ==
National Highway 14, (old numbering NH 60), running from Morgram to Kharagpur, passes through Gangajalghati.

== Education ==
Gangajalghati High School is a Bengali-medium coeducational institution established in 1884. It has facilities for teaching from class V to class XII. The school has 6 computers and a playground.

Gangajalghati Girls Junior High School is a Bengali-medium coeducational institution established in 2010. It has facilities for teaching from class V to class VIII.

Nityanandpur High School is a Bengali-medium coeducational institution established in 1952. It has facilities for teaching from class V to class XII. The school has 10 computers, a library with 500 books and a playground.

Gobindaprasad Mahavidyalaya was established in 1985 at Amarkanan. It is affiliated with the Bankura University and offers honours courses in Bengali, English, history and geography and a general course in arts.

== Healthcare ==
There is a primary health centre at Gangajalghati, with 4 beds.
