= Matkatpur =

- Village
- Location in West Bengal, India Matkatpur (India)
- Coordinates: 22°23′44.9″N 87°20′34.1″E
- Country: India
- State: West Bengal
- District: Paschim Medinipur

Population (2011)
  - Total: 1,895

Languages
  - Official: Bengali, English
- Time zone: UTC+5:30 (IST)
- Lok Sabha constituency: Medinipur
- Vidhan Sabha constituency: Kharagpur
- Website: paschimmedinipur.gov.in

Matkatpur (also called Matkadpur) is a village in Kharagpur I CD Block in Kharagpur subdivision of Paschim Medinipur district in the state of West Bengal, India.

== Demographics ==
As per 2011 Census of India Matkadpur had a total population of 1,895 of which 958 (51%) were males and 937 (49%) were females. Population below 6 years was 183. The total number of literates in Matkadpur was 1,296 (68.39% of the population over 6 years).

== Transport ==
NH 14, (old numbering NH 60), running from Morgram to Kharagpur, passes through Matkatpur.
