= Amarkanan =

- Village
- Location in West Bengal, India Amarkanan (India)
- Coordinates: 23°23′50.3″N 87°06′32.0″E
- Country: India
- State: West Bengal
- District: Bankura

Languages
  - Official: Bengali, English
- Time zone: UTC+5:30 (IST)
- Telephone/STD code: 03242
- Lok Sabha constituency: Bankura
- Vidhan Sabha constituency: Barjora
- Website: bankura.gov.in

Amarkanan is a village in the Gangajalghati CD block in the Bankura Sadar subdivision of the Bankura district in the state of West Bengal, India.

== Geography ==
Places in Bankura Sadar subdivision in Bankura district
M: municipal town/ city, CT: census town, R: rural/ urban centre, H: hill centre, T: temple/ religious centre, B: barrage
Owing to space constraints in the small map, the actual locations in a larger map may vary slightly

=== Location ===
Amarkanan is located at 23°23′50.3″N 87°06′32.0″E

=== Area overview ===
The map alongside shows the Bankura Sadar subdivision of Bankura district. Physiographically, this area is part of the Bankura Uplands in the west gradually merging with the Bankura-Bishnupur Rarh Plains in the north-east. The western portions are characterised by undulating terrain with many hills and ridges. The area is having a gradual descent from the Chota Nagpur Plateau. The soil is laterite red and hard beds are covered with scrub jungle and sal wood. Gradually it gives way to just uneven rolling lands but the soil continues to be lateritic. There are coal mines in the northern part, along the Damodar River. It is a predominantly rural area with 89% of the population living in rural areas and only 11% living in the urban areas.

Note: The map alongside presents some of the notable locations in the subdivision. All places marked in the map are linked in the larger full screen map.

== Civic administration ==
=== CD block HQ ===
The headquarters of Gangajalghati CD block are located at Amarkanan.

== Demographics ==
According to the 2011 census of India, Amarkanan is not mentioned separately. It is possibly included in adjacent Bhairabpur. As per 2011 Census of India Bhairabpur had a total population of 4,669 of which males were 2,379 (51%) and females wer 2,290 (40%). Population in the age group 0–6 years was 506.The total number of literate persons in Bhairabpur was 2,911 (69.93% of the population over 6 years).

== Transport ==
National Highway 14, (old numbering NH 60), running from Morgram to Kharagpur, passes through Amarkanan. In this sector, State Highway 8 from Santaldih (in Purulia district) to Majhdia (in North 24 Parganas) shares a common route with NH 14.

== Tourist spots ==
- Koro Hill:

The 400 feet high Koro Hill near Amarkanan is a major trekking and picnic attraction for tourists. It is 19 km from Bankura.

- Gangdua Dam:

The 4,900 feet dam across the Shali river, with a reservoir behind it, is a popular picnic spot. It is 4 km from Amarkanan and 28 km from Bankura.

== Education ==
Gobindaprasad Mahavidyalaya was established in 1985 to pay homage to Gobinda Prasad Singha, an Indian independence activist. It is affiliated to the Bankura University and offers honours courses in Bengali, English, history and geography and a general course in arts.

Amarkanan Deshbandhu Vidyalaya is a Bengali-medium coeducational institution established in 1939. It has facilities for teaching from class V to class XII. The school has 20 computers, a library with 711 books and a playground.

Shamayita Convent School, is an English-medium coeducational school established in 1986. It is a senior secondary school following the Central Board of Secondary Education syllabus.

== Healthcare ==
Gangajalgati (Amar Kanan) Rural Hospital, with 30 beds at PO Amarkanan, is the major government medical facility in the Gangjalghati CD block. There are primary health centres at Gangajalghati (with 4 beds), Ramharipur (with 4 beds) and Srichandrapur (with 10 beds).
