= Tridhara Milan mandir =

Hindu temple dedicated to Radha Krishna

- ত্রিধারা মিলন মন্দির
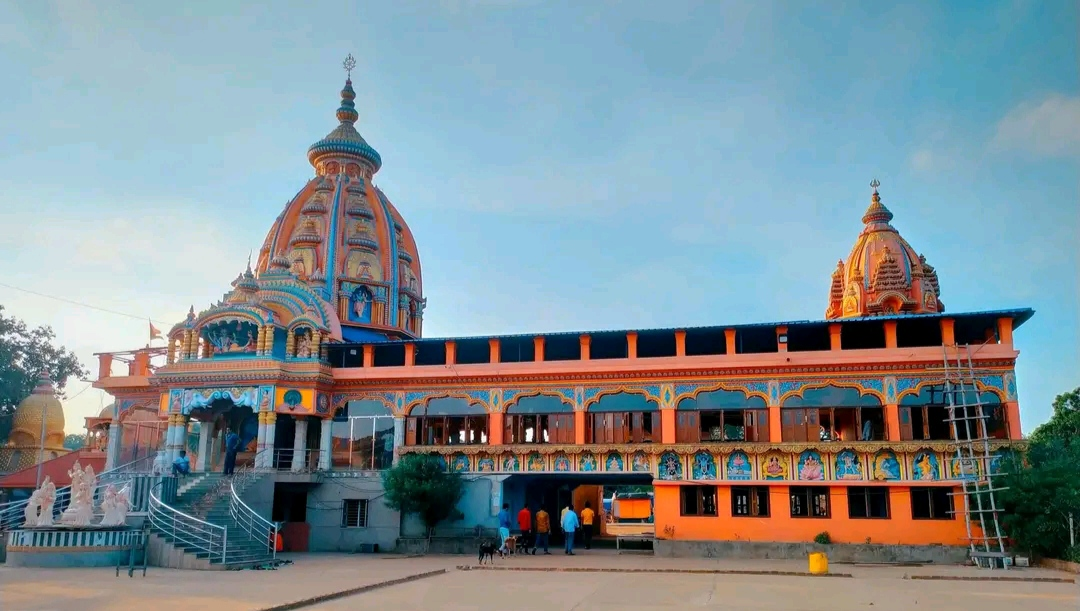
- Tridhara Milan mandir

- Location in West Bengal

Religion
- Affiliation: Hinduism
- District: Bankura
- Deity: Radha Krishna; Shiva; Kali; Ram; Sita; Bajrangbali; Rath Yatra; Radhashtami; Janmashtami; Holi; Hindu Wedding

Location
- Location: Panchmura
- State: West Bengal
- Country: India
- Interactive map of Tridhara Milan mandir
- Coordinates: 22°58′03″N 87°10′16″E

Architecture
- Established: 1 July 2022

Website
- Tridhara Milan mandir Prem Vihar - Official Website

Tridhara Milan mandir is a Hindu temple dedicated to the Hindu deities Radha & Krishna, in the form of Radha Krishna. Located in Panchmura, Bankura of West Bengal, it is sometimes also referred to as the Second Vrindavan and is a melting for the three major sects of Hinduism: Shaivism, Vaishnavism and Shaktism.

== Etymology ==
Tridhara Milan mandir often referred as Second Vrindavan and is situated at Panchmura under Taldangra police station in Bankura. The temple derived its name from the close relationship of love and devotion of the devotees with Krishna & Radha in this temple. Particularly, the term "Tridhara" originated from the fact that the temple is a melting pot and sangam for the three principle sects of beliefs of Hinduism - Shaivism (Shiva), Vaishnavism (Radha Krishna) and Shaktism (Kali).

== History ==
The temple was inaugurated on 1 July 2022. According to the lunisolar Hindu Bengali calendar, the date was 16th of the month of "Ashara", marking the auspicious day of Rathyatra.

== Deities ==
This temple is mainly dedicated to Lord Krishna & Radharani. Along with there are separate temples for other Hindu deities like Shiva, Kali, Ram, Sita, Hanuman and Chaitanya Mahaprabhu. The main temple houses the idols of Radha Krishna and Maa Kali. In front of it are two other temples. One of them is dedicated to Mahadev while the other one is dedicated to Ram - Sita. On the walls of the main temple of Krishna, there are various stone replicas of Lord Krishna and his Dasavatar engraved on the walls.

== The temple complex ==
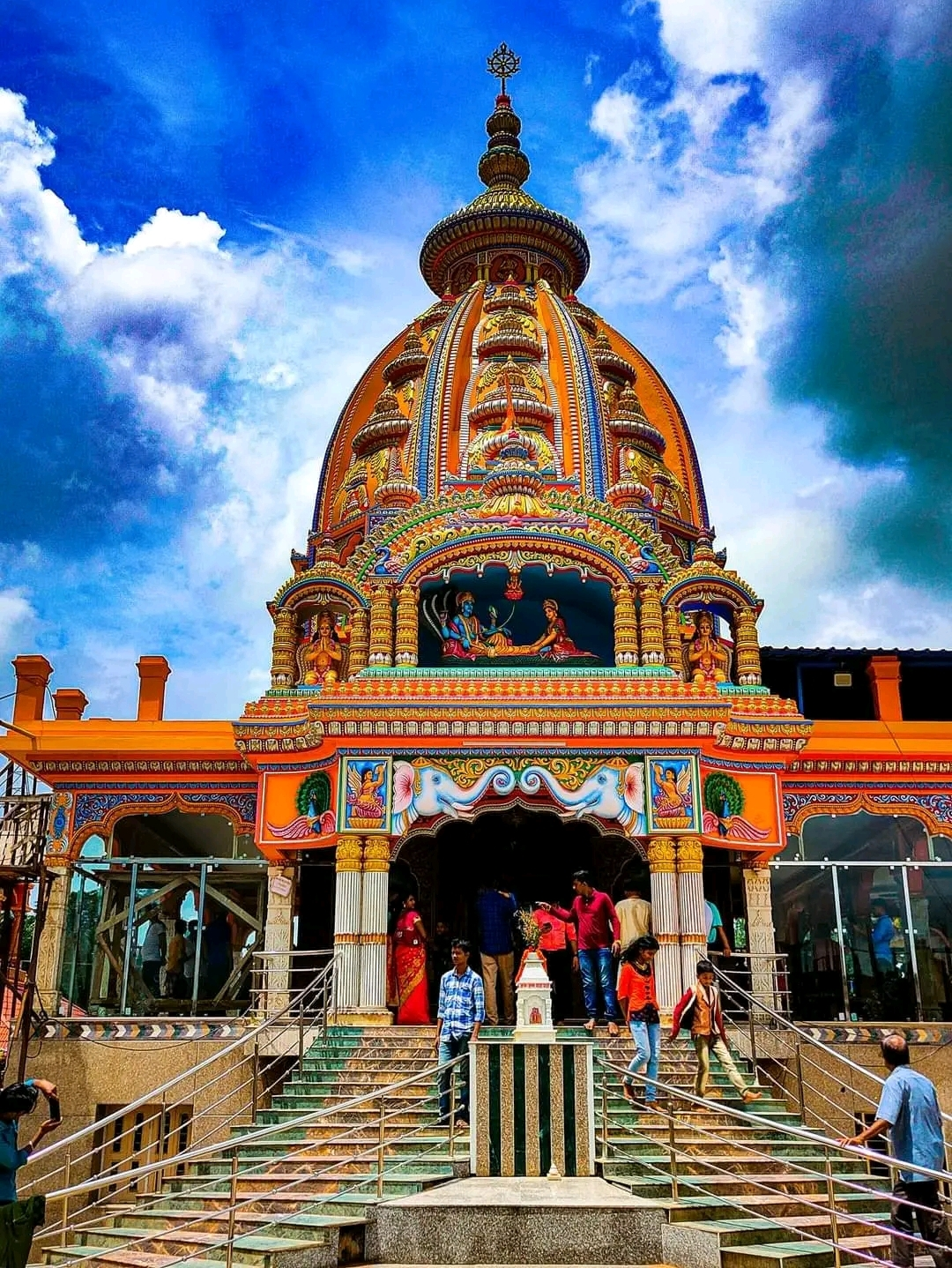
The entrance of Radha Krishna temple

There are three temples in the complex. The main temple houses the idols of Radha Krishna and Chaitanya Mahaprabhu. A smaller temple inside the principle temple houses the idol of Maa Kali. In front of it, one temple houses the idols of Ram - Sita and another temple houses a large statue of Mahadev in a meditating pose.

The ceiling is architectured from shegun kath and a large chandelier hangs from the ceiling. The walls around all the temples is carved with various scenes from the childhood of Krishna along with the spiritual "lila" Lord Krishna did during his avatar in the Dvapara Yuga. The type of architecture and size of the carved statues on walls resembles the Nagara architecture prevalent in Northern India more than the age-old teracotta temples of West Bengal of Bengal architecture.

The main temple has stairs from two sides and a centrally located "Tulsimancha", which can be worshipped at halfway from both the stairs. The idols of the deities are placed on "bedis" which are made from wood and the floor of all the temples are covered with marble stone. The deities of Radha Krishna and Chaitanya Mahaprabhu is made of Rajasthani marble. The statue of Shri Krishna is of dark complexion while the statue of Radharani is of white complexion.

There are caricatures featuring the Dashavatars of Vishnu, scenes of the Dev - Asur Sangram during the Samudra Manthana, Krishna preaching moral vanis to Arjuna before the Kurukshetra War in Mahabharata, Lord Narayana residing in his Vaikunth Dham with his wife Lakshmi and the lila of Chaitanya Mahaprabhu. On the front gate, there is a stone architected statue depicting the Vishwaroop of Vishnu. The shrine of the main temple is also engraved with various events from the Krishan Purana. There are several other statues of common devotees with khol and kartal in their hand, who are doing "kirtan" to preach to the people about Krishna and his divine "lila".

== Darshan and Prasad ==
Everyday the temple is opened for the visitors and devotees from morning to night. But it remains closed for 2 hours between 2 p.m. to 4 p.m., when bhog is served to the deities. Devotees can have the prasad for ₹51 per person. Initially started for 600 persons daily, presently 2000 devotees are served prasad daily. Apart from tourists from different parts of the district, people from outside the district also come to see this temple of Radha and Krishna.
