= Durlabhpur =

Durlabhpur Durlovpur
- Village
- Location in West Bengal, India Durlabhpur (India)
- Coordinates: 23°28′12.0″N 87°07′48.0″E
- Country: India
- State: West Bengal
- District: Bankura

Population (2011)
  - Total: 1,725

Languages
  - Official: Bengali, English
- Time zone: UTC+5:30 (IST)
- Lok Sabha constituency: Bankura
- Vidhan Sabha constituency: Saltora
- Website: bankura.gov.in

Durlabhpur (also spelled Durlovpur) is a village in the Gangajalghati CD block in the Bankura Sadar subdivision of the Bankura district in the state of West Bengal, India.

== Geography ==
Places in Bankura Sadar subdivision in Bankura district
M: municipal town/ city, CT: census town, R: rural/ urban centre, H: hill centre, T: temple/ religious centre, B: barrage
Owing to space constraints in the small map, the actual locations in a larger map may vary slightly

=== Location ===
Durlabhpur is located at 23°28′12.0″N 87°07′48.0″E

=== Area overview ===
The map alongside shows the Bankura Sadar subdivision of Bankura district. Physiographically, this area is part of the Bankura Uplands in the west gradually merging with the Bankura-Bishnupur Rarh Plains in the north-east. The western portions are characterised by undulating terrain with many hills and ridges. The area is having a gradual descent from the Chota Nagpur Plateau. The soil is laterite red and hard beds are covered with scrub jungle and sal wood. Gradually it gives way to just uneven rolling lands but the soil continues to be lateritic. There are coal mines in the northern part, along the Damodar River. It is a predominantly rural area with 89% of the population living in rural areas and only 11% living in the urban areas.

Note: The map alongside presents some of the notable locations in the subdivision. All places marked in the map are linked in the larger full screen map.

== Demographics ==
According to the 2011 Census of India Durlabhpur had a total population of 1,725 of which 894 (52%) were males and 831 (48%) were females. Population below 6 years was 172. The total number of literates in Durlovpur was 1086 (69.93% of the population over 6 years).

== Economy ==
=== Mejia Thermal Power Station ===
In 1996, Mejia Thermal Power Station was set up by Damodar Valley Corporation at Durlabhpur. It has an installed capacity of 2340 MW – 4 units of 210 MW each, 2 units of 250 MW each and 2 units of 500 MW each.

=== Lafarge cement ===
Nuvoco Cements, manufacturer of Lafarge cement products, is located at Murra, nearby.

== Transport ==
National Highway 14, (old numbering NH 60), running from Morgram to Kharagpur, and Durgapur-Purulia Road pass through Durlavpur.

== Education ==
DAV Public School is an English-medium coeducational institution established in 1997. It is a senior secondary school following the Central Board of Secondary Education syllabus.

Latiaboni Anchal High School is a Bengali-medium coeducational institution established in 1964. It has facilities for teaching from class V to class XII. The school has 18 computers, a library with 920 books and a playground.

St. Johns School is an English-medium coeducational school established in 1990. It has facilities for teaching from class I to class VIII.
