= State Highway 2 (West Bengal) =

Road in West Bengal, India

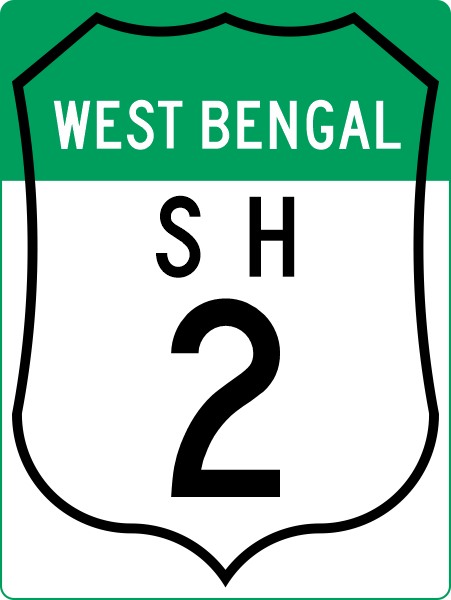
State Highway 2

Route information
- Length: 323 km (201 mi)

Major junctions
- From: Bankura
- SH 4 from Hatirampur to Khatra; SH 9 from Simlapal to Taldangra; SH 7 at Arambag; SH 15 from Champadanga to Tarakeswar; NH 19/ Durgapur Expressway at Singur; SH 13 (Delhi Road) from Baidyabati to Dankuni; Belghoria Expressway from Dankuni to Dunlop; SH 6 (Grand Trunk Road) at Bally; Barrackpore Trunk Road from Baranagar (Dunlop) to Barrackpore; SH 1 from Barrackpore to Barasat; NH 12 from Dum Dum to Barasat; SH 3 at Khotapota
- To: Malancha

Location
- Country: India
- State: West Bengal
- Districts: Bankura, Hooghly, North 24 Parganas

Highway system
- Roads in India; Expressways; National; State; Asian; State Highways in West Bengal

State Highway 2 (SH 2) is a state highway in West Bengal, India.

== Route ==
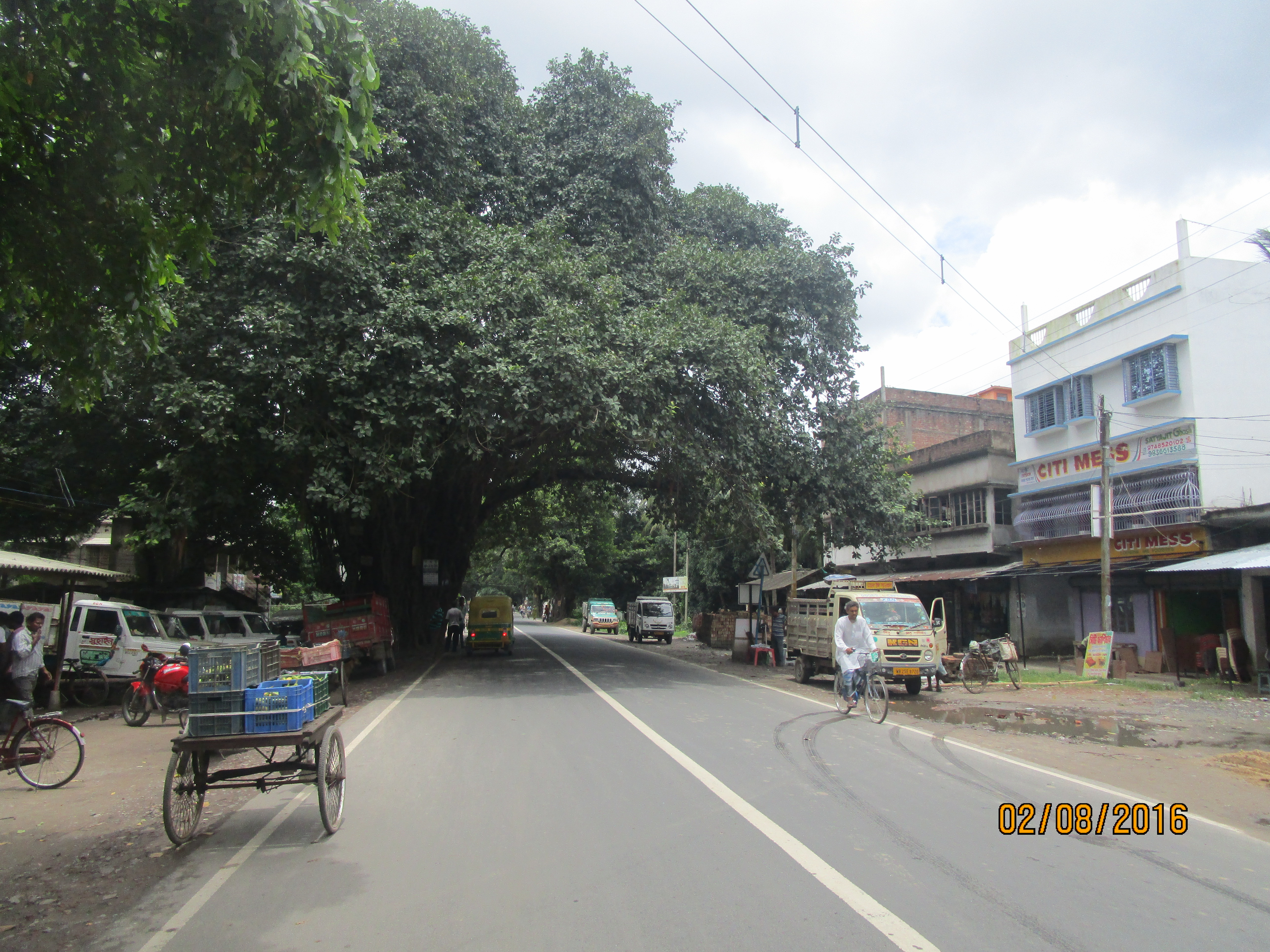
SH 2 at Kajibari, Uttarpara, Barasat

SH 2 originates from its junction with NH 14 at Bankura and passes through Indpur, Hatimrampur, Khatra, Simlapal, Taldangra, Bishnupur, Jaypur, Kotulpur, Arambag, Champadanga, Tarakeswar, Singur, Baidyabati, Dankuni, Uttarpara, Baranagar, Dakshineswar, Barrackpore, Barasat, Berachampa, Kholapota, Basirhat, Taki and terminates at its junction with SH 3 at Malancha in North 24 Parganas district.

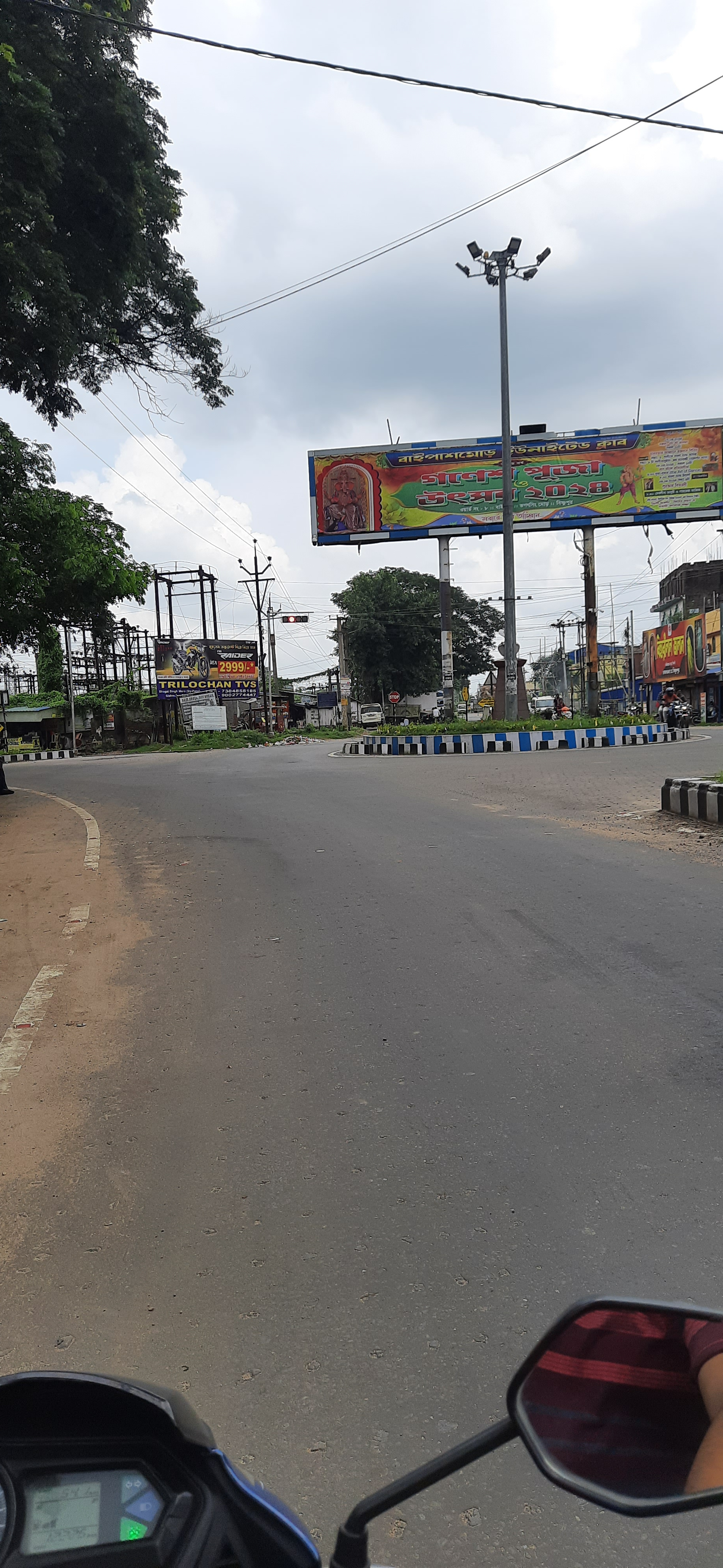
State Highway 2 Bishnupur Bypass

National Highway Authority of India or NHAI has proposed to include section of SH 2 from Simlapal via Taldangra, Bishnupur, Jaypur, Kotulpur, Arambag to Champadanga under a new National Highway for 2022/23, but details not decided yet. The new highway will connect Jhargram with Dankuni via Jhilimili, Mukutmanipur, Simlapal, Taldangra, Bishnupur, Jaypur, Kotulpur, Arambag, Champadanga & Chanditala. The new proposed National Highway will merge SH 2, SH 5 & SH 15 into a single route covering distance of 296 kilometres (184 mi).

The total length of SH 2 is 323 km.

Districts traversed by SH 2 are:
Bankura district (0 - 117 km)
Hooghly district (117 - 196 km)
North 24 Parganas (196 - 323 km)

== Road sections ==
It is divided into different sections as follows:

Road Section	District	CD Block	Length (km)
Bankura-Khatra	Bankura	Bankura I, Indpur, Hirbandh, Khatra	45
Khatra Morh-Daldanga-Chenchuria	Bankura	Simlapal, Taldangra	22
Chenchuria-Onda-Ramsagar-Bishnupur	Bankura	Onda, Bishnupur,	24
Bishnupur Bye-Pass	Bankura	Bishnupur	5
Bishnupur-Joypur-Mirzapur-Kotulpur	Bankura	Joypur, Kotulpur	36
Kotulpur-Khatul-Gobindapur-Arambagh	Hooghly	Goghat II, Goghat I, Arambagh	18
Arambagh-Joyrampur-Mayapur-Sayedpur-Champadanga	Hooghly	Pursurah, Tarakeswar	21
Champadanga-Tarakeswar-Bandipur-Singur-Baidyabati	Hooghly	Haripal, Singur	40
Baidyabati-Sheoraphuli-Serampore-Uttarpara	Hooghly	Sreerampur Uttarpara	18
Uttarpara-Dakshineshwar-Baranagar (Dunlop)-Kamarhati-Khardaha-Titagarh-Barrackpore (Baranagar-Barrackpore B.T Road)	North 24 Parganas	Barrackpore II	12
Barrackpore-Nilganj-Jagannathpur-Barasat	North 24 Parganas	Barasat II	13
Barasat-Kazipara-Kadambagachi-Golabari-Deganga-Berachampa-Gopalpur More-Kholapota-Basirhat-Taki	North 24 Parganas	Deganga, Basirhat II, Basirhat I	62
Taki-Makhalgacha-Murarisha-Chaital-Malancha	North 24 Parganas	Hasnabad	22

== See also ==
- List of state highways in West Bengal
