= Manasa chali =

Type of idol of Debi Manasa in India

Manasa chali Bankura Panchmura Terracotta Craft
- Geographical indication
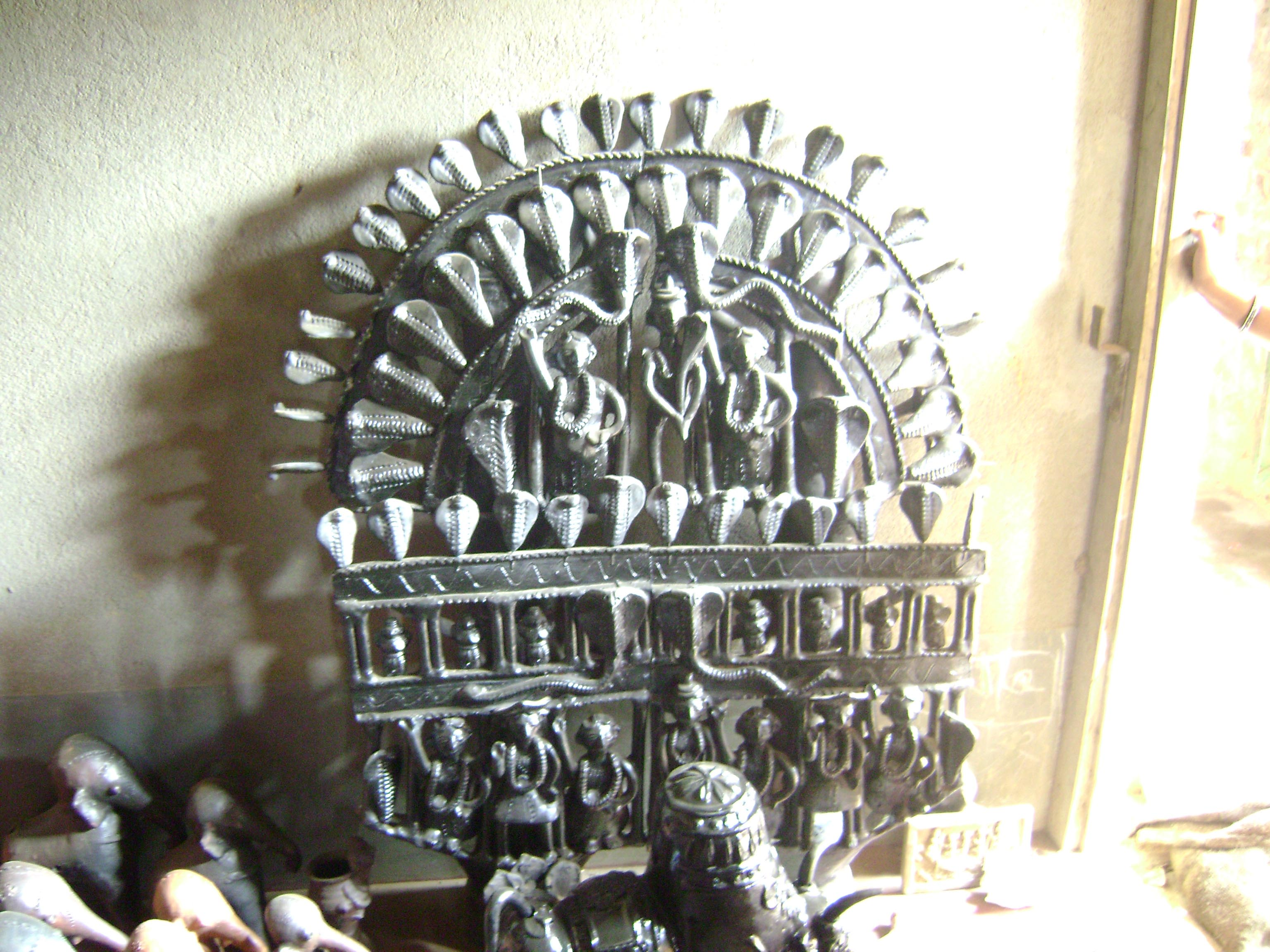
- Manasa chali
- Description: Manasa chali is a famous terracotta arts of West Bengal
- Type: Arts of West Bengal
- Area: Panchmura, Bankura, West Bengal, India
- Country: India
- Registered: 28 March 2018; 7 years ago
- Material: Clay
- Official website: ipindiaservices.gov.in

Manasa chali, or Manasa bari, is a type of idol of Debi Manasa made of Terracota in Panchmura, West Bengal, India. It typically features a small figure or a group of three figures in the middle with rows of snake hoods fanning out in a half moon shape. Chali or bari is Bengali for 'the shade of something'. Chali is referred to here as 'the shade of idol' or 'the besh of idol', like Chalchitra. These idols have two basic colors, reddish-yellow and black.

== Object of worship ==
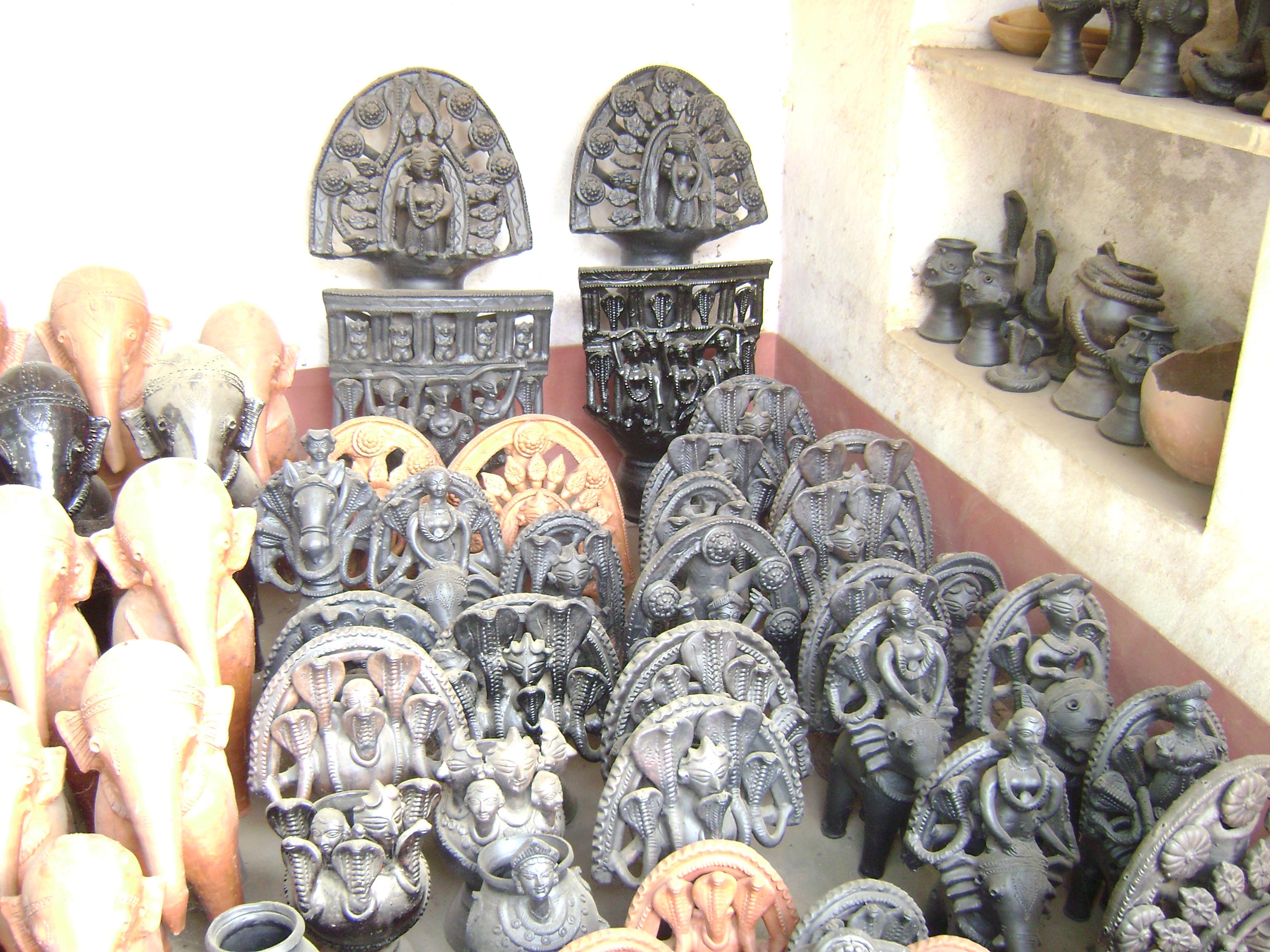
Manasa chali of Panchmura

Manasa, the snake deity, is worshiped primarily for protection from snakebites. The story of Chand Saudagar (The Devotee of Shiva) is well known throughout the Bankura district. Manasa Chali and the Manasa Ghat are worshiped in Panchmura.

== Geographical Indications ==
Manasa chali is registered under the Geographical Indications of West Bengal, named Bankura Panchmura Terracota Craft on 28 March 2018.

== See also ==
- Bankura horse
- Crafts of India
- Pottery in the Indian subcontinent
