= State Highway 12 (West Bengal) =

Road in West Bengal, India

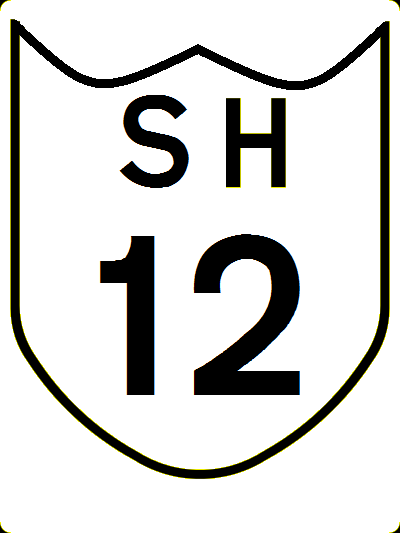
State Highway 12

Route information
- Length: 352 km (219 mi)

Major junctions
- From: Naxalbari
- NH 327/ AH 2 at Naxalbari common route starts East-West Highway (Nepal) at Panitanki; NH 327 common route ends at Dohaguri; NH 327 link at Kharibari; NH 27 at Ghoshpukur; NH 27 (Ghoshpukur-Fulbari Bypass) at Mahammadbaksa; NH 27 common route till Matigara; NH 10 common route till Khaprail More at Matigara; Phikkal-Pasupatinagar Road near Pasupatinagar (Nepal); Road to Manebhanjhang at Simanabasti; NH 110 Junction; NH 10 Junction near Teesta Bridge; NH 17 common route starts at Damdim; Jaldhaka Bridge at Nagrakata; NH 517 Junction at Telipara; NH 17 common route ends at Birpara; NH 317 common route starts at Birpara; NH 317 common route ends at Madarihat; NH 17 and NH 27 Junction at Falakata; NH 17 and NH 27 common route ends NH 17 separates at Sonarpur; NH 27 separates and moves in the direction of Kamakhyaguri; NH 27 Junction
- To: Alipurduar

Location
- Country: India
- State: West Bengal
- Districts: Darjeeling, Kalimpong, Jalapaiguri, Alipurduar

Highway system
- Roads in India; Expressways; National; State; Asian; State Highways in West Bengal

State Highway 12 (West Bengal) is a state highway in West Bengal, India.

== Route ==
SH 12 originates from Naxalbari and passes through Kharibari, Phansidewa, Matigara, Mirik, Sukhiapokhri, Ghum, Peshok, Teesta Valley, Kalimpong, Algarah, Labha, Gorubathan. Damdim, Chalsa, Madarihat, Falakata, Sonapur before terminating to NH-27 through Kamakhyaguri Alipurduar.

The total length of SH 12 is 352 km.

Districts traversed by SH 12 are: Darjeeling district, Kalimpong district, Jalpaiguri district, Alipurduar district.

== Road sections ==
It is divided into different sections as follows:.

Road Section	District	CD Block	Length (km)
Naxalbari-Kharibari-Phansidewa	Darjeeling	Naxalbari, Kharibari, Phansidewa	39
Phansidewa-Matigara-Garidhua	Darjeling	Matigara, Kurseong	32
Garidhura-Mirik-Simana	Darjeeling	Mirik, Jorebunglow Sukhiapokhri	52
Simana-Ghum-Peshok-Teesta Valley	Darjeeling	Darjeeling Pulbazar, Rangli Rangliot	50
Lower Rishi	Kalimpong	Kalimpong I	15
Upper Rishi	Kalimpong	Kalimpong I	15
Kalimpong-Algara-Damdim	Kalimpong	Kalimpong II, Gorubathan	70
Damdim-Chalsa-Madarihat (via NH)	Jalpaiguri	Mal, Maynaguri	-
Falakata-Sonapur-Alipurduar	Alipurduar	Madarihat Birpara, Falakata, Alipurduar I	34
Alipurduar-kamakhyaguri	Alipurduar	-	23

== See also ==
- List of state highways in West Bengal
