= Panchmura =

- Village
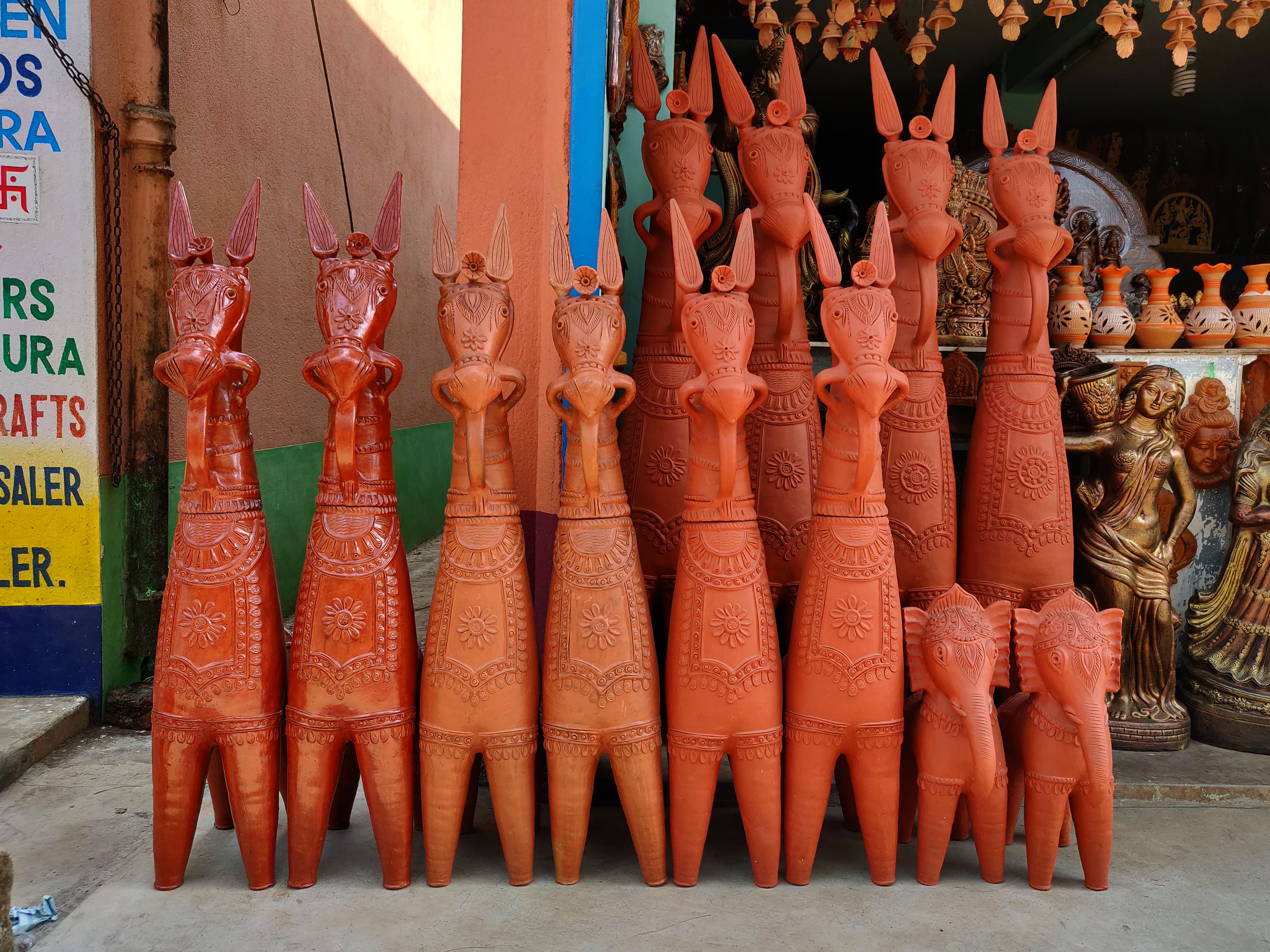
- Bankura horses

- Location in West Bengal, India Panchmura (India)
- Coordinates: 22.9667°N 87.1667°E
- Country: India
- State: West Bengal
- District: Bankura

Government
  - Type: Panchayati raj (India)
  - Body: Gram panchayat

Population (2011)
  - Total: 3,719

Languages*
  - Official: Bengali, Santali, English
- Time zone: UTC+5:30 (IST)
- ISO 3166 code: IN-WB
- Vehicle registration: WB
- Lok Sabha constituency: Bankura
- Vidhan Sabha constituency: Taldangra
- Website: wb.gov.in

Panchmura is a gram panchayat under Taldangra intermediate panchayat, in Khatra subdivision of Bankura district in the Indian state of West Bengal. It is 21 km (13 mi) from Bishnupur and is known for the terracotta Bankura horse, a folk artefact and the national symbol for Indian handicrafts.

== Geography ==
Places in Khatra subdivision in Bankura district
CT: census town, R: rural/ urban centre, C: craft centre, T: ancient/ temple centre
Owing to space constraints in the small map, the actual locations in a larger map may vary slightly

=== Location ===
Panchmura is located at 22.9667°N 87.1667°E. It has an average elevation of 68 m (223 ft).

Note: The map alongside presents some of the notable locations in the subdivision. All places marked in the map are linked in the larger full screen map.

Census villages under Panchmura gram panchayat are as follows: Adhkara, Amjor, Banskopa, Bhetuadanga, Chakiambedia, Danduria, Deulbhira, Dhobajor, Jambedia, Jaypur, Kanaipur, Kukutia, Lalbandh, Nutangram, Panchmura, Radhanagar, Rasiagara, Shyamsundarpur, Tatar

== Demographics ==
As per 2011 Census of India Panchmura had a total population of 3,719 of which 1,854 (50%) were males and 1,865 (50%) were females. Population below 6 years was 425. The total number of literates in Panchmura was 2,525 (76.65% of the population over 6 years).

.*For language details see Taldangra (community development block)#Language and religion

== Terracotta craft ==
=== Bankura horse ===
The terracotta Bankura horse, the logo of All India Handicrafts, and an item which now adorns drawing rooms across the world as symbols of Indian folk-art, is produced in Panchmura.

=== Manasa chali ===
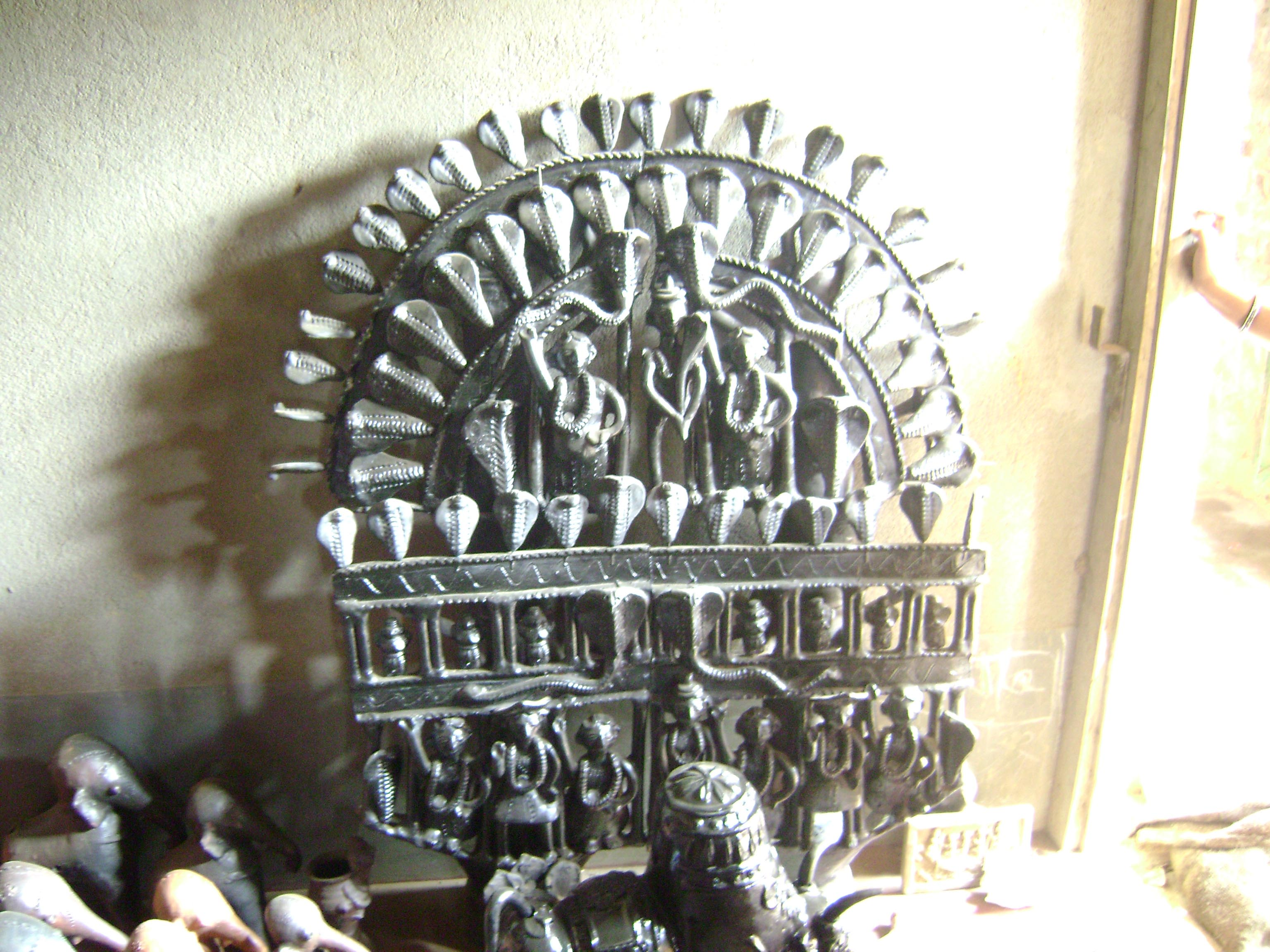
Manasa chali of Panchmura

Manasa chali is the idol of Debi Manasa. It is a unique terracotta sculpture of Panchmura, West Bengal. Manasa chali has a small figure or a group of three figures in the middle, with rows of snake hoods fanning out in a half moon shape.

== Education ==
Panchmura Mahavidyalaya is a general degree college established in 1965 with the efforts of local people led by Dr. Pasupati Mandal. It offers honours courses in Bengali, English, Sanskrit, Geography, History, Political Science, Philosophy, Economics, Chemistry, Mathematics and Accountancy, and general courses in arts, science and commerce. It is affiliated with the Bankura University.

Panchmura High School, is a Bengali-medium coeducational institution established in 1924. It has facilities for teaching from class V to class XII. The school has 11 computers, a library with 300 books and a playground.
