= Panchmura Mahavidyalaya =

College in Panchmura, West Bengal, India

- Type: Undergraduate college
- Established: 1965; 61 years ago
- Affiliations: Bankura University
- President: Arup Chakraborty
- Principal: Dr. Anal Biswas
- Location: Panchmura, West Bengal, 722156, India; 22.977251°N 87.1713317°E
- Campus: Rural
- Website: Panchmura Mahavidyalaya
- Location within West Bengal Location within India

Panchmura Mahavidyalaya, established in 1965, is the first rural general college in Panchmura, Taldangra Block, Bankura district, India. It offers undergraduate as well as post-graduate courses in arts, sciences, commerce and Physical Education. In total, it offers seventeen honours courses, three general degree courses and three post-graduate courses under CBCS. It is affiliated to Bankura University.

== Departments ==
=== Science ===
- Chemistry
- Computer Science
- Environmental Science
- Mathematics
- Physics

=== Arts and Commerce ===
- Bengali
- English
- Sanskrit
- Santali
- Education
- Geography
- History
- Political Science
- Philosophy
- Physical Education
- Economics
- Accountancy

Post-graduate courses

- M.A. in Bengali
- M.A. in History
- M.Sc. in Mathematics

== Accreditation ==
Panchmura Mahavidyalaya has been re-accredited by the National Assessment and Accreditation Council (NAAC) and awarded with B++ grade (CGPA 2.71) in the year of 2016. As per the NAAC PEER TEAM report, Panchmura Mahavidyalaya is one of the best rural college in India. The college is also recognized by the University Grants Commission (UGC) under 12B and 2f.

== See also ==
- List of institutions of higher education in West Bengal
- Education in India
- Education in West Bengal
