= Malancha, Basirhat =

Town in Basirhat subdivision, West Bengal, India

Malancha
- Village
- Location in West Bengal, India Malancha (India)
- Coordinates: 22.508231°N 88.768858°E
- Country: India
- State: West Bengal
- District: North 24 Parganas

Population (2011)
  - Total: 2,610

Languages
  - Official: Bengali, English
- Time zone: UTC+5:30 (IST)
- PIN: 743425 (Malancha)
- Telephone/STD code: 03217
- Lok Sabha constituency: Basirhat
- Vidhan Sabha constituency: Minakhan
- Website: north24parganas.nic.in

Malancha is a town in the Minakhan CD block in the Basirhat subdivision of the North 24 Parganas district in the state of West Bengal, India.

== Geography ==
Cities, towns and locations in Basirhat subdivision, North 24 Parganas district
MC: Municipal City, M: municipal town, CT: census town, R: rural/ urban centre
Owing to space constraints in the small map, the actual locations in a larger map may vary slightly

=== Location ===
Malancha is located at 22.508231°N 88.768858°E.

=== Area overview ===
The area shown in the map is a part of the Ichhamati-Raimangal Plain, located in the lower Ganges Delta. It contains soil of mature black or brownish loam to recent alluvium. Numerous rivers, creeks and khals criss-cross the area. The tip of the Sundarbans National Park is visible in the lower part of the map (shown in green but not marked). The larger full screen map shows the full forest area. A large section of the area is a part of the Sundarbans settlements. The densely populated area is an overwhelmingly rural area. Only 12.96% of the population lives in the urban areas and 87.04% of the population lives in the rural areas.

Note: The map alongside presents some of the notable locations in the subdivision. All places marked in the map are linked in the larger full screen map.

== Demographics ==
According to the 2011 Census of India, Malancha had a total population of 2,610, of which 1,399 (51%) were males and 1,271 (49%) were females. Population in the age range 0–6 years was 401. The total number of literate persons in Malancha was 1,607 (72.75% of the population over 6 years).

== Transport ==
The originating/ starting point of State Highway 2 is at its junction with State Highway 3 at Malancha.

== Fish market ==
Malancha has one of the largest fish markets in south Bengal, where about 15,000 kg of fish is auctioned every day. There are at least 15 such wholesale fish markets in south Bengal, all supplying fish to cities like Kolkata, Basirhat, Asansol, Durgapur, Kharagpur and nearby areas.
