= Hatirampur, Bankura =

Hatirampur
- Village
- Location in West Bengal, India Hatirampur (India)
- Coordinates: 23°03′47.8″N 86°52′38.2″E
- Country: India
- State: West Bengal
- District: Bankura

Government
  - Type: Panchayati raj (India)
  - Body: Gram panchayat

Languages
  - Official: Bengali, Santali, English
- Time zone: UTC+5:30 (IST)
- Vehicle registration: WB-

Hatirampur is a village in Bankura district. It falls under the jurisdiction of Hirbandh Community Development Block and Shankha Subhra Dey is the Block Development officer of the block.

== Education ==
Located in the center of Hatirampur and Baharamuri village, Hirbandh [KHATRA-II] block and is a Bengali-medium coeducational institution established in 1970. It has facilities for teaching from class V to class XII. The school has 10 computers and a library with 1,900 books.
