= Taldangra =

- Village
- Location in West Bengal, India Taldangra (India)
- Coordinates: 23°01′12.0″N 87°06′36.0″E
- Country: India
- State: West Bengal
- District: Bankura

Population (2011)
  - Total: 1,581

Languages
  - Official: Bengali
  - Additional official: English
- Time zone: UTC+5:30 (IST)
- PIN: 722152 (Taldangra)
- Telephone/STD code: 03244
- Lok Sabha constituency: Bankura
- Vidhan Sabha constituency: Taldangra
- Website: bankura.gov.in

Taldangra is a village in the Taldangra CD block in the Khatra subdivision of the Bankura district in the state of West Bengal, India.

== Geography ==
Places in Khatra subdivision in Bankura district
CT: census town, R: rural/ urban centre, C: craft centre, T: ancient/ temple centre
Owing to space constraints in the small map, the actual locations in a larger map may vary slightly

=== Location ===
Taldangra is located at 23°01′12.0″N 87°06′36.0″E.

=== Area overview ===
The map alongside shows the Khatra subdivision of Bankura district. Physiographically, this area is having uneven lands with hard rocks. In the Khatra CD block area there are some low hills. The Kangsabati project reservoir is prominently visible in the map. The subdued patches of shaded area in the map show forested areas It is an almost fully rural area.

Note: The map alongside presents some of the notable locations in the subdivision. All places marked in the map are linked in the larger full screen map.

== Demographics ==
According to the 2011 Indian Census, Taldangra had a total population of 1,581, of which 792 were males and 789 were females. Population within the age group of 0 to 6 years was 140. The total number of literates in Taldangra was 1,154, which constituted 73% of the population with male literacy of 81% and female literacy of 65%. The effective literacy rate of 7+ population of Taldangra was 80.1%, of which male literacy rate was 87.8% and female literacy rate was 72.1%. The Scheduled Castes population was 337. Taldangra had 354 households in 2011.

== Civic administration ==
=== Police station ===
Taldangra police station has jurisdiction over the Taldangra CD block. The area covered is 349.7 km^{2}with a population of 128,748.

=== CD block HQ ===
The headquarters of the Taldangra CD block are located at Taldangra.

== Education ==
Taldangra Fulmoti High School, is a Bengali-medium coeducational institution established in 1956. It has facilities for teaching from class V to class XII. The school has 1 computer, a library with 2,956 books and a playground. This is one of the fourteen schools in Bankura district in which the opening of an Olchiki medium section (for Santali language) from class V was sanctioned in 2012.

Taldangra Girls High School, is a Bengali-medium girls only institution established in 1996. It has facilities for teaching from class V to class XII. The school has 15 computers, a library with 800 books and a playground. This is one of the fourteen schools in Bankura district in which the opening of an Olchiki medium section (for Santali language) from class V was sanctioned in 2012.

Sarala Pakurdiha High School, is a Bengali-medium coeducational institution established in 2001. It has facilities for teaching from class V to class X. The school has 10 computers and a library with 40 books.

Panchmura Mahavidyalaya is a general degree college established at Panchmura in 1965 with the efforts of local people led by Dr. Pasupati Mandal. It offers honours courses in Bengali, English, Sanskrit, history, political science, philosophy, economics, chemistry, mathematics and accountancy, and general courses in arts, science and commerce. It is affiliated with the Bankura University.

== Healthcare ==
Taldangra Rural Hospital, with 30 beds at Taldangra, is the major government medical facility in the Taldangra CD block. There are primary health centres at Harmasra (with 6 beds), Amdanga (Sabrakon) (with 10 beds), Panchmura (with 6 beds) and Bibarda (with 2 beds).
