= Gobinda Prasad Mahavidyalaya =

College in West Bengal

- Type: Undergraduate college Public college
- Established: 1985; 41 years ago
- Affiliations: Bankura University
- Location: Amarkanan, West Bengal, 722133, India; 23.4070849°N 87.1037577°E
- Campus: Urban
- Website: Gobinda Prasad Mahavidyalaya
- Location in West Bengal Gobinda Prasad Mahavidyalaya (India)

Gobinda Prasad Mahavidyalaya, established in 1985, is the general degree college in Amarkanan, Gangajalghati Block, Bankura district. It offers undergraduate courses in arts. It is affiliated to Bankura University.

== About ==
Gobindaprasad Mahavidyalaya was established in 1985. First it was affiliated to University of Burdwan, later it was affiliated to Bankura University. Gobinda Prasad Mahavidyalaya was named after Gobinda Prasad Singha, he was a laurette, an eminent freedom fighter and social worker of Bankura district, whose patriotism has left a significant role Indian national movement. His fight against the British has made him memorable to the people of Bankura, who still loves to cherish the memories of Gobinda Prasad with great awe.

== Departments ==
Gobindaprasad Mahavidyalaya offers Undergraduate Degree in various subjects.

=== Arts ===
==== Major Subjects ====
- Bengali (Honours/ Honours with Research)
- English (Honours/ Honours with Research)
- Geography (Honours/ Honours with Research)
- History (Honours/ Honours with Research)
- Political Science (Honours/ Honours with Research)
- Education (Honours/ Honours with Research)
- Physical Education & Sports (Honours/ Honours with Research)

==== Minor Subjects ====
- Bengali
- Economics
- Education
- English
- Geography
- History
- Mathematics
- Philosophy
- Physical Education and Sports
- Poliiacal Science

== Accreditation ==
The college is recognized by the University Grants Commission (UGC).

== See also ==
- List of institutions of higher education in West Bengal
- Education in India
- Education in West Bengal
