= Bankura University =

Public university in Bankura, West Bengal, India

- Motto: uttiṣṭhata jāgrata
- Motto in English: Arise, awake
- Type: Public State University
- Established: 2014; 12 years ago
- Accreditation: NAAC
- Academic affiliations: UGC; AIU; BCI
- Budget: ₹17.03 crore (US$1.8 million) (FY2025–26 est.)
- Chancellor: Governor of West Bengal
- Vice-Chancellor: Rup Kumar Barman
- Faculty: 60
- Students: 1,180
- Postgraduates: 970
- Doctoral students: 210
- Location: Bankura, West Bengal, India; 23°16′39″N 87°05′06″E
- Campus: Rural
- Colors: 🟦 Sky blue
- Nickname: BKU
- Mascot: Bankura horse
- Website: www.bankurauniv.ac.in
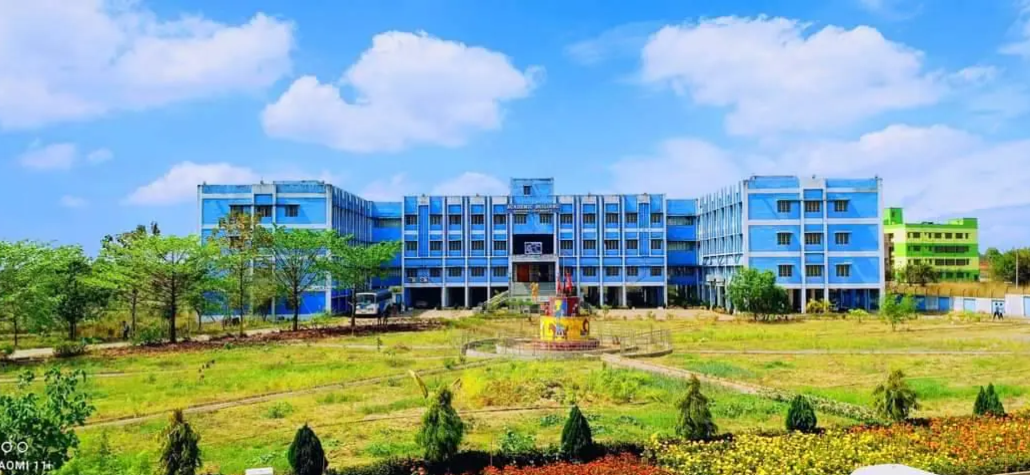

Bankura University is a public state university in Bankura, West Bengal, India. It was established by an Act of the West Bengal legislature. It currently offers courses at the undergraduate and postgraduate levels.

== History ==
Bankura University was established by the West Bengal Act XIX of 2013 and the assent of the Governor was first published in the Kolkata Gazette, Extraordinary, of 6 January 2014.

== Campus and location ==
The university has four academic campuses in the Bankura district — Purandarpur Campus, Puabagan Campus, Mithila Campus, and the Chhandar Campus.

== Organisation and administration ==
=== Governance ===
The Vice-chancellor of the Bankura University is the chief executive officer of the university. Deb Narayan Bandyopadhyay is the current Vice-chancellor of the university.

List of vice-chancellors
No.	Name
1.	Deb Narayan Bandyopadhyay
2.	Goutam Buddha Sural
3.	Rup Kumar Barman

=== Schools and departments ===
Bankura University has 13 departments organized into three schools.

- School of Science

Thus School consists of the departments of Mathematics, Physics, and Chemistry. Upcoming: Statistics, Geology, Electronic Science.

- School of Literature, Language, and Culture Studies

This school consists of the departments of Bengali, English, Sanskrit, and Santali.

- School of Social Sciences

This school consists of the departments of History, Political Science, Philosophy, Education, Social Work, and Law.

=== Affiliations ===
Bankura University is an affiliating university and has jurisdiction over the colleges of the Bankura district of West Bengal, India.

Govt./Govt.-Aided General Degree Colleges:

1. Bankura Christian College(101)
2. Bankura Sammilani College(102)
3. Bankura Zilla Saradamani Mahila Mahavidyapith (103)
4. Barjora College (104)
5. Birsha Munda Memorial College (105)
6. Chatra Ramai Pandit Mahavidyalaya (106)
7. Chhatna Chandidas Mahavidyalaya(107)
8. Gobinda Prasad Mahavidyalaya(108)
9. Indas Mahavidyalaya(109)
10. Jamini Roy College (110)
11. Khatra Adibasi Mahavidyalaya (111)
12. Onda Thana Mahavidyalaya(112)
13. Panchmura Mahavidyalaya (113)
14. Pandit Raghunath Murmu Smriti Mahavidyalaya (114)
15. Patrasayer Mahavidyalaya (115)
16. Raipur Block Mahavidyalaya (116)
17. Ramananda College (117)
18. Saldiha College (118)
19. Saltora Netaji Centenary College (119)
20. Sonamukhi College (120)
21. Swami Dhananjoy Das Kathiababa Mahavidyalaya (121)
22. Kabi Jagadram Roy Government General Degree College (122)
23. Government General Degree College, Ranibandh
24. Akui Kamalabala Women's College (124)
25. Institute of Computer and Information Science (125)
26. Sarsuna Law College

== Academics ==
=== Accreditation ===
Bankura University is recognized under Section 2(f) of UGC Act, 1956.

Bankura University (BKU) has been awarded with a CGPA of 2.4 (Grade B) by the National Assessment and Accreditation Council (NAAC).

== See also ==
- List of institutions of higher education in West Bengal
- Education in India
- Education in West Bengal
