= National Highway 60 (India, old numbering) =

Old numbering of road in India

National Highway 60

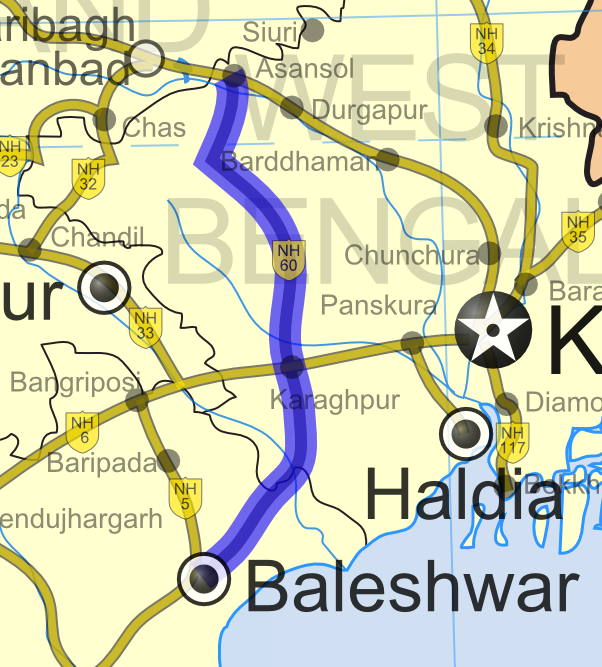
- Road map of India with National Highway 60 highlighted in blue

Route information
- Length: 446 km (277 mi) GQ: 119 km (74 mi) (Balasore - Kharagpur)

Major junctions
- From: Balasore, Odisha at junction of NH 5
- NH 6 at Kharagpur, NH 2 at Raniganj
- To: Morgram at junction of NH 34

Location
- Country: India
- States: Odisha, West Bengal
- Primary destinations: Jaleswar - Kharagpur - Medinipur - Bishnupur - Bankura - Raniganj - Suri - Rampurhat

Highway system
- Roads in India; Expressways; National; State; Asian
← NH 59A	→ NH 60A

National Highway 60 or NH 60 was a National Highway of India that ran from the junction with NH 5 at Balasore to the junction with NH 34 at Morgram. It passed through Jaleswar, Dantan, Belda, Narayangarh, Kharagpur, Medinipur, Salboni, Chandrakona Road Durllabhganj, Bishnupur, Bankura, Gangajalghati, Mejia and Raniganj, Pandaveshwar, Dubrajpur, Suri, Mohammad Bazar, Mallarpur, Rampurhat, Nalhati.

The Sheoraphuli–Kamarkundu–Tarakeswar–Arambagh Road meets NH 60 at Bishnupur. It meets and merges with the Bankura–Jhargram Road (State Highway 9) at Dhaldanga up to Bikna. The total length of NH 60 is 446 km (277 mi) out of which 57 km (35 mi) is in Odisha and 389 km (242 mi) in West Bengal. In 2010, the highway was renumbered to form parts of present-day NH 16, NH 49, and all of NH 14. The section between Balasore and Kharagpur became part of NH 16, after which a small portion of NH 49 is used to connect to the start of NH 14, upon which the rest of the route continues as until its terminus in Morgram.

== See also ==
- List of national highways in India
- National Highways Development Project
