= Bankura horse =

Terracotta horse produced in West Bengal

Bankura horse Bankura Panchmura Terracotta Craft
- Geographical indication
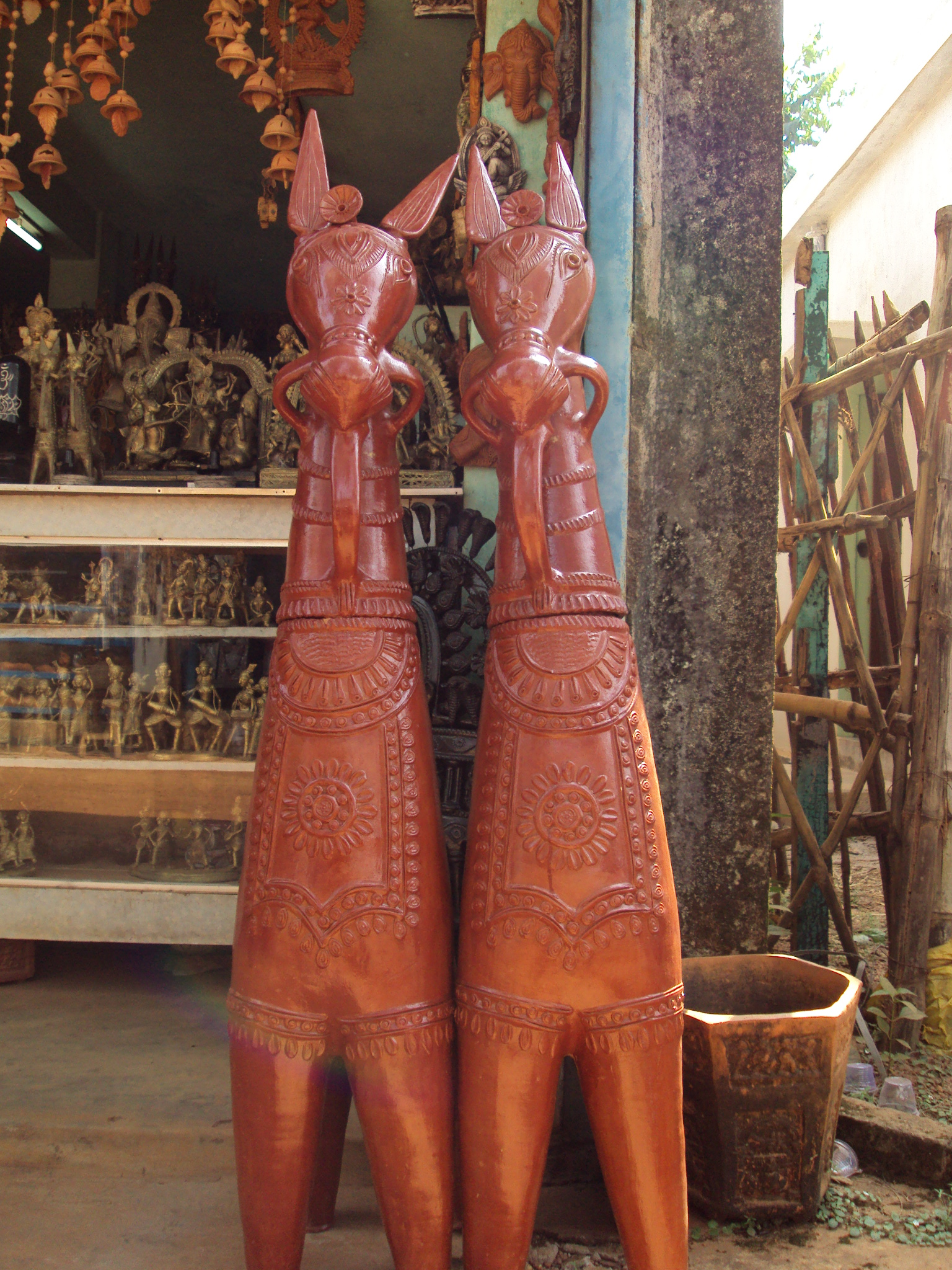
- Bankura horse
- Description: Bankura horse is a terracotta arts of West Bengal
- Type: arts of West Bengal
- Area: Panchmura, Bankura, West Bengal
- Country: India
- Registered: 28 March 2018; 8 years ago
- Material: Clay
- Official website: ipindiaservices.gov.in

Bankura horse is the terracotta horse, produced in Panchmura village in Bankura district in the Indian state of West Bengal. It has been praised for "its elegant stance and unique abstraction of basic values." Originally used for village rituals, it now adorns drawing rooms around the world as symbols of Indian folk-art. It is the logo of All India Handicrafts.

== Tradition ==
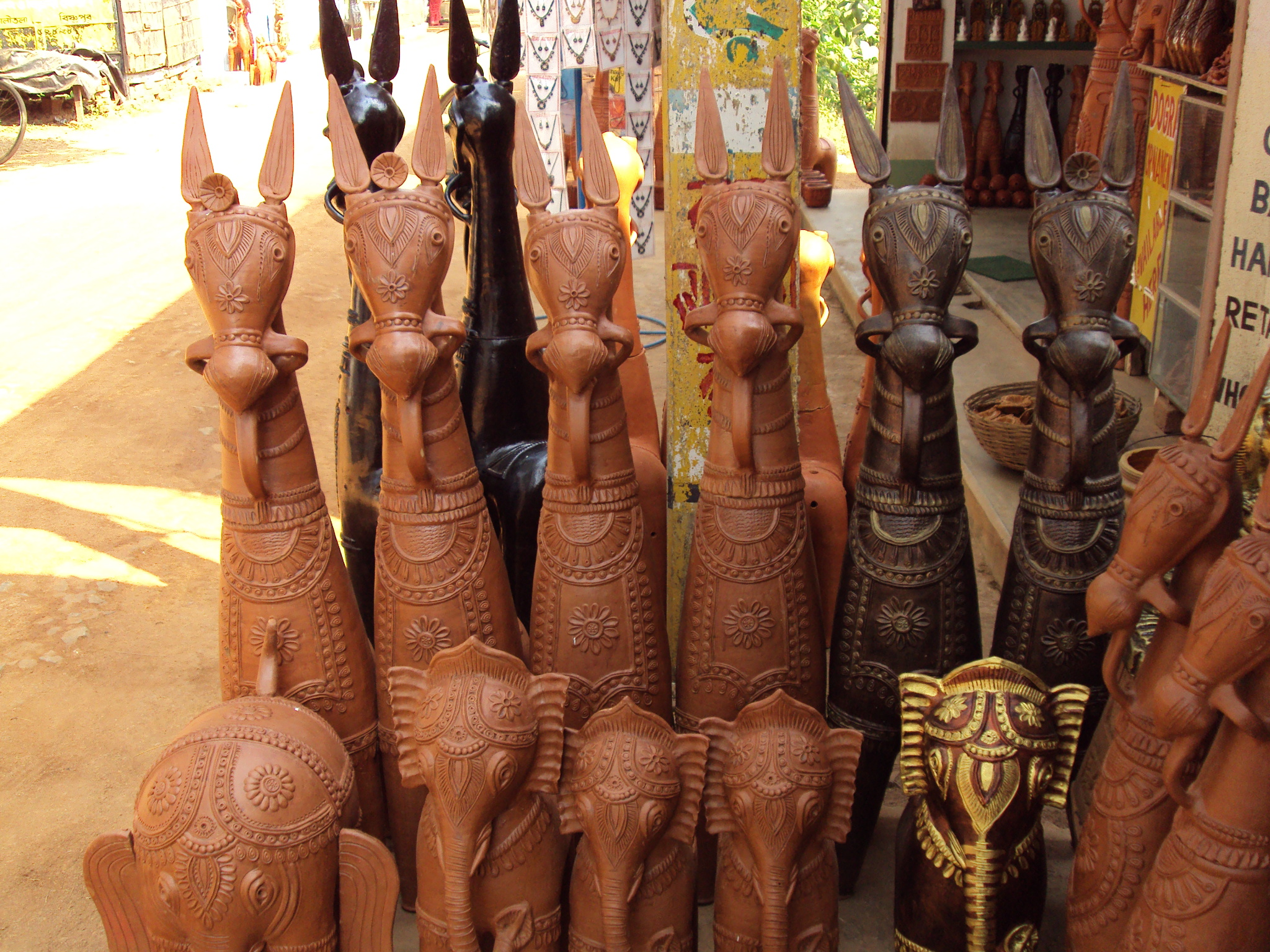
Terracotta horses and elephants in Bishnupur

In India, terracotta traditions are found from the earliest times. The outskirts of many an Indian village have a pipal tree with terracotta animal figures lying underneath it. They are symbols of fulfillment of aspirations of village folk. In order to cater to the commercial requirements of the modern global market, the village potter is often combining the traditional rural abstractions with refined urban tastes to show pieces of terracotta art.

The principal centres where the terracotta horses and elephants are produced are Panchmura, Rajagram, Sonamukhi and Hamirpur. Each place has its local style. The Panchmura-style of pottery is considered the best and the finest of all the four types.

== Process ==
Different parts of the hollow terracotta horses are turned out in separate parts, on the potter’s wheel. The four legs, the full neck in two parts and the face (seven pieces in all) are turned out separately on the wheel and then joined together. Additional clay is used for making up defects that may remain in the shape of the body. The leaf-like ears and the tails are done in moulds and are later inserted in grooves left on the body. The clay figures are then allowed to dry in the sun. After a little drying in the sun, holes are made on appropriate parts of the body in order that the inner and the outer surfaces of the body are equally dried. Cracks may develop in the body because of unequal drying of the inner and the outer portions. Drying is under done in the normal temperature of a closed room for about six or seven days. Then they are brought out of the room and heated in the sun. Finally they are fired.

The terracotta horses of Bankura are produced in two different colours. This achieved by modifying the kiln atmosphere: terracotta red colour is obtained by letting out the smoke through the vents of the kiln during firing to generate an oxidising atmosphere, and the black colour is obtained by sealing the vents to generate a reducing atmosphere.

== Significance ==
In the Rarh region where Dharmathakur is worshipped there is no end to the symbolic use of terracotta and wooden horses. Symbolic sacrifice of horses for fulfillment of wishes is common for many village gods and goddesses, but an assembly of terracotta horses of various shapes and sizes representing sacrifice on wish fulfillment is perhaps peculiar to Dharmathakur.

In 1957 the Bankura horse featured on an Indian postage stamp.

== Shape ==
Over the centuries the potters have moved away from a realistic presentation to an abstract representation. Potter-artists of different regions focused on different parts of the animal body in such a manner that representation of the same became more important than representation of the entire body of the animal.

== Geographical Indications ==
Bankura horse is registered under the Geographical Indications of West Bengal, named Bankura Panchmura Terracota Craft on 28 March 2018.

== See also ==
- Media related to Terracotta Horse of Panchmura at Wikimedia Commons
- Crafts of India
- Manasa chali, terracota idol of Hindu deity Manasa Debi
- Pottery in the Indian subcontinent

== Bankura horse gallery ==
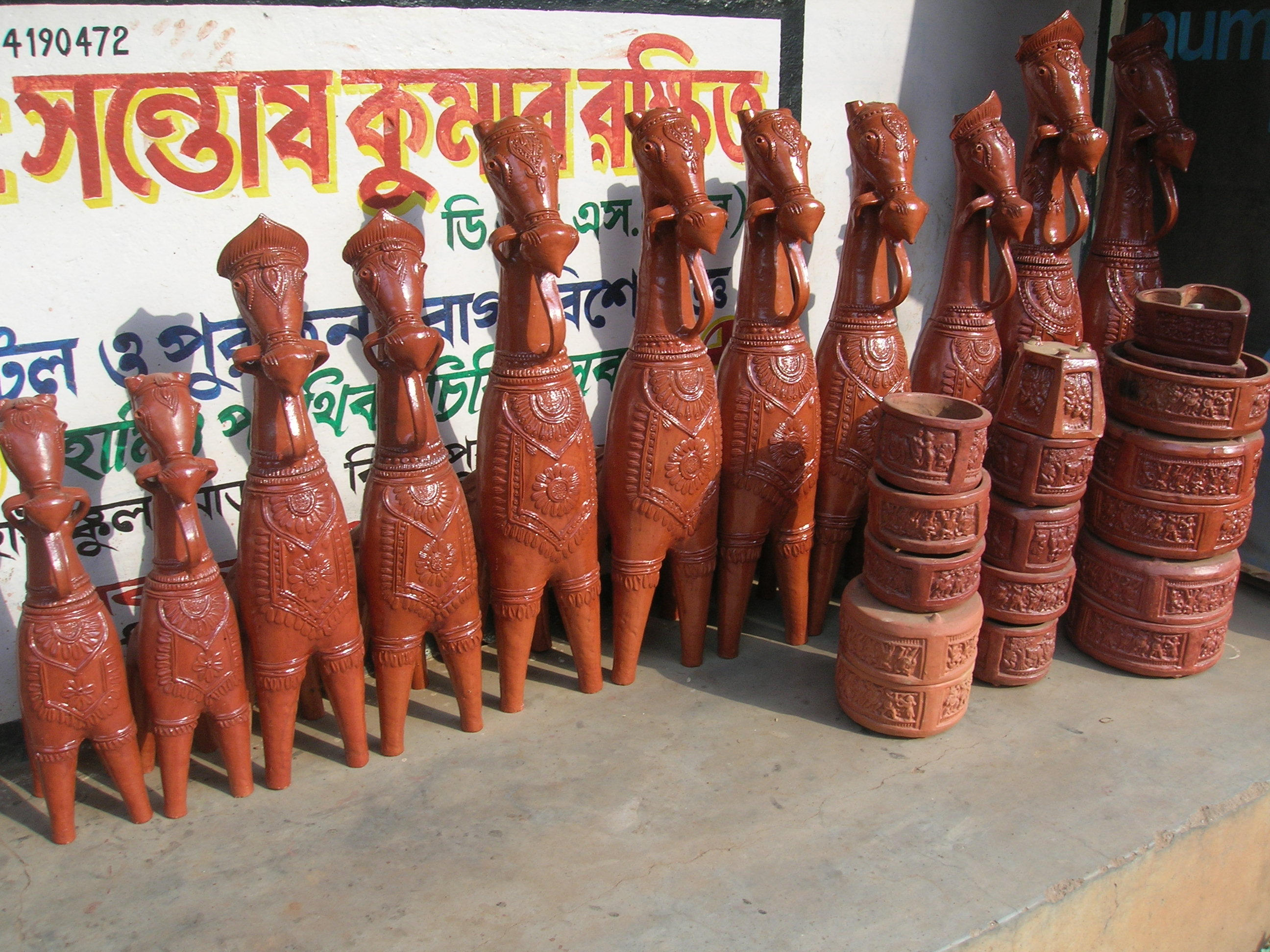
Bishnupur Terracotta Horse

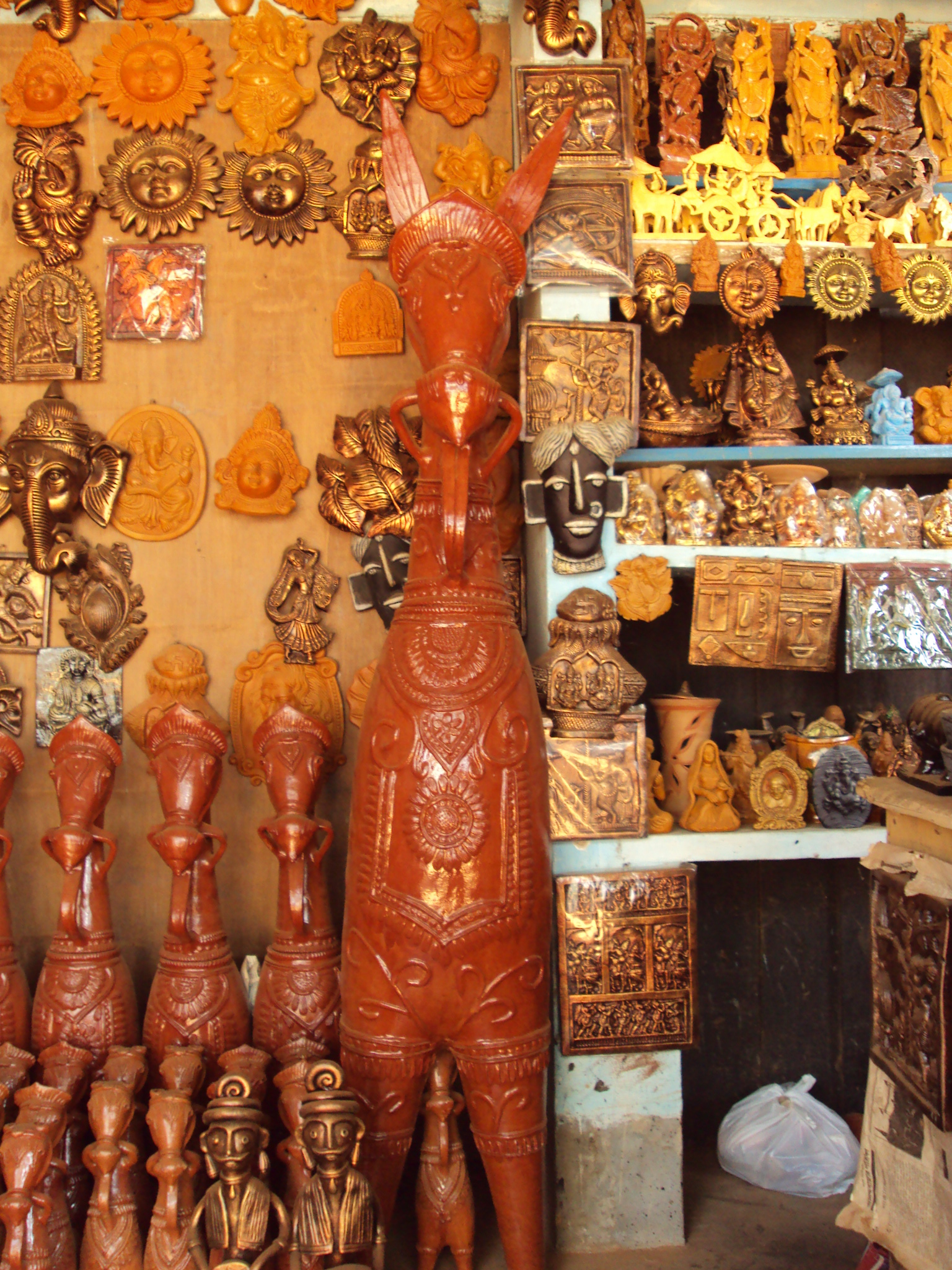
Bishnupur terracotta horse

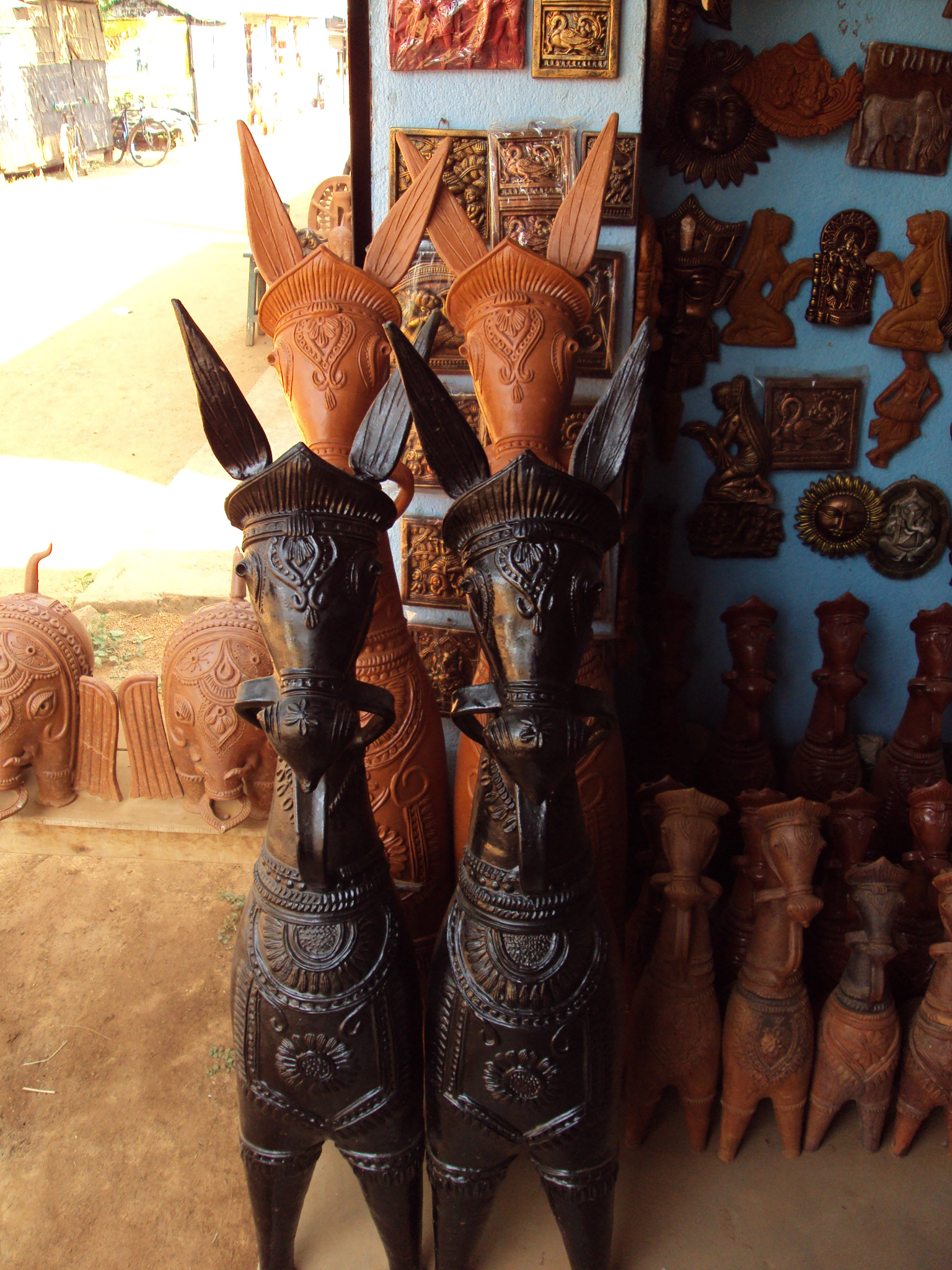
Bishnupur Terracotta Horse

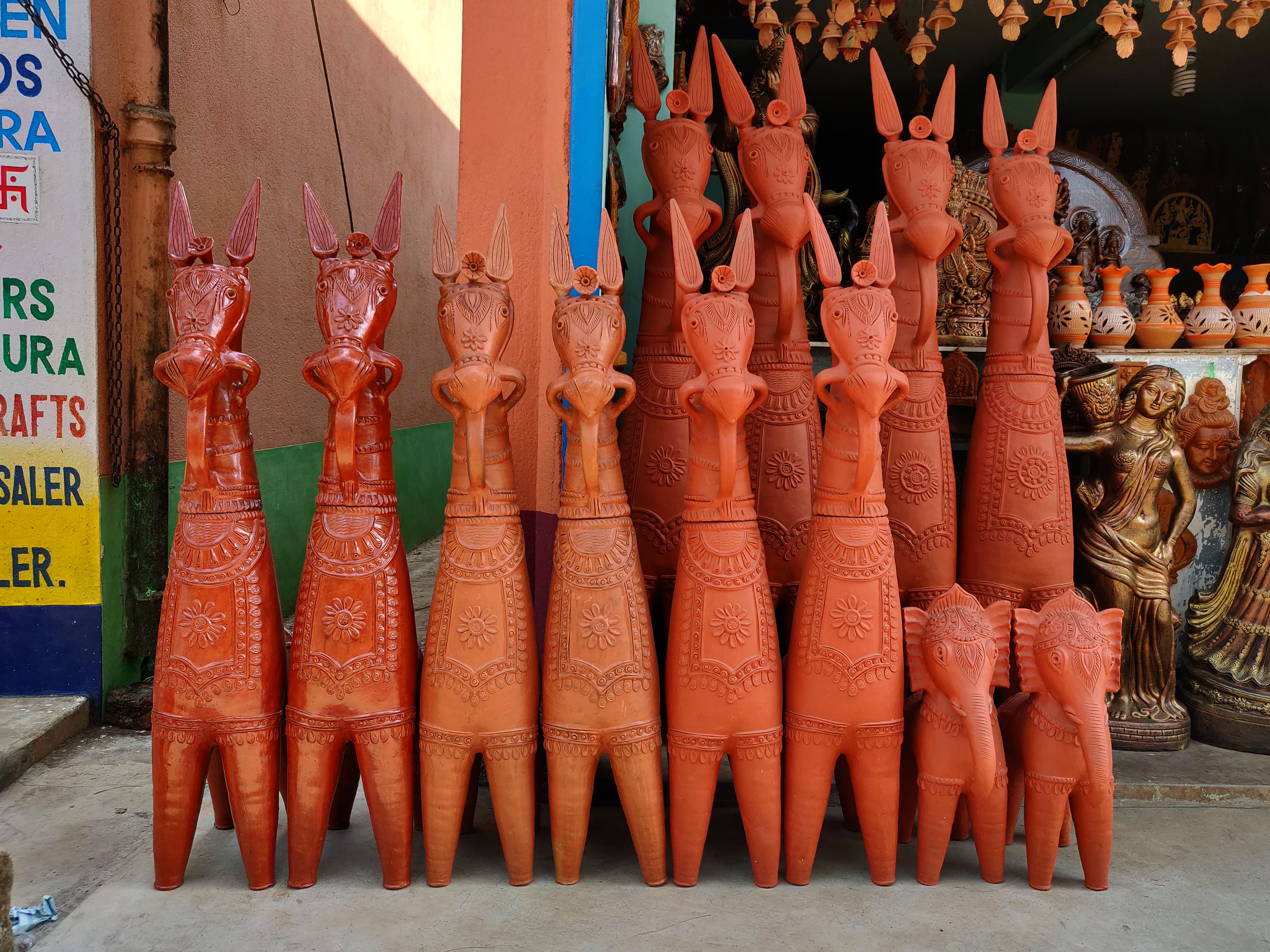
Bankura Terracotta Horses

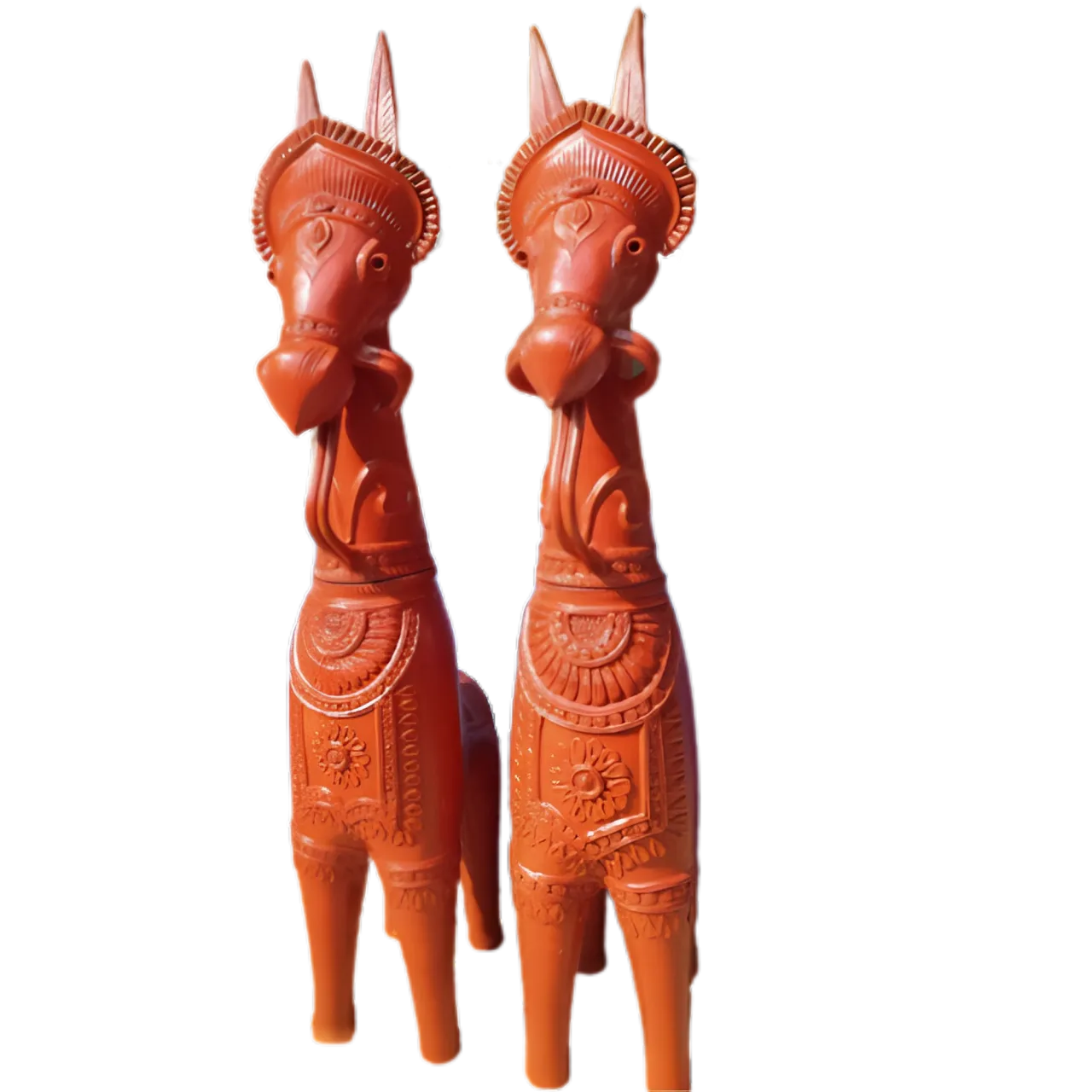
Bankura Terracotta Horses
