= National Highway 14 (India) =

National highway in India

National Highway 14
- Map of National Highway 14 in red
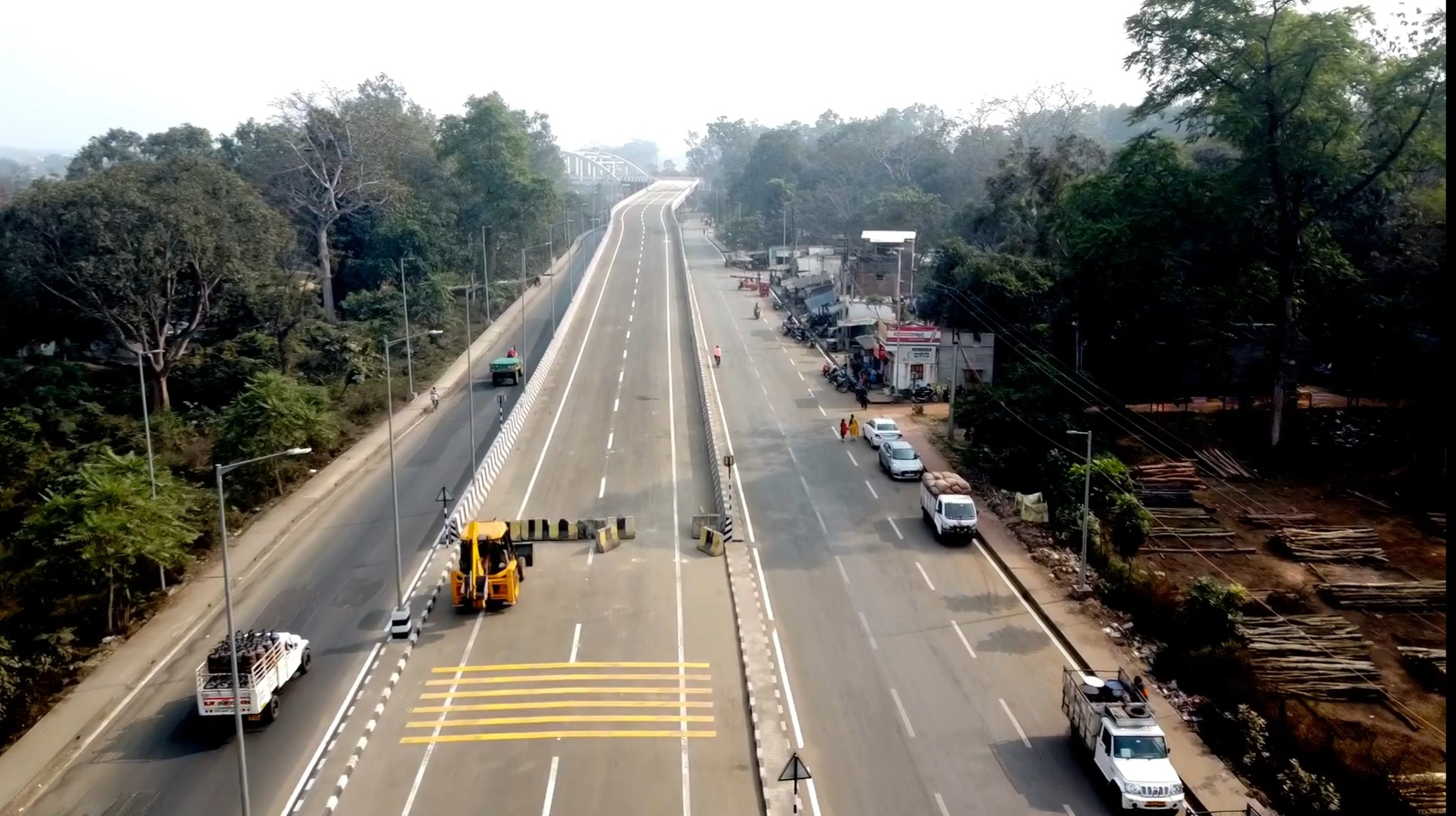

Route information
- Length: 306 km (190 mi)

Major junctions
- North end: Morgram
- SH 7 at Nalhati. SH 11 at Mahammad Bazar. SH 6 at Suri. SH 14 at Dubrajpur; NH 19 at Punjabi Morh, Raniganj. SH 8 from Gangajalghati to Bankura. SH 9 from Bikna to Gobindpur. SH 2 at Bankura and Bishnupur. SH 4 at Chandrakona Road. SH 7 at Midnapore.
- South end: Kharagpur

Location
- Country: India
- States: West Bengal

Highway system
- Roads in India; Expressways; National; State; Asian
← NH 12	→ NH 16

National Highway 14 (NH 14) is a National Highway in India. It runs from Morgram to Kharagpur in the Indian state of West Bengal.

== Route ==
NH 14 originates from its junction with NH 12 at Morgram in Murshidabad district and passes through Lohapur (a little off the highway), Nalhati, Rampurhat, Mallarpur, Deucha, Mohammad Bazar, Tilpara Barrage across Mayurakshi River, Suri, Bakreswar Thermal Power Plant Township (a little off the highway), Dubrajpur, Bhimgara (all in Birbhum district), Pandabeswar, Haripur, Sonpur Bazari, Raniganj (all in Paschim Bardhaman district), Mejia, Durlabhpur, Gangajalghati, Amarkanan, Bankura, Bheduasole, Onda, Bishnupur (all in Bankura district), Garbeta, Chandrakona Road, Salboni, Midnapore (all in Paschim Medinipur district) before terminating at its junction with NH 16 near Kharagpur. This Highway has 2 other sub routes running through Birbhum District. One sub route starts from Dubrajpur and runs up till Panagarh via Joydev Kenduli Morh, Ilambazar, Guskara Morh & Kanksa, meeting with NH 19 at Panagarh. Another subroute starts from Suri & running via Purandarpur, Panrui, Sriniketan-Suiri Morh, Kamarpara, joins the earlier sub route at Ilambazar.

== See also ==
- List of national highways in India
- National Highways Development Project
