= Morgram =

Moregram
- Village
- Location in West Bengal, India Moregram (India)
- Coordinates: 24.3°N 88.03°E
- Country: India
- State: West Bengal
- District: Murshidabad

Government
  - Type: Panchayati raj (India)
  - Body: Gram panchayat
- Elevation: 23 m (75 ft)

Languages
  - Official: Bengali, English
- Time zone: UTC+5:30 (IST)
- Postal code: 742226
- ISO 3166 code: IN-WB
- Vehicle registration: WB
- Lok Sabha constituency: Jangipur
- Vidhan Sabha constituency: Sagardighi
- Website: wb.gov.in

Morgram (also spelled Moregram) is a village and gram panchayat in the Sagardighi CD block in the Jangipur subdivision of Murshidabad district in the Indian state of West Bengal.

== Geography ==
Cities, towns and locations in the southern portion of Jangipur subdivision, Murshidabad district (including Suti I, Raghunathganj I, Raghunathganj II, Sagardighi CD blocks)
M: municipal town, CT: census town, R: rural/ urban centre, F: Facility
Abbreviation- TPS: Thermal Power Station, AMU: Aligarh Muslim University
Owing to space constraints in the small map, the actual locations in a larger map may vary slightly

=== Location ===
Morgram is located at 24.3°N 88.03°E.

Villages in Morgram gram panchayat are: Morgram, Dumaipur, Gangadda, Udaynagar, Sitalpara, Kharugram, Buzrak Fatepur, Pauli, Thakurpara, Ekrakhi, Bhola, Kaiar, Saorail, Gokulta, Chak Mathurpur, Surjyapur, Bhurkunda, and Nachna.

=== Area overview ===
Jangipur subdivision is crowded with 52 census towns and as such it had to be presented in two location maps. One of the maps can be seen alongside. The subdivision is located in the Rarh region that is spread over from adjoining Santhal Pargana division of Jharkhand. The land is slightly higher in altitude than the surrounding plains and is gently undulating. The river Ganges, along with its distributaries, is prominent in both the maps. At the head of the subdivision is the 2,245 m long Farakka Barrage, one of the largest projects of its kind in the country. Murshidabad district shares with Bangladesh a porous international border which is notoriously crime prone (partly shown in this map). The subdivision has two large power plants - the 2,100 MW Farakka Super Thermal Power Station and the 1,600 MW Sagardighi Thermal Power Station. According to a 2016 report, there are around 1,000,000 (1 million/ ten lakh) workers engaged in the beedi industry in Jangipur subdivision. 90% are home-based and 70% of the home-based workers are women. As of 2013, an estimated 2.4 million people reside along the banks of the Ganges alone in Murshidabad district. Severe erosion occurs along the banks.

Note: The two maps present some of the notable locations in the subdivision. All places marked in the maps are linked in the larger full screen maps.

== Demographics ==
Morgram had a population of 3,454 out of which 1,971 belonged to scheduled castes.

== Transport ==
Morgam is an important 3 way Intersection (road) or roadways junction of Murshidabad district. It is on National Highway 12 (old numbering NH 34). Morgram is one end terminus for National Highway 14, (old numbering NH 60), of which Panagarh–Morgram Highway is a part. The State Highway 7 (West Bengal) passes through Morgram. Morgram railway station is situated on Nalhati–Azimganj branch line of Howrah railway division.
