= Chhatna (community development block) =

- Community development block
- Coordinates: 23.3017435°N 86.9827080°E
- Country: India
- State: West Bengal
- District: Bankura

Government
  - Type: Representative democracy

Area
  - Total: 447.47 km^{2} (172.77 sq mi)
- Elevation: 139 m (456 ft)

Population (2011)
  - Total: 195,038
  - Density: 435.87/km^{2} (1,128.9/sq mi)

Languages
  - Official: Bengali, English
- Time zone: UTC+5:30 (IST)
- PIN: 722132 (Chhatna); 722137 (Jhantipahari); 722182 (Susunia)
- Telephone/STD code: 03241
- Vehicle registration: WB-67, WB-68
- Literacy: 65.73%
- Lok Sabha constituency: Bankura
- Vidhan Sabha constituency: Chhatna
- Website: bankura.gov.in

Chhatna is a community development block (CD block) that forms an administrative division in the Bankura Sadar subdivision of the Bankura district in the Indian state of West Bengal.

== History ==
=== From Bishnupur kingdom to the British Raj ===
From around the 7th century AD till around the advent of British rule, for around a millennium, history of Bankura district is identical with the rise and fall of the Hindu Rajas of Bishnupur. The Bishnupur Rajas, who were at the summit of their fortunes towards the end of the 17th century, started declining in the first half of the 18th century. First, the Maharaja of Burdwan seized the Fatehpur Mahal, and then the Maratha invasions laid waste their country.

Bishnupur was ceded to the British with the rest of Burdwan chakla in 1760. In 1787, Bishnupur was united with Birbhum to form a separate administrative unit. In 1793 it was transferred to the Burdwan collectorate. In 1879, the district acquired its present shape with the thanas of Khatra and Raipur and the outpost of Simplapal being transferred from Manbhum, and the thanas of Sonamukhi, Kotulpur and Indas being retransferred from Burdwan. However, it was known for sometime as West Burdwan and in 1881 came to be known as Bankura district.

== Geography ==
Map of Bankura District showing CD blocks and municipalities

Chhatna is located at 23°18′06″N 86°58′58″E. It is 13 km (8.1 mi) from Bankura town on the Bankura-Purulia road. Susunia is 10 km (6.2 mi) north-east of Chhatna.

Chhatna CD block is located in the western part of the district. It belongs to the Uneven lands/ hard ring rock area. The soil is laterite red and hard beds are covered with scrub jungle and sal wood.

There are two moderately high hills – Biharinath (in Saltora CD block) and Susunia (in Chhatna CD block). While the former rises to a height of 448 metres (1,470 ft), the latter attains a height of 440 metres (1,440 ft).

Chhatna CD block is bounded by Saltora and Gangajalghati CD blocks on the north, Bankura II and Bankura I CD blocks on the east, Indpur CD block on the south and Kashipur and Hura CD blocks, in Purulia district, on the west.

Chhatna CD block has an area of 447.47 km^{2}. It has 1 panchayat samity, 13 gram panchayats, 147 gram sansads (village councils), 288 mouzas, 277 inhabited villages and 1 census town. Chhatna police station serves this block. Headquarters of this CD block is at Chhatna.

Gram panchayats of Chhatna block/ panchayat samiti are: Arrah, Chhatna I, Chhatna II, Chinabari, Dhaban, Ghosegram, Jamtora, Jhunka, Jirrah, Metyala, Saldiha, Susunia and Teghari.

== Demographics ==
=== Population ===
According to the 2011 Census of India, Chhatna CD block had a total population of 195,038, of which 189,712 were rural and 5,326 were urban. There were 99,523 (51%) males and 95,515 (49%) females. Population in the age range of 0 to 6 years was 24,229. Scheduled Castes numbered 58,493 (29.99%) and Scheduled Tribes numbered 39,975 (20.50%).

In the 2001 census, Chhatna community development bloc had a total population of 169,141 of which 85,562 were males and 83,579 were females. Decadal growth for the period 1991-2001 was 8.32% for Chatna, against 13.79% in Bankura district. Decadal growth in West Bengal was 17.84%.

Census Towns in Chhatna CD block are (2011 census figures in brackets): Jhantipahari (5,236).

Villages in Chhatna CD block are (2011 census figures in brackets): Shaldiha (2,504), Teghori (1,663), Ghosergan (1,909), Metyala (501), Shushunia (1,018), Jhunka (1,721), Jirra (2085), Dhaban (1,543), Arra (2,127) and Chinabari (1,125).

=== Literacy ===
According to the 2011 census, the total number of literates in Chhatna CD block was 112,267 (65.73% of the population over 6 years) out of which males numbered 67,651 (77.63% of the male population over 6 years) and females numbered 44,616 (53.33%) of the female population over 6 years). The gender disparity (the difference between female and male literacy rates) was 24.30%.

As per the 2011 census, literacy in Bankura district was 70.26%, up from 63.44 in 2001 and 52.00% in 1991. Literacy in West Bengal was 77.08% in 2011. Literacy in India in 2011 was 74.04%.

See also – List of West Bengal districts ranked by literacy rate

Literacy in CD blocks of
Bankura district
Bankura Sadar subdivision
Saltora – 61.45%
Mejia – 66.83%
Gangajalghati – 68.11%
Chhatna – 65.73%
Bankura I – 68.74%
Bankura II – 73.59%
Barjora – 71.67%
Onda – 65.82%
Bishnupur subdivision
Indas – 71.70%
Joypur – 74.57%
Patrasayer – 64.8%
Kotulpur – 78.01%
Sonamukhi – 66.16%
Bishnupur – 66.30%
Khatra subdivision
Indpur – 67.42%
Ranibandh – 68.53%
Khatra – 72.18%
Hirbandh – 64.18%
Raipur – 71.33%
Sarenga – 74.25%
Simlapal – 68.44%
Taldangra – 70.87%
2011 Census: CD Block Wise

Primary Census Abstract Data

=== Language and religion ===
According to the District Census Handbook 2011, Bankura, as of 2001, Bengali was the mother-tongue of 89.9% of the population, followed by Santali (8.1%), Kurmali Thar (1.1%), Hindi (0.5%) and Telugu (0.1%).

There is a tribal presence in many of the CD blocks of the district. Santali is spoken by around 10% of the population. Some people also speak Mundari.

According to the West Bengal Official Language Act 1961 and the West Bengal Official Language (Amendment Act) 2012, the Bengali language is to be used for official purposes in the whole of West Bengal. In addition to Bengali, the Nepali language is to be used for official purposes in the three hills subdivisions, namely Darjeeling, Kalimpong and Kurseong, in the district of Darjeeling, and Urdu is to be used for official purposes in district/subdivision/ block/ municipality where the population speaking Urdu exceeds 10% of the total population. The English language will continue to be used for official purposes as it was being used prior to the enactment of these laws.

The West Bengal Official Language (Second Amendment) Bill, 2012, included Hindi, Santhali, Odiya and Punjabi as official languages if it is spoken by a population exceeding 10 per cent of the whole in a particular block or sub-division or a district. Subsequently, Kamtapuri, Rajbanshi and Kurmali were also included in the list of minority languages by the West Bengal Official Language (Second Amendment) Bill, 2018. However, as of 2020, there is no official / other reliable information about the areas covered.

Religion in Chhatna CD block (2011)
Hinduism	82.74%
Other (tribal religion)	14.51%
Islam	2.57%
Other or not stated	0.18%

In the 2011 census Hindus numbered 161,367 and formed 82.74% of the population in Chhatna CD block. Muslims numbered 5,006 and formed 2.57% of the population. Others numbered 28,665 and formed 14.70% of the population. Others include Addi Bassi, Marang Boro, Santal, Saranath, Sari Dharma, Sarna, Alchchi, Bidin, Sant, Sarvdharm, Seran, Saran, Sarin, Kheria, and other religious communities. In 2001, Hindus were 80.52% while Muslims were 2.45% and followers of tribal religion were 16.89% of the population.

Languages of Chhatna CD block (2011)
1. Bengali (80.6%)
2. Santali (18.9%)
3. Others (0.43%)

At the time of the 2011 census, 80.64% of the population spoke Bengali and 18.93% Santali as their first language.

== Rural poverty ==
In Chhatna CD block 49.95% families were living below poverty line in 2007. According to the Rural Household Survey in 2005, 28.87% of the total number of families were BPL families in the Bankura district.

Migration has been observed in the following CD blocks of Bankura district: Bankura I, Chhatna, Saltora, Indpur, Ranibandh, Hirbandh, Khatra, Raipur and Sarenga. Although authentic figures are not available, a sample survey has been done. According to the sample survey, around 54.5% to 85.4% of the families on an average migrate from these blocks. Another study shows that around 23% of the people from the under-privileged blocks in the western and southern Bankura migrate. Those migrating belong mostly to the SC or ST population. They migrate for periods varying from 15 days to 6/8 months. Most people migrate to meet their food deficit and go to Bardhaman and Hooghly districts but some go to Gujarat and Maharashtra as construction labour.

== Economy ==
=== Livelihood ===
Livelihood
in Chhatna CD block
1. Cultivators (19.1%)
2. Agricultural labourers (42.1%)
3. Household industries (3.67%)
4. Other Workers (35.1%)

In the Chhatna CD block in 2011, among the class of total workers, cultivators numbered 14,774 and formed 19.13%, agricultural labourers numbered 32,500 and formed 42.09%, household industry workers numbered 2,835 and formed 3.67% and other workers numbered 27,103 and formed 35.10%. Total workers numbered 77,212 and formed 39.59% of the total population, and non-workers numbered 117,826 and formed 60.41% of the population.

Note: In the census records a person is considered a cultivator, if the person is engaged in cultivation/ supervision of land owned by self/government/institution. When a person who works on another person's land for wages in cash or kind or share, is regarded as an agricultural labourer. Household industry is defined as an industry conducted by one or more members of the family within the household or village, and one that does not qualify for registration as a factory under the Factories Act. Other workers are persons engaged in some economic activity other than cultivators, agricultural labourers and household workers. It includes factory, mining, plantation, transport and office workers, those engaged in business and commerce, teachers, entertainment artistes and so on.

=== Infrastructure ===
There are 277 inhabited villages in the Chhatna CD block, as per the District Census Handbook, Bankura, 2011. 100% villages have power supply. 276 villages (99.64%) have drinking water supply. 27 villages (9.75%) have post offices. 230 villages (83.03%) have telephones (including landlines, public call offices and mobile phones). 93 villages (33.57%) have pucca (paved) approach roads and 70 villages (25.27%) have transport communication (includes bus service, rail facility and navigable waterways). 12 villages (4.33%) have agricultural credit societies and 11 villages (3.97%) have banks.

=== Agriculture ===
There were 77 fertiliser depots, 15 seed stores and 80 fair price shops in the CD block.

In 2013–14, persons engaged in agriculture in Chhatna CD block could be classified as follows: bargadars 10.22%, patta (document) holders 11.36%, small farmers (possessing land between 1 and 2 hectares) 6.64%, marginal farmers (possessing land up to 1 hectare) 20.56% and agricultural labourers 51.20%.

In 2003-04 net area sown in Chhatna CD block was 24,932 hectares and the area in which more than one crop was grown was 2,571 hectares.

In 2013–14, the total area irrigated in Chhatna CD block was 2,625 hectares, out of which 1,695 hectares by tank water, 860 hectares by river lift irrigation, 45 hectares by shallow tubewells and 25 hectares by open dug wells.

In 2013–14, Chhatna CD block produced 6,976 tonnes of Aman paddy, the main winter crop, from 2,756 hectares. It also produced mustard.

=== Handloom and pottery industries ===
The handloom industry engages the largest number of persons in the non farm sector and hence is important in Bankura district. The handloom industry is well established in all the CD blocks of the district and includes the famous Baluchari saris. In 2004-05 Chhatna CD Block had 1,112 looms in operation.

Bankura district is famous for the artistic excellence of its pottery products that include the famous Bankura horse. The range of pottery products is categorised as follows: domestic utilities, terracota and other decorative items and roofing tiles and other heavy pottery items. Around 3,200 families were involved in pottery making in the district in 2002. 212 families were involved in Chhatna CD block.

=== Banking ===
In 2013–14, Chhatna CD block had offices of 9 commercial banks and 4 gramin banks.

=== Backward Regions Grant Fund ===
The Bankura district is listed as a backward region and receives financial support from the Backward Regions Grant Fund. The fund, created by the Government of India, is designed to redress regional imbalances in development. As of 2012, 272 districts across the country were listed under this scheme. The list includes 11 districts of West Bengal.

== Transport ==
In 2013–14, Chhatna CD block had 9 originating/ terminating bus routes.

The Kharagpur-Bankura-Adra line of South Eastern Railway passes through this CD block. Chhatna railway station and Jhantipahari railway station are on this line.

The Saltora-Bankura section of State Highway 8 running from Santaldih (in Purulia district) to Majhdia (in Nadia district) passes through this CD block.

== Education ==
In 2013–14, Chhatna CD block had 244 primary schools with 16,444 students, 20 middle schools with 2,105 students, 12 high schools with 7,881 students and 8 higher secondary schools with 6,840 students. Chhatna CD block had 1 general college with 696 students, 1 professional/ technical institution with 207 students and 386 institutions for special and non-formal education with 10,441 students. Chhatna CD Block had 13 mass literacy centres.

See also – Education in India

According to the 2011 census, in the Chhatna CD block, among the 277 inhabited villages, 44 villages did not have a school, 55 villages had two or more primary schools, 45 villages had at least 1 primary and 1 middle school and 26 villages had at least 1 middle and 1 secondary school.

Saldiha College at Saldiha was established in 1966. It has hostel facilities – three for boys and one for girls.

Chhatna Chandidas Mahavidyalaya was established at Ghoramuli in 2007.

The College of Agriculture, Chhatna, an extended campus of Bidhan Chandra Krishi Vishwavidyalaya was started in 2015.

== Healthcare ==
In 2014, Chhatna CD block had 1 rural hospital, 4 primary health centres and 1 private nursing home with total 59 beds and 7 doctors. It had 36 family welfare sub centres and 1 family welfare centre. 5,199 patients were treated indoor and 211,882 patients were treated outdoor in the hospitals, health centres and subcentres of the CD Block.

Chhatna Rural Hospital, with 30 beds at Chhatna, is the major government medical facility in the Chhatna CD block. There are primary health centres at Jorhia (with 10 beds), Salchura (Kamalpur) (with 2 beds), Jhantipahari (with 6 beds) and Bhagabanpur (with 6 beds).

There is also a super speciality hospital in Sarberia with modern medical facilities.
