= 1977 Indian general election in West Bengal =

All 42 West Bengal seats in the Lok Sabha
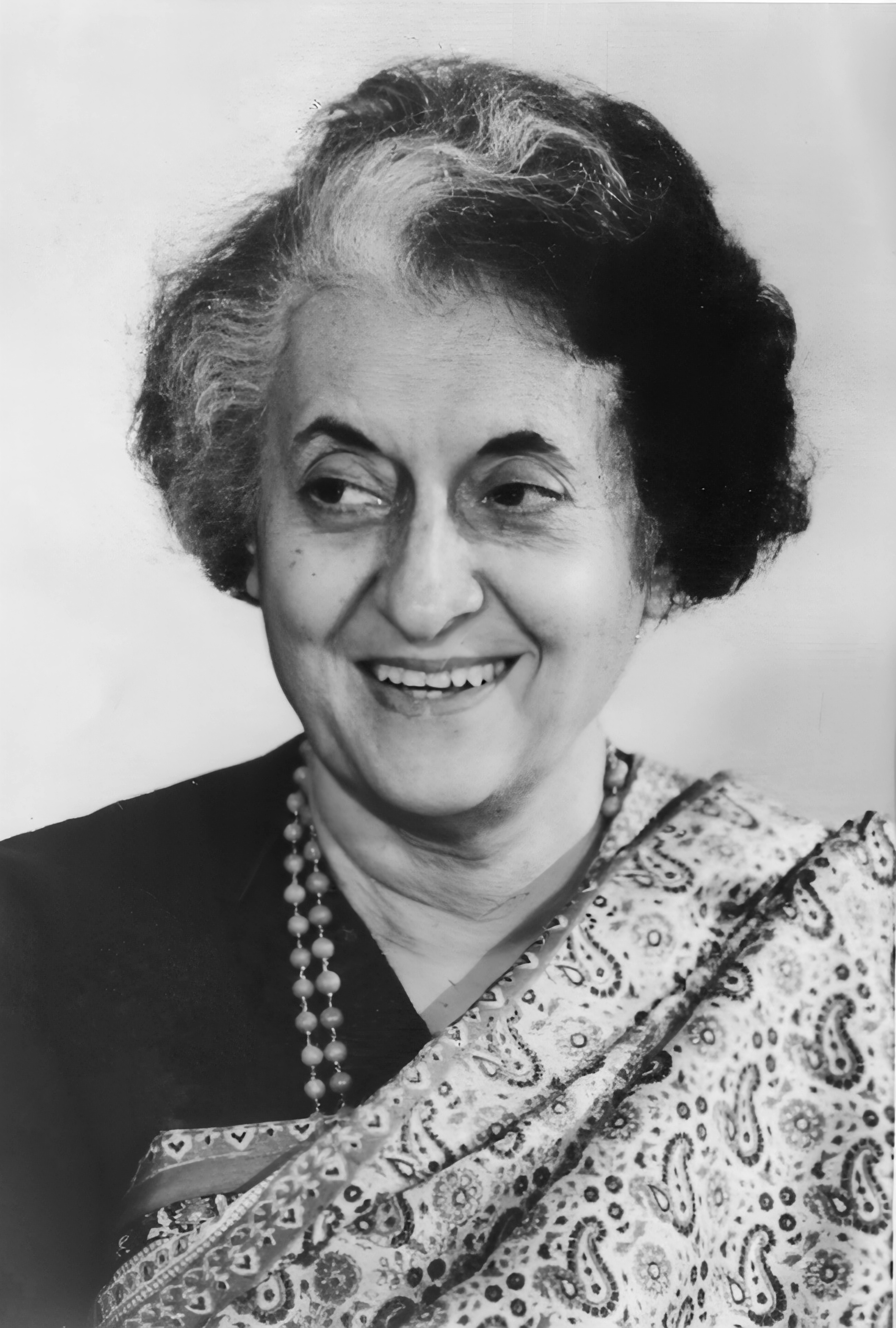
	First party	Second party	Third party
Party	CPI(M)	INC	JP
Last election	34.29%, 20 seats	28.20%, 13 seats	New
Seats won	17	3	15
Seat change	▼3	▼10	▲15
Popular vote	3,839,091	4,312,418	3,151,318
Percentage	26.15%	29.37%	21.46%
Alliance seats	39	3	39
Prime Minister before election
Indira Gandhi
INC
Elected Prime Minister
Morarji Desai
JP

The 1977 Indian general election was held in West Bengal to elect 42 members of the 6th Lok Sabha.

This election took place after the Emergency imposed by Indira Gandhi. In the aftermath, the newly formed Janata Party formed an alliance with the CPI(M)-led front, while the CPI aligned with the Indian National Congress (INC).

== Parties and alliances ==
=== Janata Party + Left Front ===
Janata Alliance

Party	Flag	Symbol	Leader	Seats contested
Communist Party of India (Marxist)				20
Janata Party			Morarji Desai	15
Revolutionary Socialist Party				3
All India Forward Bloc				3
Independent				1
Total				42

=== Indian National Congress + Communist Party of India ===
INC + CPI

Party	Flag	Symbol	Leader	Seats contested
Indian National Congress				34
Communist Party of India				8
Total				42

=== Others ===
Party	Seats contested
Socialist Unity Centre of India	2
All India Gorkha League	1
Republican Party of India	1
Independent	78

== List of Candidates ==
=== List of Candidates from Prominent Parties ===
Constituency		Janata + Left Alliance		INC + CPI	
#	Name	Party	Candidate	Party	Candidate
1	Cooch Behar (SC)	AIFB	Amar Roy Pradhan	INC	Benoy Krishna Daschowdhury
2	Alipurduars (ST)	RSP	Pius Tirkey	INC	Tuna Oraon
3	Jalpaiguri	IND	Khagendra Nath Dasgupta	INC	Maya Ray
4	Darjeeling	CPM	Ratanlal Brahmin	INC	Krishna Bahadur Chhetri
5	Raiganj	JP	Md. Hayat Ali	INC	Abedin Anowarul
6	Balurghat (SC)	RSP	Palas Barman	INC	Rasendra Nath Barman
7	Malda	CPM	Dinesh Chandra Joarder	INC	Pranab Mukherjee
8	Jangipur	CPM	Sasankasekher Sanyal	INC	Lutfal Haque
9	Murshidabad	JP	Syed Kazim Ali Mirza	INC	Azizur Rahman
10	Berhampore	RSP	Tridib Chaudhuri	INC	Sudip Bandyopadhyay
11	Krishnagar	CPM	Renu Pada Das	INC	Shibsankar Bandyopadhayay
12	Nabadwip (SC)	CPM	Bibha Ghosh Goswami	CPI	Nitaipada Sarkar
13	Barasat	AIFB	Chitta Basu	CPI	Ranen Sen
14	Basirhat	JP	Alhaj M. A. Hannan	INC	A. K. M. Ishaque
15	Joynagar (SC)	JP	Sakti Kumar Sarkar	INC	Nirmal Kanti Mondal
16	Mathurapur (SC)	CPM	Mukunda Kumar Mondal	INC	Purnendu Sekhar Naskar
17	Diamond Harbour	CPM	Jyotirmoy Basu	INC	Biren Mahanti
18	Jadavpur	CPM	Somnath Chatterjee	CPI	Mohammad Elias
19	Barrackpore	CPM	Mahammad Ismail	INC	Saugata Roy
20	Dum Dum	JP	Ashok Krishna Dutt	CPI	Indrajit Gupta
21	Calcutta North West	JP	Bijoy Singh Nahar	INC	Ashoke Kumar Sen
22	Calcutta North East	JP	Pratap Chandra Chunder	CPI	Hirendranath Mukherjee
23	Calcutta South	JP	Dilip Chakravarty	INC	Priya Ranjan Dasmunsi
24	Howrah	CPM	Samar Mukherjee	INC	Nityananda Dey
25	Uluberia	CPM	Shyamaprasanna Bhattacharyya	INC	Nirmalendu Bhattacharya
26	Serampore	CPM	Dinendra Nath Bhattacharya	CPI	Jadu Gopal Sen
27	Hooghly	CPM	Bijoy Krishna Modak	INC	Bishnu Charan Banerjee
28	Arambagh	JP	Prafulla Chandra Sen	INC	Santi Mohan Roy
29	Panskura	JP	Abha Maiti	INC	Phulrenu Guha
30	Tamluk	JP	Sushil Kumar Dhara	INC	Satis Chandra Samanta
31	Contai	JP	Samar Guha	INC	Sudhangshu Panda
32	Midnapore	JP	Sudhir Kumar Ghosal	CPI	Narayan Choubey
33	Jhargram (ST)	CPM	Jadunath Kisku	INC	Amiya Kumar Kisku
34	Purulia	AIFB	Chittaranjan Mahata	INC	Pashupati Mahato
35	Bankura	JP	Bijoy Mondal	INC	Shankar Narayan Singh Deo
36	Vishnupur (SC)	CPM	Ajit Kumar Saha	INC	Gour Chandra Lohar
37	Durgapur (SC)	CPM	Krishna Chandra Halder	INC	Manoranjan Pramanik
38	Asansol	CPM	Robin Sen	INC	Syed Mohammad Jalal
39	Burdwan	JP	Raj Krishna Dawn	INC	Shyama Prasad Kundu
40	Katwa	CPM	Syed Abul Mansur Habibullah	INC	Dhirendranath Basu
41	Bolpur	CPM	Saradish Roy	CPI	Durga Banerjee
42	Birbhum (SC)	CPM	Gadadhar Saha	INC	Birendaban Saha

== Election Statistics ==
#	Const. Name	Electors	Poll Date	Votes	Voters	Poll %
1	Cooch Behar (SC)	570,556	16 March 1977	350,184	363,908	63.78%
2	Alipurduars (ST)	523,297	16 March 1977	295,162	312,975	59.81%
3	Jalpaiguri	529,606	16 March 1977	302,981	315,866	59.64%
4	Darjeeling	624,898	16 March 1977	261,953	272,135	43.55%
5	Raiganj	563,672	16 March 1977	336,476	347,199	61.60%
6	Balurghat (SC)	557,919	16 March 1977	357,661	369,396	66.21%
7	Malda	550,001	16 March 1977	358,965	368,914	67.08%
8	Jangipur	565,255	16 March 1977	317,291	328,222	58.07%
9	Murshidabad	587,057	16 March 1977	351,915	363,744	61.96%
10	Berhampore	645,013	16 March 1977	380,587	391,275	60.66%
11	Krishnagar	534,845	16 March 1977	321,433	331,367	61.96%
12	Nabadwip (SC)	635,456	16 March 1977	360,854	371,933	58.53%
13	Barasat	609,986	16 March 1977	362,741	372,416	61.05%
14	Basirhat	583,782	16 March 1977	342,228	351,244	60.17%
15	Joynagar (SC)	626,050	16 March 1977	369,183	380,213	60.73%
16	Mathurapur (SC)	601,885	16 March 1977	387,518	397,485	66.04%
17	Diamond Harbour	608,458	16 March 1977	379,376	389,100	63.95%
18	Jadavpur	624,264	16 March 1977	347,144	356,636	57.13%
19	Barrackpore	650,725	16 March 1977	457,519	470,018	72.23%
20	Dum Dum	698,781	16 March 1977	422,006	431,362	61.73%
21	Calcutta North West	595,840	16 March 1977	313,880	321,742	54.00%
22	Calcutta North East	641,747	16 March 1977	352,141	361,255	56.29%
23	Calcutta South	654,202	16 March 1977	388,354	398,561	60.92%
24	Howrah	669,642	16 March 1977	377,239	389,263	58.13%
25	Uluberia	610,328	16 March 1977	395,826	404,839	66.33%
26	Serampore	628,219	16 March 1977	380,327	392,237	62.44%
27	Hooghly	560,707	16 March 1977	357,512	367,205	65.49%
28	Arambagh	580,700	16 March 1977	389,305	398,708	68.66%
29	Panskura	519,863	16 March 1977	363,271	373,170	71.78%
30	Tamluk	603,246	16 March 1977	412,155	421,330	69.84%
31	Contai	581,866	16 March 1977	380,162	388,122	66.70%
32	Midnapore	578,798	16 March 1977	325,998	338,254	58.44%
33	Jhargram (ST)	575,907	16 March 1977	344,059	358,585	62.26%
34	Purulia	582,892	16 March 1977	294,143	303,660	52.10%
35	Bankura	603,383	16 March 1977	307,940	320,481	53.11%
36	Vishnupur (SC)	601,160	16 March 1977	363,103	376,332	62.60%
37	Durgapur (SC)	677,500	16 March 1977	346,235	359,280	53.03%
38	Asansol	647,254	16 March 1977	276,773	287,229	44.38%
39	Burdwan	638,853	16 March 1977	354,473	363,202	56.85%
40	Katwa	575,293	16 March 1977	360,300	369,898	64.30%
41	Bolpur	550,289	16 March 1977	256,932	266,128	48.36%
42	Birbhum (SC)	553,221	16 March 1977	278,604	288,116	52.08%

== Results by Party ==
=== Results by Party/Alliance ===
Alliance/ Party		Popular vote			Seats		
Alliance/ Party		Votes	%	±pp	Contested	Won	+/−
JP+	CPI(M)	38,39,091	26.15	▼8.14	20	17	▼3
JP+	JP	31,51,318	21.46	New entry	15	15	New entry
JP+	AIFB	6,31,200	4.30	▲1.60	3	3	▲3
JP+	RSP	5,78,786	3.94	▲1.90	3	3	▲2
JP+	IND	1,73,484	1.18	Steady	1	1	▲1
JP+	Total	83,73,879	57.03	Steady	42	39	Steady
INC	INC	43,12,418	29.37	▲1.17	34	3	▼10
INC	CPI	9,52,997	6.49	▼4.05	8	0	▼3
INC	Total	52,65,415	35.86	Steady	42	3	Steady
Others		2,22,649	1.52	Steady	9	0	Steady
IND		8,19,966	5.58	Steady	78	0	Steady
Total		1,46,81,909	100%	-	171	42	-

== Detailed Results ==
Constituency		Winner				Runner-up				Margin	
Constituency		Candidate	Party	Votes	%	Candidate	Party	Votes	%	Votes	%
1	Cooch Behar (SC)	Amrendranath Roy Pradhan	AIFB	2,26,521	64.69	Benoy Krishna Daschowdhury	INC	1,23,663	35.31	1,02,858	29.38
2	Alipurduars (ST)	Pius Tirkey	RSP	1,67,865	56.87	Tuna Oraon	INC	1,27,297	43.13	40,568	13.74
3	Jalpaiguri	Khagendra Nath Dasgupta	IND	1,73,484	57.26	Maya Ray	INC	1,15,786	38.22	57,698	19.04
4	Darjeeling	Krishna Bahadur Chettri	INC	1,09,520	41.81	Ratanlal Brahman	CPM	91,040	34.75	18,480	7.06
5	Raiganj	Md. Hayat Ali	JP	1,88,694	56.08	Abedin Anowarul	INC	1,21,570	36.13	67,124	19.95
6	Balurghat (SC)	Palas Barman	RSP	2,06,112	57.63	Rasendra Nath Burman	INC	1,51,549	42.37	54,563	15.26
7	Malda	Dinesh Chandra Joardar	CPM	1,88,103	52.40	Pranab Kumar Mukherjee	INC	1,58,395	44.13	29,708	8.27
8	Jangipur	Sasankasekher Sanyal	CPM	1,55,008	48.85	Lutfal Haque (Haji)	INC	1,52,822	48.16	2,186	0.69
9	Murshidabad	Syed Kazim Ali Meerza	JP	1,40,927	40.05	Azizur Rahman	INC	1,04,838	29.79	36,089	10.26
10	Berhampore	Tridib Chaudhuri	RSP	2,04,809	53.81	Sudip Bandyopadhyay	INC	1,02,629	26.97	1,02,180	26.84
11	Krishnagar	Renupada Das	CPM	1,98,830	61.86	Shibsankar Bandyopadhayay	INC	1,07,462	33.43	91,368	28.43
12	Nabadwip (SC)	Bibha Ghosh (Goswami)	CPM	1,93,714	53.68	Nitaipada Sarkar	CPI	1,06,428	29.49	87,286	24.19
13	Barasat	Chitta Basu	AIFB	2,03,694	56.15	Ranen Sen	CPI	87,900	24.23	1,15,794	31.92
14	Basirhat	Alhaj M.A. Hannan	JP	1,68,644	49.28	A.K.M. Ishaque	INC	1,56,458	45.72	12,186	3.56
15	Joynagar (SC)	Sakti Kumar Sarkar	JP	1,80,587	48.92	Nirmal Kanti Mondal	INC	1,19,950	32.49	60,637	16.43
16	Mathurapur (SC)	Mukunda Kumar Mondal	CPM	1,88,227	48.57	Purnendu Sekhar Naskar	INC	1,46,635	37.84	41,592	10.73
17	Diamond Harbour	Jyotirmoy Basu	CPM	2,67,890	70.61	Biren Mahanti	INC	1,11,486	29.39	1,56,404	41.22
18	Jadavpur	Somnath Chatterjee	CPM	2,36,085	68.01	Mohammad Elias	CPI	97,450	28.07	1,38,635	39.94
19	Barrackpore	Sougata Roy	INC	2,95,551	64.60	Mahammad Ismail	CPM	1,54,537	33.78	1,41,014	30.82
20	Dum Dum	Asoke Krishna Dutt	JP	2,15,766	51.13	Indrajit Gupta	CPI	1,93,986	45.97	21,780	5.16
21	Calcutta North West	Bijoy Singh Nahar	JP	1,79,681	57.25	Ashoke Kumar Sen	INC	1,10,048	35.06	69,633	22.19
22	Calcutta North East	Pratap Chandra Chunder	JP	2,37,787	67.53	Hirendra Nath Mukherjee	CPI	1,08,028	30.68	1,29,759	36.85
23	Calcutta South	Dilip Chakravarty	JP	2,25,556	58.08	Priya Ranjan Das Munshi	INC	1,57,616	40.59	67,940	17.49
24	Howrah	Samar Mukherjee	CPM	2,36,530	62.70	Nityananda Dey	INC	1,31,799	34.94	1,04,731	27.76
25	Uluberia	Shyamaprasanna Bhattacharyya	CPM	2,25,583	56.99	Nirmalendu Bhattacharjee	INC	1,11,084	28.06	1,14,499	28.93
26	Serampore	Dinen Bhattacharya	CPM	2,60,071	68.38	Jadu Gopal Sen	CPI	1,20,256	31.62	1,39,815	36.76
27	Hooghly	Bijoy Krishna Modak	CPM	2,23,818	62.60	Bishnu Charan Banerjee	INC	1,17,559	32.88	1,06,259	29.72
28	Arambagh	Prafulla Chandra Sen	JP	2,98,371	76.64	Santi Mohan Roy	INC	90,934	23.36	2,07,437	53.28
29	Panskura	Abha Maiti	JP	2,30,704	63.51	Phulrenu Guha	INC	1,32,567	36.49	98,137	27.02
30	Tamluk	Sushil Kumar Dhara	JP	2,54,049	61.64	Satis Chandra Samanta	INC	1,35,474	32.87	1,18,575	28.77
31	Contai	Guha Samar	JP	2,84,509	74.84	Sudhangshu Panda	INC	89,995	23.67	1,94,514	51.17
32	Midnapore	Ghosal Sudhir Kumar	JP	1,80,061	55.23	Choubey Narayan	CPI	1,45,937	44.77	34,124	10.46
33	Jhargram (ST)	Jadunath Kisku	CPM	1,59,433	46.34	Amiya Kumar Kisku	INC	1,11,838	32.51	47,595	13.83
34	Purulia	Chittaranjan Mahata	AIFB	2,00,985	68.33	Pashupati Mahato	INC	84,433	28.70	1,16,552	39.63
35	Bankura	Mondal Bijoy	JP	1,75,664	57.04	Shankar Narayan Singh Deo	INC	95,587	31.04	80,077	26.00
36	Vishnupur (SC)	Ajit Kumar Saha	CPM	2,44,370	67.30	Gour Chandra Lohar	INC	1,13,996	31.39	1,30,374	35.91
37	Durgapur (SC)	Krishna Chandra Haldar	CPM	2,18,833	63.20	Manoranjan Pramanik	INC	1,27,402	36.80	91,431	26.40
38	Asansol	Robin Sen	CPM	1,63,492	59.07	Syed Mohammad Jalal	INC	91,265	32.97	72,227	26.10
39	Burdwan	Raj Krishna Dawn	JP	1,90,318	53.69	Shyama Prasad Kundu	INC	1,19,315	33.66	71,003	20.03
40	Katwa	Dhirendra Nath Basu	INC	1,79,927	49.94	Syed Mansur Habibullah	CPM	1,68,047	46.64	11,880	3.30
41	Bolpur	Saradish Roy	CPM	1,28,963	50.19	Durga Banerjee	CPI	93,012	36.20	35,951	13.99
42	Birbhum (SC)	Gadadhar Saha	CPM	1,36,517	49.00	Birendaban Saha	INC	1,05,968	38.04	30,549	10.96

== Post-election Union Council of Ministers from West Bengal ==
#	Name	Constituency	Designation	Department	From	To	Party
1	Pratap Chandra Chunder	Calcutta North East	Cabinet Minister	Education, Social Welfare and Culture	26 March 1977	28 July 1979	JP
2	Saugata Roy	Barrackpore	Minister of State	Petroleum, Chemicals and Fertilizers	4 August 1979	14 January 1980	INC(U)

== See also ==
- Politics of West Bengal
- 1977 West Bengal Legislative Assembly election
