= Jhantipahari =

Jhantipahari Jhanti-Pahari
- Census Town
- Nickname: JPH
- Location in West Bengal, India Jhantipahari (India)
- Coordinates: 23.369744°N 86.902708°E
- Country: India
- State: West Bengal
- District: Bankura

Area
  - Total: 3.8876 km^{2} (1.5010 sq mi)

Population (2011)
  - Total: 5,326
  - Density: 1,370/km^{2} (3,548/sq mi)

Languages*
  - Official: Bengali, Santali, English
- Time zone: UTC+5:30 (IST)
- PIN: 722137
- Telephone/STD code: 03242
- Lok Sabha constituency: Bankura
- Vidhan Sabha constituency: Chhatna
- Website: bankura.gov.in

Jhantipahari (also written as Jhanti Pahari) is a census town in the Chhatna CD block in the Bankura Sadar subdivision of the Bankura district in the state of West Bengal, India.

== Geography ==
Places in Bankura Sadar subdivision in Bankura district
M: municipal town/ city, CT: census town, R: rural/ urban centre, H: hill centre, T: temple/ religious centre, B: barrage
Owing to space constraints in the small map, the actual locations in a larger map may vary slightly

=== Location ===
Jhantipahari is located at 23.369744°N 86.902708°E.

=== Area overview ===
The map alongside shows the Bankura Sadar subdivision of Bankura district. Physiographically, this area is part of the Bankura Uplands in the west gradually merging with the Bankura-Bishnupur Rarh Plains in the north-east. The western portions are characterised by undulating terrain with many hills and ridges. The area is having a gradual descent from the Chota Nagpur Plateau. The soil is laterite red and hard beds are covered with scrub jungle and sal wood. Gradually it gives way to just uneven rolling lands but the soil continues to be lateritic. There are coal mines in the northern part, along the Damodar River. It is a predominantly rural area with 89% of the population living in rural areas and only 11% living in the urban areas.

Note: The map alongside presents some of the notable locations in the subdivision. All places marked in the map are linked in the larger full screen map.

== Demographics ==
According to the 2011 Census of India, Jhanti Pahari had a total population of 5,326, of which 2,726 (51%) were males and 2,600 (49%) were females. There were 562 persons in the age range of 0–6 years. The total number of literate persons in Jhanti Pahari was 3,682 (77.29% of the population over 6 years).

.*For language details see Chhatna (community development block)#Language and religion

== Infrastructure ==
According to the District Census Handbook 2011, Bankura, Jhanti Pahari covered an area of 3.8876 km^{2}. Among the civic amenities, it had 6 km roads with both open and covered drains, the protected water supply involved tap water from treated sources, tubewell/ borehole. It has almost every household with electric connections. Among the medical facilities it has 1 hospital, 3 dispensary/ Clinics, 1 Pathology Lab, 7 medicine shops including 1 MEDPLUS shop. Among the educational facilities it has 3 Govt primary schools, 2 Private Primary School,1 Secondary school, 1 Higher Secondary school, the nearest general degree college at Chhatna, Bankura 23 km away. Among the social cultural and recreational facilities, it had 1 cinema theatre, It has 1 public library with 1 reading room, Among annual Sports Events mainly Yuva Utsav. - A Sports & Culture Event, Jhantipahari Champions Trophy - a Cricket event, A Yearly Volleyball Event, a yearly Gully Cricket Night event. Three important commodities it produced were rice, mustard oil, flour. It has the branch offices of 1 private commercial bank and 1 non-agricultural credit society.

It had 7 sports ground, 11 temples. Else there are 1 Police Out Post, 10 mills Including Rice and Oil Mills, 1 cement factory, 6 Poltry firms, 2 fish-veri, 2 Clothing Wholesaler & 2 Grocery Retailer shop along with more than 70 variety shops, 2 Bike Showrooms, 5 dhaba hotel,1 Restaurant, 7 Sweet shops, 6 Garages. It has the branch office of 1 private commercial bank, ATM, tathya seva kendra, 1 gramin bank and 1 non-agricultural credit society. The Jhatipahari high school had achieved a Madhyamik board-stand record of 9th position in 2006.

== Economy ==
This village cultivates Rice mill, Mustard Oil mill, Fish & various vegetables. A Poltry firm factory also lies within the district. Once there were ongoing approx 21 Mills at a high level of production that is being supplied across bankura and some neighbour districts during 1990 - 2008. One of the popular mill is Kamala rice mill and popular item that the village produced here is Hiramoti oil. Currently this village has well developed in some essential aspects like Education, Banking and finance, Cultivation, Transport.

== Transport ==
Jhantipahari railway station is on the Kharagpur-Bankura-Adra line of South Eastern Railway.

Jhantipahari Bus stand that connects Bankura-Raniganj-Saotaldihi, Bankura-Kashipur, Bankura-Kampalpur-Purulia regions. A huge commercial commuters used for an Iron Factory situated nearby in Jorhira for transporting Iron Raw materials via rail station to factory warehouse. Private taxies, auto rickshaws, hand rickshaws are available to make public transport more suitable across the village.

== Education ==
Jhantipahari High School is a Bengali-medium coeducational institution established in 1945. It has facilities for teaching from class V to class XII. The school has 12 computers, a library with 500 books and a playground.

== Healthcare ==
There is a primary health centre at Jhantipahari.
