= Saldiha =

- Village
- Location in West Bengal, India Saldiha (India)
- Coordinates: 23.1814°N 86.8093°E
- Country: India
- State: West Bengal
- District: Bankura
- Elevation: 139 m (456 ft)

Population (2011)
  - Total: 2,504

Languages*
  - Official: Bengali, Santali, English
- Time zone: UTC+5:30 (IST)
- PIN: 722173 (Jorda)
- Telephone/STD code: 03241
- Lok Sabha constituency: Bankura
- Vidhan Sabha constituency: Chhatna
- Website: bankura.gov.in

Saldiha is a village in Chhatna CD block in Bankura Sadar subdivision of Bankura district in the state of West Bengal, India

== Geography ==
Places in Bankura Sadar subdivision in Bankura district
M: municipal town/ city, CT: census town, R: rural/ urban centre, H: hill centre, T: temple/ religious centre, B: barrage
Owing to space constraints in the small map, the actual locations in a larger map may vary slightly

=== Location ===
Saldiha is located at 23.1814°N 86.8093°E.

=== Area overview ===
The map alongside shows the Bankura Sadar subdivision of Bankura district. Physiographically, this area is part of the Bankura Uplands in the west gradually merging with the Bankura-Bishnupur Rarh Plains in the north-east. The western portions are characterised by undulating terrain with many hills and ridges. The area is having a gradual descent from the Chota Nagpur Plateau. The soil is laterite red and hard beds are covered with scrub jungle and sal wood. Gradually it gives way to just uneven rolling lands but the soil continues to be lateritic. There are coal mines in the northern part, along the Damodar River. It is a predominantly rural area with 89% of the population living in rural areas and only 11% living in the urban areas.

Note: The map alongside presents some of the notable locations in the subdivision. All places marked in the map are linked in the larger full screen map.

== Demographics ==
As per 2011 Census of India Shaldiha had a total population of 2,504 of which 1,290 (52%) were males and 1,214 (48%) were females. Population below 6 years was 321. The total number of literates in Shaldiha was 1,429 (65.46% of the population over 6 years).

.*For language details see Chhatna (community development block)#Language and religion

== Education ==
Saldiha College was established in 1966 with the efforts of a group of people that included Aswini Kumar Pati, Aryya Kumar Banerjee, Dr. Rama Ranjan Mukherjee, Ramchandan, P.C.Ingty and others. Affiliated with the University of Burdwan, it offers honours courses in Bengali, Sanskrit, English, history, political science, economics, physics, chemistry, mathematics, zoology, and general courses in arts, science and commerce. Saldiha College is a recognised study centre of the Vidyasagar University, Directorate of Distance Education, for post graduate courses. It has hostel facilities – three for boys and one for girls.

Saldiha Junior High School is a Bengali-medium coeducational institution established in 2009. It has facilities for teaching from class V to class VIII.
