= Ekteswar =

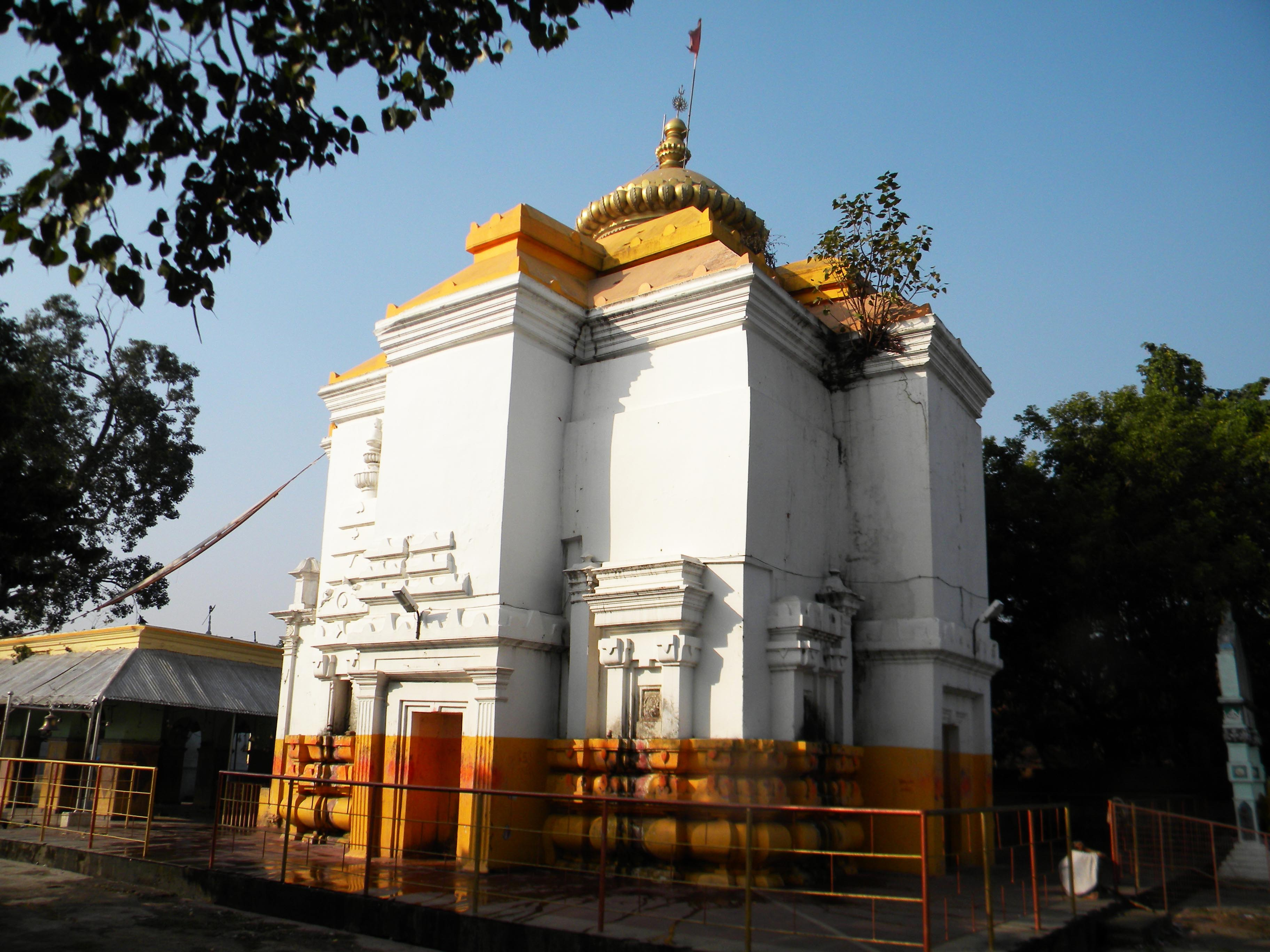
- Ekteshwar Temple, Bankura

- Location in West Bengal Ekteswar (India)
- Coordinates: 23.2107800°N 87.0920800°E
- Country: India
- State: West Bengal
- District: Bankura
- Time zone: UTC+5:30 (IST)

Ekteswar was earlier a village and now a part of the outskirts of Bankura town in Bankura district, in the Indian state of West Bengal. It is situated on the bank of Dwarakeswar River.

== Geography ==
Places in Bankura Sadar subdivision in Bankura district
M: Municipal town/ city, CT: census town, R: rural/ urban centre, H: hill centre, T: temple/ religious centre, B: barrage
Owing to space constraints in the small map, the actual locations in a larger map may vary slightly

=== Location ===
Ekteswar is located at 23.2107800°N 87.0920800°E.

Note: The map alongside presents some of the notable locations in the subdivision. All places marked in the map are linked in the larger full screen map.

== Ekteswar Temple ==
The place derives its name from a temple dedicated to Shiva, called Ekteswar. It was built by the Rajas of Bishnupur. The temple was built of laterite, but had subsequent additions of sandstone and brick. Charak Puja is celebrated in the Bengali month of Choitro with great enthusiasm.

The Ekteswar Temple is a unique one enshrining Ekapaada Murthy - a manifestation of Shiva.

Ekteswar temple has its speciality. It is a solid structure, not generally seen in Bengal. The temple was not built in the Bengal style. The top has probably faced damage and so it seems incomplete.

The deity at Ekteswar is believed by many to be Ekpadeswar, but the present deity is not so. Whether it was so in the past cannot be said with certainty. According to mythology, Shiva himself meditated in a boundary dispute between Mallabhum and Samantabhum kingdoms and as such stands as arbitrator of their fate.

== Ekteswar picture gallery ==
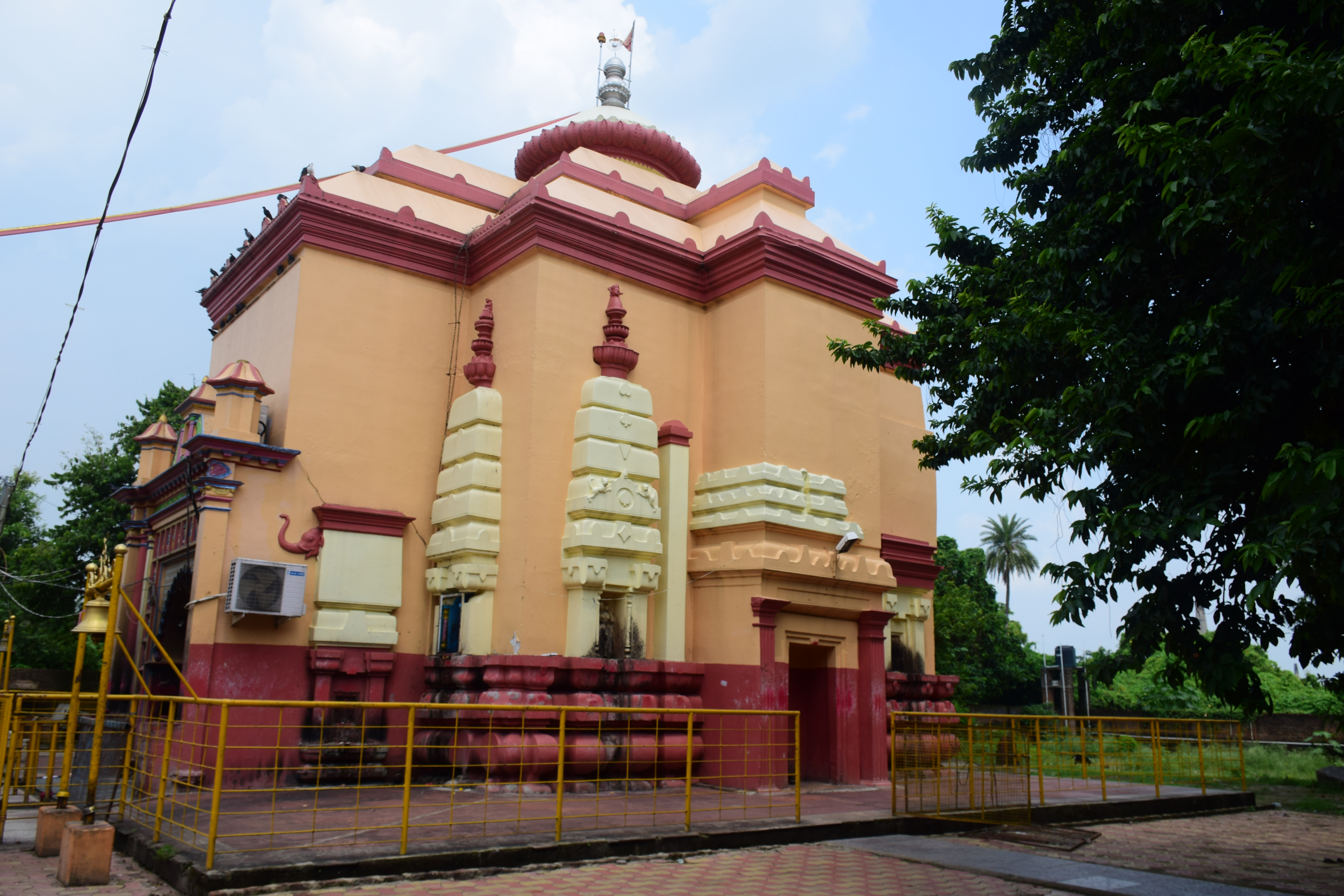
Shiva temple

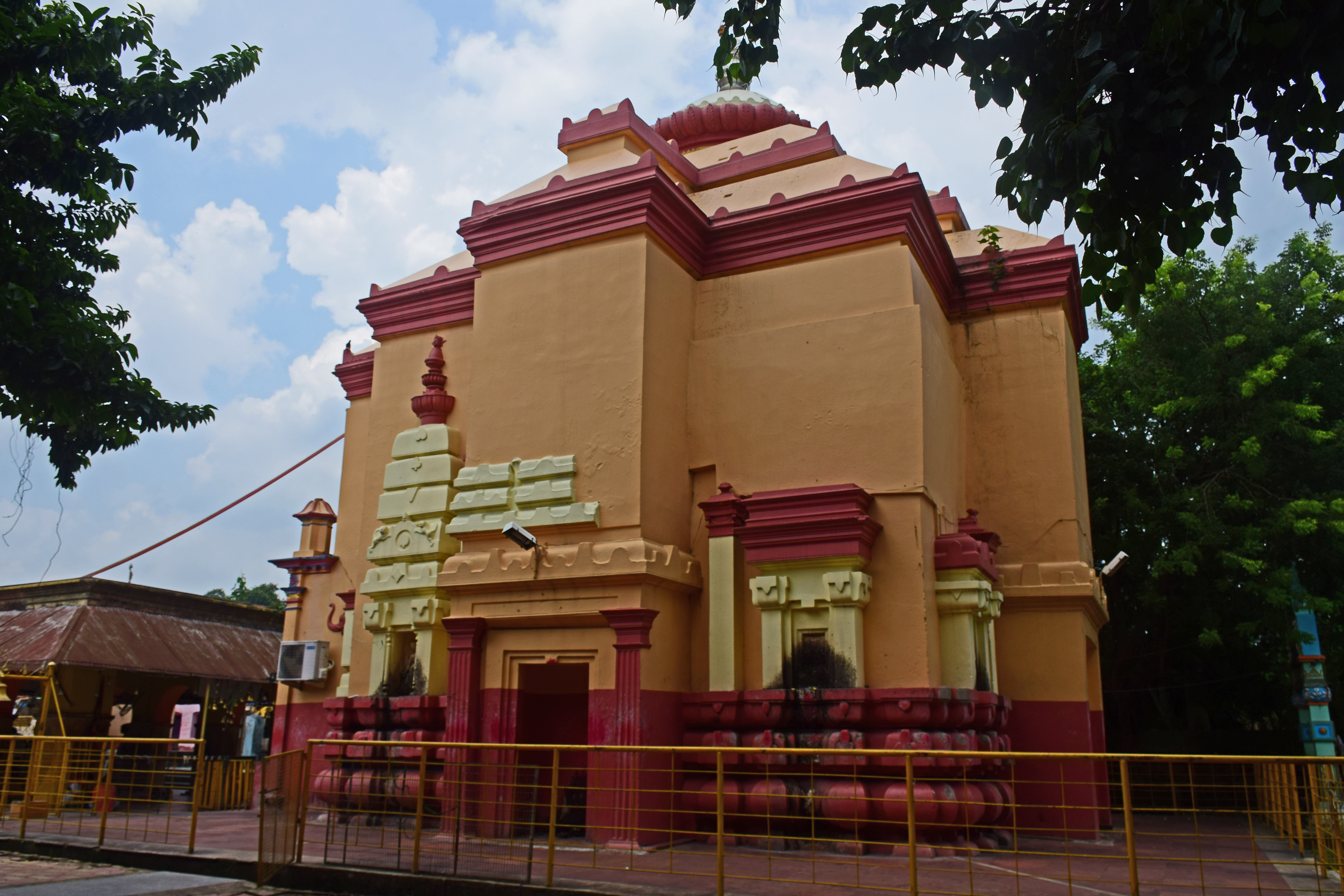
Shiva temple

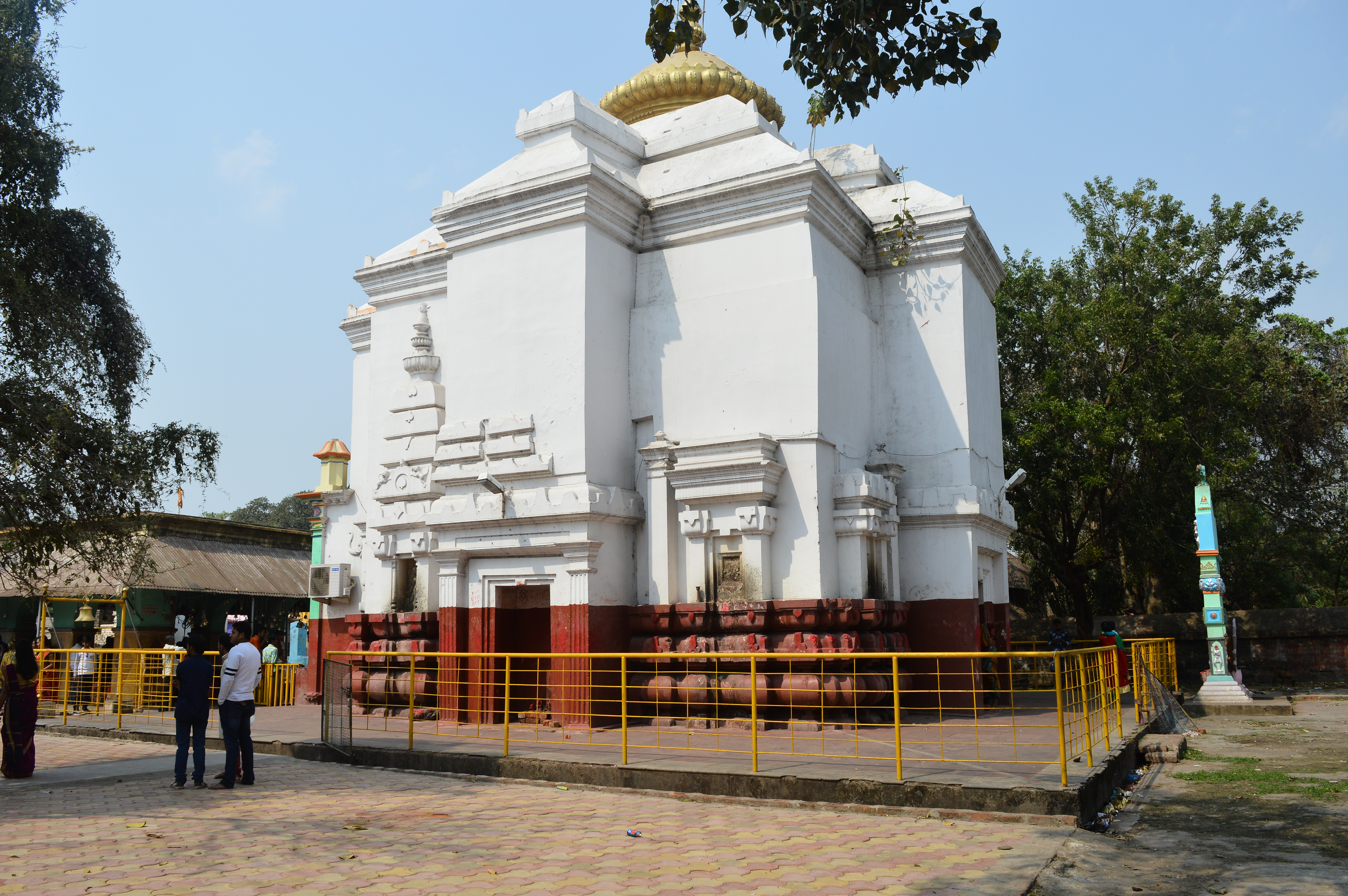
Shiva temple

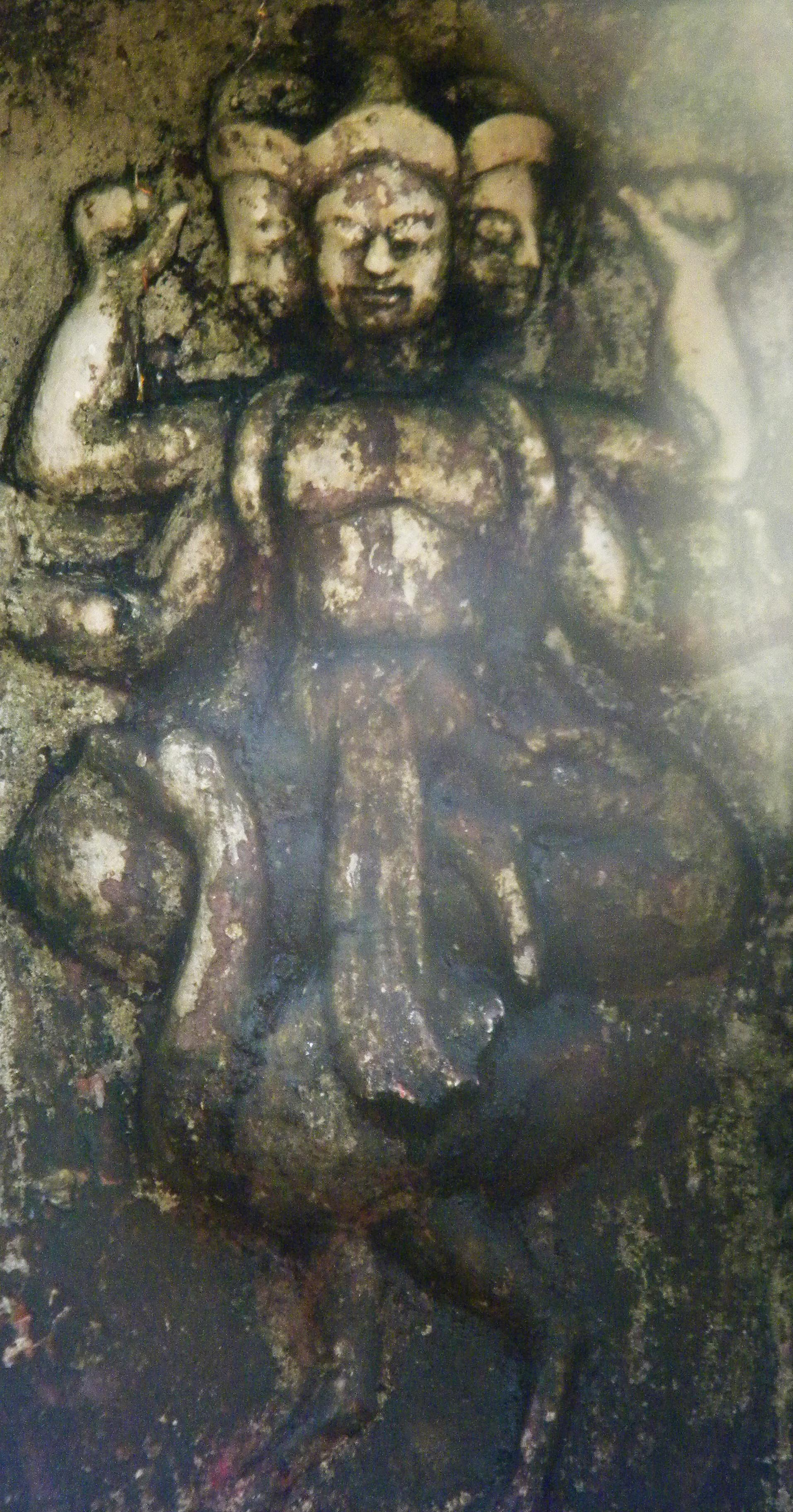
Brahma

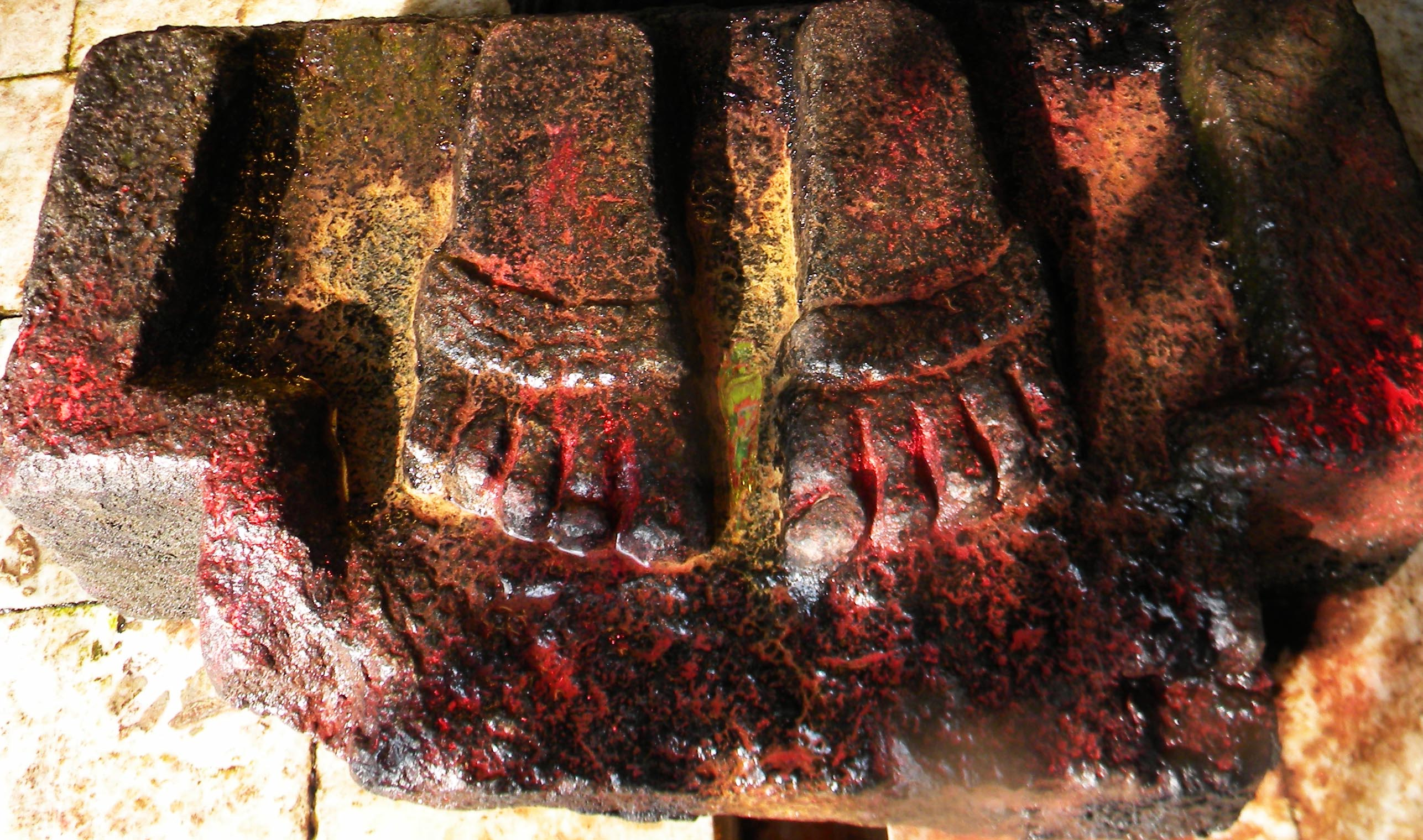
Footptint

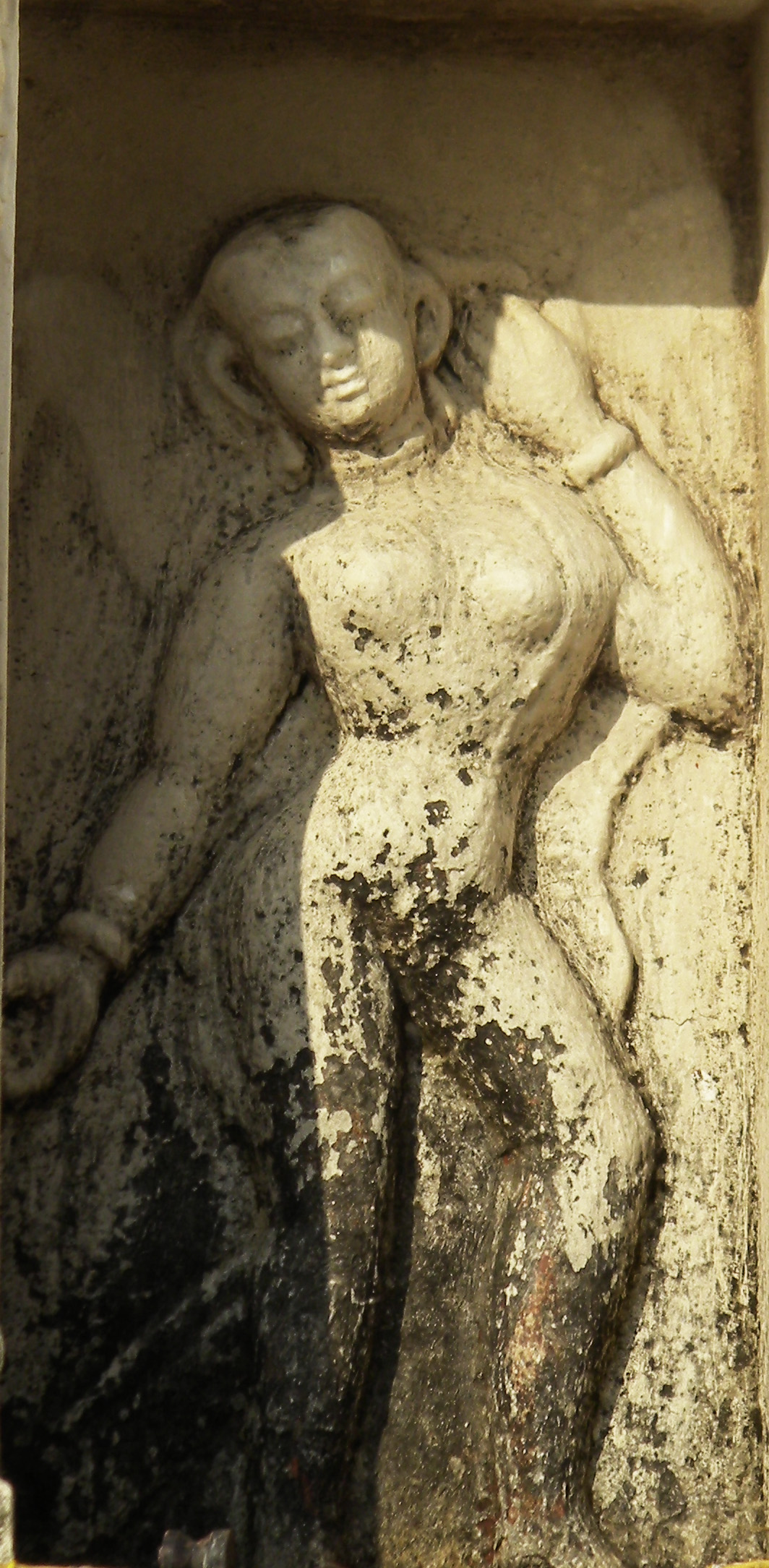
Dancer

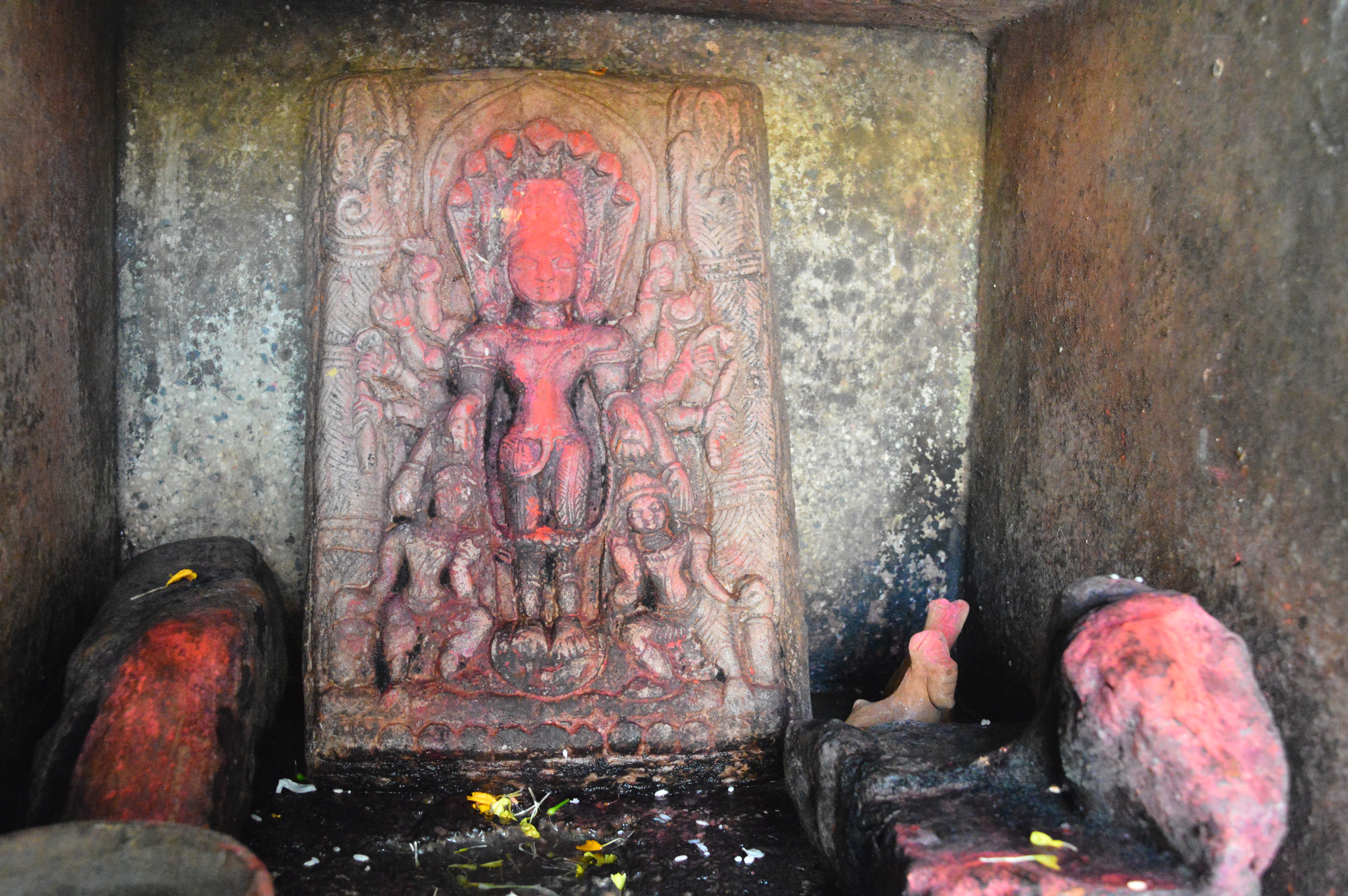
Dwadasbhuj Vishnu

See also - Bengal temple architecture
