= Jagannath Kolay =

Indian politician

Member of Parliament, Lok Sabha
- In office 1952–1957
- Constituency: Bankura, West Bengal

Personal details
- Born: June 1913 Calcutta, Bengal Presidency, British India
- Died: November 1977 (aged 64) Calcutta, West Bengal, India
- Citizenship: India
- Party: Indian National Congress
- Spouse: Monica
- Children: Sipra, Chitra, Debjani and Joydeep

Jagannath Kolay is an Indian politician. He was elected to the Lok Sabha, lower house of the Parliament of India from Bankura, West Bengal in the 1952 Indian general election as a member of the Indian National Congress.
