= Dhirendra Nath Layek =

Indian politician

Member of the West Bengal Legislative Assembly
- In office 2016–2021
- Preceded by: Subhasis Batabyal
- Succeeded by: Satyanarayan Mukhopadhyay
- Constituency: Chhatna

Personal details
- Party: Revolutionary Socialist Party
- Profession: Politician

Dhirendra Nath Layek is an Indian politician from West Bengal. He was elected as a Member of the Legislative Assembly in 2016 West Bengal Legislative Assembly election from Chhatna, as a member of the Revolutionary Socialist Party.
