= Chhatna =

- Village
- Location in West Bengal, India Chhatna (India)
- Coordinates: 23°18′06.3″N 86°58′57.8″E
- Country: India
- State: West Bengal
- District: Bankura

Languages
  - Official: Bengali, Santali, English
- Time zone: UTC+5:30 (IST)
- PIN: 722132 (Chhatna)
- Telephone/STD code: 03241
- Lok Sabha constituency: Bankura
- Vidhan Sabha constituency: Chhatna
- Website: bankura.gov.in

Chhatna is a village and a gram panchayat in the Chhatna CD block in the Bankura Sadar subdivision of the Bankura district in the state of West Bengal, India.

== History ==
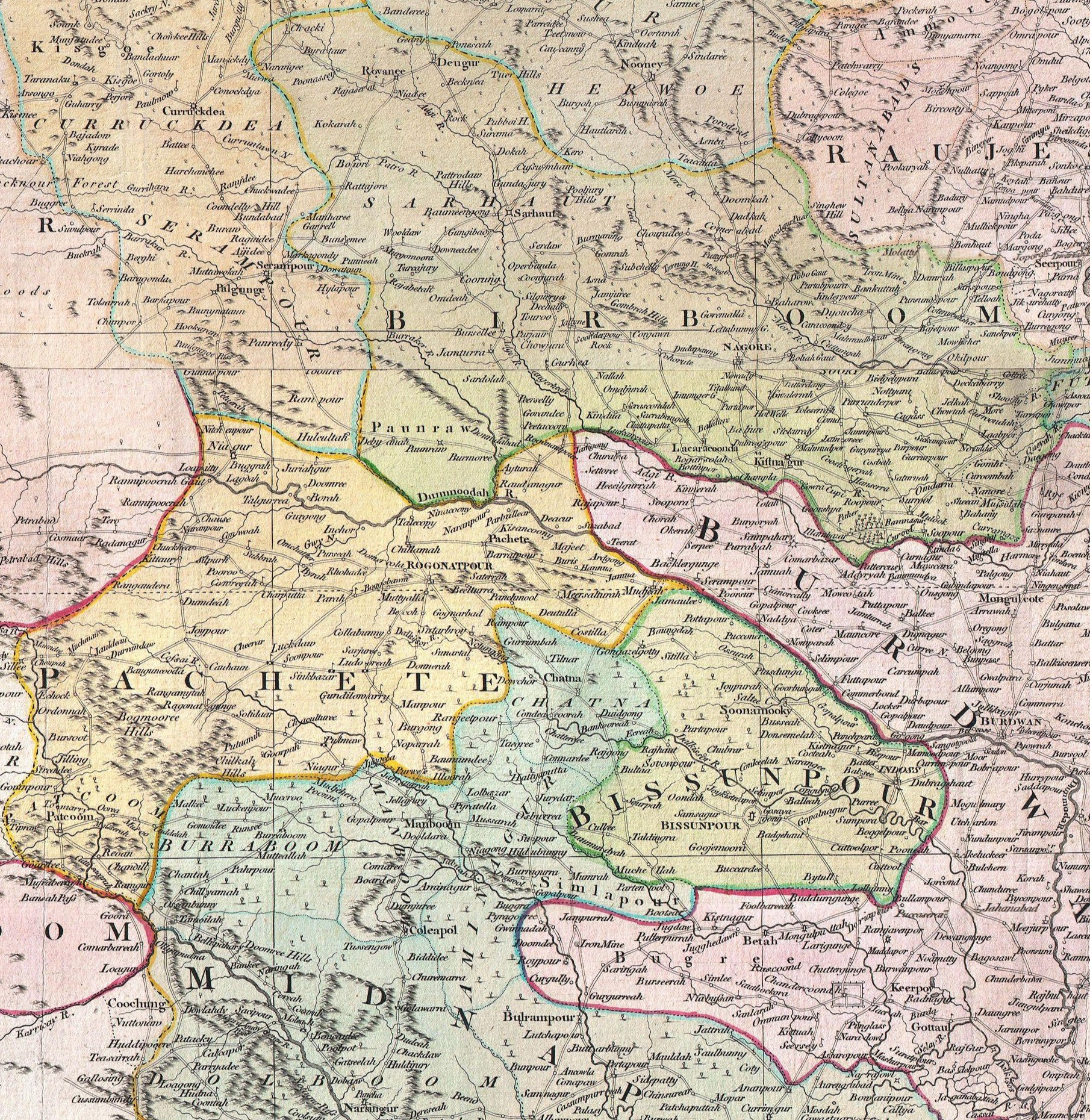
Chhatna, located in the Jungle Mahals region, as depicted on a 1776 map by James Rennell.

According to the historian Binoy Ghosh, three places claimed to be the home of the medieval lyrical poet of Bengal, Chandidas – Chhatna in Bankura district, Nanoor in Birbhum district and Ketugram in Bardhaman district. The issue became more complicated with conflicting claims clouding the historical scenario. Three persons associated with the name of Chandidas emerged and they have been identified separately with the prefix ‘Baru’, ‘Dwija’ and ‘Din’.

In the 14th-15th century, Chhatna was the capital of a kingdom named Samantabhum. The feudatory ruling family of Samantabhum was established by Sankha Roy. According to local hearsay, two brothers, Chandidas and Devidas came from outside and settled in Chhatna under the patronage of Hamir Uttar Roy, grandson of Sankha Roy. Devidas was appointed priest in the temple of Basuli Devi and Chandidas was a poet. In 1916, Basanta Ranjan Roy Bidvatballava of Beliatore found an unpublished manuscript of Chandidas, edited it and had it published under the title Srikrishnakirtan. Another factor in favour of Chhatna is the widespread worship of Basuli Devi in and around Chhatna, something not seen in the Birbhum-Bardhaman area. In Birbhum the deity worshipped was Bisalakshmi Devi. However, the name Basuli seems to have been derived from Bisalakshmi. Hamir Uttar Roy ruled from 1353 to 1404 AD. From the dates of composition of Srikrishnakirtan, it is evident that Chandidas lived during the rule of Hamir Uttar Roy. It is generally accepted that Baru Chandidas belonged to Chhatna.

== Geography ==
Places in Bankura Sadar subdivision in Bankura district
M: municipal town/ city, CT: census town, R: rural/ urban centre, H: hill centre, T: temple/religious centre, B: barrage
Owing to space constraints in the small map, the actual locations in a larger map may vary slightly

=== Location ===
Chhatna is located at 23°18′06.3″N 86°58′57.8″E.

=== Area overview ===
The map alongside shows the Bankura Sadar subdivision of Bankura district. Physiographically, this area is part of the Bankura Uplands in the west gradually merging with the Bankura-Bishnupur Rarh Plains in the north-east. The western portions are characterised by undulating terrain with many hills and ridges. The area is having a gradual descent from the Chota Nagpur Plateau. The soil is laterite, red and hard beds are covered with scrub jungle and sal wood. Gradually it gives way to just uneven rolling lands but the soil continues to be lateritic. There are coal mines in the northern part, along the Damodar River. It is a predominantly rural area with 89% of the population living in rural areas and only 11% living in the urban areas.

Note: The map alongside presents some of the notable locations in the subdivision. All places marked in the map are linked in the larger full screen map.

== Civic administration ==
=== CD block HQ ===
The headquarters of Chhatna CD block are located at Chhatna.

=== Police station ===
Chhatna police station has jurisdiction over Chhatna CD block. The area covered is 441 km^{2}.

== Transport ==
State Highway 8 running from Santaldih (in Purulia district) to Majhdia (in Nadia district) passes through Chhatna.

Chhatna railway station is on the Kharagpur–Bankura–Adra line of South Eastern railway.

== Education ==
Chhatna Chandidas Mahavidyalaya was established at Ghoramuli in 2007. It is affiliated to the Bankura University and offers honours courses in Bengali, English, history and sociology, and a general course in arts.

The College of Agriculture, Chhatna, an extended campus of Bidhan Chandra Krishi Vishwavidyalaya, was started in 2015.

Chhatna Chandidas Vidyapith is a Bengali-medium coeducational institution established in 1948. It has facilities for teaching from class V to class XII. The school has 10 computers, a library with 3,072 books and a playground.

Chhatna Basudev Bidyamandir is a Bengali-medium boys only institution established in 1972. It has facilities for teaching from class V to class X. The school has 10 computers, a library with 315 books and a playground.

Chhatna Basuli Balika Banipith is a Bengali-medium girls only institution established in 1975. It has facilities for teaching from class V to class X. The school has a library with 500 books.

== Culture ==
David J. McCutchion mentions the Vasuli temple at Chhatna as a pancha-ratna built in 1871.

The temple of Basuli Devi, where Chandidas is believed to have worshipped, is now in ruins.

== Healthcare ==
Chhatna Rural Hospital, with 30 beds at Chhatna, is the major government medical facility in the Chhatna CD block. There are primary health centres at Jorhia (with 10 beds), Salchura (Kamalpur) (with 2 beds), Jhantipahari (with 6 beds) and Bhagabanpur (with 6 beds).

Chhatna Superspecialty Hospital has started functioning.
