= Ekteswar temple =

Hindu temple in India

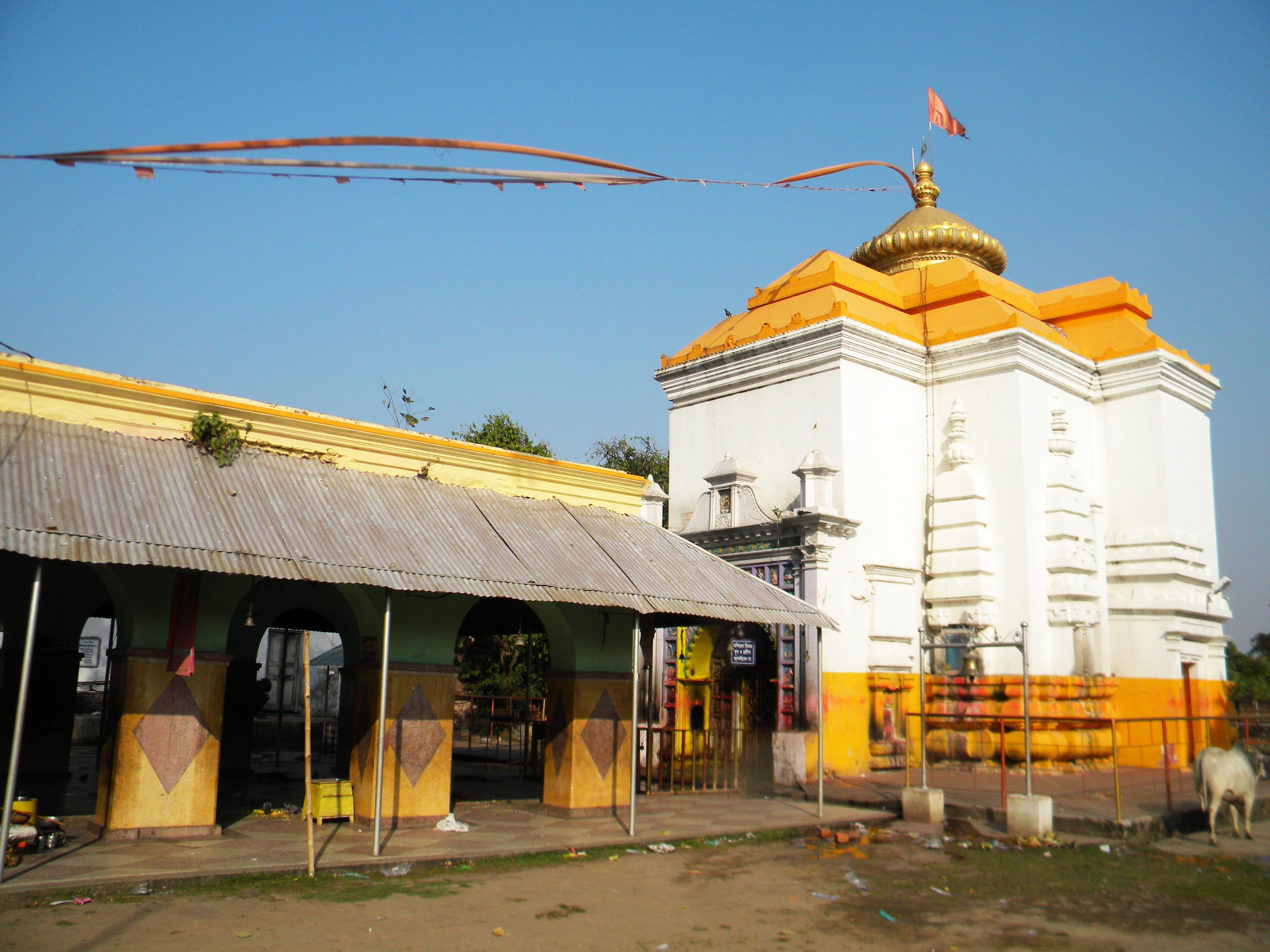

- Location in India Ekteswar temple (West Bengal)

Religion
- Affiliation: Hinduism
- District: Bankura
- Deity: Shiva (Ekapada)
- Festivals: Maha Shivaratri; Gajan; Charak Puja

Location
- Location: Ekteswar
- State: West Bengal
- Country: India
- Coordinates: 23°12′36″N 87°05′02″E

Architecture
- Type: Temple
- Style: Rekha deul
- Founder: Raghunath Malla
- Established: 1626; 400 years ago
- Height (max): 45ft

Ekteswar temple is a Hindu temple dedicated to Shiva, is located at Ekteswar, Bankura district, in West Bengal.

== About ==
The Ekteswar temple is lying on the bank of Dwarakeswar River, which is 10 kilometers away from Bankura town. It is dedicated to Lord Shiva, particularly associated with the deity's form known as Ekapada Murthy.

== History ==
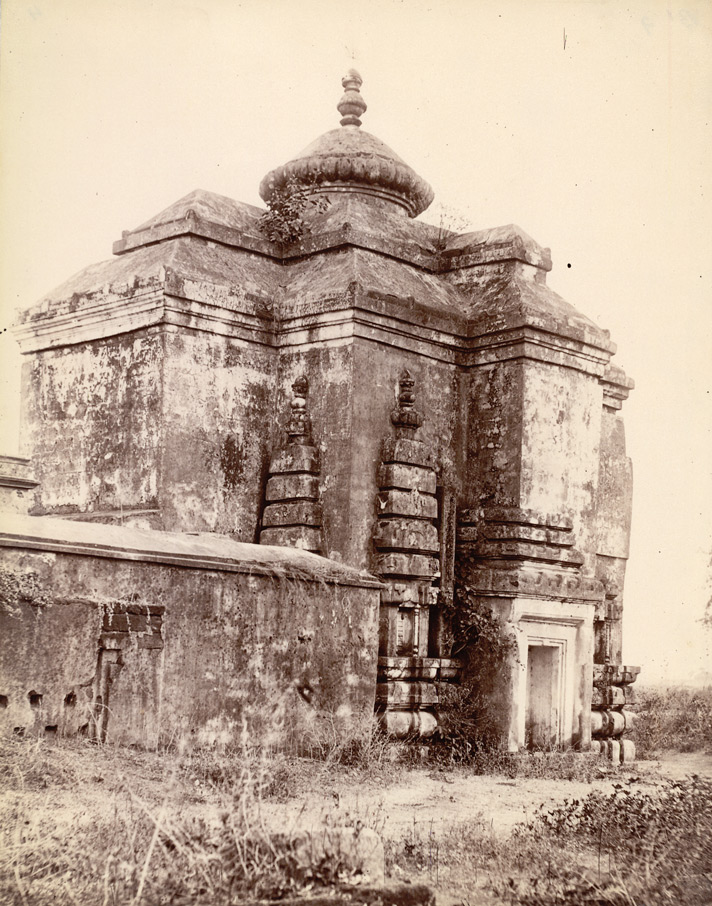
Ekteswar temple in 1872

There is also a legend that in the past, when a dispute arose over the boundary between Mallabhum and Samantabhum, Lord Mahadev himself resolved the issue. However, according to another popular legend, Lord Shiva himself meditated to resolve this boundary dispute between the two kingdoms. At the junction of the two borders, as a symbol of unity, King Raghunath Malla of Mallabhum built the Ekteswar Shiva Temple and initiated the celebration of Ekteswar's Gajan festival. According to Acharya Jogeshchandra Roy bidyanidhi, "The Vedas mention 'Eka Padeshwar,' which over time has transformed into the name 'Ekteswar.' In the Ekteswar temple, Lord Shiva is worshiped as 'Ekapada Murti' (one-legged deity). Such a form of Shiva is not found anywhere else, making it extremely rare."
