= Shankar Narayan Singh Deo =

Indian politician (born 1922)

Member of Parliament, Lok Sabha
- In office 1971–1977
- Preceded by: J.M.Biswas
- Succeeded by: Bijoy Mondal
- Constituency: Bankura, West Bengal

Personal details
- Born: 1922
- Party: Indian National Congress
- Spouse: Naraini Devi

Shankar Narayan Singh Deo (born 1922) is an Indian politician. He was elected to the Lok Sabha, lower house of the Parliament of India from Bankura, West Bengal in the 1971 Indian general election as a member of the Indian National Congress.
