= Saldiha College =

College in West Bengal

- Type: Undergraduate college Public college
- Established: 1966; 60 years ago
- Affiliations: Bankura University
- President: Sumit Nath
- Principal: Dr. Sanjoy Mukherjee (TIC)
- Location: Saldiha, West Bengal, 722173, India; 23.1706699°N 86.8109846°E
- Campus: Rural
- Website: Saldiha College

- Location within West Bengal Location within India

Saldiha College, established in 1966, is the general degree college in Saldiha, Chhatna Block, Bankura district. offers undergraduate courses in arts, commerce and sciences. It is affiliated to Bankura University.

== Departments ==
=== Science ===
- Chemistry
- Physics
- Mathematics
- Zoology
- Botany (General)
- Physiology (General)

=== Arts and Commerce ===
- Bengali
- English
- Sanskrit
- History
- Political Science
- Economics
- Santali (General)
- Commerce

== Accreditation ==
Recently, Saldiha College has been re-accredited and awarded B+ grade by the National Assessment and Accreditation Council (NAAC). The college is also recognized by the University Grants Commission (UGC).

== See also ==
- List of institutions of higher education in West Bengal
- Education in India
- Education in West Bengal
