= Susunia =

Hill in West Bengal, India

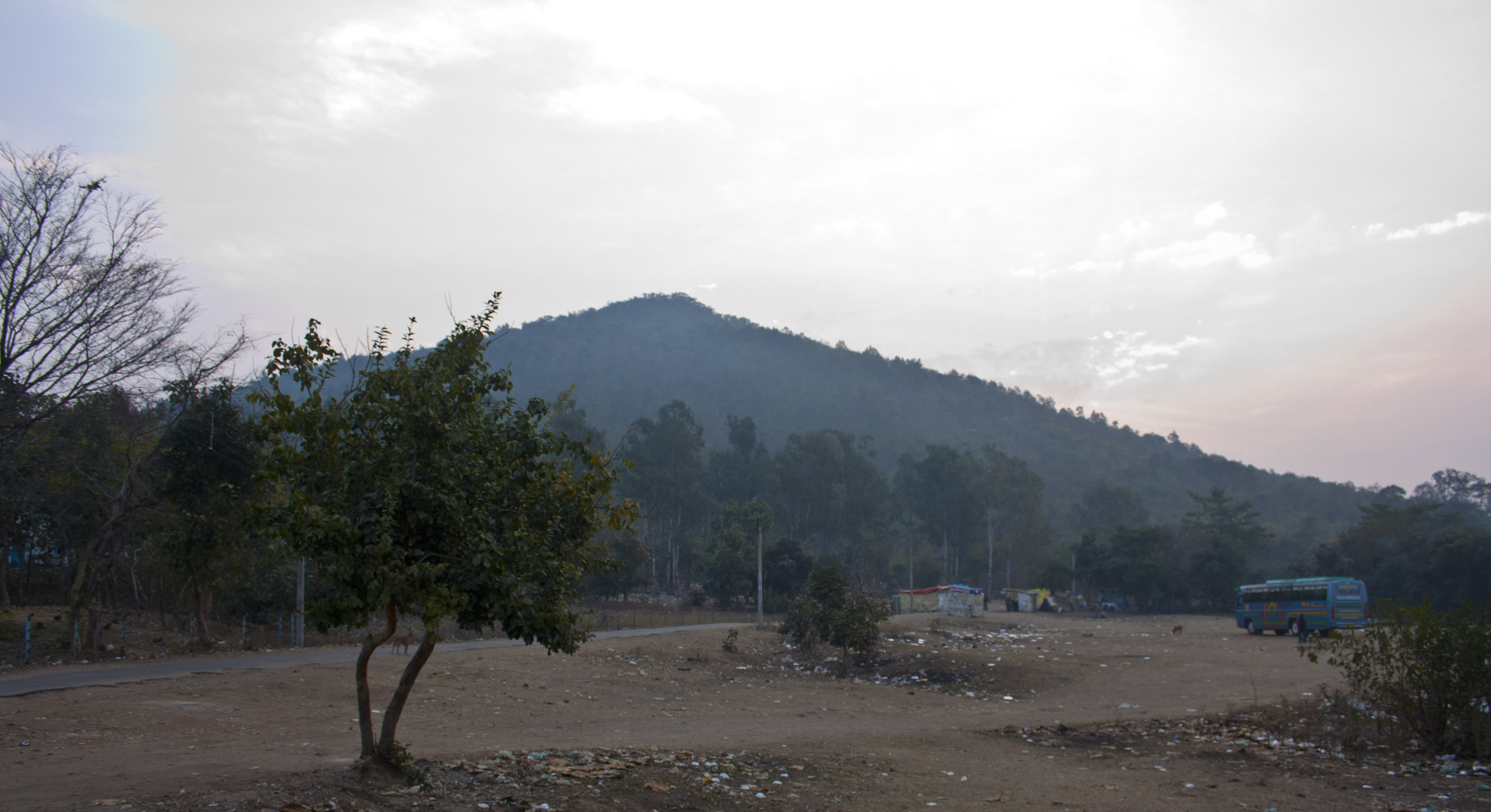
- Front view of Susunia hill

Highest point
- Elevation: 448 m (1,470 ft)

Geography
- Places in Bankura Sadar subdivision in Bankura district. Key: M: municipal town/ city, C: census town, R: rural/ urban centre, H: hill centre, T: temple/ religious centre, B: barrage Mouse over or touch press for feature details. Owing to space constraints in the small map, the locations in the larger map on click through may vary slightly
- Location: Chhatna, Bankura district, West Bengal, India
- Parent range: Chota Nagpur Plateau

Susunia is a hill of southern West Bengal, India that is a part of the Eastern Ghats and is in the north-western part of Bankura District.

== Geography ==
=== Location ===
Susunia is located at 23°24′N 86°59′E.

=== Area overview ===
The map alongside shows the Bankura Sadar subdivision of Bankura district. Geographically, this area is part of the Bankura Uplands in the west gradually merging with the Bankura-Bishnupur Rarh Plains in the north-east. The western portions are characterised by undulating terrain with many hills and ridges. The area is having a gradual descent from the Chota Nagpur Plateau. The soil is laterite red and hard beds are covered with scrub jungle and sal wood. Gradually it gives way to just uneven rolling lands but the soil continues to be lateritic. There are coal mines in the northern part, along the Damodar River. It is a predominantly rural area with 89% of the population living in rural areas and only 11% living in the urban areas.

== History ==
Susunia village itself is home to stone-carving craftsmen. Susunia is an important archaeological site in Bankura district, yielding stone age tools. It is believed that there earlier was a fort built by King Chandravarman. Some 4th-century inscriptions are there, referring to a place called Pushkarana, once the capital of Chandravarman. Modern-day Pakhanna is considered to be ancient Pushkarana. The rock-edict reads that- The devotee of 'Chakkaswami' (Lord Vishnu), the King of Pushkarana, son of the King Simhavarmana, King Chandravarmana offers the revenue of the village named 'Dhoso' for the purpose of worship to his Lord Vishnu. There is a symbol of 'Wheel' or 'Chakra' near the rock-edict and towards the lower left side of the wheel, there is another line written in a script, not deciphered yet, probably the obscure 'Samkhalipi' (Conch shaped Script!), as opined by some experts.

Susunia hill from the top

Susunia is a rock climbing centre. It is 10 km North-East of Chhatna. Chhatna is 13 km from Bankura town on the Bankura-Purulia road.

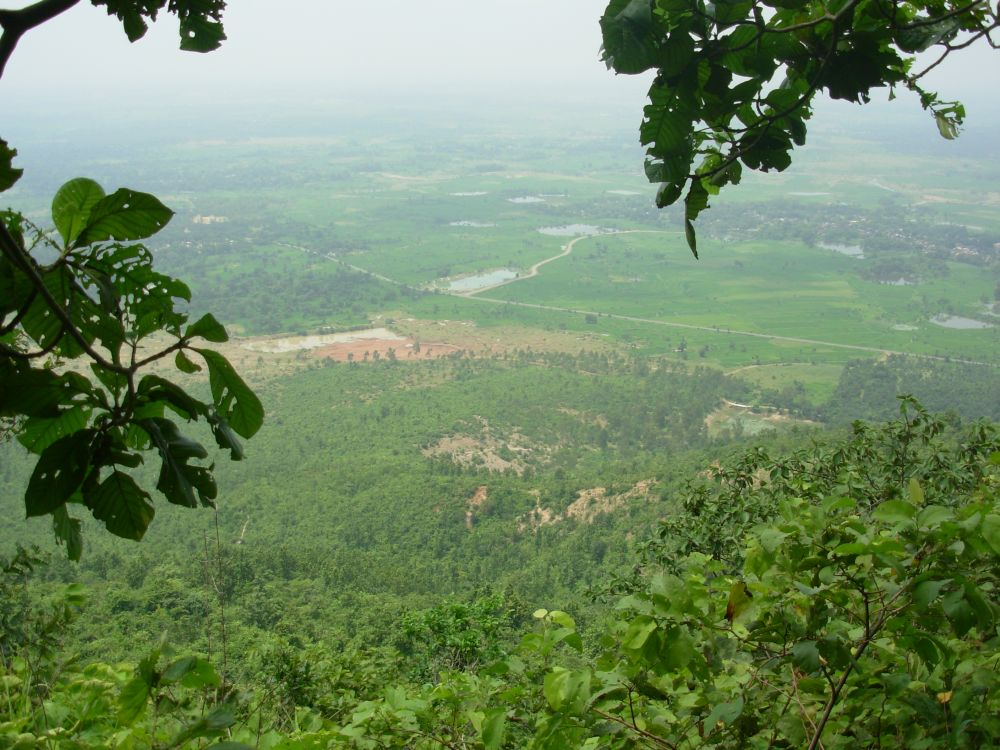
View of eastern side of the hill from the top

== Culture ==
Two villages in the vicinity of Susunia have Dhokra craftsmen - Netkamla in the Saltora police station area and Bindhyajam in the Chhatna police station area.

== Gallery ==
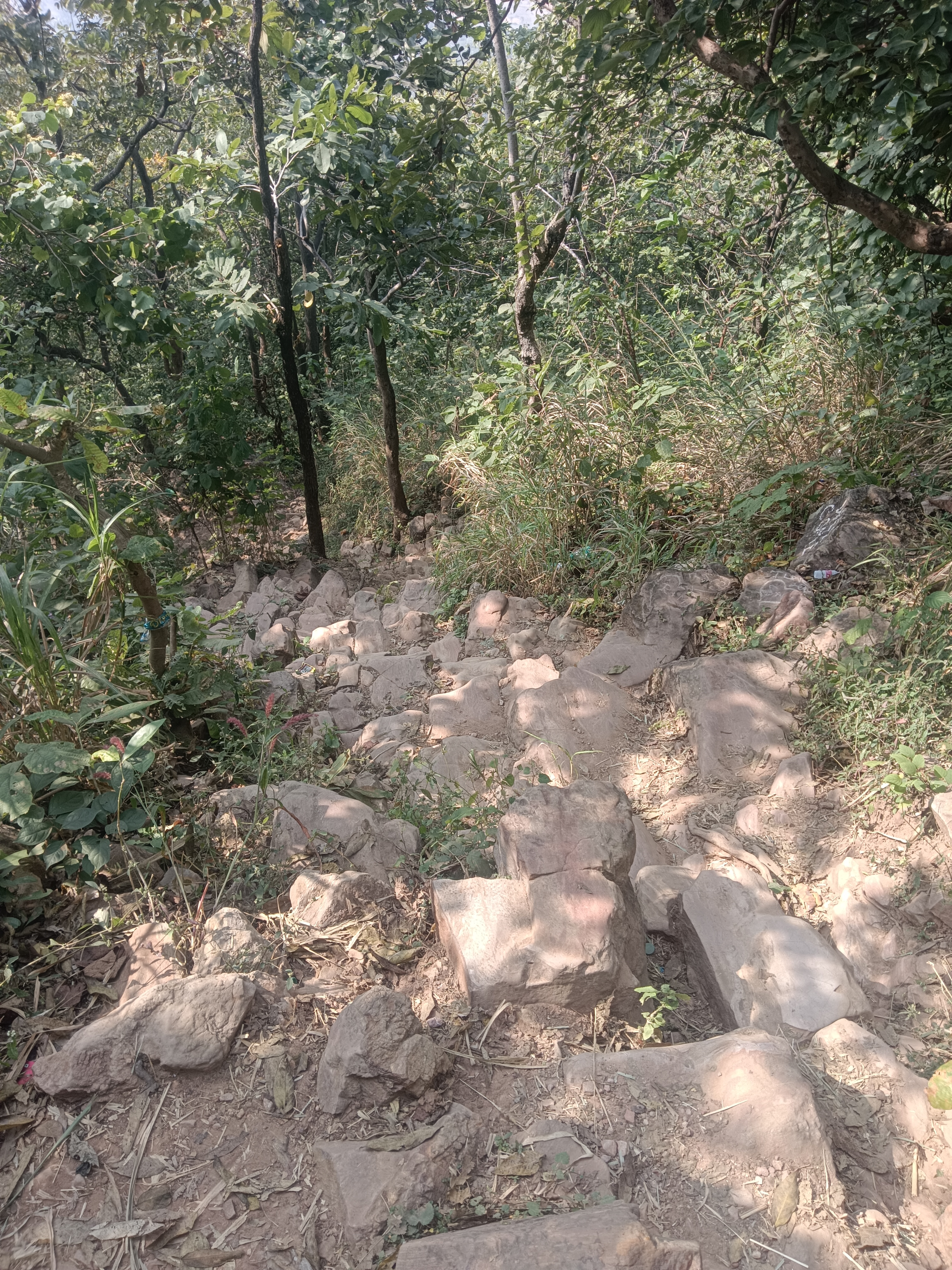

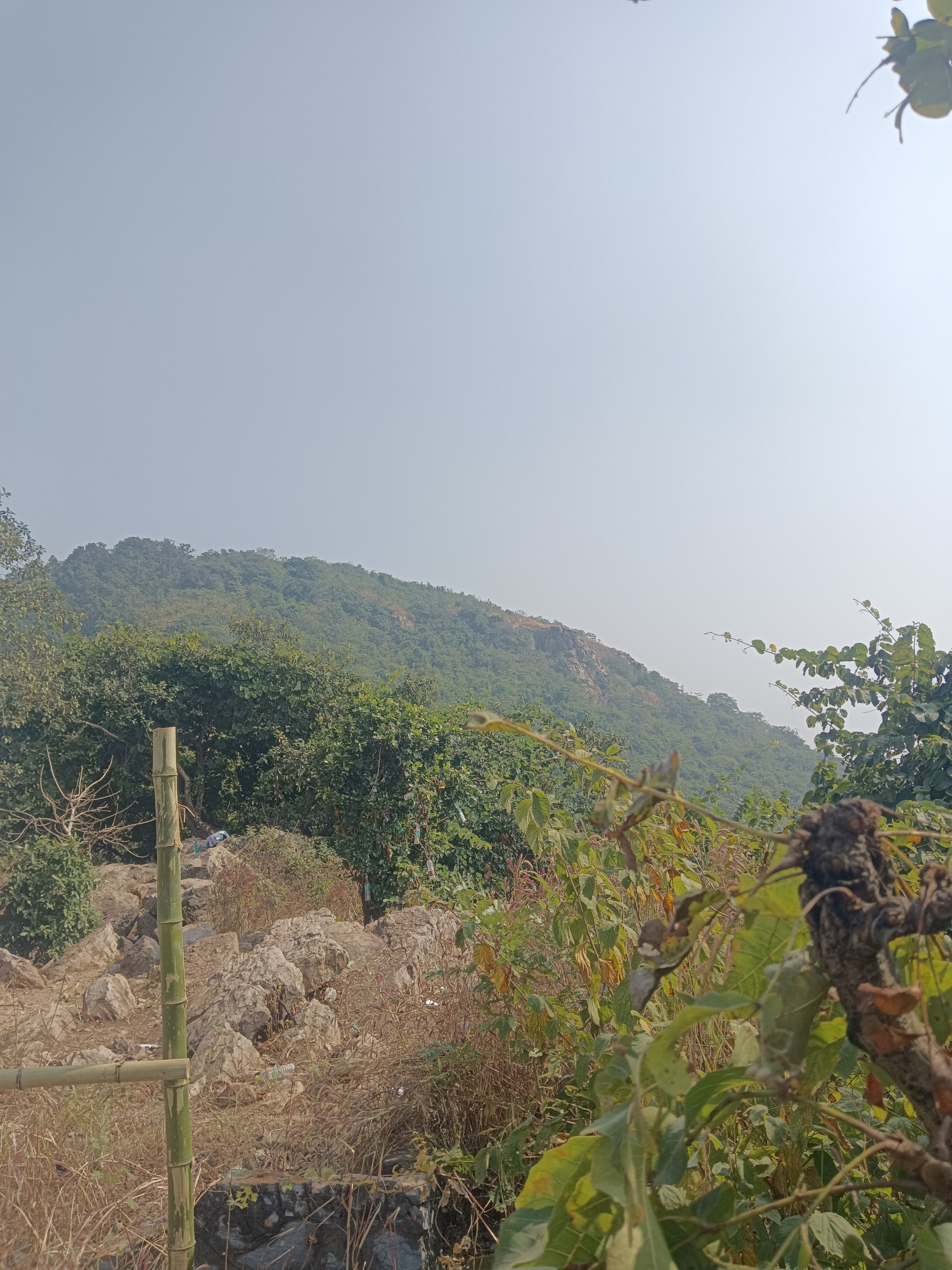
