= Satyanarayan Mukhopadhyay =

Indian politician

Member of the West Bengal Legislative Assembly
- In office 2 May 2021 – Incumbent
- Preceded by: Dhirendra Nath Layek
- Constituency: Chhatna

Personal details
- Party: Bharatiya Janata Party
- Education: B.Ed, B.A. (Hons.)
- Alma mater: Calcutta University
- Profession: Assistant Teacher

Satyanarayan Mukhopadhyay is an Indian politician from Bharatiya Janata Party. In May 2021, he was elected as a member of the West Bengal Legislative Assembly from Chhatna. He defeated Subasish Batabyal of All India Trinamool Congress by 7,164 votes in 2021 West Bengal Assembly election. He retained the seat in the 2026 West Bengal Legislative Assembly election but on BJP ticket.
