= Bijoy Mondal =

Indian politician (born 1924)

Member of Parliament, Lok Sabha
- In office 1977–1980
- Preceded by: Sankar Narayan Singh Deo
- Succeeded by: Basudeb Acharia
- Constituency: Bankura, West Bengal

Personal details
- Born: 1 December 1924 Andharthole Village, Bankura, Bengal Presidency, British India
- Citizenship: India
- Party: Janata Party
- Other political affiliations: Hindu Mahasabha, Bharatiya Jana Sangh

Bijoy Kumar Mondal (born 1 December 1924) is an Indian politician. He was elected to the Lok Sabha, the lower house of the Parliament of India from, Bankura, West Bengal, in the 1977 Indian general election as a member of the Janata Party.
