= Samantabhum =

Coordinates: 23°18′06″N 86°58′58″E

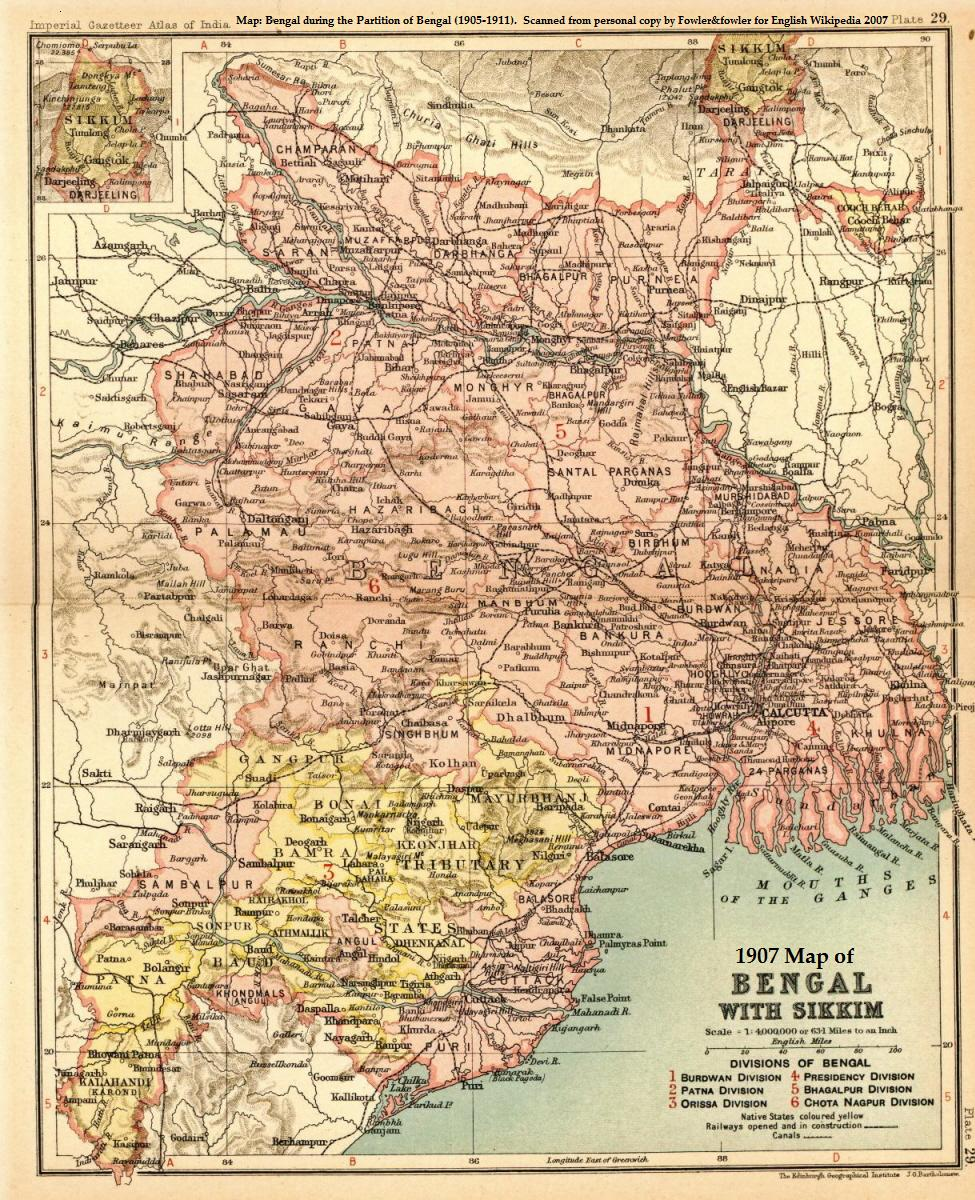
1907 Map of Bengal with Sikkim

Samantabhum was the name given to the tract of country in the Chhatna area in present Bankura district in the Indian state of West Bengal.

== History ==
Tradition has it that this tract was conquered in 1403 AD by Sankha Ray, a samanta or general of the emperor of Delhi. His son, Hamir Uttar Ray, enlarged the territories. His son, Bir Hambir Ray, was attacked by one Bhawani Jharah, with the assistance of the Raja of Panchakot, and nearly finished off the royal family. Twelve sons of Bir Hambir Ray escaped, later returned, killed the usurper and regained the kingdom. For some time ruled the kingdom but later married one of their daughters to Nisanka Narayan, a kshatriya from Sikari Fatehpur, and made him the Raja. The family ruled for many years but finally lost formal control.
