= Chhatna Assembly constituency =

Assembly constituency in West Bengal, India

Chhatna
- Constituency No. 248 for the West Bengal Legislative Assembly
- Interactive Map Outlining Chhatna Assembly Constituency

Constituency details
- Country: India
- Region: East India
- State: West Bengal
- District: Bankura
- Lok Sabha constituency: Bankura
- Established: 1951
- Total electors: 194,663
- Reservation: None

Member of Legislative Assembly
- 18th West Bengal Legislative Assembly
- Incumbent Satyanarayan Mukhopadhyay
- Party: BJP
- Alliance: NDA
- Elected year: 2026

Chhatna Assembly constituency is an assembly constituency in Bankura district in the Indian state of West Bengal.

== Overview ==
As per orders of the Delimitation Commission, No. 248 Chhatna Assembly constituency is composed of the following: Chhatna community development block; Veduasol, Brahmandiha, Hatgram, Indpur and Raghunathpur gram panchayats of Indpur community development block.

Chhatna Assembly constituency is part of No. 36 Bankura (Lok Sabha constituency).

== Members of the Legislative Assembly ==
Election	Member	Party
1952	Probodh Chandra Dutta	Hindu Mahasabha
1952	Kamalakanta Hembram	Indian National Congress
1957	Kamalakanta Hembram	Indian National Congress
1957	Dhirandranath Chattopadhyay	Indian National Congress
1962	Kamalakanta Hembram	Indian National Congress
1967	J Koley	Indian National Congress
1969	Sudarshan Singh	Samyukta Socialist Party
1971	Kamalakanta Hembram	Indian National Congress
1972	Kamalakanta Hembram	Indian National Congress
1977	Subhas Goswami	Revolutionary Socialist Party
1982	Subhas Goswami	Revolutionary Socialist Party
1987	Subhas Goswami	Revolutionary Socialist Party
1991	Subhas Goswami	Revolutionary Socialist Party
1996	Subhas Goswami	Revolutionary Socialist Party
2001	Subhas Goswami	Revolutionary Socialist Party
2006	Anath Bandhu Mondal	Revolutionary Socialist Party
2011	Subhasis Batabyal	All India Trinamool Congress
2016	Dhirendra Nath Layek	Revolutionary Socialist Party
2021	Satyanarayan Mukhopadhyay	Bharatiya Janata Party
2026	Satyanarayan Mukhopadhyay	Bharatiya Janata Party

== Election results ==
=== 2026 ===
2026 West Bengal Legislative Assembly election: Chhatna
Party	Candidate	Votes	%	±%
BJP	Satyanarayan Mukhopadhyay	125,972	56.76	+10.92
AITC	Swapan Kumar Mondal	78,798	35.5	−6.7
RSP	Rajib Lochan Kar	5,934	2.67	−2.26
INC	Partha Pratim Bose	2,359	1.06	
RLJP	Rafik Dalal	2,155	0.97	
Independent	Madhu Sudan Mandal	1,762	0.79	
SUCI(C)	Abinash Hansda	1,653	0.74	
AJUP	Dhaneswar Hansda	736	0.33	
NOTA	None of the above	2,588	1.17	−0.62
Majority		47,174	21.26	+17.62
Turnout		221,957	91.38	+10.13
BJP hold		Swing		

=== 2021 ===
2021 West Bengal Legislative Assembly election: Chhatna
Party	Candidate	Votes	%	±%
BJP	Satyanarayan Mukhopadhyay	90,233	45.84	
AITC	Subasish Batabyal	83,069	42.2	
RSP	Falguni Mukherjee	9,700	4.93	
Independent	Rabindranath Bouri	2,866	1.46	
Independent	Dinanath Chatterjee	2,602	1.32	
BMP	Dinabandhu Bauri	1,838	0.93	
NOTA	None of the above	3,514	1.79	
Majority		7,164	3.64	
Turnout		196,836	81.25	
BJP gain from RSP		Swing		

=== 2016 ===
West Bengal assembly elections, 2016: Chhatna
Party	Candidate	Votes	%	±%
RSP	Dhirendra Nath Layek	73,648	41.13	+0.58
AITC	Subhasis Batabyal	71,231	39.78	−5.80
BJP	Swapan Mukherjee	13,287	7.42	+4.69
NOTA	None of the above	7,709	4.31	+4.31
Independent	Bankim Mishra	3,339	1.86	
SUCI(C)	Sadananda Mandal	3,145	1.76	
BSP	Manik Bouri	1,661	0.93	−0.09
JMM	Satyaban Bauri	1,585	0.89	−0.79
BMP	Uttam Kundu	1,476	0.82	
CPI(ML)L	Ramnibas Baskey	1,152	0.64	−0.66
JDP	Panmani Besra	835	0.47	−0.97
Majority		2,417	1.34	
Turnout		1,79,069	80.94	+1.67
RSP gain from AITC		Swing		

=== 2011 ===
2011 West Bengal state assembly election: Chhatna
Party	Candidate	Votes	%	±%
AITC	Subhasis Batabyal	70,340	45.58	+5.21#
RSP	Anath Bandhu Mondal	62,576	40.55	−11.49
Independent	Madan Layek	6,156	3.98	
BJP	Rabindranath Mandal	4,221	2.73	
JMM	Kanai Banerjee	2,597	1.68	
JDP	Dhaneswar Hansda	2,224	1.44	
CPI(ML)L	Avijit Hansda	2,016	1.30	
Independent	Bharati Mudi	1,709	1.10	
BSP	Jagadananda Roy	1,579	1.02	
JVM(P)	Soumendra Mukherjee	89	0.05	
Majority		7,764	5.03	
Turnout		154,316	79.27	
AITC gain from RSP		Swing	+16.70#	

.# Swing calculated on Congress+Trinamool Congress vote percentages taken together in 2006.

=== 2006 ===
In the 2006 state assembly elections, Anath Bandhu Mondal of RSP won the Chhatna assembly seat defeating his nearest rival Mahasweta Mondal of Trinamool Congress. Contests in most years were multi cornered but only winners and runners are being mentioned. Subhas Goswami of RSP won the seat six times in a row defeating Swapan Mondal of Trinamool Congress/Congress in 2001 and 1996, Santi Singha of Congress in 1991, Tapan Banerjee of Congress in 1987, Arun Patra of Congress in 1982 and Kamalakanta Hembram of Congress in 1977.

=== 1972 ===
Kamalakanta Hembram of Congress won in 1972 and 1971. Sudarson Singh of SSP won in 1969. J.Koley of Congress won in 1967. Kamalakanta Hembram of Congress won in 1962. Chhatna had a dual seat in 1957. Dhirendranath Chattopadhyay and Kamalakanta Hembram, both of Congress won in 1957. Probodh Chandra Dutta of Hindu Mahasabha and Kamalakanta Hembram of Congress both won in independent India’s first election in 1951.
