= Bankura Lok Sabha constituency =

Lok Sabha constituency in West Bengal

Coordinates: 23°15′N 87°04′E

Bankura WB-36
- Lok Sabha constituency
- Interactive Map Outlining Bankura Lok Sabha Constituency

Constituency details
- Country: India
- Region: East India
- State: West Bengal
- Assembly constituencies: Raghunathpur; Saltora; Chhatna; Ranibandh; Raipur; Taldangra; Bankura
- Established: 1951
- Total electors: 17,80,580
- Reservation: None

Member of Parliament
- 18th Lok Sabha
- Incumbent Arup Chakraborty
- Party: NCPI
- Alliance: NDA
- Elected year: 2024

Bankura Lok Sabha constituency is one of the 543 parliamentary constituencies in India. While six assembly segments of No. 36 Bankura Lok Sabha constituency are in Bankura district, one assembly segment is in Purulia district.

== Assembly segments ==
Parliamentary constituencies in West Bengal - 1. Cooch Behar, 2. Alipurduars, 3. Jalpaipuri, 4. Darjeeling, 5. Raiganj, 6. Balurghat, 7. Maldaha Uttar, 8. Maldaha Dakshin, 9. Jangipur, 10. Baharampur, 11. Murshidabad, 12. Krishnanagar, 13. Ranaghat, 14. Bangaon, 15. Barrackpore, 16. Dum Dum, 17. Barasat, 18. Basirhat, 19. Jaynagar, 20. Mathurapur, 21. Diamond Harbour, 22. Jadavpur, 23. Kolkata Dakshin, 24. Kolkata Uttar, 25. Howrah, 26. Uluberia, 27. Serampore, 28. Hooghly, 29. Arambagh, 30. Tamluk, 31, Kanthi, 32. Ghatal, 33. Jhargram, 34. Medinipur, 35. Purulia, 36. Bankura, 37. Bishnupur, 38. Bardhaman Purba, 39. Bardhaman Durgapur, 40. Asansol, 41. Bolpur, 42. Birbhum

As per order of the Delimitation Commission in 2006 in respect of the delimitation of constituencies in the West Bengal, parliamentary constituency no. 36 Bankura is composed of the following assembly segments:

#	Name	District	Member	Party	2024 Lead
246	Raghunathpur (SC)	Purulia	Mamoni Bauri	BJP	AITC
247	Saltora (SC)	Bankura	Chandana Bauri	BJP	AITC
248	Chhatna	Bankura	Satyanarayan Mukhopadhyay	BJP	AITC
249	Ranibandh (ST)	Bankura	Kshudiram Tudu	BJP	AITC
250	Raipur (ST)	Bankura	Kshetra Mohan Hansda	BJP	AITC
251	Taldangra	Bankura	Souvik Patra	BJP	AITC
252	Bankura	Bankura	Niladri Sekhar Dana	BJP	BJP

Prior to delimitation, Bankura Lok Sabha constituency was composed of the following assembly segments:Para (SC) (assembly constituency no. 240), Raghunathpur (SC) (assembly constituency no. 241), Kashipur (ST) (assembly constituency no. 242), Hura (assembly constituency no. 243), Chhatna (assembly constituency no. 248), Bankura (assembly constituency no. 251) and Onda (assembly constituency no. 252)

== Members of Parliament ==
Year	Member	Party
1952	Jagannath Koley	Indian National Congress
1952	Pashupati Mandal	Indian National Congress
1957	Ramgati Banerjee	Indian National Congress
1957	Pashupati Mandal	Indian National Congress
1962	Ramgati Banerjee	Indian National Congress
1967	J. M. Biswas	Communist Party of India
1971	Sankar Narayan Singh Deo	Indian National Congress
1977	Bijoy Mondal	Janata Party
1980	Basudeb Acharia	Communist Party of India (Marxist)
1984	Basudeb Acharia	Communist Party of India (Marxist)
1989	Basudeb Acharia	Communist Party of India (Marxist)
1991	Basudeb Acharia	Communist Party of India (Marxist)
1996	Basudeb Acharia	Communist Party of India (Marxist)
1998	Basudeb Acharia	Communist Party of India (Marxist)
1999	Basudeb Acharia	Communist Party of India (Marxist)
2004	Basudeb Acharia	Communist Party of India (Marxist)
2009	Basudeb Acharia	Communist Party of India (Marxist)
2014	Moon Moon Sen	Trinamool Congress
2019	Subhas Sarkar	Bharatiya Janata Party
2024	Arup Chakraborty	Trinamool Congress
2026 (Note: Switched to NCPI as part of AITC Rebels in Lok Sabha.)	Arup Chakraborty	Nationalist Citizens Party of India

== Election results ==
Vote share of Winning candidates
2024	44.33%
2019	49.23%
2014	39.10%
2009	47.66%
2004	60.07%
1999	52.73%
1998	49.42%
1996	56.24%
1991	56.32%
1989	55.91%
1984	48.62%
1980	45.04%
1977	57.04%
1971	33.01%
1967	46.53%
1962	51.13%
1957	25.05%
1957	24.78%
1952	19.26%
1952	17.03%

=== 2024 ===
2024 Indian general elections: Bankura
Party	Candidate	Votes	%	±%
AITC	Arup Chakraborty	641,813	44.33	▲7.8
BJP	Subhas Sarkar	609,035	42.07	▼7.13
CPI(M)	Nilanjan Dasgupta	1,05,359	7.28	▼0.03
NOTA	None of the above	26,209	1.81	▲0.79
Majority		32,778	2.26	▼14.01
Turnout		14,47,674	81.30	▼2.22
AITC gain from BJP		Swing		

=== 2019 ===
2019 Indian general election: Bankura
Party	Candidate	Votes	%	±%
BJP	Dr. Subhas Sarkar	675,319	49.23	
AITC	Subrata Mukherjee	500,986	36.52	
CPI(M)	Amiya Patra	100,282	7.31	
NOTA	None of the Above	14,019	1.02	
IND	4 Independent Candidates	38,167	2.78	
OTH	8 Other Party Candidates	43,082	3.14	
Majority		174,333	12.71	
Turnout		1,372,645	83.25	
Swing to BJP from AITC		Swing		

=== 2014 ===
2014 Indian general election: Bankura
Party	Candidate	Votes	%	±%
AITC	Moon Moon Sen	483,455	39.10	
CPI(M)	Basudeb Acharia	384,949	31.14	
BJP	Subhas Kumar Sarkar	251,183	20.32	
NOTA	None of the Above	23,682	1.92	
INC	Nilmadhab Gupta	22,021	1.78	
JMM	Paresh Marandi	10,229	0.83	
SUCI(C)	Kabita Singhababu	9,125	0.74	
IND	2 Independent Candidates	13,921	1.13	
OTH	6 Other Party Candidates	37,754	3.05	
Majority		98,506	7.96	
Turnout				
Swing to AITC from CPI(M)		Swing		

=== 2009 ===
2009 Indian general election: Bankura
Party	Candidate	Votes	%	±%
CPI(M)	Basudeb Acharia	469,223	47.66	
INC	Subrata Mukherjee	361,421	36.71	
BJP	Rahul (Biswajit) Sinha	42,660	4.33	
IND	Lakshmi Sarkar	27,469	2.79	
IND	Prabir Banerjee	22,645	2.30	
JMM	Paresh Marandi	19,440	1.97	
BSP	Ganesh Ray	11,083	1.13	
Jharkhand Party	Aswini Duley	13,132	1.33	
JD(U)	Byasdeb Chakrabortty	5,554	0.56	
CPI(ML)L	Sudhir Kumar Murmu	8,007	0.81	
RDMP	Tapan Kumar Pathak	3,970	0.40	
Majority		107,802	10.95	
Turnout		984,604	77.64	
CPI(M) hold		Swing		

=== 2004 ===
2004 Indian general election: Bankura
Party	Candidate	Votes	%	±%
CPI(M)	Basudeb Acharia	417,798	60.07	
AITC	Deb Prasad Kundu (Tara)	187,469	26.95	
IND	Bhaskar Chandra Bhadra	23,553	3.39	
PDS	Natabar Bagdi	21,306	3.06	
JMM	Balaram Mahato	18,508	2.66	
SP	Rahul Sen	8,568	1.23	
BSP	Motilal Murmu	7,892	1.13	
JDP	Abhiram Besra	6,411	0.92	
AMB	Gopinath Mandi	3,982	0.57	
Majority		230,329	33.12	
Turnout		695,487		
CPI(M) hold		Swing		

=== 1999 ===
1999 Indian general election: Bankura
Party	Candidate	Votes	%	±%
CPI(M)	Basudeb Acharia	381,720	52.73	
IND	Natabar Bagdi	274,722	37.95	
INC	Bula Chatterjee	35,512	4.91	
IND	Joydev Pal	13,069	1.81	
SS	Mahesh Shah	7,444	1.03	
IND	Balaram Mahato	4,697	0.65	
AMB	Laxmi Kanta Mahata	4,569	0.63	
IND	Achintya Sagar Mahato	2,196	0.30	
Majority		106,998	14.78	
Turnout		741,303	71.19	
CPI(M) hold		Swing		

=== 1998 ===
1998 Indian general election: Bankura
Party	Candidate	Votes	%	±%
CPI(M)	Basudeb Acharia	369,695	49.42	
BJP	Sukumar Banerjee	258,112	34.51	
INC	Kashinath Misra	74,145	9.91	
JMM	Baghambar Mahato	35,676	4.77	
IND	Bhaskar Bhadra	7,749	1.04	
AMB	Laxmi Kanta Mahata	2,623	0.35	
Majority		111,583	14.91	
Turnout		766,640	74.52	
CPI(M) hold		Swing		

=== 1996 ===
1996 Indian general election: Bankura
Party	Candidate	Votes	%	±%
CPI(M)	Basudeb Acharia	420,402	56.24	
INC	Gouri Sankar Dey	191,415	25.61	
JMM	Bilam Murmu	59,372	7.94	
BJP	Gunamoy Chattopadhyay	40,213	5.38	
IND	Bhaskar Bhadra	19,191	2.57	
IND	Asim Goswami	5,803	0.78	
IND	Budhan Ram	4,458	0.60	
SS	Kalyan Mukherjee	2,668	0.36	
JMM(M)	Nandalal Kisku	2,039	0.27	
IND	Achintasagar Mahato	783	0.10	
IND	Ramlal Jadav	634	0.08	
IND	Saktipada Mukhopadhyay	525	0.07	
Majority		228,987	30.63	
Turnout		774,916	77.95	
CPI(M) hold		Swing		

=== 1991 ===
1991 Indian general election: Bankura
Party	Candidate	Votes	%	±%
CPI(M)	Basudev Acharia	374,058	56.32	
INC	Brajabasi Biswas	191,435	28.82	
BJP	Gunamoy Chatterjee	58,978	8.88	
IND	Bhaskar Bhadra	22,353	3.37	
IND	Nandalal Kisku	11,767	1.77	
Doordarshi Party	Santiram Bag	2,559	0.39	
IND	Sagar Chandra Mahato	1,422	0.21	
IND	Sakti Pada Mukhopadhyay	879	0.13	
BKUS	Ashim Goswami	694	0.10	
Majority		182,623	27.50	
Turnout		682,903	72.47	
CPI(M) hold		Swing		

=== 1989 ===
1989 Indian general election: Bankura
Party	Candidate	Votes	%	±%
CPI(M)	Basudeb Acharia	381,087	55.91	
INC	Ashis Chakrabarty	256,689	37.66	
IND	Bhaskar Bhadra	22,268	3.27	
IND	Nanda Lal Kisku	9,394	1.38	
IND	Saktipada Mukhopadhyay	3,035	0.45	
Jharkhand Party	Asok Mahata	2,689	0.39	
IND	Asim Goswami	2,269	0.33	
IND	Laxmikanta Mahata	2,211	0.32	
Doordarshi Party	Nand Lal Gupta	1,419	0.21	
IND	Anil Kumar Thakur	607	0.09	
Majority		124,398	18.25	
Turnout		694,886	75.92	
CPI(M) hold		Swing		

=== 1984 ===
1984 Indian general election: Bankura
Party	Candidate	Votes	%	±%
CPI(M)	Basudeb Acharia	268,136	48.62	
INC	Arun Kumar Bhattacharya	243,920	44.23	
SUCI(C)	Manju Chakraborti	17,202	3.12	
IND	Nandalal Majhi	11,019	2.00	
IND	Tapan Chakravarty	2,977	0.54	
IND	Saktipada Mukherjee	2,705	0.49	
IND	Shallen Mishra	2,665	0.48	
IND	Bhagbat Mahata	1,529	0.28	
IND	Saktipada Kumbhakar	946	0.17	
IND	Sagar Chandra Mahata	401	0.07	
Majority		24,216	4.39	
Turnout		567,298	73.57	
CPI(M) hold		Swing		

=== 1980 ===
1980 Indian general election: Bankura
Party	Candidate	Votes	%	±%
CPI(M)	Basudeb Acharia	199,557	45.04	
INC(I)	Shankar Narayan Singh Deo	155,646	35.13	
SUCI(C)	Ashutosh Banerjee	36,149	8.16	
IND	Shyampada Majhi	16,732	3.78	
JP	Gunamoy Chatopadhyay	16,523	3.73	
JP(S)	Basudeb Dutta	6,636	1.50	
IND	A. C. Patra	5,425	1.22	
IND	Bhagbat Mahata	3,059	0.69	
IND	Swamy Rudranand Giri	1,953	0.44	
IND	Saktipada Mukherjee	1,337	0.30	
Majority		43,911	9.91	
Turnout		459,862	63.79	
Swing to CPI(M) from JP		Swing		

=== 1977 ===
1977 Indian general election: Bankura
Party	Candidate	Votes	%	±%
JP	Bijoy Mondal	175,664	57.04	
INC	Shankar Narayan Singh Deo	95,587	31.04	
SUCI(C)	Ashutosh Banerjee	27,343	8.88	
IND	Saktipada Mukherjee	5,662	1.84	
IND	Bhutnath Ghosh	2,461	0.80	
IND	Matulal Sharma	1,223	0.40	
Majority		80,077	26.00	
Turnout		320,481	53.11	
Swing to JP from INC		Swing		

=== 1971 ===
1971 Indian general election: Bankura
Party	Candidate	Votes	%	±%
INC	Sankar Narayan Singh Deo	81,144	33.01	
CPI(M)	Mahadeb Mukherjee	55,646	22.64	
CPI	J. M. Biswas	46,723	19.01	
Bangla Congress	Haridas Mistra	29,576	12.03	
INC(O)	Jyoti Prosad Bose	14,662	5.96	
HM	Bhutnath Mahanta	9,755	3.97	
Lok Sewak Sangh	Chitta Bhusan Dasgupta	8,306	3.38	
Majority		25,498	10.37	
Turnout		262,110	48.02	
Swing to INC from CPI		Swing		

=== 1967 ===
1967 Indian general election: Bankura
Party	Candidate	Votes	%	±%
CPI	J. M. Biswas	120,590	46.53	
INC	A. Ghose	90,820	35.04	
IND	P. Banerjee	16,566	6.39	
ABJS	P. R. Mahato	16,213	6.26	
IND	P. C. Kundu	14,981	5.78	
Majority		29,770	11.49	
Turnout		273,639	52.55	
Swing to CPI from INC		Swing		

=== 1962 ===
1962 Indian general election: Bankura
Party	Candidate	Votes	%	±%
INC	Ramgati Bandopadhyay	74,674	51.13	
PSP	Kanai Lal De	47,230	32.34	
AIFB	Manoranjan Roy	24,156	16.54	
Majority		27,444	18.79	
Turnout		151,859	33.47	
INC hold		Swing		

=== 1957 ===
1957 Indian general election: Bankura (Two-member constituency)
Party	Candidate	Votes	%	±%
INC	Pashupati Mandal	152,687	25.05	
INC	Ramgati Banerjee	151,001	24.78	
IND	Biswa Nath Bauri	83,271	13.66	
HM	Bagala Mandal	82,576	13.55	
IND	Bireswar Ghose	74,591	12.24	
HM	Ashutosh Lahiri	65,328	10.72	
Majority		1,686	0.27	
Turnout		609,454	37.77	
INC hold		Swing		

=== 1952 ===
1952 Indian general election: Bankura (Two-Member Constituency)
Party	Candidate	Votes	%	±%
INC	Jagannath Koley	108,885	19.26	
INC	Pashupati Mandal	96,266	17.03	
HM	Atul Patra	90,112	15.94	
IND	Bireswar Ghose	58,122	10.28	
ABJS	Jugal Kishore Mandal	48,135	8.51	
KMPP	Gurusaday Haldar	35,998	6.37	
IND	Babulal Sareng	33,418	5.91	
IND	Jadu Mudi	27,309	4.83	
IND	Binode Maji	26,680	4.72	
IND	Ramrabi Mukherjee	25,281	4.47	
IND	Kedar Nath Chatterjee	7,904	1.40	
IND	Rishindranath Sarkar	7,257	1.28	
Majority		12,619	2.23	
Turnout		565,367	39.28	
INC win (new seat)				

== See also ==
- List of constituencies of the Lok Sabha
