= Bankura (disambiguation) =

Bankura is a city and a municipality in Bankura District in the state of West Bengal, India.

Bankura may also refer to the following geographical locations:

- Bankura district, West Bengal
- Bankura Sadar subdivision, West Bengal
- Bankura I, Community development block, West Bengal
- Bankura II, Community development block, West Bengal
- Bankura (Lok Sabha constituency), West Bengal
- Bankura (Vidhan Sabha constituency), West Bengal
- Bankura architecture, a style of traditional Bengal architecture.
