= Bankura Sadar subdivision =

- Subdivision
- Interactive map of Bankura Sadar subdivision
- Coordinates: 23.25°N 87.07°E
- Country: India
- State: West Bengal
- District: Bankura
- Headquarters: Bankura

Area
  - Total: 2,596.11 km^{2} (1,002.36 sq mi)

Population (2011)
  - Total: 1,439,148
  - Density: 554.348/km^{2} (1,435.75/sq mi)

Languages
  - Official: Bengali, English
- Time zone: UTC+5:30 (IST)
- ISO 3166 code: IN-WB
- Vehicle registration: WB
- Website: http://bankura.gov.in/

Bankura Sadar subdivision is a subdivision of the Bankura district in the state of West Bengal, India.

== Subdivisions ==
Bankura district is divided into the following administrative subdivisions:

Subdivision	Headquarters	Area km^{2}	Population (2011)	Rural Population % (2001)	Urban Population % (2001)
Bankura Sadar	Bankura	2596.11	1,439,148	89.27	11.43
Khatra	Khatra	2407.49	1,045.591	100.00	0
Bishnupur	Bishnupur	1870.75	1,111,935	91.04	8.96
Bankura district	Bankura	6882.00	3,596,674	92.63	7.37

Bankura Sadar subdivision has a density of population of 554 per km^{2}. 40.1% of the population of the district resides in this subdivision.

Places in Bankura Sadar subdivision in Bankura district
M: municipal town/ city, CT: census town, R: rural/ urban centre, H: hill centre, T: temple, B: barrage
Owing to space constraints in the small map, the actual locations in a larger map may vary slightly

== Administrative units ==
Bankura Sadar subdivision has 9 police stations, 8 community development blocks, 8 panchayat samitis, 75 gram panchayats, 1,384 inhabited villages, 1 municipality and 4 census towns. Bankura is the only municipality in this subdivision. The census towns are: Jhanti Pahari, Barjora, Bhutgerya and Beliatore. The subdivision has its headquarters at Bankura.

== Police stations ==
Police stations in Bankura Sadar subdivision have the following features and jurisdiction:

Police Station	Area covered km^{2}	Municipal Town	CD Block
Bankura	439	Bankura	Bankura I, Bankura II
Bankura Sadar Women	–	Bankura	All blocks in Bankura Sadar subdivision
Chhatna	441	–	Chhatna
Saltora	312.62	–	Saltora
Mejia	162.90	–	Mejia
Gangajalghati	371.2	–	Gangajalghati
Barjora	239.6063	–	Barjora
Beliatore	222.71	–	Barjora
Onda	499.41	–	Onda

== Blocks ==
Community development blocks in Bankura Sadar subdivision are:

CD Block	Headquarters	Area km^{2}	Population (2011)	SC %	ST %	Literacy rate %	Census Towns
Bankura I	Puabagan	171.09	107,685	37.10	6.09	68.74	
Bankura II	Bikna	220.84	140,864	29.81	2.49	73.59	
Barjora	Barjora	393.23	202,049	33.85	1.64	71.67	3
Chhatna	Chhatna	447.47	195,038	29.99	20.50	65.73	1
Gangajalghati	Amarkanan	366.47	180,974	35.27	3.96	68.11	
Mejia	Mejia	162.87	86,188	34.19	2.45	66.83	
Onda	Onda	502.46	252,984	33.18	4.92	65.82	
Saltora	Saltora	312.62	135,980	34.19	18.90	61.45	

== Gram Panchayats ==
The subdivision contains 75 gram panchayats under eight community development blocks:

- Bankura I block consists of six gram panchayats: Anchuri, Jagadalla–I, Kalapathar, Andharthole, Jagadalla–II and Kenjakura.
- Bankura II block consists of seven gram panchayats: Bikna, Kosthia, Narrah, Sanbandha, Janbedia, Mankanali and Purandarpur.
- Barjora block consists of 11 gram panchayats: Barjora, Chhandar, Hatasuria, Pokhonna, Beliator, Ghutgoria, Khanrari, Shaharjora, Brindabanpur, Godardihi and Maliyara.
- Chhatna block consists of: Arrah, Dhaban, Jirrah, Teghari, Cheenabari, Ghoshergram, Metyala, Chhatna–I, Jamtora, Shaldiha, Chhatna–II, Jhunjhka and Shushunia.
- Gangajalghati block consists of: Banasuria, Gangajalghati, Lachhmanpur, Piraboni, Barashal, Gobindadham, Latiaboni, Bhaktabandh, Kapista and Nityanandapur.
- Mejia block consists of: Ardhagram, Kushtor, Ramchandrapur, Banjora and Mejia.
- Onda block consists of: Chingani, Lodna, Nikunjapur, Ramsagar, Churamonipur, Majdiha, Onda–I, Ratanpur, Kalyani, Medinipur, Onda–II, Santor, Kantabari, Nakaijuri and Punisole.
- Saltora block consists of: Bamuntor, Gogra, Pabra, Saltora, Dhekia, Kanuri, Salma and Tiluri.

== Education ==
Bankura district had a literacy rate of 70.26% as per the provisional figures of the 2011 census. Bankura Sadar subdivision had a literacy rate of 69.56%, Khatra subdivision 69.79% and Bishnupur subdivision 71.60%.

Given in the table below is a comprehensive picture of the education scenario in Bankura district for the year 2013–14. It may be noted that primary schools include junior basic schools; middle schools, high schools and higher secondary schools include madrasahs; technical schools include junior technical schools, junior government polytechnics, industrial technical institutes, industrial training centres, nursing training institutes etc.; technical and professional colleges include engineering colleges, medical colleges, para-medical institutes, management colleges, teachers training and nursing training colleges, law colleges, art colleges, music colleges etc. Special and non-formal education centres include sishu siksha kendras, madhyamik siksha kendras, centres of Rabindra mukta vidyalaya, recognised Sanskrit tols, institutions for the blind and other handicapped persons, Anganwadi centres, reformatory schools etc.

Subdivision	Primary School		Middle School		High School		Higher Secondary School		General College, Univ		Technical / Professional Instt		Non-formal Education	
Subdivision	Institution	Student	Institution	Student	Institution	Student	Institution	Student	Institution	Student	Institution	Student	Institution	Student
Bankura Sadar	1,371	117,820	144	17,951	90	69,329	91	78,909	9	14,782	14	2,865	2,228	69,919
Khatra	1,200	86,786	113	16,805	50	28,178	112	93,919	6	13,067	6	702	1,993	51,849
Bishnupur	979	86,750	112	15,092	57	28,738	81	78,915	6	10,552	14	4,170	1,649	57,769
Bankura district	3,550	291,356	369	49,848	197	126,245	284	251,743	21	38,401	34	7,737	5,870	179,537

=== Educational institutions ===
The following institutions are located in Bankura Sadar subdivision:

- Bankura University was established in 2013.
- Bankura Sammilani Medical College at Bankura was started as a medical school in 1922 and was upgraded to a medical college in 1954. The Government of West Bengal took over the institution in 1961. The 131 bedded Bankura district hospital was merged with it in 1964.
- Bankura Unnayani Institute of Engineering at Puabagan, Bankura was established in 1998. It is affiliated to Maulana Abul Kalam Azad University of Technology. It conducts BTech. and MTech courses.
- Bankura Christian College at Bankura was established in 1903 by Weslayan Missionary Society.
- Bankura Sammilani College at Bankura was established in 1948.
- Bankura Zilla Saradamani Mahila Mahavidyapith at Bankura is a women's college established in 1973.
- Saldiha College at Saldiha was established in 1966. It has hostel facilities – three for boys and one for girls.
- Gobindaprasad Mahavidyalaya was established in 1985 at Amarkanan.
- Barjora College at Barjora was established in 1985.
- Jamini Roy College was established at Beliatore in 1986.
- Saltora Netaji Centenary College at Saltora was established in 2001.
- Chhatna Chandidas Mahavidyalaya was established at Ghoramuli, Chhatna in 2007.
- Onda Thana Mahavidyalaya was established at PO Murakata in 2007.
- Government General Degree College, Mejia at Gopalpur village, PO Mejia, was established in 2015.
- The College of Agriculture, at Chhatna, an extended campus of Bidhan Chandra Krishi Vishwavidyalaya was started in 2015.

== Healthcare ==
The table below (all data in numbers) presents an overview of the medical facilities available and patients treated in the hospitals, health centres and sub-centres in 2014 in Bankura district.

Subdivision	Health & Family Welfare Deptt, WB				Other State Govt Deptts	Local bodies	Central Govt Deptts / PSUs	NGO / Private Nursing Homes	Total	Total Number of Beds	Total Number of Doctors	Indoor Patients	Outdoor Patients
Subdivision	Hospitals	Rural Hospitals	Block Primary Health Centres	Primary Health Centres	Other State Govt Deptts	Local bodies	Central Govt Deptts / PSUs	NGO / Private Nursing Homes	Total	Total Number of Beds	Total Number of Doctors	Indoor Patients	Outdoor Patients
Bankura Sadar	2	6	2	25	3	-	2	31	71	2,628	320	147,890	2,634,248
Khatra	1	7	1	21	-	-	-	4	34	698	77	58,258	1,440,172
Bishnupur	1	5	1	23	-	-	-	11	41	698	77	68,068	1,351,349
Bankura district	4	18	4	69	3	-	2	46	146	4,152	459	274,216	5,425,769

=== Medical facilities ===
Medical facilities in Bankura Sadar subdivision are as follows:

Hospitals: (Name, location, beds)

- Bankura Sammilani Medical College and Hospital, Bankura M, 947 beds
- District Correctional Home Hospital, Bankura M, 8 beds
- Bankura Police Hospital, Bankura M, 20 beds
- Gouripur Leprosy Hospital, Gouripur, 550 beds
- RLTRRI, Gouripur, 50 beds

Rural Hospitals: (Name, CD block, location, beds)

- Gangajalghati (Amar Kanan) Rural Hospital, Gangjalghati CD block, PO Amarkanan, 30 beds
- Anchuri Rural Hospital, Bankura I CD block, Achuri, 30 beds
- Chhatna Rural Hospital, Chhatna CD block, Chhatna, 30 beds
- Saltora Rural Hospital, Saltora CD block, Saltora, 30 beds
- Barjora Rural Hospital, Barjora CD block, Barjora, 30 beds
- Onda Rural Hospital, Onda CD block, PO Medinipurgram, 30 beds

Block Primary Health Centres: (Name, CD block, location, beds)

- Kanchanpur Block Primary Health Centre, Bankura II CD Block, Kanchanpur, 15 beds
- Mejia Block Primary Health Centre, Mejia CD block, Mejia, 25 beds

Primary Health Centres : (CD block-wise)(CD block, PHC location, beds)

- Bankura I CD block: Helna Susunia (10), Kanjakura (10)
- Bankura II CD block: Narrah (4), Mankanali (10)
- Chhatna CD block: Jorhia (10), Salchura (Kamalpur) (2), Jhantipahari (6), Bhagabanpur (6)
- Saltora CD block: Gogra (10), Ituri (Tiluri) (10), Kashtora (6)
- Gangajalghati CD block: Gangajalghati (4), Ramharipur (4), Srichandrapur (10)
- Mejhia CD block: Ramchandrapur (4), Pairasol (10)
- Barjora CD block: Beliatore (10), Chhandar (4), Godardihi (Jagannathpur) (4), Pakhanna (10)
- Onda CD block: Ratanpur (10), Nakaijuri (Ghorasol) (10), Ramsagar (10), Santore (Garh Kotalpur) (10), Nikunjapur (10)

== Electoral constituencies ==
Lok Sabha (parliamentary) and Vidhan Sabha (state assembly) constituencies in Bankura district were as follows:

Lok Sabha constituency	Vidhan Sabha constituency	Reservation	CD Block and/or Gram panchayats
Bankura	Raghunathpur	SC	In Purulia district
	Saltora	SC	Saltora and Mejia CD Blocks; Banasuria, Barashal, Lachhmanpur and Latiaboni gram panchayats of Gangajalghati CD Block
	Chhatna	None	Chhatna CD Block; Veduasol, Brahmandiha, Hatgram, Indpur and Raghunathpur GPs of Indpur CD Block
	Ranibandh	ST	Ranibandh, Hirbandh and Khatra CD Blocks
	Raipur	ST	Raipur and Sarenga CD Blocks
	Taldangra	None	Bibarda, Fulmati, Harmasra, Khalgram, Panchmura and Taldangra GPs of Taldangra CD Block; Brojarajpur and Gaurbazar gram panchayats of Indpur CD Block; and Simlapal CD Block
	Bankura	None	Bankura municipality; Bankura I CD Block; and Junbedia, Mankanali and Purandarpur GPs of Bankura II CD Block
Bishnupur (SC)	Barjora	None	Barjora CD Block; and Bhaktabandh, Gangajalghati, Gobindadham, Kapista, Nityanandapur and Piraboni GPs of Gangajalghati CD Block
	Onda	None	Onda CD Block; and Bikna, Kosthia, Narrah and Sanbandha GPs of Bankura II CD Block
	Bishnupur	Open	Bishnupur municipality; Bishnupur; and Amdangra, Saltora and Satmauli GPs of Taldangra CD Block
	Katulpur	SC	Deshrahkoyalpara, Gopinathpur, Kotulpur, Lego, Mirzapur and Sihar GPs of Kotulpur CD Block; Gelia, Jagannathpur, Kuchiakol, Maynapur, Salda, Uttarbarh, Hetia, Routkhanda and Shyamnagar GPs of Joypur CD Block
	Indas	SC	Indas CD Block; Balsi I, Balsi II, Biur Betur, Jamkuri and Kushdwip GPs of Patrasayer CD Block; and Laugram, Madanmohanpur GPs of Kotulpur CD Block
	Sonamukhi	SC	Sonamukhi municipality; Sonamukhi CD Block; and Belut Rasulpur, Beersingha, Hamirpur, Narayanpur and Patrasayar GPs of Patrasayer CD Block
	Khandaghosh	None	In Bardhaman district

== Notable people ==
- Mohammad Shamsuzzoha (1934–1969) writer, professor and proctor
