= Dhatala =

Dhatala Dhatla
- Village
- Location in West Bengal, India Dhatala (India)
- Coordinates: 23°31′59.9″N 86°55′59.9″E
- Country: India
- State: West Bengal
- District: Bankura
- Established: possible before 1890
- Founder: unknown
- Named for: unknown

Government
  - Type: TMC

Population (2011)
  - Total: 2,302(approximalty)

Dhatala is a small village between Shyampur and Rampur. It is 1 km away from the village Shyampur. It is under Saltora police station.

== Schools ==
There is a primary school in the village named

- Dhatla Primary School

== Demographics ==
According to 2011 Census of India

- Total population =2,302
- Males= (51%)
- Females= (49%)
- Population below= 6 years was 300 .

== Nearest villages ==
- Telidihi (attached)
- Shyampur (1 km)
- Rampur (1.5 km)
- Saltora (7 km)
- Pathdoha (3 km)
- Kanuri (4 km)

== See also ==
- Bankura District
