= Puabagan =

Village cum city in West Bengal, India

- Village
- Location in West Bengal, India Puabagan (India)
- Coordinates: 23°12′48.2″N 87°01′08.0″E
- Country: India
- State: West Bengal
- District: Bankura

Languages
  - Official: Bengali, English
- Time zone: UTC+5:30 (IST)
- Telephone/STD code: 03241
- Lok Sabha constituency: Bankura
- Vidhan Sabha constituency: Bankura
- Website: bankura.gov.in

Puabagan is a village in the Bankura I CD block in the Bankura Sadar subdivision of the Bankura district in the state of West Bengal, India.

== Geography ==
Places in Bankura Sadar subdivision in Bankura district
M: municipal town/ city, CT: census town, R: rural/ urban centre, H: hill centre, T: temple/ religious centre, B: barrage
Owing to space constraints in the small map, the actual locations in a larger map may vary slightly

=== Location ===
Puabagan is located at 23°12′48.2″N 87°01′08.0″E.

=== Area overview ===
The map alongside shows the Bankura Sadar subdivision of Bankura district. Physiographically, this area is part of the Bankura Uplands in the west gradually merging with the Bankura-Bishnupur Rarh Plains in the north-east. The western portions are characterised by undulating terrain with many hills and ridges. The area is having a gradual descent from the Chota Nagpur Plateau. The soil is laterite red and hard beds are covered with scrub jungle and sal wood. Gradually it gives way to just uneven rolling lands but the soil continues to be lateritic. There are coal mines in the northern part, along the Damodar River. It is a predominantly rural area with 89% of the population living in rural areas and only 11% living in the urban areas.

Note: The map alongside presents some of the notable locations in the subdivision. All places marked in the map are linked in the larger full screen map.

== Civic administration ==
=== CD block HQ ===
The headquarters of Bankura I CD block are located at Puabagan.

== Demographics ==
In the 2011 census reports, Puabagan is not mentioned separately. It is possibly included in adjacent Dakshinbankati. According to the 2011 Census of India, Dakshinbankati had a total population of 1,312 of which 649 (49%) were males and 663 (51%) were females. Population below 6 years was 125. The total number of literates in Dakshinbankati was 886 (74.64% of the population over 6 years).

== Transport ==
State Highway 2, running to Malancha (in North 24 Parganas), originates from its junction with National Highway 314 at Puabagan.

== Education ==
Bankura Unnayani Institute of Engineering, established in 1998, offers B.Tech. and M.Tech. courses.

Jawahar Navodaya Vidyalaya at Puabagan, PO Bhagabandh, is an English-medium coeducational institution established in 1992. The Jawahar Navodaya Vidyalaya follows the Central Board of Secondary Education syllabus.

St. Xaviers High School at Damodarpur, PO Bhagabandh (near engineering college), is an English-medium coeducational institution established in 2007. It has facilities for teaching from class I to X. It follows the Central Board of Secondary Education syllabus. It is run by the Bisheswar Prasad Memorial Educational and Charitiable Trust. The school has 25 computers a library with 4,872 books and a play ground.

Some of the other schools in the surrounding areas are: Viekananda Siksha Niketan at Jagadalla, Jagdalla Gorabari M.G. Smriti Vidyalaya at Jagdalla, Rajgram Vivekanada Hindu Vidyalaya at Jagdalla, and Helna Susunia M.S. High School at Jagdalla.

== Healthcare ==
Anchuri Rural Hospital, with 30 beds at Achuri, is the major government medical facility in the Bankura I CD block. There are primary health centres at Helna Susunia (with 10 beds) and Kanjakura (with 10 beds).
