= Bankura II =

- Community development block
- Interactive map of Bankura II
- Coordinates: 23.2552800°N 87.0940000°E
- Country: India
- State: West Bengal
- District: Bankura

Government
  - Type: Representative democracy

Area
  - Total: 220.84 km^{2} (85.27 sq mi)
- Elevation: 89 m (292 ft)

Population (2011)
  - Total: 140,864
  - Density: 637.86/km^{2} (1,652.0/sq mi)

Languages
  - Official: Bengali, English
- Time zone: UTC+5:30 (IST)
- PIN: 722155 (Kesiakole); 722175 (Mankanali); 722176 (Narrah); 722178 (Purandapur); 722180 (Sanbandha)
- Telephone/STD code: 03241
- ISO 3166 code: IN-WB
- Vehicle registration: WB-67, WB-68
- Literacy: 73.59%
- Lok Sabha constituency: Bankura, Bishnupur
- Vidhan Sabha constituency: Bankura, Onda
- Website: bankura.gov.in

Bankura II is a community development block (CD block) that forms an administrative division in the Bankura Sadar subdivision of the Bankura district in the Indian state of West Bengal.

== History ==
=== From Bishnupur kingdom to the British Raj ===
From around the 7th century AD till around the advent of British rule, for around a millennium, history of Bankura district is identical with the rise and fall of the Hindu Rajas of Bishnupur. The Bishnupur Rajas, who were at the summit of their fortunes towards the end of the 17th century, started declining in the first half of the 18th century. First, the Maharaja of Burdwan seized the Fatehpur Mahal, and then the Maratha invasions laid waste their country.

Bishnupur was ceded to the British with the rest of Burdwan chakla in 1760. In 1787, Bishnupur was united with Birbhum to form a separate administrative unit. In 1793 it was transferred to the Burdwan collectorate. In 1879, the district acquired its present shape with the thanas of Khatra and Raipur and the outpost of Simplapal being transferred from Manbhum, and the thanas of Sonamukhi, Kotulpur and Indas being retransferred from Burdwan. However, it was known for sometime as West Burdwan and in 1881 came to be known as Bankura district.

== Geography ==
Map of Bankura District showing CD blocks and municipalities

Bikna, a constituent panchayat in the block, is located at 23°15′19″N 87°05′38″E.

Bankura II CD block is located in the central part of the district. It belongs to the Bankura-Bishnupur Rarh Plains. The elevation rises gradually in the undulating surface area but in the hilly tract it rises abruptly.

Bankura II CD block is bounded by the Gangajalghati CD block on the north, Barjora CD block on the east, Onda and Bankura I CD blocks on the south and Chhatna CD block on the west.

Bankura II CD block has an area of 220.84 km^{2}. It has 1 panchayat samity, 7 gram panchayats, 102 gram sansads (village councils), 154 mouzas and 144 inhabited villages. Bankura police station serves this block. Headquarters of this CD block is at Village: Bikna, PO Kesiakole.

Gram panchayats of Bankura II block/ panchayat samiti are: Bikna, Junbedia, Kostia, Mankanali, Narrah, Purandarpur and Sanbanda.

== Demographics ==
=== Population ===
According to the 2011 Census of India, Bankura II CD block had a total population of 140,864, all of which were rural. There were 72,302 (51%) males and 68,562 (49%) females. Population in the age range of 0 to 6 years was 15,927. Scheduled Castes numbered 41,998 (29.81%) and Scheduled Tribes numbered 3,508 (2.49%).

According to the 2001 census, Bankura II block had a total population of 123,374, out of which 63,306 were males and 60,068 were females. Bankura II block registered a population growth of 13.49 per cent during the 1991-2001 decade. Decadal growth for the district was 15.15 per cent. Decadal growth in West Bengal was 17.84 per cent.

Large villages (with 4,000+ population) in Bankura II CD block are (2011 census figures in brackets): Syamdaspur (4,714).

Other villages in Bankura II CD block are (2011 census figures in brackets): Narra (3,266), Purandarpur (2,189), Bikna (3,876), Kanchanpur (3,206), Junbede (3,493), Sanbanda (3,971), Ekteswar (2,039), and Kushtia (1,469).

=== Literacy ===
According to the 2011 census, the total number of literates in Bankura II CD block was 91,939 (73.59% of the population over 6 years) out of which males numbered 53,283 (83.22% of the male population over 6 years) and females numbered 38,656 (63.46%) of the female population over 6 years). The gender disparity (the difference between female and male literacy rates) was 19.76%.

According to the 2011 census, literacy in Bankura district was 70.26%, up from 63.44 in 2001 and 52.00% in 1991. Literacy in West Bengal was 77.08% in 2011. Literacy in India in 2011 was 74.04%.

See also – List of West Bengal districts ranked by literacy rate

Literacy in CD blocks of
Bankura district
Bankura Sadar subdivision
Saltora – 61.45%
Mejia – 66.83%
Gangajalghati – 68.11%
Chhatna – 65.73%
Bankura I – 68.74%
Bankura II – 73.59%
Barjora – 71.67%
Onda – 65.82%
Bishnupur subdivision
Indas – 71.70%
Joypur – 74.57%
Patrasayer – 64.8%
Kotulpur – 78.01%
Sonamukhi – 66.16%
Bishnupur – 66.30%
Khatra subdivision
Indpur – 67.42%
Ranibandh – 68.53%
Khatra – 72.18%
Hirbandh – 64.18%
Raipur – 71.33%
Sarenga – 74.25%
Simlapal – 68.44%
Taldangra – 70.87%
2011 Census: CD Block Wise

Primary Census Abstract Data

=== Language and religion ===
Religion in Bankura II CD block (2011)
Hinduism	97.60%
Islam	1.57%
Other (tribal religion)	0.62%
Other or not stated	0.21%

In the 2011 census Hindus numbered 137,486 and formed 97.60% of the population in Bankura II CD block. Muslims numbered 2,208 and formed 1.57% of the population. Others numbered 1,087 and formed 0.83% of the population. Others include Addi Bassi, Marang Boro, Santal, Saranath, Sari Dharma, Sarna, Alchchi, Bidin, Sant, Saevdharm, Seran, Saran, Sarin, Kheria, and other religious communities. In 2001, Hindus were 97.69% and Muslims 1.41% of the population.

Languages of Bankura II CD block (2011)
1. Bengali (97.5%)
2. Santali (1.99%)
3. Others (0.47%)

At the time of the 2011 census, 97.54% of the population spoke Bengali and 1.99% Santali as their first language.

== Rural poverty ==
In Bankura II CD block 38.48% families were living below poverty line in 2007. According to the Rural Household Survey in 2005, 28.87% of the total number of families were BPL families in the Bankura district.

== Economy ==
=== Livelihood ===
Livelihood
in Bankura II CD block
1. Cultivators (21.5%)
2. Agricultural labourers (25.9%)
3. Household industries (5.17%)
4. Other Workers (47.5%)

In the Bankura II CD block in 2011, among the class of total workers, cultivators numbered 11,288 and formed 21.49%, agricultural labourers numbered 13,578 and formed 25.85%, household industry workers numbered 2,718 and formed 5.17% and other workers numbered 24,941 and formed 47.48%. Total workers numbered 52,525 and formed 37.29% of the total population, and non-workers numbered 88,339 and formed 62.71% of the population.

Note: In the census records a person is considered a cultivator, if the person is engaged in cultivation/ supervision of land owned by self/government/institution. When a person who works on another person's land for wages in cash or kind or share, is regarded as an agricultural labourer. Household industry is defined as an industry conducted by one or more members of the family within the household or village, and one that does not qualify for registration as a factory under the Factories Act. Other workers are persons engaged in some economic activity other than cultivators, agricultural labourers and household workers. It includes factory, mining, plantation, transport and office workers, those engaged in business and commerce, teachers, entertainment artistes and so on.

=== Infrastructure ===
There are 144 inhabited villages in the Bankura II CD block, as per the District Census Handbook, Bankura, 2011. 100% villages have power supply. 141 villages (97.92%) have drinking water supply. 19 villages (13.19%) have post offices. 123 villages (85.42%) have telephones (including landlines, public call offices and mobile phones). 37 villages (35.69%) have pucca (paved) approach roads and 48 villages (33.33%) have transport communication (includes bus service, rail facility and navigable waterways). 15 villages (10.42%) have agricultural credit societies and 10 villages (6.94%) have banks.

=== Agriculture ===
There were 26 fertiliser depots, 12 seed stores and 46 fair price shops in the CD block.

In 2013-14, persons engaged in agriculture in Bankura II CD block could be classified as follows: bargadars 10.98%, patta (document) holders 9.52%, small farmers (possessing land between 1 and 2 hectares) 10.07%, marginal farmers (possessing land up to 1 hectare) 25.95% and agricultural labourers 43.48%.

In 2003-04 net area sown Bankura II CD block was 10,859 hectares and the area in which more than one crop was grown was 3,501 hectares.

In 2013-14, the total area irrigated in Bankura II CD block was 3,602 hectares, out of which 1,350 hectares by tank water, 680 hectares by river lift irrigation, 1,300 hectares by shallow tubewells, 200 hectares by open dug wells and 72 hectares by other means.

In 2013-14, Bankura II CD block produced 95,503 tonnes of Aman paddy, the main winter crop, from 32,270 hectares, 61 tonnes of Boro paddy from 19 hectares, 185 tonnes of wheat from 72 hectares, 86,596,000 tonnes of potatoes from 3,128 hectare (yield 27,684 kg per hectare). It also produced pulses and mustard.

=== Handloom and pottery industries ===
The handloom industry engages the largest number of persons in the non farm sector and hence is important in Bankura district. The handloom industry is well established in all the CD blocks of the district and includes the famous Baluchari saris. In 2004-05 Bankura II CD block had 686 looms in operation. Bankura municipality (outside the CD block) had 2,126 looms in operation.

Bankura district is famous for the artistic excellence of its pottery products that include the famous Bankura horse. The range of pottery products is categorised as follows: domestic utilities, terracota and other decorative items and roofing tiles and other heavy pottery items. The terracotta and decorative items include horse, elephant, tiger, ox, flower vase, Mansa Saj, ash-tray and other items of religious use. These are produced in the following CD blocks: Taldangra, Sonamukhi, Sarenga, Bankura I and Bankura II. Around 3,200 families were involved in pottery making in the district in 2002. 63 families were involved in Bankura II CD block.

=== Banking ===
In 2013-14, Bankura II CD block had offices of 5 commercial banks and 3 gramin banks.

=== Backward Regions Grant Fund ===
The Bankura district is listed as a backward region and receives financial support from the Backward Regions Grant Fund. The fund, created by the Government of India, is designed to redress regional imbalances in development. As of 2012, 272 districts across the country were listed under this scheme. The list includes 11 districts of West Bengal.

== Transport ==
In 2013-14, Bankura II CD block had 7 originating/ terminating bus routes.

DEMU services are available between Bankura and Masagram on the Bankura-Masagram line. There are stations at Belboni, Nobanda and Bikna.

State Highway 9 (West Bengal) running from Durgapur (in Paschim Bardhaman district) to Nayagram (in Jhargram district) passes through this CD block.

== Education ==
In 2013-14, Bankura II CD block had 127 primary schools with 12,933 students, 6 middle schools with 694 students, 8 high schools with 7,123 students and 10 higher secondary schools with 9,204 students. Bankura II CD block had 4 professional/ technical institution with 381 students and 208 institutions for special and non-formal education with 6,235 students. Bankura (municipal town) had 3 colleges and universities outside the CD Block. Bankura II CD block had 5 mass literacy centres.

See also – Education in India

According to the 2011 census, in the Bankura II CD block, among the 144 inhabited villages, 21 villages did not have a school, 37 villages had two or more primary schools, 30 villages had at least 1 primary and 1 middle school and 19 villages had at least 1 middle and 1 secondary school.

== Healthcare ==
In 2014, Bankura II CD block had 1 block primary health centre, 2 primary health centres and 1 private nursing home with total 94 beds and 5 doctors. It had 23 family welfare sub centres and 1 family welfare centre. 1,467 patients were treated indoor and 126,570 patients were treated outdoor in the hospitals, health centres and subcentres of the CD block.

Kanchanpur Block Primary Health Centre, with 15 beds at Kanchanpur, is the major government medical facility in the Bankura II CD block. There are primary health centres at Narrah (with 4 beds) and Mankanali (with 10 beds).
