= Ailakundi =

- village
- Location in West Bengal, India Ailakundi (India)
- Coordinates: 23°14′21.2″N 87°01′48.4″E
- Country: India
- State: West Bengal
- District: Bankura

Government
  - Type: Panchayati raj (India)
  - Body: Gram panchayat

Population (2011)
  - Total: 1,207

Languages
  - Official: Bengali, English
- Time zone: UTC+5:30 (IST)
- ISO 3166 code: IN-WB
- Vehicle registration: WB-

Ailakundi is a village in Bankura I Sub District in Bankura district, West Bengal, India.

== Demographics ==
According to 2011 census of India, the village has a population of 1,207; 617 are male and 590 female.
