= Shyampur =

Shyampur may refer to:

- Shyampur I (community development block), in Howrah district, West Bengal, India
- Shyampur II (community development block), in Howrah district, West Bengal, India
- Shyampur (Vidhan Sabha constituency), an assembly constituency in Howrah district, West Bengal, India
- Shyampur, Bangladesh, a neighbourhood in Dhaka, Bangladesh
- Shyampur, Bankura, a village in West Bengal, India
  - Shyampur High School
- Shyampur, Bhopal, a village in Madhya Pradesh, India
- Shyampur, Madhya Pradesh, a town in Madhya Pradesh, India
- Shyampur, Magrahat, a census town in South 24 Parganas district, West Bengal, India
- Shyampur Bhatpura, a village in Uttar Pradesh, India
- Salempur Rajputana, a census town in Haridwar district of Uttarakhand
- Syamapura Kingdom, ancient kingdom in central Thailand
