= Niladri Sekhar Dana =

Indian politician

Member of the West Bengal Legislative Assembly
- In office 2 May 2021 – Incumbent
- Preceded by: Shampa Daripa
- Constituency: Bankura

Personal details
- Born: 01/04/1966 Bankura
- Party: Bharatiya Janata Party
- Education: Graduate
- Profession: Bus Hire Charges & Retail Readymade Shop

Niladri Sekhar Dana is an Indian politician from Bharatiya Janata Party. In May 2021, he was elected as a member of the West Bengal Legislative Assembly from Bankura (constituency). He defeated Sayantika Banerjee of All India Trinamool Congress by 7,220 votes in 2021 West Bengal Assembly election.
