= Bikna =

- Village
- Location in West Bengal, India Bikna (India)
- Coordinates: 23°15′19.4″N 87°05′32.3″E
- Country: India
- State: West Bengal
- District: Bankura

Population (2011)
  - Total: 3,876

Languages
  - Official: Bengali, English
- Time zone: UTC+5:30 (IST)
- PIN: 722155 (Kesiakole)
- Telephone/STD code: 03241
- Lok Sabha constituency: Bishnupur
- Vidhan Sabha constituency: Onda
- Website: bankura.gov.in

Bikna is a village in the Bankura II CD block in the Bankura Sadar subdivision of the Bankura district in the state of West Bengal, India.

== Geography ==
Places in Bankura Sadar subdivision in Bankura district
M; municipal town/ city, CT: census town, R: rural/ urban centre, H: hill centre, T: temple/ religious centre, B: barrage
Owing to space constraints in the small map, the actual locations in a larger map may vary slightly

=== Location ===
Bikna is located at 23°15′19.4″N 87°05′32.3″E.

=== Area overview ===
The map alongside shows the Bankura Sadar subdivision of Bankura district. Physiographically, this area is part of the Bankura Uplands in the west gradually merging with the Bankura-Bishnupur Rarh Plains in the north-east. The western portions are characterised by undulating terrain with many hills and ridges. The area is having a gradual descent from the Chota Nagpur Plateau. The soil is laterite red and hard beds are covered with scrub jungle and sal wood. Gradually it gives way to just uneven rolling lands but the soil continues to be lateritic. There are coal mines in the northern part, along the Damodar River. It is a predominantly rural area with 89% of the population living in rural areas and only 11% living in the urban areas.

Note: The map alongside presents some of the notable locations in the subdivision. All places marked in the map are linked in the larger full screen map.

== Civic administration ==
=== CD block HQ ===
The headquarters of Bankura II CD block are located at Village Bikna in PO Kesiakole.

== Demographics ==
According to the 2011 Census of India, Bikna had a total population of 3,876 of which 1,961 (51%) were males and 1915 (49%) were females. Population below 6 years was 450. The total number of literates in Bikna was 2,565 (74.87% of the population over 6 years).

== Education ==
Manohari Devi Bajia DAV Public School is an English-medium coeducational higher secondary school following CBSE syllabus, established in 2001.

Bikna K.P.S. Vidyapith is a Bengali-medium coeducational institution established in 1964. It has facilities for teaching from class V to class XII. The school has 20 computers, a library with 3,000 books and a playground.

== Transport ==
State Highway 9, running from Durgapur (in Paschim Bardhaman district) to Nayagram (in Jhargram district), passes through Bikna.

Bikna railway station is on the Bankura–Masagram line under the Adra railway division.

== Healthcare ==
Kanchanpur Block Primary Health Centre, with 15 beds at Kanchanpur, is the major government medical facility in the Bankura II CD block. There are primary health centres at Narrah (with 4 beds) and Mankanali (with 10 beds).

== Dhokra at Bikna ==
There is a small community living in Bikna who are involved in making dhokra handicrafts. Thirty-six related families live in this close-knit clan community. Their forefathers came from Chhotanagpur and are believed to have been nomads but now they are firmly settled here and have even adopted a Sanskritised surname ‘Karmakar’, which is close, in its meaning to the English surname ‘Smith’. They follow the cire purdue or lost wax process for making small metallic decorative items. They have been facing problems where their traditional furnaces for melting the metal was proving to be uneconomic and raising costs. An organization named NISTADS got involved in developing a new furnace for the Bikna artisans. The clash of modernity and traditions had its own problems. However, the modern furnace has found acceptance at both Bikna and Dwaraipur, some two hours by road, in Purba Bardhaman district, another place where around 20 families are involved in the dhokra craft.

A global market emerged in the United States and Europe for the dhokra products. The artefacts display a uniqueness of a rustic and primitive appearance with the original tribal flavour.
