= Saltora (community development block) =

- Community development block
- Interactive map of Saltora
- Coordinates: 23.5333°N 86.9333°E
- Country: India
- State: West Bengal
- District: Bankura

Government
  - Type: Representative democracy

Area
  - Total: 312.62 km^{2} (120.70 sq mi)
- Elevation: 128 m (420 ft)

Population (2011)
  - Total: 135,980
  - Density: 434.97/km^{2} (1,126.6/sq mi)

Languages
  - Official: Bengali, Santali, English
- Time zone: UTC+5:30 (IST)
- PIN: 722 158 (Saltora); 722 153 (Tiluri)
- Telephone/STD code: 03241
- ISO 3166 code: IN-WB
- Vehicle registration: WB-67, WB-68
- Literacy: 61.45%
- Lok Sabha constituency: Bankura
- Vidhan Sabha constituency: Saltora
- Website: bankura.gov.in

Saltora is a community development block (CD block) that forms an administrative division in the Bankura Sadar subdivision of the Bankura district in the Indian state of West Bengal. Block Development officer Name - Mr.Manas Kumar Giri

== History ==
=== From Bishnupur kingdom to the British Raj ===
From around the 7th century AD till around the advent of British rule, for around a millennium, history of Bankura district is identical with the rise and fall of the Hindu Rajas of Bishnupur. The Bishnupur Rajas who were at the summit of their fortunes towards the end of the 17th century, started declining in the first half of the 18th century. First, the Maharaja of Burdwan seized the Fatehpur Mahal, and then the Bargi invasions laid waste their country.

Bishnupur was ceded to the British with the rest of Burdwan chakla in 1760. In 1787, Bishnupur was united with Birbhum to form a separate administrative unit. In 1793 it was transferred to the Burdwan collectorate. In 1879, the district acquired its present shape with the thanas of Khatra and Raipur and the outpost of Simplapal being transferred from Manbhum, and the thanas of Sonamukhi, Kotulpur and Indas being retransferred from Burdwan. However, it was known for sometime as West Burdwan and in 1881 came to be known as Bankura district.

== Geography ==
Map of Bankura District showing CD blocks and municipalities

Saltora is located at 23.5333°N 86.9333°E. It has an average elevation of 153 metres (505 feet.

Saltora CD block is located in the north-western part of the district. The Main Bankura Upland, of which Saltora CD block is a part, is characterised by undulating terrain with many hills and ridges. The area is having a gradual descent from the Chota Nagpur Plateau. There are coal mines in Saltora, Mejia and Barjora. The soil is laterite red and hard beds are covered with scrub jungle and sal wood.

There are two are two moderately high hills – Biharinath (in Saltora CD block) and Susunia (in Chhatna CD block). While the former rises to a height of 448 metres (1,470 ft), the latter attains a height of 440 metres (1,440 ft).

Saltora CD block is bounded by Salanpur and Barabani CD blocks, in Paschim Bardhaman district, across the Damodar, on the north, Mejia and Gangajaghati CD blocks, on the east, Chhatna CD block, on the south and Santuri CD block, in Purulia district, on the west.

Saltora CD block has an area of 312.62 km^{2}. It has 1 panchayat samity, 8 gram panchayats, 103 gram sansads (village councils), 157 mouzas and 145 inhabited villages. Saltora police station serves this block. Headquarters of this CD block is at Saltora.

Gram panchayats of Saltora block/ panchayat samiti are: Bamuntore, Dhekia, Gogra, Kunuri, Pabra, Salma, Saltora and Tiluri.

== Demographics ==
=== Population ===
According to the 2011 Census of India Saltora CD Block had a total population of 135,980, all of which were rural. There were 69,732 (51%) males and 66,248 (49%) females. Population in the age range of 0 to 6 years was 17,431. Scheduled Castes numbered 46,497 (34.19%) and Scheduled Tribes numbered 25,696 (18.90%).

In the 2001 census, Saltora community development bloc had a total population of 121,810 of which 62,357 were males and 59,453 were females. Decadal growth for the period 1991-2001 was 9.81% for Saltora, against 13.79% in Bankura growth in West Bengal was 17.84%.

Large villages (with 4,000+ population) in Saltora CD Block are (2011 census figures in brackets): Shirpurna (4,080), Tiluri (5,174) and Pabra (4,179).

Other villages in Saltora CD Block are (2011 census figures in brackets): Saltora (3,966), Salma (3,732), Bamantor (1,877), Dhekia (1,473), Kanuri (2,187) and Gogra (1,991).

=== Literacy ===
According to the 2011 census the total number of literates in Saltora CD Block was 72,854 (61.45% of the population over 6 years) out of which males numbered 44,846 (73.83% of the male population over 6 years) and females numbered 28,008 (48.45%) of the female population over 6 years). The gender disparity (the difference between female and male literacy rates) was 25.38%.

See also – List of West Bengal districts ranked by literacy rate

Literacy in CD blocks of
Bankura district
Bankura Sadar subdivision
Saltora – 61.45%
Mejia – 66.83%
Gangajalghati – 68.11%
Chhatna – 65.73%
Bankura I – 68.74%
Bankura II – 73.59%
Barjora – 71.67%
Onda – 65.82%
Bishnupur subdivision
Indas – 71.70%
Joypur – 74.57%
Patrasayer – 64.8%
Kotulpur – 78.01%
Sonamukhi – 66.16%
Bishnupur – 66.30%
Khatra subdivision
Indpur – 67.42%
Ranibandh – 68.53%
Khatra – 72.18%
Hirbandh – 64.18%
Raipur – 71.33%
Sarenga – 74.25%
Simlapal – 68.44%
Taldangra – 70.87%
2011 Census: CD Block Wise

Primary Census Abstract Data

=== Language and religion ===
Religion in Saltora CD block (2011)
Hinduism	84.51%
Other (tribal religion)	12.72%
Islam	2.00%
Jainism	0.58%
Other or not stated	0.19%

In the 2011 census Hindus numbered 114,904 (84.51%) in Saltora CD Block. Others were 17,293 (12.72%), Muslims 2,713 (2.00%) and Jains 794 (0.58%). Others numbered 3,201 and formed 2.35% of the population. Others include Addi Bassi, Marang Boro, Santal, Saranath, Sari Dharma, Sarna, Alchchi, Bidin, Sant, Saevdharm, Seran, Saran, Sarin, Kheria, and other religious communities. In 2001, Hindus were 99,022 (81.46%), others 18,441 (15.17%), Muslims 2422 (1.99%) and 1,589 (1.31%) Jains.

Languages of Saltora CD block (2011)
1. Bengali (81.2%)
2. Santali (16.5%)
3. Hindi (1.05%)
4. Others (1.25%)

At the time of the 2011 census, 81.23% of the population spoke Bengali, 16.47% Santali and 1.05% Hindi as their first language. Koda is another language spoken here.

== Rural poverty ==
In Saltora CD block 34.82% families were living below poverty line in 2007. According to the Rural Household Survey in 2005, 28.87% of the total number of families were BPL families in the Bankura district.

Migration has been observed in the following CD Blocks of Bankura district: Bankura I, Chhatna, Saltora, Indpur, Ranibandh, Hirbandh, Khatra, Raipur and Sarenga. Although authentic figures are not available, a sample survey has been done. According to the sample survey, around 54.5% to 85.4% of the families on an average migrate from these blocks. Another study shows that around 23% of the people from the under-privileged blocks in the western and southern Bankura migrate. Those migrating belong mostly to the SC or ST population. They migrate for periods varying from 15 days to 6/8 months. Most people migrate to meet their food deficit and go to Bardhaman and Hooghly districts but some go to Gujarat and Maharashtra as construction labour.

== Economy ==
=== Livelihood ===
Livelihood
in Saltora CD block
1. Cultivators (24.1%)
2. Agricultural labourers (35.4%)
3. Household industries (3.25%)
4. Other Workers (37.2%)

In the Saltora CD block in 2011, among the class of total workers, cultivators numbered 13,099 and formed 24.11%, agricultural labourers numbered 19,252 and formed 35.43%, household industry workers numbered 1,766 and formed 3.25% and other workers numbered 20,218 and formed 37.21%. Total workers numbered 54,335 and formed 39.96% of the total population, and non-workers numbered 81,645 and formed 60.04% of the population.

Note: In the census records a person is considered a cultivator, if the person is engaged in cultivation/ supervision of land owned by self/government/institution. When a person who works on another person's land for wages in cash or kind or share, is regarded as an agricultural labourer. Household industry is defined as an industry conducted by one or more members of the family within the household or village, and one that does not qualify for registration as a factory under the Factories Act. Other workers are persons engaged in some economic activity other than cultivators, agricultural labourers and household workers. It includes factory, mining, plantation, transport and office workers, those engaged in business and commerce, teachers, entertainment artistes and so on.

=== Infrastructure ===
There are 145 inhabited villages in the Saltora CD block, as per the District Census Handbook, Bankura, 2011. 100% villages have power supply. 100% villages have drinking water supply. 18 villages (12.41%) have post offices. 121 villages (83.45%) have telephones (including landlines, public call offices and mobile phones). 40 villages (27.59%) have pucca (paved) approach roads and 55 villages (37.93%) have transport communication (includes bus service, rail facility and navigable waterways). 7 villages (4.83%) have banks.

=== Agriculture ===
There were 77 fertiliser depots, 15 seed stores and 55 fair price shops in the CD block.

In 2013-14, persons engaged in agriculture in Saltora CD block could be classified as follows: bargadars 7.27%, patta (document) holders 17.35%, small farmers (possessing land between 1 and 2 hectares) 6.54%, marginal farmers (possessing land up to 1 hectare) 18.09% and agricultural labourers 50.76%.

In 2003-04 net area sown in Saltora CD block was 17,235 hectares and the area in which more than one crop was grown was 809 hectares.

In 2013-14, the total area irrigated in Saltora CD block was 3,300 hectares, out of which 2,400 hectares by tank water, 560 hectares by river lift irrigation, 90 hectares by open dug wells and 250 hectares by other methods.

In 2013-14, Saltora CD block produced 3,771 tonnes of Aman paddy, the main winter crop, from 2,006 hectares and 25 tonnes of wheat from 10 hectares It also produced pulses and mustard.

=== Handloom and pottery industries ===
The handloom industry engages the largest number of persons in the non farm sector and hence is important in Bankura district. The handloom industry is well established in all the CD blocks of the district and includes the famous Baluchari saris. In 2004-05 Saltora CD block had 127 looms in operation.

Bankura district is famous for the artistic excellence of its pottery products that include the famous Bankura horse. The range of pottery products is categorised as follows: domestic utilities, terracota and other decorative items and roofing tiles and other heavy pottery items. Around 3,200 families were involved in pottery making in the district in 2002. 190 families were involved in Saltora CD Block.

=== Banking ===
In 2013-14, Saltora CD block had offices of 6 commercial banks and 1 gramin banks.

=== Backward Regions Grant Fund ===
The Bankura district is listed as a backward region and receives financial support from the Backward Regions Grant Fund. The fund, created by the Government of India, is designed to redress regional imbalances in development. As of 2012, 272 districts across the country were listed under this scheme. The list includes 11 districts of West Bengal.

== Transport ==
In 2013-14, Saltora CD Block had 4 ferry services and 6 originating/ terminating bus routes. The nearest railway station is 15 km from the CD Block headquarters.

The Raghunathpur-Saltora and Saltora-Bankura sections of State Highway 8 (West Bengal) running from Santaldih (in Purulia district) to Majhdia (in Nadia district) passes through this CD Block.

== Education ==
Saltora has three colleges. - 1. Saltora Netaji Centenary College, 2. Saltora B.Ed.College, 3. D.El.Ed.College (Saltora Elementary Teacher Educational Programme Institute)

In 2013-14, Saltora CD Block had 122 primary schools with 13,388 students, 16 middle schools with 1,692 students, 8 high schools with 6,460 students and 7 higher secondary schools with 5,111 students. Saltora CD Block had 1 general college with 1,532 students, 1 technical and professional institution with 100 students, 288 institutions for special and non-formal education with 7,097 students. Saltora CD Block had 8 mass literacy centres. The only Govt School in this block is Govt Model School, Saltora, Located at vill Pabaya. It is a co-ed Eng medium School from class V-XII(WBBSE)

See also – Education in India

According to the 2011 census, in the Saltora CD block, among the 145 inhabited villages, 26 villages did not have a school, 35 villages had two or more primary schools, 33 villages had at least 1 primary and 1 middle school and 15 villages had at least 1 middle and 1 secondary school.

== Culture ==
There is an old temple at the foot of Biharinath hill. With the discovery of Paleolithic tools in the Biharinath area, the hill and the surrounding areas have come into focus of archaeologists.

== Healthcare ==
In 2014, Saltora CD Block had 1 rural hospital, 3 primary health centres and 1 private nursing home with total 61 beds and 6 doctors. It had 23 family welfare sub centres and 1 family welfare centre. 5,255 patients were treated indoor and 142,080 patients were treated outdoor in the hospitals, health centres and subcentres of the CD Block.

Saltora Rural Hospital, with 30 beds at Saltora, is the major government medical facility in the Saltora CD block. There are primary health centres at Gogra (with 10 beds), Ituri (Tiluri) (with 10 beds) and Kashtora (with 6 beds).
