= Agaya =

- village
- Location in West Bengal, India Agaya (India)
- Coordinates: 23°11′47″N 87°02′36″E
- Country: India
- State: West Bengal
- District: Bankura

Government
  - Type: Panchayati raj (India)
  - Body: Gram panchayat

Languages
  - Official: Bengali, English
- Time zone: UTC+5:30 (IST)
- ISO 3166 code: IN-WB
- Vehicle registration: WB-

Agaya is a village in Bankura I Sub District in Bankura district, West Bengal, India.

== Demographics ==
According to 2011 census of India, the village has a population of 912;

- Male= 461
- Female= 451
