= Amlatara =

- Village
- Location in West Bengal, India
- Coordinates: 22°24′04″N 88°03′17″E
- Country: India
- State: West Bengal
- District: Bankura

Government
  - Type: Panchayati raj (India)
  - Body: Gram panchayat

Languages
  - Official: Bengali, English
- Time zone: UTC+5:30 (IST)
- ISO 3166 code: IN-WB
- Vehicle registration: WB-

Amlatara is a village in Bankura I Sub District in Bankura district, West Bengal, India.

== Demographics ==
According to '2011 census of India', the village has a population of 863;

- Males=457
- Females= 406
