= Bolara =

- Village
- Location in West Bengal, India Bolara (India)
- Coordinates: 23°14′21.2″N 87°01′09.4″E
- Country: India
- State: West Bengal
- District: Bankura

Government
  - Type: Panchayati raj (India)
  - Body: Gram panchayat

Languages
  - Official: Bengali, English
- Time zone: UTC+5:30 (IST)
- ISO 3166 code: IN-WB
- Vehicle registration: WB-

Bolara is a small village in Bankura I CD Block in Bankura district, West Bengal, India (population 850). Shideswar temple is a famous temple and its fall under ASI.
