= Mejia, Bankura =

Mejia
- Village
- Location in West Bengal, India Mejia (India)
- Coordinates: 23°34′12.0″N 87°06′00.0″E
- Country: India
- State: West Bengal
- District: Bankura

Population (2011)
  - Total: 5,308

Languages
  - Official: Bengali, English
- Time zone: UTC+5:30 (IST)
- PIN: 722143 (Mejia)
- Telephone/STD code: 03241
- Lok Sabha constituency: Bankura
- Vidhan Sabha constituency: Saltora
- Website: bankura.gov.in

Mejia is a village in Mejia CD block in the Bankura Sadar subdivision of the Bankura district in the state of West Bengal, India.

== Geography ==
Places in Bankura Sadar subdivision in Bankura district
M: municipal town/ city, CT: census town, R: rural/ urban centre, H: hill centre, T: temple/ religious centre, B: barrage
Owing to space constraints in the small map, the actual locations in a larger map may vary slightly

=== Location ===
Mejia is located at 23°34′12.0″N 87°06′00.0″E.

=== Area overview ===
The map alongside shows the Bankura Sadar subdivision of Bankura district. Physiographically, this area is part of the Bankura Uplands in the west gradually merging with the Bankura-Bishnupur Rarh Plains in the north-east. The western portions are characterised by undulating terrain with many hills and ridges. The area is having a gradual descent from the Chota Nagpur Plateau. The soil is laterite red and hard beds are covered with scrub jungle and sal wood. Gradually it gives way to just uneven rolling lands but the soil continues to be lateritic. There are coal mines in the northern part, along the Damodar River. It is a predominantly rural area with 89% of the population living in rural areas and only 11% living in the urban areas.

Note: The map alongside presents some of the notable locations in the subdivision. All places marked in the map are linked in the larger full screen map.

== Demographics ==
According to the 2011 Census of India, Mejia had a total population of 5,308 of which 2,772 (52%) were males and 2,536 (48%) were females. Population below 6 years was 620. The total number of literates in Mejia was 3,592 (76.62% of the population over 6 years).

== Civic administration ==
=== CD block HQ ===
The headquarters of Mejia CD block are located at Mejia.

=== Police station ===
Mejia police station has jurisdiction over Mejia CD block. The area covered is 162.90 km^{2} and the population covered is 76,123.

== Economy ==
=== Industries ===
Sova Ispat Limited, at Mejia, produces sponge iron, rolled products, ferro alloys and pig iron and has a captive power plant. It employs 5,000 people. Ma Amba Sponge Iron Pvt. Ltd. employs 250 people.

== Transport ==
National Highway 14, (old numbering NH 60), running from Morgram to Kharagpur, passes through Mejia. Raniganj railway station is located nearby.

== Education ==
The Government General Degree College, now renamed Kabi Jagadram Government General Degree College, at Gopalpur village, PO Mejia, was established in 2015. It is offering honours courses in Bengali, English, economics, history, philosophy, geology, physics, mathematics and accountancy.

Mejia High School is a Bengali-medium coeducational school established in 1930. It has facilities for teaching from class V to class XII. The school has 10 computers, 2,500 books in the library and a playground.

Mejia Girls High School is a Bengali-medium girls only school established in 1968. It has facilities for teaching from class V to class XII. The school has 10 computers, 1,000 books in the library and a playground.

Sukanta Smriti VidyaMandir ( Higher Secondary) is a co-educational school established in 1999, offering classes from V to XII for both boys and girls. The school is equipped with two grounds - one within the school boundary and the other located at the back of the school. More

== Healthcare ==
Mejia Block Primary Health Centre, with 25 beds at Mejia, is the major government medical facility in Mejia CD block. There are primary health centres at Ramchandrapur (with 4 beds) and Pairasol (with 10 beds).
