= Chandana Bauri =

Indian politician

Member of the West Bengal Legislative Assembly
- Incumbent
- Assumed office 2 May 2021
- Preceded by: Swapan Bouri
- Constituency: Saltora

Personal details
- Born: 1990 or 1991 (age 34–35)
- Party: Bharatiya Janata Party
- Spouse: Sraban Bauri
- Profession: Politician

Chandana Bauri is an Indian politician from Bharatiya Janata Party. In May 2021, she was elected as the member of the West Bengal Legislative Assembly from Saltora (constituency). She defeated Santosh Kumar Mondal of All India Trinamool Congress by 4,145 votes in 2021 West Bengal Assembly election.
