= Biharinath =

Tallest hill in Bankura District, West Bengal

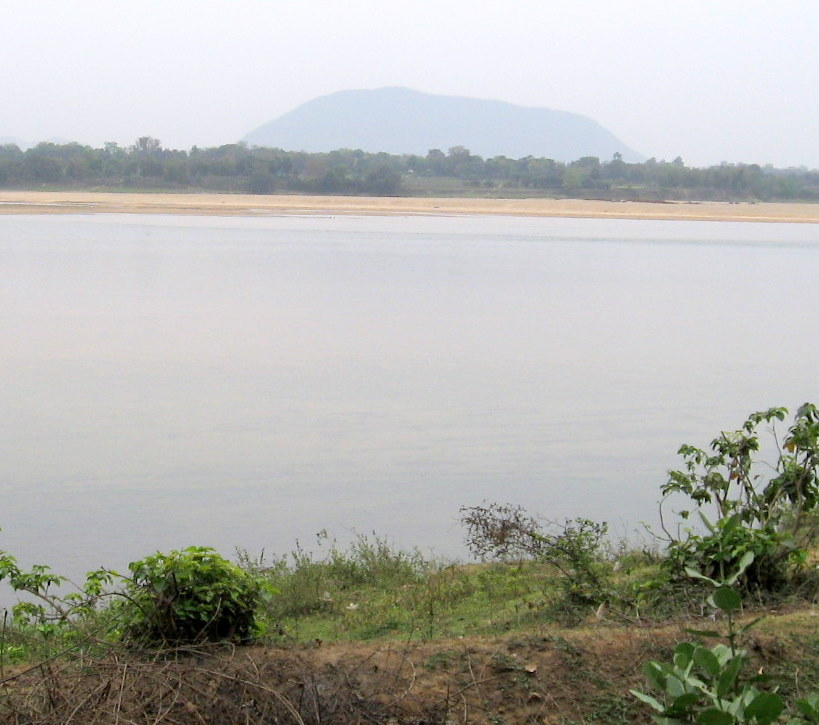
- Biharinath from Nehru Park, Burnpur across the Damodar River

Highest point
- Elevation: 451 m (1,480 ft)
- Coordinates: 23°34′29.65″N 86°55′57.68″E

Geography
- Places in Bankura Sadar subdivision in Bankura district. Key: M: municipal town/ city, C: census town, R: rural/ urban centre, H: hill centre, T: temple/ religious centre, B: barrage Mouse over or touch press for feature details. Owing to space constraints in the small map, the locations in the larger map on click through may vary slightly
- Location: Saltora, Bankura district, West Bengal, India
- Parent range: Chota Nagpur Plateau

Biharinath is the tallest hill of Bankura District, in the Indian state of West Bengal., and one of the dense forest areas of the district. It is a part of the Eastern Ghats. It is 451 metres (1,480 ft) high. It is situated about 60 kilometres (37 mi) north-west of Bankura town and 8 kilometres (5 mi) north-east of Saltora village in Saltora block.

== Geography ==
=== Location ===
Biharinath is located at 23°34′29.65″N 86°55′57.68″E.

=== Area overview ===
The map alongside shows the Bankura Sadar subdivision of Bankura district. Geographically, this area is part of the Bankura Uplands in the west gradually merging with the Bankura-Bishnupur Rarh Plains in the north-east. The western portions are characterised by undulating terrain with many hills and ridges. The area has a gradual descent from the Chota Nagpur Plateau. The soil is laterite red and hard beds are covered with scrub jungle and sal wood. Gradually it gives way to just uneven rolling lands but the soil continues to be lateritic. There are coal mines in the northern part, along the Damodar River. It is a predominantly rural area with 89% of the population living in rural areas and only 11% living in the urban areas.

== Archaeological importance ==
With the discovery of Paleolithic tools in the Biharinath area, the hill and the surrounding areas have come into focus of archaeologists.

== Tourism ==
The base of Biharinath hill is a popular tourist spot. A small lake measuring 0.5 ha (1.2 acres) provides facilities for angling. There is an old Shiva temple of Biharinath nearby.

Biharinath offers pollution-free green surroundings where water is a panacea. This place has hills, dense forests with abundant flora and fauna, spring, water bodies, Damodar River, and a renowned Shiva temple. Susunia hill, Joychandi Pahar, Garh Panchkot, Baranti, Panchet Dam, and Maithon Dam are all located at short distances. Government of West Bengal has already taken a 150 crore mega tourism project for Biharinath.

== Economy ==
The area also has coal deposits. Biharinath block represents south central part of Raniganj Coalfield in Trans Damodar region. The entire area is covered with alluvial soil. Employment for many was mostly dependent on the coal mines or immigration to the Asansol/Durgapur area to find a job. As tourism is flourishing at Biharinath opportunities in tourism are gradually expanding.
