= Nehru Park, Burnpur =

Nehru Park
- Park
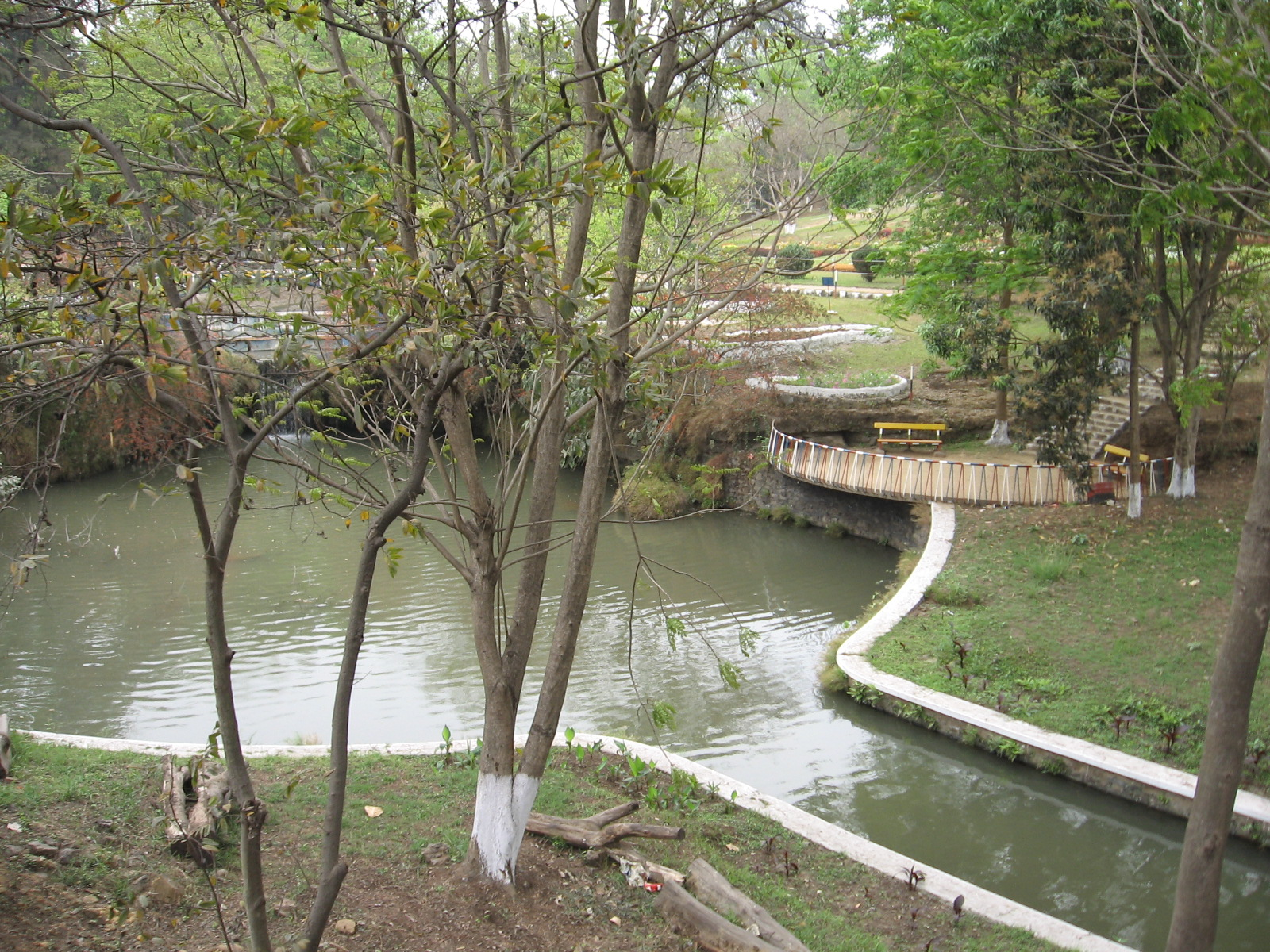
- A cosy nook in the park

- Location in West Bengal, India Nehru Park (India)
- Coordinates: 23.634°N 86.947°E
- Country: India
- State: West Bengal
- District: Paschim Bardhaman

Area
  - Total: 26 ha (64 acres)
- Elevation: 75 m (246 ft)

Languages
  - Official: Bengali, English
- Time zone: UTC+5:30 (IST)
- Vehicle registration: WB
- Nearest city: Asansol
- Location: North bank of Damodar River
- Precipitation: 1,300 millimetres (51 in)
- Avg. summer temperature: 40 °C (104 °F)
- Avg. winter temperature: 25 °C (77 °F)

Nehru Park is located on the banks of the Damodar River at Burnpur, a neighbourhood in Asansol in the Indian state of West Bengal.

== Name ==
The park was planned by F. W. A. Lahmeyer, general manager of the IISCO Steel Plant. Although officially named Riverside Park, it was nicknamed Lahmeyer Park. In 1989, the 100-year anniversary of the birth of India's first Prime Minister, Jawaharlal Nehru, the park was renamed Nehru Park. A cast iron statue of Nehru, cast at Kulti Works, then part of IISCO, was installed in the park.

== Images ==
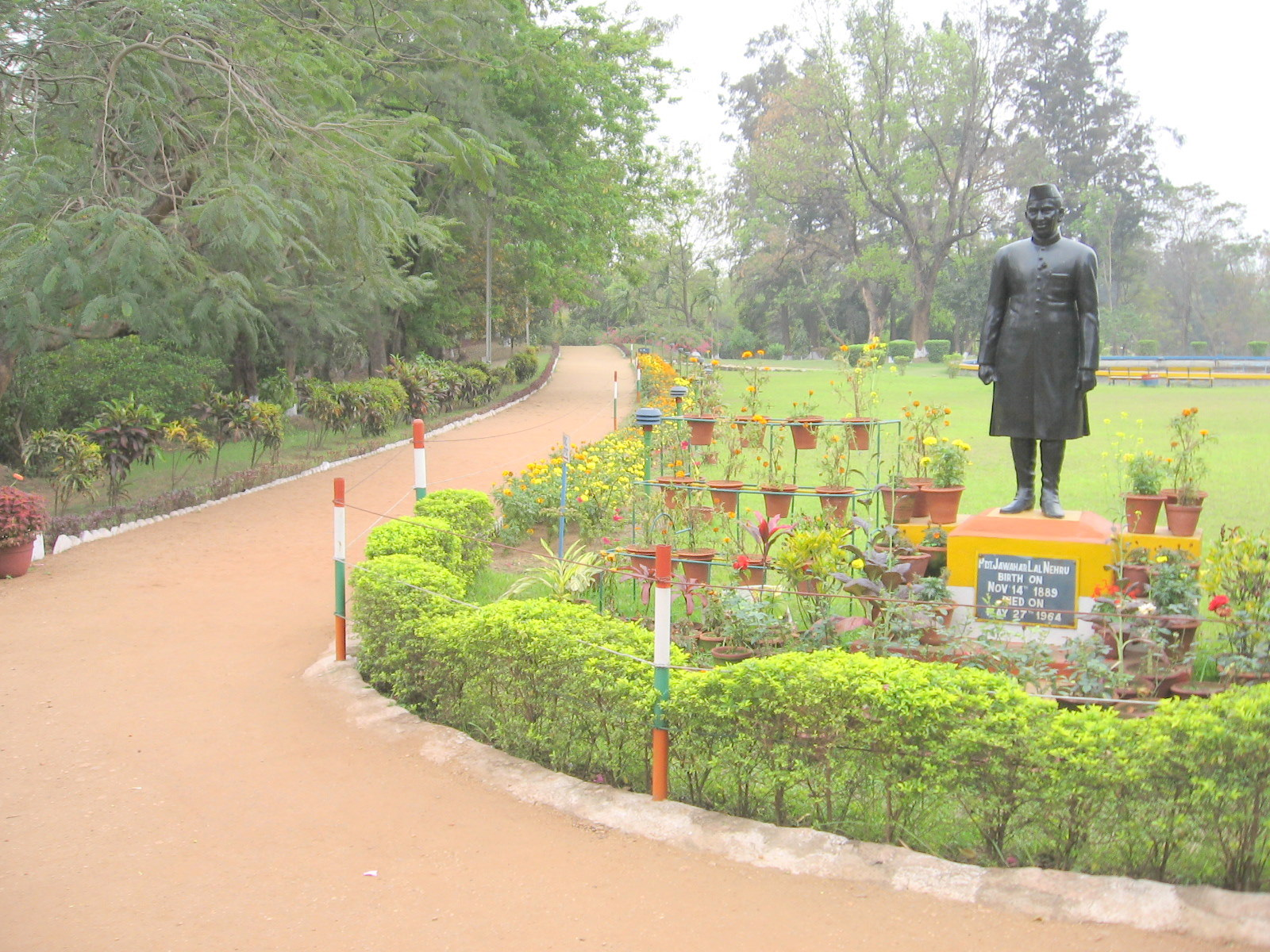
Statue of Jawaharlal Nehru, near the park entrance gate

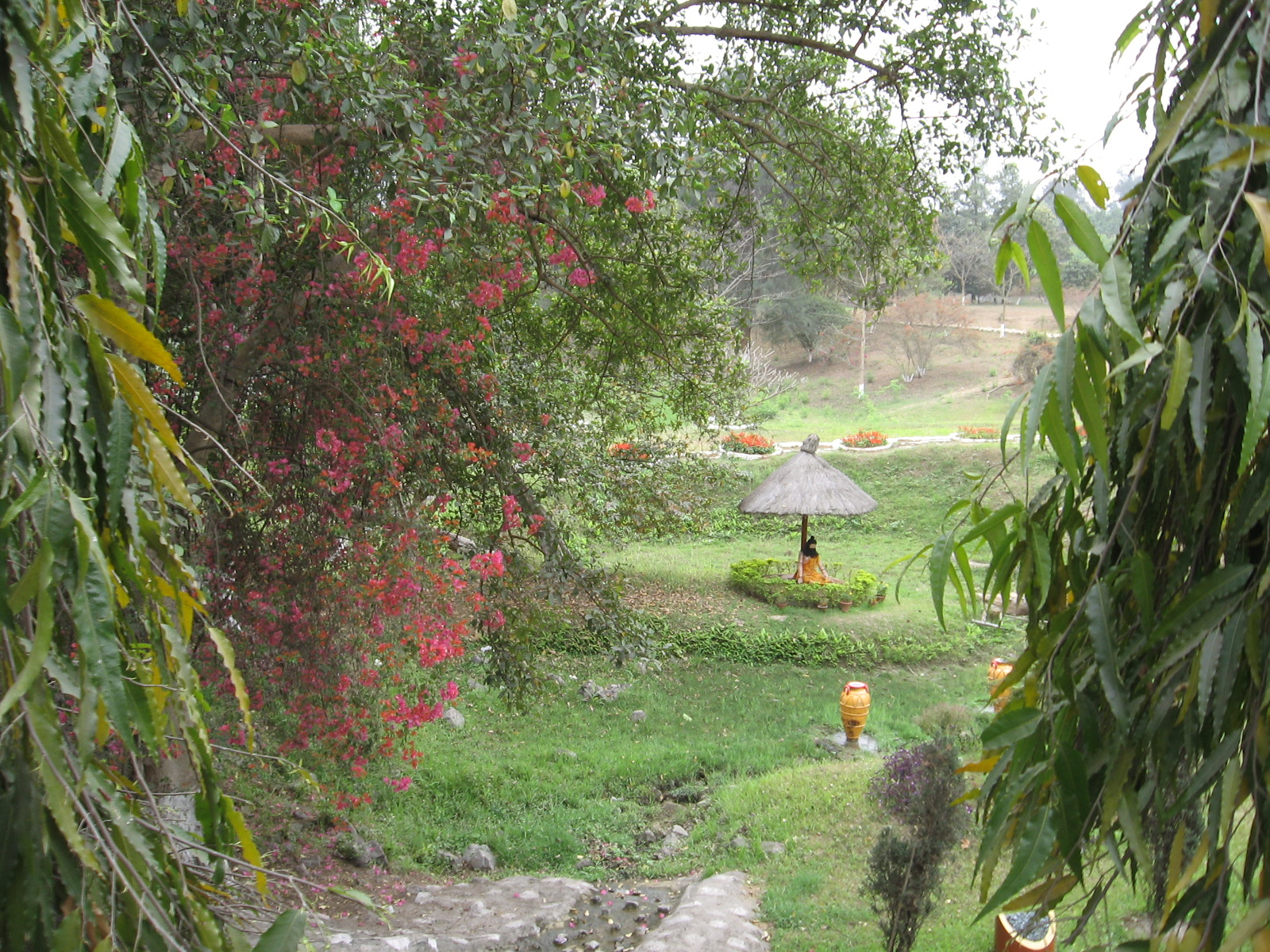
A section of the park

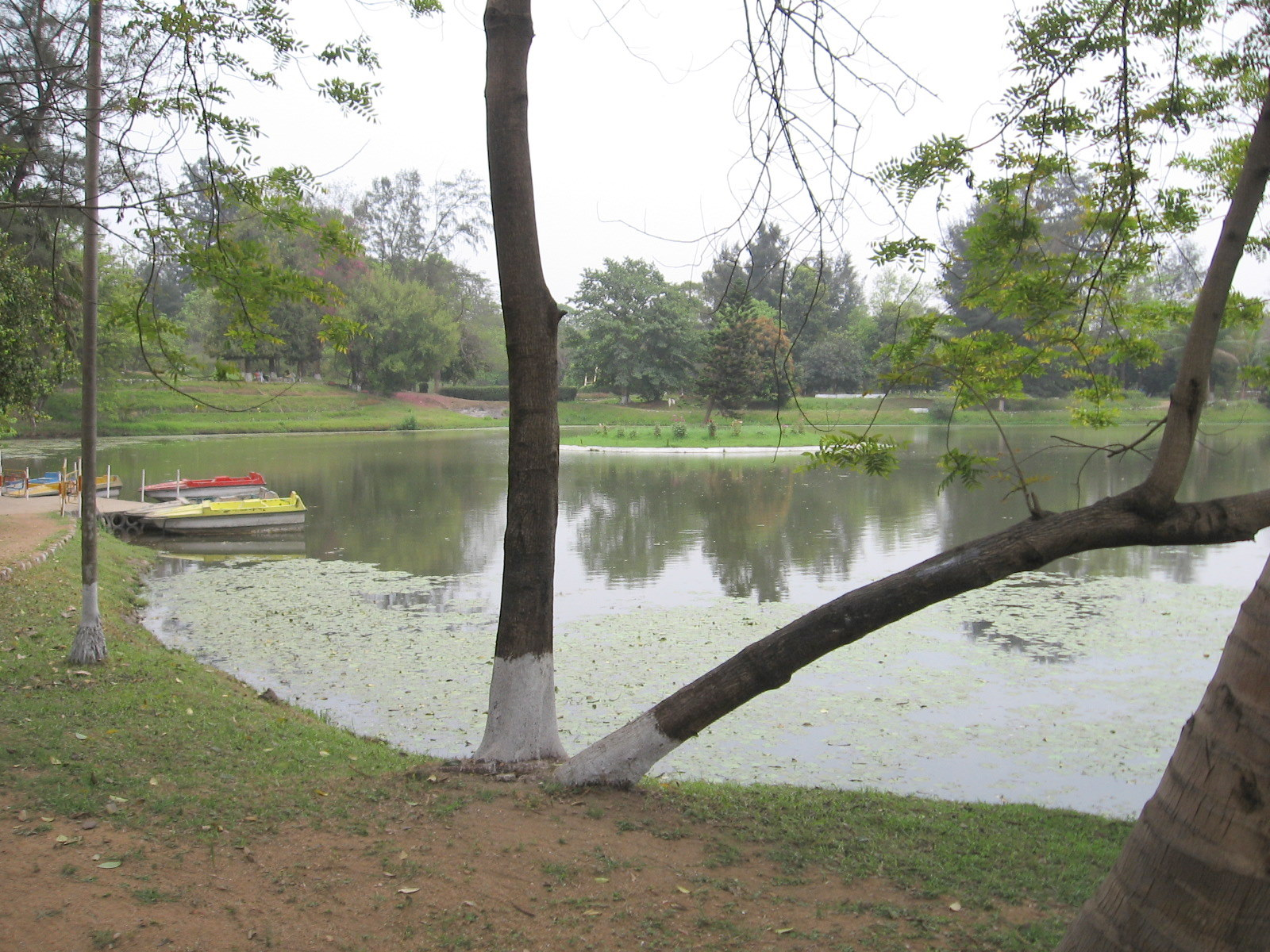
Lake with boating facilities in the park

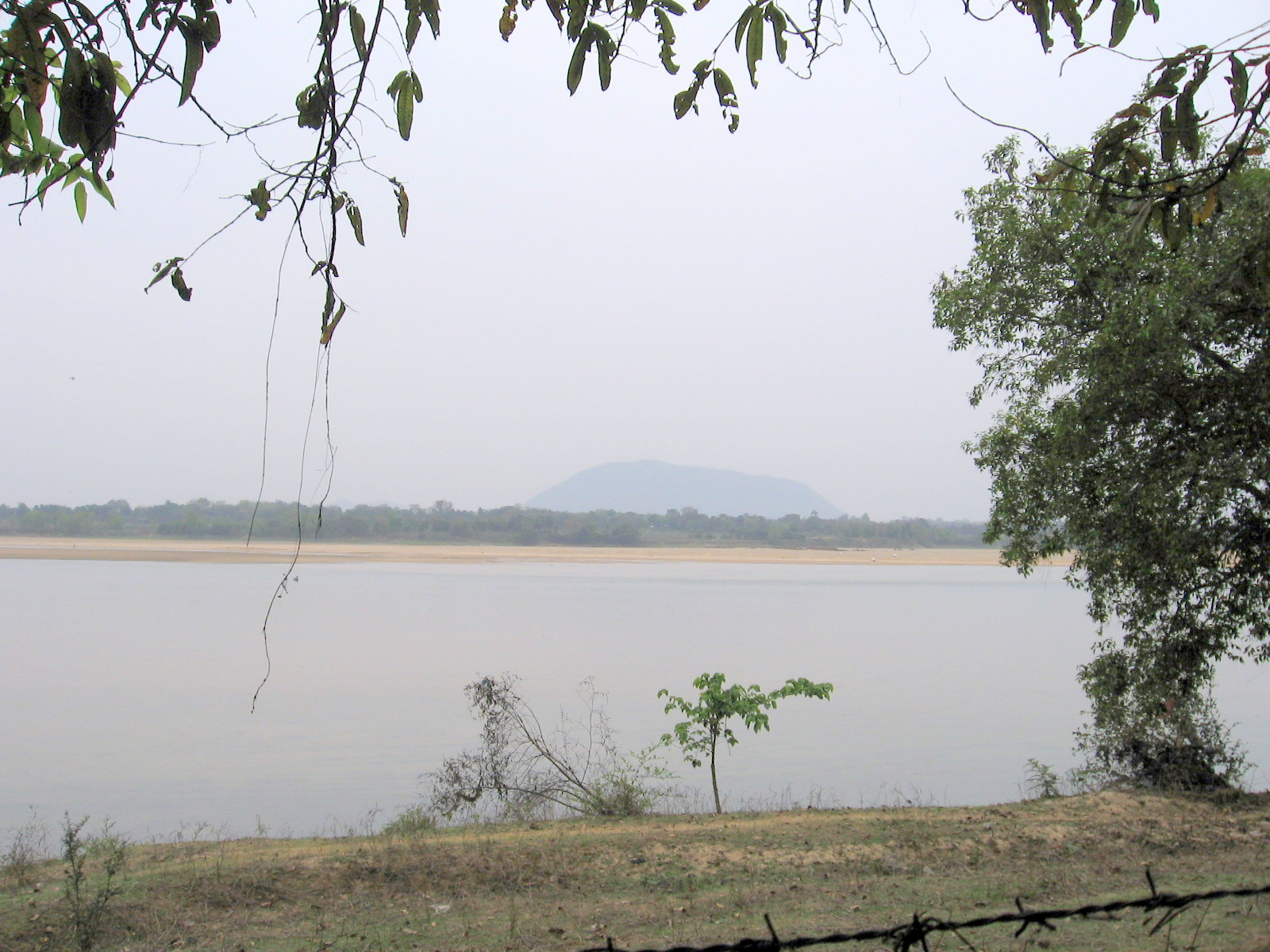
Biharinath, across the Damodar River, as seen from the park
