= Kanchanpur, Bankura =

Kanchanpur
- Village
- Location in West Bengal, India Kanchanpur (India)
- Coordinates: 23°18′51.1″N 87°05′38.4″E
- Country: India
- State: West Bengal
- District: Bankura

Population (2011)
  - Total: 3,206

Languages
  - Official: Bengali, English
- Time zone: UTC+5:30 (IST)
- Telephone/STD code: 03241
- Lok Sabha constituency: Bankura
- Vidhan Sabha constituency: Bankura
- Website: bankura.gov.in

Kanchanpur is a village in the Bankura II CD block in the Bankura Sadar subdivision of the Bankura district in the state of West Bengal, India.

== Geography ==
Places in Bankura Sadar subdivision in Bankura district
M: municipal town/ city, CT: census town, R: rural/ urban centre, H: hill centre, T: temple/ religious centre, B: barrage
Owing to space constraints in the small map, the actual locations in a larger map may vary slightly

=== Location ===
Kanchanpur is located at 23°18′51.1″N 87°05′38.4″E.

=== Area overview ===
The map alongside shows the Bankura Sadar subdivision of Bankura district. Physiographically, this area is part of the Bankura Uplands in the west gradually merging with the Bankura-Bishnupur Rarh Plains in the north-east. The western portions are characterised by undulating terrain with many hills and ridges. The area is having a gradual descent from the Chota Nagpur Plateau. The soil is laterite red and hard beds are covered with scrub jungle and sal wood. Gradually it gives way to just uneven rolling lands but the soil continues to be lateritic. There are coal mines in the northern part, along the Damodar River. It is a predominantly rural area with 89% of the population living in rural areas and only 11% living in the urban areas.

Note: The map alongside presents some of the notable locations in the subdivision. All places marked in the map are linked in the larger full screen map.

== Demographics ==
According to the 2011 Census of India, Kanchanpur had a total population of 3,206 of which 1,616 (50%) were males and 1,590 (50%) were females. Population below 6 years was 378. The total number of literates in Kanchanpur was 1,954 (74.66% of the population over 6 years).

== Transport ==
National Highway 14, (old numbering NH 60), running from Morgram to Kharagpur, passes through Kanchanpur.

== Education ==
Kanchanpur High School is a Bengali-medium coeducational institution established in 1970. It has facilities for teaching from class V to class X. The school has 1 computer, a library with 130 books and a playground.

== Healthcare ==
Kanchanpur Block Primary Health Centre, with 15 beds at Kanchanpur, is the major government medical facility in the Bankura II CD block. There are primary health centres at Narrah (with 4 beds) and Mankanali (with 10 beds).
