= Partha De =

Indian politician

Minister of School Education, Govt. of W.B
- In office 2006 - 2011
- Preceded by: Kanti Biswas
- Succeeded by: Partha Chatterjee

Minister of Health, Govt. of W.B
- In office 1992-2001

Member of Legislative Assembly
- In office 1977 - 1982; 1987 - 2001; 2006 - 2011
- Preceded by: Kashinath Mishra
- Succeeded by: Kashinath Mishra
- Constituency: Bankura
- In office 1996 - 2006

Personal details
- Born: 1 January 1940 (age 86) Bankura district, Bengal Presidency, British India
- Party: Communist Party of India (Marxist)
- Occupation: Politician

Partha De (born 1940) is an Indian politician and a member of the Communist Party of India (Marxist). He has served as the School Education Minister and Health Minister in the Government of West Bengal.

== Political career ==
Partha De has represented Bankura Vidhan Sabha constituency as a Member of the Legislative Assembly of West Bengal for 5 terms, that is 25 years. He won in 1977, 1987, 1991, 1996 and 2006. He was a runner up in 1982 and 2001. In 2011, he decided to not contest in polls. He had served as the School Education Minister between 2006 and 2011 as a part of the Third Bhattacharjee ministry. He had also served as the health minister.
