= Department of School Education (West Bengal) =

State government department in West Bengal, India

Department overview
- Jurisdiction: Government of West Bengal
- Headquarters: Bikash Bhavan, 5th Floor, Salt Lake, Kolkata -700091
- Minister responsible: Dipak Barman, Cabinet Minister
- Deputy Minister responsible: Koushik Chowdhury, MoS
- Department executive: Binod Kumar, I.A.S,, Principal Secretary
- Parent department: Government of West Bengal
- Website: banglarshiksha.wb.gov.in

Department of School Education is the department of school education including primary and secondary schools in the state of West Bengal, India. This is the main authority to implement the educational policy of the Government of West Bengal.

== Activities ==
The department is the nodal body which look after various aspects of school level educations for the state having specific tasks like text book selection, formation of board and councils (West Bengal Board of Secondary Education and West Bengal Council of Higher Secondary Education), inspection, recruitment of teachers (Government)/ education staff, execution of projects, language policy and schemes, preparation of teaching, training, research etc. There are also have the regular budgeting, audit programs, recognition, up-gradation of schools and legal matters.

== Directorates ==
- Directorate of School Education
- Directorate of Accounts (DOA)

== Parastatals Agencies under the department ==
- Expert Committee of School Education
- Paschim Banga Samagra Shiksha Mission (State Project Office)
- Paschim Banga State Mid Day Meal Programme (State Project Office)
- West Bengal Council of Higher Secondary Education (WBCHSE)
- West Bengal Board of Secondary Education (WBBSE)
- West Bengal Board of Primary Education (WBBPE)
- West Bengal Central School Service Commission (WBCSSC)
- West Bengal Council of Rabindra Open Schooling (WBCROS)
- State Council of Educational Research & Training (SCERT), West Bengal

== Ministers ==
The current Minister in charge is Dipak Barman due to New Govt. of West Bengal Formed on 09 May 2026.

| # | Portrait | Name | Entered Office | Left Office | Time in office |
|---|---|---|---|---|---|
| 1 | | Kanti Biswas | 1996 | 2006 | 9 – 10 years |
| 2 | | Partha De | 2006 | 2011 | 4 – 5 years |
| 3 | | Bratya Basu | 20 May 2011 | 20 May 2014 | 3 years |
| 4 | | Partha Chatterjee | 20 May 2014 | 10 May 2021 | 6 years, 355 days |
| 5 | | Bratya Basu | 10 May 2021 | 07 May 2026 | 4 years, 362 days |
| 6 | | Dipak Barman | 10 June 2026 | Incumbent | 59 days |
