= Achuri =

- Village
- Location in West Bengal, India Achuri (India)
- Coordinates: 23°16′34.0″N 86°59′52.1″E
- Country: India
- State: West Bengal
- District: Bankura

Government
  - Type: Panchayati Raj

Population (2011)
  - Total: 3,386

Languages
  - Official: Bengali, English
- Time zone: UTC+5:30 (IST)
- Telephone/STD code: 03241
- Lok Sabha constituency: Bankura
- Vidhan Sabha constituency: Bankura
- Website: bankura.gov.in

Achuri is a village in the Bankura I CD block in the Bankura Sadar subdivision of the Bankura district in the state of West Bengal, India

== Geography ==
Places in Bankura Sadar subdivision in Bankura district
M: municipal town/ city, CT: census town, R: rural/ urban centre, H: hill centre, T: temple/ religious centre, B: barrage
Owing to space constraints in the small map, the actual locations in a larger map may vary slightly

=== Location ===
Achuri is located at 23°16′34.0″N 86°59′52.1″E.

=== Area overview ===
The map alongside shows the Bankura Sadar subdivision of Bankura district. Physiographically, this area is part of the Bankura Uplands in the west gradually merging with the Bankura-Bishnupur Rarh Plains in the north-east. The western portions are characterised by undulating terrain with many hills and ridges. The area is having a gradual descent from the Chota Nagpur Plateau. The soil is laterite red and hard beds are covered with scrub jungle and sal wood. Gradually it gives way to just uneven rolling lands but the soil continues to be lateritic. There are coal mines in the northern part, along the Damodar River. It is a predominantly rural area with 89% of the population living in rural areas and only 11% living in the urban areas.

Note: The map alongside presents some of the notable locations in the subdivision. All places marked in the map are linked in the larger full screen map.

== Demographics ==
According to the 2011 Census of India, Achuri had a total population of 3,386 of which 1,728 (51%) were males and 1,658 (49%) were females. Population below 6 years was 406. The total number of literates in Achuri was 2,225 (74.66% of the population over 6 years).

== Transport ==
State Highway 8 running from Santaldih (in Purulia district) to Majhdia (in Nadia district) passes through Achuri.

Anchuri railway station is on the Kharagpur-Bankura-Adra line of South Eastern Railway.

== Education ==
NAM-Anchuri Madhyamik Vidyalaya is a Bengali-medium boys only institution established in 1959. It has facilities for teaching from class V to class X. The school has a library with 275 books and a playground.

NAM-Anchuri S.S. Girls High School is a Bengali-medium girls only institution established in 1968. It has facilities for teaching from class V to class X. The school has 5 computers and a library with 643 books.

Jyoti Pratibandhi Punarbasan Kendra, PO Gobinda Nagar, Kenduadihi, a specialized school for the hearing impaired, was established in 1994. It has facilities for teaching from class I to class VIII.

== Healthcare ==
Anchuri Rural Hospital, with 30 beds at Achuri, is the major government medical facility in the Bankura I CD block. There are primary health centres at Helna Susunia (with 10 beds) and Kanjakura (with 10 beds).
