= Mejia (community development block) =

- Community Development Block
- Interactive map of Mejia
- Coordinates: 23.57°N 87.10°E
- Country: India
- State: West Bengal
- District: Bankura

Government
  - Type: Representative democracy

Area
  - Total: 162.87 km^{2} (62.88 sq mi)
- Elevation: 92 m (302 ft)

Population (2011)
  - Total: 86,188
  - Density: 529.18/km^{2} (1,370.6/sq mi)

Languages
  - Official: Bengali, English
- Time zone: UTC+5:30 (IST)
- PIN: 722 143 (Mejhia)
- Telephone/STD code: 03241
- ISO 3166 code: IN-WB
- Vehicle registration: WB-67, WB-68
- Literacy: 66.83%
- Sex ratio: 926 ♂/♀
- Lok Sabha constituency: Bankura
- Vidhan Sabha constituency: Saltora
- Website: bankura.gov.in

Mejia (also spelled Mejhia) is a community development block (CD block) that forms an administrative division in the Bankura Sadar subdivision of the Bankura district in the Indian state of West Bengal.

== History ==
=== From Bishnupur kingdom to the British Raj ===
From around 7th century AD till around the advent of British rule, for around a millennium, history of Bankura district is identical with the rise and fall of the Hindu Rajas of Bishnupur. The Bishnupur Rajas, who were at the summit of their fortunes towards the end of the 17th century, started declining in the first half of the 18th century. First, the Maharaja of Burdwan seized the Fatehpur Mahal, and then the Maratha invasions laid waste their country.

Bishnupur was ceded to the British with the rest of Burdwan chakla in 1760. In 1787, Bishnupur was united with Birbhum to form a separate administrative unit. In 1793 it was transferred to the Burdwan collectorate. In 1879, the district acquired its present shape with the thanas of Khatra and Raipur and the outpost of Simplapal being transferred from Manbhum, and the thanas of Sonamukhi, Kotulpur and Indas being retransferred from Burdwan. However, it was known for sometime as West Burdwan and in 1881 came to be known as Bankura district.

== Geography ==
Map of Bankura District showing CD blocks and municipalities

Mejia is located at 23.57°N 87.10°E. It has an average elevation of 77 m (253 ft).

Mejia CD block is located in the north-western part of the district. The Main Bankura Upland, of which Mejia CD block is a part, is characterised by undulating terrain with many hills and ridges. The area is having a gradual descent from the Chota Nagpur Plateau. There are coal mines in Saltora, Mejia and Barjora. The soil is laterite red and hard beds are covered with scrub jungle and sal wood.

Mejia CD block is bounded by Raniganj and Andal CD blocks, in Paschim Bardhaman district, across the Damodar on the north, Barjora CD block on the east, Gangajalghati CD block on the south and Saltora CD block on the west.

Mejia CD block has an area of 162.87 km^{2}. It has 1 panchayat samity, 5 gram panchayats, 65 gram sansads (village councils), 75 mouzas and 72 inhabited villages. Mejia police station serves this block. Headquarters of this CD block is at Mejia.

Gram panchayats of Mejia block/ panchayat samiti are: Ardhagram, Banjora, Kustora, Mejia and Ramchandrapur.

== Demographics ==
=== Population ===
According to the 2011 Census of India Mejhia CD block had a total population of 86,188, all of which were rural. There were 44,575 (52%) males and 41,613 (48%) females. Population in the age range of 0 to 6 years was 11,002. Scheduled Castes numbered 29,956 (34.19%) and Scheduled Tribes numbered 2,114 (2.45%).

Large villages (with 4,000+ population) in Mejia CD block are (2011 census figures in brackets): Mejia (5,308) and Tarapur (4,611).

Other villages in Mejia CD block are (2011 census figures in brackets): Ramchandrapur (2,680), Banjora (1,529), Kustor (3,278) and Arddhagram (1,189).

=== Literacy ===
According to the 2011 census the total number of literates in Mejia CD block was 50,244 (66.83% of the population over 6 years) out of which males numbered 30,291 (77.88% of the male population over 6 years) and females numbered 19,953 (54.98%) of the female population over 6 years). The gender disparity (the difference between female and male literacy rates) was 22.89%.

See also – List of West Bengal districts ranked by literacy rate

Literacy in CD blocks of
Bankura district
Bankura Sadar subdivision
Saltora – 61.45%
Mejia – 66.83%
Gangajalghati – 68.11%
Chhatna – 65.73%
Bankura I – 68.74%
Bankura II – 73.59%
Barjora – 71.67%
Onda – 65.82%
Bishnupur subdivision
Indas – 71.70%
Joypur – 74.57%
Patrasayer – 64.8%
Kotulpur – 78.01%
Sonamukhi – 66.16%
Bishnupur – 66.30%
Khatra subdivision
Indpur – 67.42%
Ranibandh – 68.53%
Khatra – 72.18%
Hirbandh – 64.18%
Raipur – 71.33%
Sarenga – 74.25%
Simlapal – 68.44%
Taldangra – 70.87%
2011 Census: CD Block Wise

Primary Census Abstract Data

=== Language and religion ===
Religion in Mejia CD block (2011)
Hinduism	94.48%
Islam	3.43%
Other (tribal religion)	1.33%
Jainism	0.71%
Other or not stated	0.05%

In the 2011 census Hindus numbered 81,428 and formed 94.48% of the population in Mejia CD Block. Muslims numbered 2,953 and formed 3.43% of the population. Jains numbered 608 and formed 0.71% of the population. Others numbered 1,199 and formed 1.39% of the population. Others include Addi Bassi, Marang Boro, Santal, Saranath, Sari Dharma, Sarna, Alchchi, Bidin, Sant, Saevdharm, Seran, Saran, Sarin, Kheria, and other religious communities. In 2001, Hindus were 71,586 (94.04%), Muslims 2,857 (3.75%) and Jains 563 (0.74%). Other religions were 1,117 (1.47%).

Languages of Mejia CD block (2011)
1. Bengali (95.6%)
2. Santali (1.74%)
3. Khortha (1.41%)
4. Others (1.26%)

At the time of the 2011 census, 95.59% of the population spoke Bengali, 1.74% Santali and 1.41% Khortha as their first language.

== Rural poverty ==
In Mejia CD Block 45.75% families were living below poverty line in 2007. According to the Rural Household Survey in 2005, 28.87% of the total number of families were BPL families in the Bankura district.

== Economy ==
=== Livelihood ===
Livelihood
in Mejia CD block
1. Cultivators (18.6%)
2. Agricultural labourers (26.7%)
3. Household industries (2.27%)
4. Other Workers (52.4%)

In the Mejia CD block in 2011, among the class of total workers, cultivators numbered 5,659 and formed 18.59%, agricultural labourers numbered 19,252 and formed 26.70%, household industry workers numbered 690 and formed 2.27% and other workers numbered 15,963 and formed 52.44%. Total workers numbered 30,439 and formed 35.32% of the total population, and non-workers numbered 55,749 and formed 64.68% of the population.

Note: In the census records a person is considered a cultivator, if the person is engaged in cultivation/ supervision of land owned by self/government/institution. When a person who works on another person's land for wages in cash or kind or share, is regarded as an agricultural labourer. Household industry is defined as an industry conducted by one or more members of the family within the household or village, and one that does not qualify for registration as a factory under the Factories Act. Other workers are persons engaged in some economic activity other than cultivators, agricultural labourers and household workers. It includes factory, mining, plantation, transport and office workers, those engaged in business and commerce, teachers, entertainment artistes and so on.

=== Infrastructure ===
There are 72 inhabited villages in the Mejia CD block, as per the District Census Handbook, Bankura, 2011. 100% villages have power supply. 100% villages have drinking water supply. 14 villages (19.44%) have post offices. 58 villages (18.56%) have telephones (including landlines, public call offices and mobile phones). 18 villages (25.00%) have pucca (paved) approach roads and 19 villages (26.39%) have transport communication (includes bus service, rail facility and navigable waterways). 4 villages (5.56%) have agricultural credit societies and 1 village (1.39%) has a bank.

=== Coal ===
Coal in Raniganj formation is found in Mejia CD block. The seams at shallow depth have non-coking coal suitable for use in thermal power plants. As per the Geological Survey of India, proved reserve is 13.14 million tonnes and indicated reserve is 197.37 million tonnes.

=== Mejia Cement Plant ===
Mejia Cement Plant of Lafarge India is a grinding unit with an annual capacity of 1 million tonnes of cement. It has been operational from March 2009.

=== Ferrous industries ===
Sova Ispat Limited, at Mejia, produces sponge iron, rolled products, ferro alloys and pig iron and has a captive power plant. It employs 5,000 people. Ma Amba Sponge Iron Pvt. Ltd. employs 250 people.

=== Agriculture ===
There were 12 fertiliser depots, 5 seed stores and 34 fair price shops in the CD block.

In 2013-14, persons engaged in agriculture in Mejia CD block could be classified as follows: bargadars 8.37%, patta (document) holders 20.16%, small farmers (possessing land between 1 and 2 hectares) 4.72%, marginal farmers (possessing land up to 1 hectare) 29.47% and agricultural labourers 37.28%.

In 2013-14, the total area irrigated in Mejia CD block was 2,853 hectares, out of which 1,556 hectares by tank water, 720 hectares by river lift irrigation, 327 hectares by shallow tubewells, 100 hectares by open dug wells and 150 hectares by other methods.

In 2013-14, Mejia CD block produced 2,858 tonnes of Aman paddy, the main winter crop, from 1,371 hectares and 12 tonnes of wheat from 6 hectares It also produced pulses and mustard.

=== Handloom and pottery industries ===
The handloom industry engages the largest number of persons in the non farm sector and hence is important in Bankura district. The handloom industry is well established in all the CD Blocks of the district and includes Baluchari saris. In 2004-05 Mejia CD block had 169 looms in operation.

Bankura district is known for the artistic excellence of its pottery products that include the Bankura horse. The range of pottery products is categorised as follows: domestic utilities, terra cotta and other decorative items and roofing tiles and other heavy pottery items. Around 3,200 families were involved in pottery making in the district in 2002. 116 families were involved in Mejia CD block.

=== Banking ===
In 2013-14, Mejia CD block had offices of 2 commercial banks and 2 gramin banks.

=== Backward Regions Grant Fund ===
The Bankura district is listed as a backward region and receives financial support from the Backward Regions Grant Fund. The fund, created by the Government of India, is designed to redress regional imbalances in development. As of 2012, 272 districts across the country were listed under this scheme. The list includes 11 districts of West Bengal.

== Transport ==
In 2013-14, Mejia CD Block had 3 ferry services and 7 originating/ terminating bus routes.

NH 14, (old numbering NH 60), running from Morgram to Kharagpur, passes through this CD Block.

There is a bridge across the Damodar River. It is 35 km from Durgapur.

== Education ==
In 2013-14, Mejia CD block had 75 primary schools with 6,657 students, 12 middle schools with 1,609 students, 4 high schools with 3,236 students and 6 higher secondary schools with 5,275 students. Mejia CD block had 125 institutions for special and non-formal education with 4,022 students. Mejia CD block had 5 mass literacy centres.

See also – Education in India

According to the 2011 census, in the Mejia CD block, among the 72 inhabited villages, 7 villages did not have a school, 27 villages had two or more primary schools, 25 villages had at least 1 primary and 1 middle school and 10 villages had at least 1 middle and 1 secondary school.

Government General Degree College, Mejia was established in 2015.

== Healthcare ==
In 2014, Mejia CD block had 1 rural hospital, 1 block primary health centre and 3 primary health centres with 44 beds and 5 doctors. It had 15 family welfare sub centres and 1 family welfare centre. 4,646 patients were treated indoor and 125,672 patients were treated outdoor in the hospitals, health centres and subcentres of the CD block.

Mejia Block Primary Health Centre, with 25 beds at Mejia, is the major government medical facility in Mejia CD block. There are primary health centres at Ramchandrapur (with 4 beds) and Pairasol (with 10 beds).
