= Swapan Bauri =

Indian politician

Swapan Bauri স্বপন বাউরি

MLA of Saltora Vidhan Sabha Constituency
- In office 2011–2021

Personal details
- Party: All India Trinamool Congress

Swapan Bauri is an Indian politician. He was elected as MLA of Saltora Vidhan Sabha Constituency in West Bengal Legislative Assembly in 2011 and 2016. He is an All India Trinamool Congress politician.
