= Kanti Biswas =

Indian politician

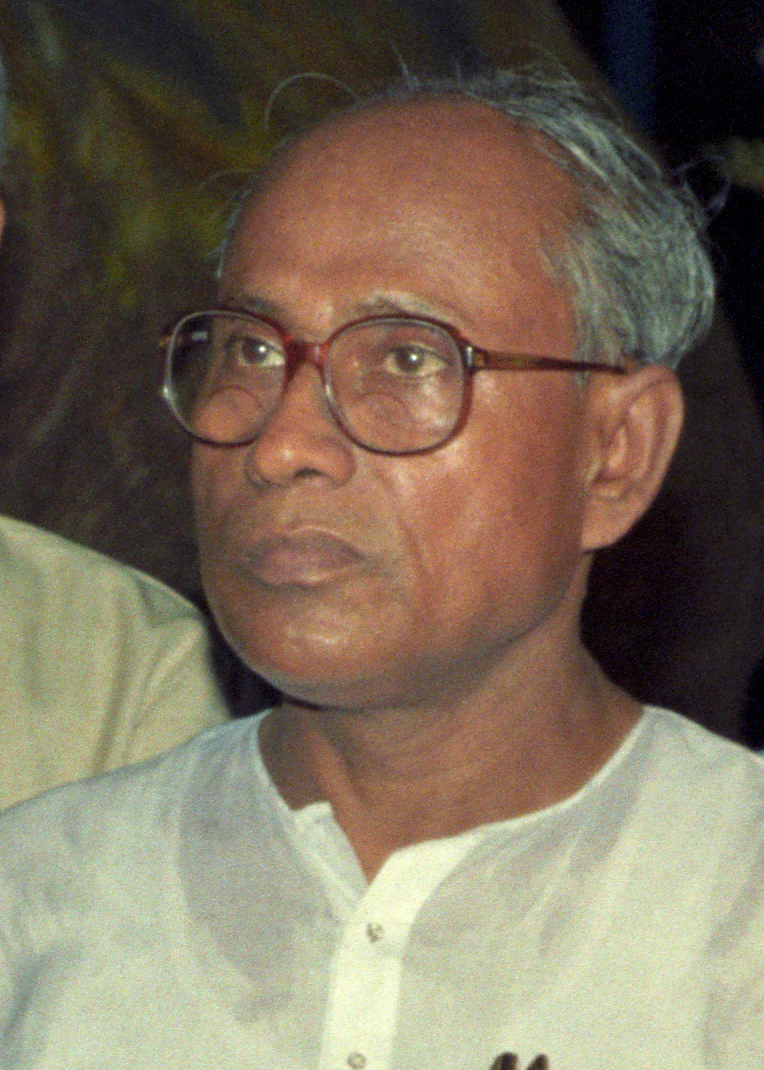
- Biswas in 1995

Minister of School Education, Govt. of W.B
- In office 1982 – 1991; 1996 - 2006
- Succeeded by: Partha De

Minister of Youth Affairs and Home (Passports), Govt. of W.B
- In office 1977 - 1982

Member of Legislative Assembly
- In office 1977 - 1991
- Preceded by: Chandi Pada Mitra
- Succeeded by: Prabir Banejee
- Constituency: Gaighata

Member of Legislative Assembly
- In office 1996 - 2006
- Preceded by: Dhiren Mondal
- Succeeded by: Abani Roy
- Constituency: Sandeshkhali

Personal details
- Born: 1 January 1932 Faridpur, Bengal Presidency, British India
- Died: 27 April 2016 (aged 84) Kolkata, West Bengal, India
- Party: CPI(M)
- Other political affiliations: National Awami Party (Bhashani)
- Occupation: Politician

Kanti Biswas (Bengali: কান্তি বিশ্বাস), was an Indian communist politician and former minister from West Bengal.

== Early life ==
Kanti Biswas was born in Bengali Namasudra caste to Jogendranath Biswas at Bukrail, Kashiani, Faridpur district, Bengal Province in British India.

He did M.Com. and was deeply involved in the student politics of Dacca University, starting with the Bengali Language Movement and later started teaching in Quaid E Azam Memorial College.

Kanti represented the National Awami Party and fought against Sheikh Mujibur Rahman in an election. In 1960, he migrated to West Bengal, India when government of Pakistan banned Communist Party and issued a warrant against him.

== Political career ==
In 1967, he earned the membership of CPI(M) and was associated with the activities of Kisan Sabha, UCRC and DYFI. He was also the member of Dalit Shoshan Mukti Manch and president of Samajik Naya Mancha.

He was one of the few Dalit leaders from CPI(M) who reached till ministerial level during their Government and was also the longest serving Education Minister of the state.

- In 1977, he first elected from Gaighata constituency in state legislative assembly elections and was allotted with Ministry of Youth Affairs and Home (Passports).
- In 1982 and 1987, he was re-elected for Gaighata seat successfully.
- He was elected twice from Sandeshkhali constituency in 1996 and 2001.
- From 1982 to 2006 he served as the Minister of School Education of Bengal. He was the first dalit education minister in India.
- In 1981, he was elected to CPI(M) state committee and in 2012 to CPI(M) State Control Commission which he hold till his death.

He had written a memoir Amar Jeevan: Kichu Katha (Bengali) (আমার জীবন: কিছু কথা) which was published in 2014.

== Death ==
He died in 2016 in a private hospital due to lung infections.
