= Bankura Unnayani Institute of Engineering =

Engineering college in Bankura, West Bengal

Coordinates: 23.1993°N 87.0420°E

- Motto: In Pursuit of Knowledge and Excellence
- Type: A Pvt, "TEQIP-II Funded" and "ISO 9001:2008 Engineering Degree Institute"
- Established: 1998; 28 years ago
- Academic affiliations: Maulana Abul Kalam Azad University of Technology
- Endowment: Funded by Technical Education Quality Improvement Programme (TEQIP) Phase-II
- Chairman: Sasanka Dutta
- Principal: Krishnendu Adhvaryu
- Approvals: AICTE and Department of Higher Education, Ministry of Human Resource Development, Government of India and Directorate of Higher Education, Government of West Bengal.
- Administrative staff: 177
- Students: 2064
- Location: Bankura, West Bengal, 722146, India
- Campus: 11.16 Acres (Institute); 31 Acres (Hostel)
- Present MHRD Projects: National Mission on Education Through ICT (NMEICT) & Quality Enhancement in Engineering Education (QEEE)
- Website: http://www.buie.ac.in

The Bankura Unnayani Institute of Engineering or BUIE is a private (TEQUIP-II funded) sponsored engineering college in West Bengal, India providing under-graduate as well as post-graduate courses in engineering and technology disciplines. It was established in 1998 as the first engineering college in Bankura district.The college is affiliated with Maulana Abul Kalam Azad University of Technology and all the programmes are approved by the All India Council for Technical Education.

The campus is located at Subhankar Nagar, Puabagan, Bankura.

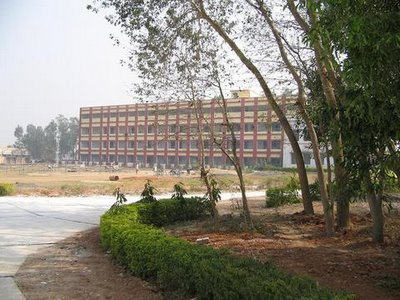
Road to the academic area of BUIE

== Academics ==
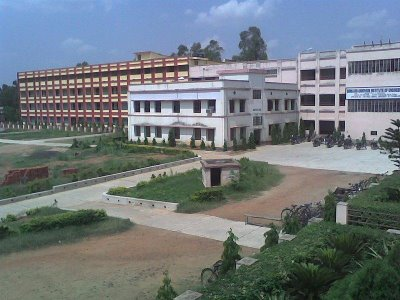
Academic area

The institute offers seven undergraduate courses:-

- B.Tech in Electronics and Communication Engineering (ECE)- 4 years [Approved intake - 120]
- B.Tech in Applied Electronics and Instrumentation Engineering (AEIE)- 4 years [Approved intake - 30]
- B.Tech in Electrical Engineering (EE)- 4 years [Approved intake - 60]
- B.Tech in Mechanical Engineering (ME)- 4 years [Approved intake - 60]
- B.Tech in Computer Science and Engineering (CSE)- 4 years [Approved intake - 60]
- B.Tech in Civil Engineering (CE)- 4 years [Approved intake - 60]
- B.Tech in Information Technology (IT)- 4 years [Approved intake - 30]

The following Postgraduate Degree Programs are offered:-

- M.Tech. in VLSI & Microelectronics- 2 years [Approved intake - 18]
- M.Tech. in Computer Science & Engineering- 2 years [Approved intake - 18]

== See also ==
- All India Council for Technical Education (AICTE)
- Maulana Abul Kalam Azad University of Technology
