= Shyampur, Bankura =

Shyampur
- Village
- Location in West Bengal, India Shyampur (India)
- Coordinates: 23°31′59.9″N 86°55′59.9″E
- Country: India
- State: West Bengal
- District: Bankura
- Established: possible before 1890
- Named for: Sri Krishna

Population (2011)
  - Total: 3,302

Shyampur is a village located in Saltora Tehsil, Bankura district in West Bengal, India. It has a population of approximately 3,300 people.

Shyampur has a high school named Shyampur High School and two primary schools, Shyampur Primary School and Namopara Primary School.

The village is located 5.3 km from the village of Saltora, which is the gram panchayat. The closest town is Raniganj, at a distance of 13 km.

== Demographics ==
Following 2011 Census of India Shyampur had a total population of 3,302 of which (51%) were males and (49%) were females. Population below 6 years was 400. The total number of literates in Shampur was 2,602 (79.27% of the population over 6 years).
