= Kenjakura =

Village in West Bengal, India

Kenjakura is a village in Bankura in the Indian state of West Bengal. The village is under the Bankura I block. It is surrounded by the Dwarakeswar River in the west to south. The village's economy is mostly dependent on rice farming and brassware. The 2011 census stated the village had a population of 3955, of which 2050 were male and 1905 were female.

== Culture ==
The residents of Kenjakura primarily worship Vishvakarma, reflecting the village's significant involvement in bell metal and brassware production, as well as engineering works. Kenjakura has gained regional attention for its export of various goods, including handloom textiles, brass utensils, and a local delicacy known as Giant Jilipis.

== Geography ==
The village is situated at a longitude of 86.874, and latitude of 23.25241. The nearest railway station from Kenjakura is Chhatna railway station. Netaji Subhas Chandra Bose International Airport is the nearest International airport at a distance of 186.2km. The postal code number of Kenjakura is 722139.

== Festivals and rituals ==
Dwarakeswar River is a holy place for the people in Kenjakura. The village god Sanjivani is believed to be reside here near the bank of Dwarakeswar river. Kenjakura and the surrounding villagers celebrate a whole-day festival at 'Maagh 4th' of Bengali calendar. They celebrate the day with a family picnic with puffed rice and raw vegetables. The Giant Jilipis are a type of sweet made of gram flour fried in oil and then dipped in a sugar sauce. Usually the Giant jilipis weighs around 1 to 3 kg per piece.
