= Shampa Daripa =

Indian politician

Shampa Daripa (born 1963) is an Indian politician from West Bengal. She is a former member of the West Bengal Legislative Assembly from Bankura Assembly constituency in Bankura district. She won seat in the 2016 West Bengal Legislative Assembly election representing the Indian National Congress.

== Early life and education ==
Daripa is from Bankura, Bankura district, West Bengal. She married Subrata Daripa. She is the daughter of Prabir Kumar Pandey and the grand daughter of reverend CC Pandey. She completed her BA at a college affiliated with Burdwan University in 1993. She and her husband run their own business.

== Career ==
Daripa won from Bankura Assembly constituency representing the Indian National Congress in the 2016 West Bengal Legislative Assembly election. She polled 83,486 votes and defeated her nearest rival, Minati Misra of the All India Trinamool Congress, by a margin of 1,029 votes. Earlier, she served as the chairperson of the Bankura Municipality. In 2016, she shifted to Indian National Congress after she was denied a ticket by the Trinamool Congress. Later, she returned to her old party, the Trinamool Congress, but was denied a ticket again for the 2021 West Bengal Legislative Assembly election. So she decided to join the Bharatiya Janata Party.
