= Saltora =

- Village
- Location in West Bengal, India Saltora (India)
- Coordinates: 23°31′59.9″N 86°55′59.9″E
- Country: India
- State: West Bengal
- District: Bankura

Population (2011)
  - Total: 3,966

Languages
  - Official: Bengali, English
- Time zone: UTC+5:30 (IST)
- PIN: 722158 (Saltora)
- Telephone/STD code: 03241
- Lok Sabha constituency: Bankura
- Vidhan Sabha constituency: Saltora
- Website: bankura.gov.in

Saltora is a village in Saltora CD block in Bankura Sadar subdivision of Bankura district in the state of West Bengal, India.

== Geography ==
Places in Bankura Sadar subdivision in Bankura district
M: municipal town/ city, CT: census town, R: rural/ urban centre, H: hill centre, T: temple/ religious centre, B: barrage
Owing to space constraints in the small map, the actual locations in a larger map may vary slightly

=== Location ===
Saltora is located at 23°31′59.9″N 86°55′59.9″E.

=== Area overview ===
The map alongside shows the Bankura Sadar subdivision of Bankura district. Physiographically, this area is part of the Bankura Uplands in the west gradually merging with the Bankura-Bishnupur Rarh Plains in the north-east. The western portions are characterised by undulating terrain with many hills and ridges. The area is having a gradual descent from the Chota Nagpur Plateau. The soil is laterite red and hard beds are covered with scrub jungle and sal wood. Gradually it gives way to just uneven rolling lands but the soil continues to be lateritic. There are coal mines in the northern part, along the Damodar River. It is a predominantly rural area with 89% of the population living in rural areas and only 11% living in the urban areas.

Note: The map alongside presents some of the notable locations in the subdivision. All places marked in the map are linked in the larger full screen map.

== Demographics ==
According to the 2011 Census of India, Saltora had a total population of 3,966 of which 2,037 (51%) were males and 1,929 (49%) were females. Population below 6 years was 400. The total number of literates in Saltora was 2,602 (79.27% of the population over 6 years).

== Civic administration ==
=== CD block HQ ===
The headquarters of Saltora CD block are located at Saltora.

=== Police station ===
Saltora police station has jurisdiction over Saltora CD block. The area covered is 312.62 km^{2} and the population covered is 134,717.

== Transport ==
State Highway 8 running from Santaldih (in Purulia district) to Mejia (in Bankura district) passes through Saltora.

== Education ==
Saltora Netaji Centenary College was established in 2001. Affiliated with the Bankura University, it offers honours courses in Bengali, Sanskrit, English, history, music, philosophy, political science and a general course in arts.

Saltora Dr. Bidhan Chandra Vidyapith is a Bengali-medium coeducational institution established in 1962. It has facilities for teaching from class V to class XII. The school has 10 computers, a library with 2,000 books and a playground.

Saltora Girls High School is a Bengali-medium girls only institution established in 1996. It has facilities for teaching from class V to class XII. The school has 15 computers and a library with 3,999 books.

Saltora B. Ed. College is a B. Ed and D. Ed Composite College, it was established in 2005. It offers B. Ed and D. Ed course each with intake of 100.

== Healthcare ==
Saltora Rural Hospital, with 30 beds, is the major government medical facility in the Saltora CD block. There are primary health centres at Gogra (with 10 beds), Ituri (Tiluri) (with 10 beds) and Kashtora (with 6 beds).
