= Saltora Assembly constituency =

Saltora
- Constituency No. 247 for the West Bengal Legislative Assembly
- Interactive Map Outlining Saltora Assembly Constituency

Constituency details
- Country: India
- Region: East India
- State: West Bengal
- District: Bankura
- Lok Sabha constituency: Bankura
- Established: 2011
- Total electors: 188,583
- Reservation: SC

Member of Legislative Assembly
- 18th West Bengal Legislative Assembly
- Incumbent Chandana Bauri
- Party: BJP
- Alliance: NDA
- Elected year: 2021

Saltora Assembly constituency is an assembly constituency in Bankura district in the Indian state of West Bengal. It is reserved for scheduled castes.

== Overview ==
As per orders of the Delimitation Commission, No. 247 Saltora Assembly constituency (SC) is composed of the following: Saltora and Mejia community development blocks; Banasuria, Barashal, Lachhmanpur and Latiaboni gram panchayats of Gangajalghati community development block.

Saltora Assembly constituency (SC) is part of No. 36 Bankura (Lok Sabha constituency).

== Members of the Legislative Assembly ==
Year	Members	Party
2011	Swapan Bauri	Trinamool Congress
2016	Swapan Bauri	Trinamool Congress
2021	Chandana Bauri	Bharatiya Janata Party
2026	Chandana Bauri	Bharatiya Janata Party

== Election results ==
=== 2026 ===
2026 West Bengal Legislative Assembly election: Saltora
Party	Candidate	Votes	%	±%
BJP	Chandana Bouri	115,180	52.72	+7.44
AITC	Uttam Bauri	83,045	38.01	−5.22
CPI(M)	Nandadulal Bauri	10,500	4.81	−2.15
INC	Amarkanta Mandal	3,103	1.42	
SUCI(C)	Dipen Bauri	2,023	0.93	−0.19
NOTA	None of the above	2,771	1.27	−0.39
Majority		32,135	14.71	+12.66
Turnout		218,491	93.56	+6.51
BJP hold		Swing		

=== 2021 ===
In the 2021 elections, Chandana Bauri of BJP defeated her nearest rival, Sontosh Kumar Mondal of Trinamool Congress.

2021 West Bengal Legislative Assembly election: Saltora
Party	Candidate	Votes	%	±%
BJP	Chandana Bauri	91,648	45.28	+37.13
AITC	Sontosh Kumar Mondal	87,503	43.23	
CPI(M)	Nandadulal Bauri	14,084	6.96	−29.43
BMP	Aditya Kumar Bauri	3,554	1.76	+0.53
SUCI(C)	Dipen Bauri	2,261	1.12	−0.1
NOTA	None of the above	3,363	1.66	
Majority		4,145	2.05	
Turnout		202,413	87.05	
BJP gain from AITC		Swing		

=== 2016 ===
In the 2016 elections, Swapan Bauri of Trinamool Congress defeated his nearest rival, Sasthi Charan Bauri of CPI(M).

West Bengal assembly elections, 2016: Saltora (SC)
Party	Candidate	Votes	%	±%
AITC	Swapan Bauri	84,979	46.20	−4.40
CPI(M)	Sasthi Charan Bauri	72,456	39.39	−3.43
BJP	Snehasis Mondal	14,991	8.15	+1.57
NOTA	None of the above	4,801	2.61	
BMP	Dipak Kumar Bhuiya	2,260	1.23	
SUCI(C)	Dipen Bauri	2,237	1.22	
Independent	Mahananda Maji	2,214	1.20	
Turnout		183,938	86.37	−0.19
AITC hold		Swing		

=== 2011 ===
In the 2011 elections, Swapan Bauri of Trinamool Congress defeated his nearest rival, Sasthi Charan Bauri of CPI(M).

West Bengal assembly elections, 2011: Saltora (SC)
Party	Candidate	Votes	%	±%
AITC	Swapan Bauri	82,597	50.60	+11.43#
CPI(M)	Sasthi Charan Bauri	69,900	42.82	−16.29
BJP	Mangal Chandra Mandal	10,741	6.58	
Turnout		163,238	86.56	
AITC gain from CPI(M)		Swing	27.72#	

.# Swing calculated on Congress+Trinamool Congress vote percentages taken together in 2006, for the now defunct Gangajalghati constituency.
