= Bankura Assembly constituency =

Bankura
- Constituency No. 252 for the West Bengal Legislative Assembly
- Interactive Map Outlining Bankura Assembly Constituency

Constituency details
- Country: India
- Region: East India
- State: West Bengal
- District: Bankura
- Lok Sabha constituency: Bankura
- Established: 1951
- Total electors: 2,60,886
- Reservation: None

Member of Legislative Assembly
- 18th West Bengal Legislative Assembly
- Incumbent Niladri Sekhar Dana
- Party: BJP
- Alliance: NDA
- Elected year: 2026

Bankura Assembly constituency is an assembly constituency in Bankura district in the Indian state of West Bengal.

== Overview ==
As per orders of the Delimitation Commission, No. 252 Bankura Assembly constituency is composed of the following: Bankura municipality; Bankura I community development block; and Junbedia, Mankanali and Purandarpur gram panchayats of Bankura II community development block.

Bankura Assembly constituency is part of No. 36 Bankura (Lok Sabha constituency).

== Members of the Legislative Assembly ==
Year	Name	Party
1952	Rakhahari Chatterjee	Akhil Bharatiya Hindu Mahasabha
1957	Shishuram Mandal	Indian National Congress
1957	Anath Bandhu Roy	Indian National Congress
1962	Aboni Bhattacharya	Communist Party of India (Marxist)
1967	S. Mitra	Indian National Congress
1969	Bireshwar Ghosh	Communist Party of India (Marxist)
1971	Kashinath Misra	Indian National Congress
1972	Kashinath Misra	Indian National Congress
1977	Partha De	Communist Party of India (Marxist)
1982	Kashinath Misra	Indian National Congress
1987	Partha De	Communist Party of India (Marxist)
1991	Partha De	Communist Party of India (Marxist)
1996	Partha De	Communist Party of India (Marxist)
2001	Kashinath Misra	Trinamool Congress
2006	Partha De	Communist Party of India (Marxist)
2011	Kashinath Misra	Trinamool Congress
2012^	Minati Misra	Trinamool Congress
2016	Shampa Daripa	Indian National Congress
2021	Niladri Sekhar Dana	Bharatiya Janata Party
2026	Niladri Sekhar Dana	Bharatiya Janata Party

- ^ by-election

== Election results ==
=== 2026 ===
2026 West Bengal Legislative Assembly election: Bankura
Party	Candidate	Votes	%	±%
BJP	Niladri Sekhar Dana	136,992	57.24	▲13.45
AITC	Anup Mandal	82,815	34.6	▼8.52
CPI(M)	Avoyananda Mukhopadhyay	9,702	4.05	
INC	Arup Banerjee	2,213	0.92	▼5.39
NOTA	None of the above	3,533	1.48	▼0.59
Majority		54,177	22.64	▲21.97
Turnout		239,331	91.5	▲10.71
BJP hold		Swing		

=== 2021 ===
2021 West Bengal Legislative Assembly election: Bankura
Party	Candidate	Votes	%	±%
BJP	Niladri Sekhar Dana	95,466	43.79	▲33.09
AITC	Sayantika Banerjee	93,998	43.12	
INC	Radharani Banerjee	13,764	6.31	▼37.19
Independent	Swadesh Mandal	3,303	1.52	
NOTA	None of the above	4,507	2.07	
Majority		1,468	0.67	
Turnout		217,986	80.79	
BJP gain from INC		Swing		

=== 2016 ===
West Bengal assembly elections, 2016: Bankura
Party	Candidate	Votes	%	±%
INC	Shampa Daripa	83,486	43.50	
AITC	Minati Mishra	82,457	42.90	
BJP	Subhas Sarkar	20,571	10.70	
SUCI(C)	Swapan Nag	2,138	1.10	
BSP	Lal Mohan Malla	1,999	1.00	
NOTA	None of the Above	4,607	2.34	
Majority		1,029	0.52	
Turnout		1,96,657	80.44	
INC gain from AITC		Swing		

.# Swing calculated on LF+Congress vote percentages taken together in 2016.

=== 2012 ===
In 2012, a by-election was necessitated by the death of sitting Trinamool Congress MLA Kashinath Misra . Minati Misra of Trinamool Congress defeated her nearest rival Nilanjan Dasgupta of CPI(M) by 15,138 votes.

=== 2011 ===
West Bengal assembly elections, 2011: Bankura
Party	Candidate	Votes	%	±%
AITC	Kashinath Misra	93,835	53.93	+9.62#
CPI(M)	Pratip Mukherjee	63,745	37.03	−8.65
BJP	Anil Ghosh	5,732	3.33	
Independent	Swapan Kumar Mondal	3,112		
BSP	Anil Pal	1,877		
Independent	Bijoy Chandra Mondal	1,789		
JVM(P)	Jabbar Sekh	1,783		
Independent	Bhakta Ranjan Nayak	1,281		
Turnout		172,154	80.36	
AITC gain from CPI(M)		Swing	17.87#	

.# Swing calculated on Congress+Trinamool Congress vote percentages taken together in 2006.

=== 2006 ===
In the 2006 state assembly elections, Partha De of CPI(M) won the Bankura assembly seat defeating his nearest rival Kashinath Mishra of Trinamool Congress. Contests in most years were multi cornered but only winners and runners are being mentioned. Kashinath Mishra of Trinamool Congress defeated Partha De of CPI(M) in 2001. Partha De of CPI(M) defeated Asis Chakraborty of Congress in 1996, and Kashinath Mishra of Congress in 1991 and 1987. Kashinath Mishra of Congress defeated Partha De of CPI(M) in 1982. Partha De of CPI(M) defeated Anandi Kundu of Janata Party in 1977.

=== 1972 ===
Kashinath Mishra of Congress won in 1972 and 1971. Bireshwar Ghosh of CPI won in 1969. S.Mitra of Congress won in 1967. Aboni Bhattacharya of CPI won in 1962. Bankura had a dual seat in 1957. It was won by Shishuram Mandal and Anath Bandhu Roy, both of Congress. Rakhahari Chatterjee of Hindu Mahasabha won in independent India's first election in 1952.
