= Bankura I =

- Community development block
- Interactive map of Bankura I
- Coordinates: 23.25°N 87.07°E
- Country: India
- State: West Bengal
- District: Bankura

Government
  - Type: Representative democracy

Area
  - Total: 171.09 km^{2} (66.06 sq mi)
- Elevation: 89 m (292 ft)

Population (2011)
  - Total: 107,685
  - Density: 629.41/km^{2} (1,630.2/sq mi)

Languages
  - Official: Bengali, English
- Time zone: UTC+5:30 (IST)
- PIN: 722101 (Bankura); 722102 (Kenduadihi); 722139 (Kenjakura); 722146 (Rajagram )
- Telephone/STD code: 03241
- ISO 3166 code: IN-WB
- Vehicle registration: WB-67, WB-68
- Literacy: 68.74%
- Lok Sabha constituency: Bankura
- Vidhan Sabha constituency: Bankura
- Website: bankura1block.org

Bankura I is a community development block (CD block) that forms an administrative division in the Bankura Sadar subdivision of the Bankura district in the Indian state of West Bengal.

== History ==
=== From the Bishnupur kingdom to the British Raj ===
From around the 7th century AD till around the advent of British rule, for around a millennium, the history of Bankura district is identical with the rise and fall of the Hindu Rajas of Bishnupur. The Bishnupur Rajas, who were at the summit of their fortunes towards the end of the 17th century, started declining in the first half of the 18th century. First, the Maharaja of Burdwan seized the Fatehpur Mahal, and then the Maratha invasions laid waste to their country.

Bishnupur was ceded to the British with the rest of Burdwan chakla in 1760. In 1787, Bishnupur was united with Birbhum to form a separate administrative unit. In 1793 it was transferred to the Burdwan collectorate. In 1879, the district acquired its present shape with the thanas of Khatra and Raipur and the outpost of Simplapal being transferred from Manbhum, and the thanas of Sonamukhi, Kotulpur and Indas being retransferred from Burdwan. However, it was known for sometime as West Burdwan and in 1881 came to be known as Bankura district.

== Geography ==
Map of Bankura District showing CD blocks and municipalities

Bankura is located at 23°15′N 87°04′E.

Bankura I CD block is located in the central part of the district. It belongs to the Bankura-Bishnupur Rarh Plains. The elevation rises gradually in the undulating surface area but in the hilly tract it rises abruptly.

Bankura I CD block is bounded by Chhatna CD block on a part of the north and the west, Bankura II CD block in part of the north, Onda CD block on the east, and Indpur CD block on the south.

Bankura I CD block has an area of 171.09 km^{2}. It has 1 panchayat samity, 6 gram panchayats, 82 gram sansads (village councils), 150 mouzas and 137 inhabited villages. Bankura and Bankura Women police stations serve this block. Headquarters of this CD block are at Puabagan.

Gram panchayats of Bankura I block/ panchayat samiti are: Anchuri, Andharthol, Jagadlla I, Jagadlla II, Kalapathar and Kenjakura.

== Demographics ==
=== Population ===
According to the 2011 Census of India, Bankura I CD block had a total population of 107,685, all of which were rural. There were 55,079 (51%) males and 52,606 (49%) females. Population in the age range of 0 to 6 years was 12,553. Scheduled Castes numbered 39,953 (37.10%) and Scheduled Tribes numbered 6,554 (6.09%).

According to the 2001 census, Bankura I block had a total population of 95,824, out of which 48,988 were males and 46,836 were females. Bankura I block registered a population growth of 13.49 per cent during the 1991-2001 decade. Decadal growth for the district was 13.79 per cent. Growth in West Bengal was 17.84 per cent.

Large villages (with 4,000+ population) in Bankura I CD block are (2011 census figures in brackets): Dhaldanga (4,058).

Other villages in Bankura I CD block are (2011 census figures in brackets): Andharthaul (2,177), Kalapathar (1,173), Kenjakura (3,955), Achuri (3,386) and Jagadalla (2,660).

=== Literacy ===
According to the 2011 census, the total number of literates in Bankura I CD block was 65,395 (68.74% of the population over 6 years) out of which males numbered 38,513 (79.87% of the male population over 6 years) and females numbered 26,882 (57.87%) of the female population over 6 years). The gender disparity (the difference between female and male literacy rates) was 21.25%.

As per the 2011 census, literacy in Bankura district was 70.26%, up from 63.44 in 2001 and 52.00% in 1991. Literacy in West Bengal was 77.08% in 2011. Literacy in India in 2011 was 74.04%.

See also – List of West Bengal districts ranked by literacy rate

Literacy in CD blocks of
Bankura district
Bankura Sadar subdivision
Saltora – 61.45%
Mejia – 66.83%
Gangajalghati – 68.11%
Chhatna – 65.73%
Bankura I – 68.74%
Bankura II – 73.59%
Barjora – 71.67%
Onda – 65.82%
Bishnupur subdivision
Indas – 71.70%
Joypur – 74.57%
Patrasayer – 64.8%
Kotulpur – 78.01%
Sonamukhi – 66.16%
Bishnupur – 66.30%
Khatra subdivision
Indpur – 67.42%
Ranibandh – 68.53%
Khatra – 72.18%
Hirbandh – 64.18%
Raipur – 71.33%
Sarenga – 74.25%
Simlapal – 68.44%
Taldangra – 70.87%
2011 Census: CD Block Wise

Primary Census Abstract Data

=== Language and religion ===
Religion in Bankura I CD block (2011)
Hinduism	83.12%
Islam	14.08%
Other (tribal religion)	2.52%
Other or not stated	0.28%

In the 2011 census Hindus numbered 89,511 and formed 83.12% of the population in Bankura I CD block. Muslims numbered 15,158 and formed 14.08% of the population. Christians numbered 42 and formed 0.04% of the population. Others numbered 2,974 and formed 2.76% of the population. Others include Addi Bassi, Marang Boro, Santal, Saranath, Sari Dharma, Sarna, Alchchi, Bidin, Sant, Saevdharm, Seran, Saran, Sarin, Kheria, and other religious communities. In 2001, Hindus were 85.44% while Muslims were 13.20% of the population.

Languages of Bankura I CD block (2011)
1. Bengali (95.8%)
2. Santali (4.06%)
3. Others (0.18%)

At the time of the 2011 census, 95.76% of the population spoke Bengali and 4.06% Santali as their first language.

== Rural poverty ==
In Bankura I CD block 42.84% families were living below poverty line in 2007. According to the Rural Household Survey in 2005, 28.87% of the total number of families were BPL families in the Bankura district.

Migration has been observed in the following CD blocks of Bankura district: Bankura I, Chhatna, Saltora, Indpur, Ranibandh, Hirbandh, Khatra, Raipur and Sarenga. Although authentic figures are not available, a sample survey has been done. According to the sample survey, around 54.5% to 85.4% of the families on an average migrate from these blocks. Another study shows that around 23% of the people from the under-privileged blocks in the western and southern Bankura migrate. Those migrating belong mostly to the SC or ST population. They migrate for periods varying from 15 days to 6/8 months. Most people migrate to meet their food deficit and go to Bardhaman and Hooghly districts but some go to Gujarat and Maharashtra as construction labour.

== Economy ==
=== Livelihood ===
Livelihood
in Bankura I CD block
1. Cultivators (19.2%)
2. Agricultural labourers (29.1%)
3. Household industries (7.21%)
4. Other Workers (44.5%)

In the Bankura I CD block in 2011, among the class of total workers, cultivators numbered 7,744 and formed 19.20%, agricultural labourers numbered 11,751 and formed 29.14%, household industry workers numbered 2,906 and formed 7.21% and other workers numbered 17,926 and formed 44.45%. Total workers numbered 40,327 and formed 37.45% of the total population, and non-workers numbered 67,358 and formed 62.55% of the population.

Note: In the census records a person is considered a cultivator, if the person is engaged in cultivation/ supervision of land owned by self/government/institution. When a person who works on another person's land for wages in cash or kind or share, is regarded as an agricultural labourer. Household industry is defined as an industry conducted by one or more members of the family within the household or village, and one that does not qualify for registration as a factory under the Factories Act. Other workers are persons engaged in some economic activity other than cultivators, agricultural labourers and household workers. It includes factory, mining, plantation, transport and office workers, those engaged in business and commerce, teachers, entertainment artistes and so on.

=== Infrastructure ===
There are 137 inhabited villages in the Bankura I CD block, as per the District Census Handbook, Bankura, 2011. 100% villages have power supply. 100% villages have drinking water supply. 19 villages (13.87%) have post offices. 108 villages (78.83%) have telephones (including landlines, public call offices and mobile phones). 32 villages (23.36%) have pucca (paved) approach roads and 50 villages (36.50%) have transport communication (includes bus service, rail facility and navigable waterways). 17 villages (12.41%) have agricultural credit societies and 9 villages (6.57%) have banks.

=== Agriculture ===
There were 42 fertiliser depots, 20 seed stores and 47 fair price shops in the CD Block.

In Bankura district in 2010–11, 34.92% of the operational holdings were held in marginal holdings of less than 1 hectare by 68.22% of the holders. Another 31.16% of the operational holdings were held in small holdings between 1 and 2 hectares by 21.05% of the holders. In Bankura district, 23,389 hectares of vested land was distributed amongst 191,915 beneficiaries up to 31 October 2013.

In 2013–14, persons engaged in agriculture in Bankura I CD block could be classified as follows: bargadars 6.29%, patta (document) holders 10.26%, small farmers (possessing land between 1 and 2 hectares) 13.72%, marginal farmers (possessing land up to 1 hectare) 39.28% and agricultural labourers 30.45%.

In 2003-04 net area sown Bankura I CD block was 10,844 hectares and the area in which more than one crop was grown was 1,869 hectares.

In 2013–14, the total area irrigated in Bankura I CD block was 2,326 hectares, out of which 198 hectares by canal water, 925 hectares by tank water, 660 hectares by river lift irrigation, 78 hectares by shallow tubewells, 300 hectares by open dug wells and 165 hectares by other means.

In 2013–14, Bankura I CD block produced 25,440 tonnes of Aman paddy, the main winter crop, from 9,255 hectares, 319 tonnes of Aus paddy from 15 hectares, 12 tonnes of Boro paddy from 4 hectares, 14 tonnes of wheat from 6 hectares, 1,524,000 tonnes of potatoes from 55 hectare (yield 27,700 kg per hectare). It also produced pulses and mustard.

=== Handloom and pottery industries ===
The handloom industry engages the largest number of persons in the non farm sector and hence is important in Bankura district. The handloom industry is well established in all the CD Blocks of the district and includes the famous Baluchari saris. In 2004-05 Bankura I CD block had 762 looms in operation. Bankura municipality (outside the CD block) had 2,126 looms in operation.

Bankura district is famous for the artistic excellence of its pottery products that include the famous Bankura horse. The range of pottery products is categorised as follows: domestic utilities, terracota and other decorative items and roofing tiles and other heavy pottery items. The terracotta and decorative items include horse, elephant, tiger, ox, flower vase, Mansa Saj, ash-tray and other items of religious use. These are produced in the following CD blocks: Taldangra, Sonamukhi, Sarenga, Bankura I and Bankura II. Around 3,200 families were involved in pottery making in the district in 2002. 115 families were involved in Bankura I CD block.

=== Banking ===
In 2013–14, Bankura I CD block had offices of 6 commercial banks and 1 gramin banks.

=== Backward Regions Grant Fund ===
The Bankura district is listed as a backward region and receives financial support from the Backward Regions Grant Fund. The fund, created by the Government of India, is designed to redress regional imbalances in development. As of 2012, 272 districts across the country were listed under this scheme. The list includes 11 districts of West Bengal.

== Transport ==
In 2013–14, Bankura I CD block had 6 originating/ terminating bus routes.

The Kharagpur–Bankura–Adra line of South Eastern Railway passes through this CD block. There are stations at Bankura and Anchuri.

National Highway 14, (old numbering NH 60), running from Morgram to Kharagpur, passes through this CD block.

State Highway 9 (West Bengal) running from Durgapur (in Paschim Bardhaman district) to Nayagram (in Jhargram district) passes through this CD block.

== Education ==
In 2013–14, Bankura I CD block had 109 primary schools with 10,663 students, 10 middle schools with 1,042 students, 14 high schools with 8,352 students and 9 higher secondary schools with 9,137 students. Bankura I CD block had 1 professional/ technical institution with 996 students and 177 institutions for special and non-formal education with 4,905 students. Bankura (municipal town) had 3 colleges and universities outside the CD block. Bankura I CD block had 6 mass literacy centres.

See also – Education in India

According to the 2011 census, in the Bankura I CD block, among the 137 inhabited villages, 28 villages did not have a school, 27 villages had two or more primary schools, 26 villages had at least 1 primary and 1 middle school and 14 villages had at least 1 middle and 1 secondary school.

== Healthcare ==
In 2014, Bankura I CD block had 1 hospital, 1 rural hospital and 2 primary health centres with total 650 beds and 5 doctors. It had 18 family welfare sub centres and 1 family welfare centre. 3,548 patients were treated indoor and 147,704 patients were treated outdoor in the hospitals, health centres and subcentres of the CD block.

Anchuri Rural Hospital, with 30 beds at Achuri, is the major government medical facility in the Bankura I CD block. There are primary health centres at Helna Susunia (with 10 beds) and Kanjakura (with 10 beds).
