= Bankura district =

District in West Bengal, India

Bankura district Bā̃kuɽā Jelā (Bengali)
- District of West Bengal
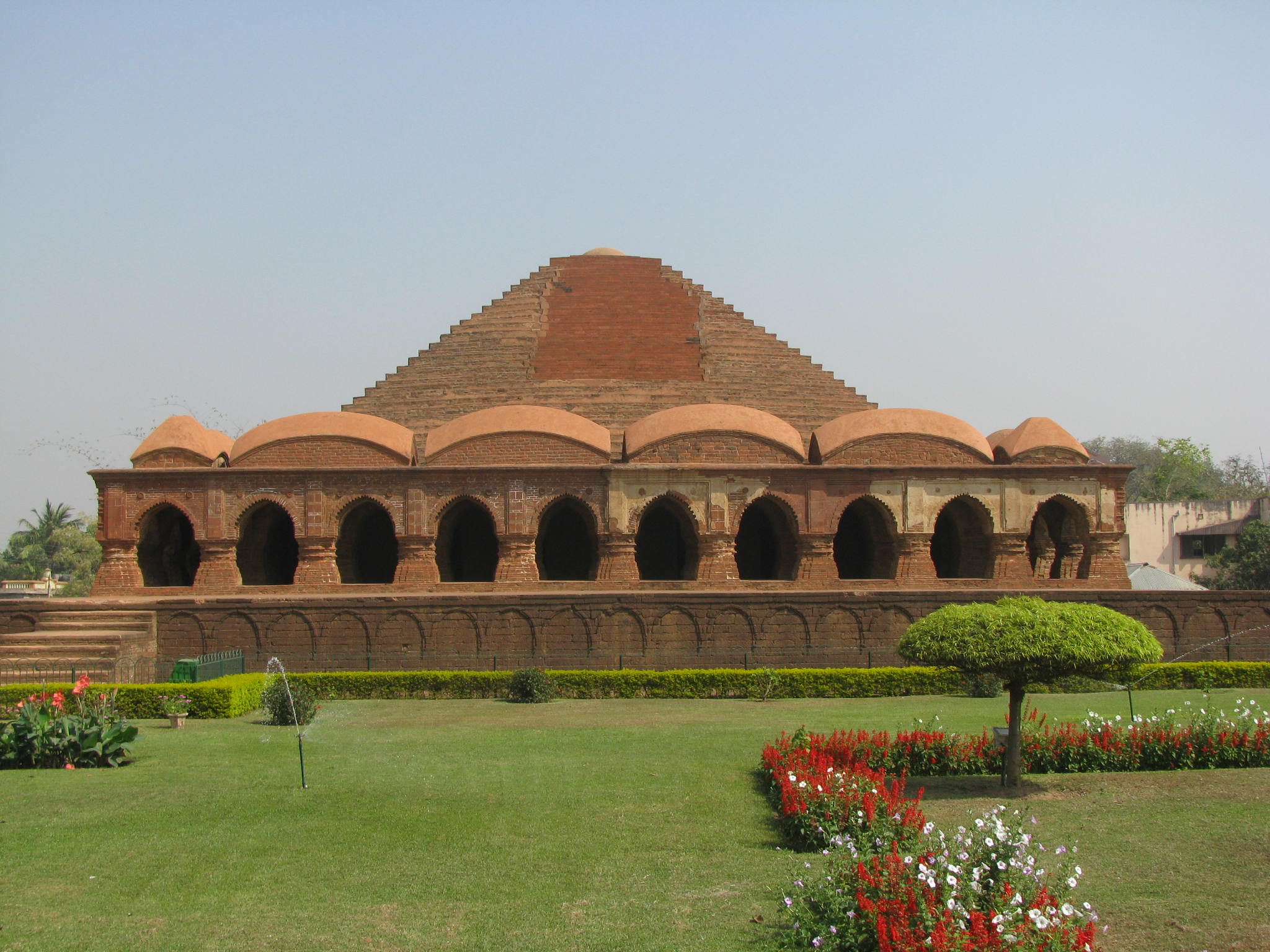
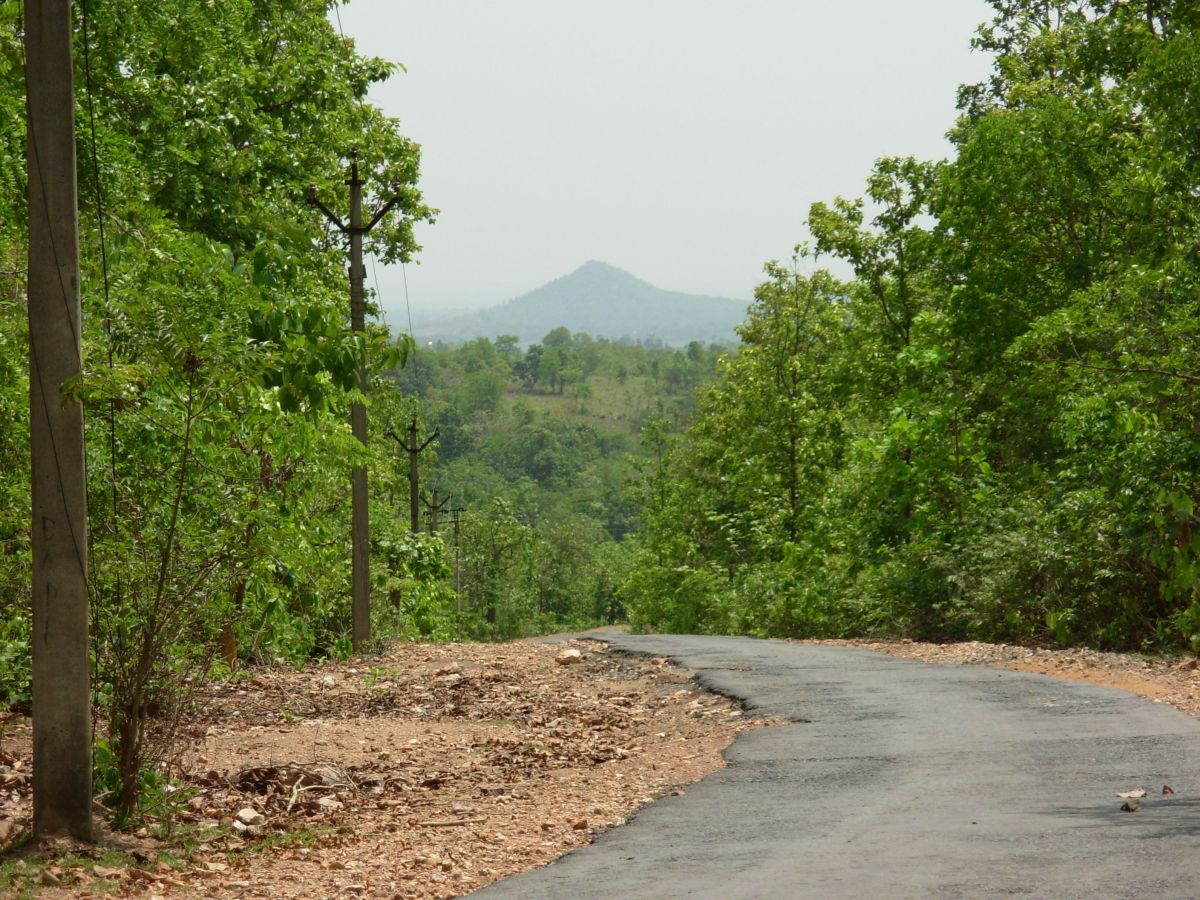
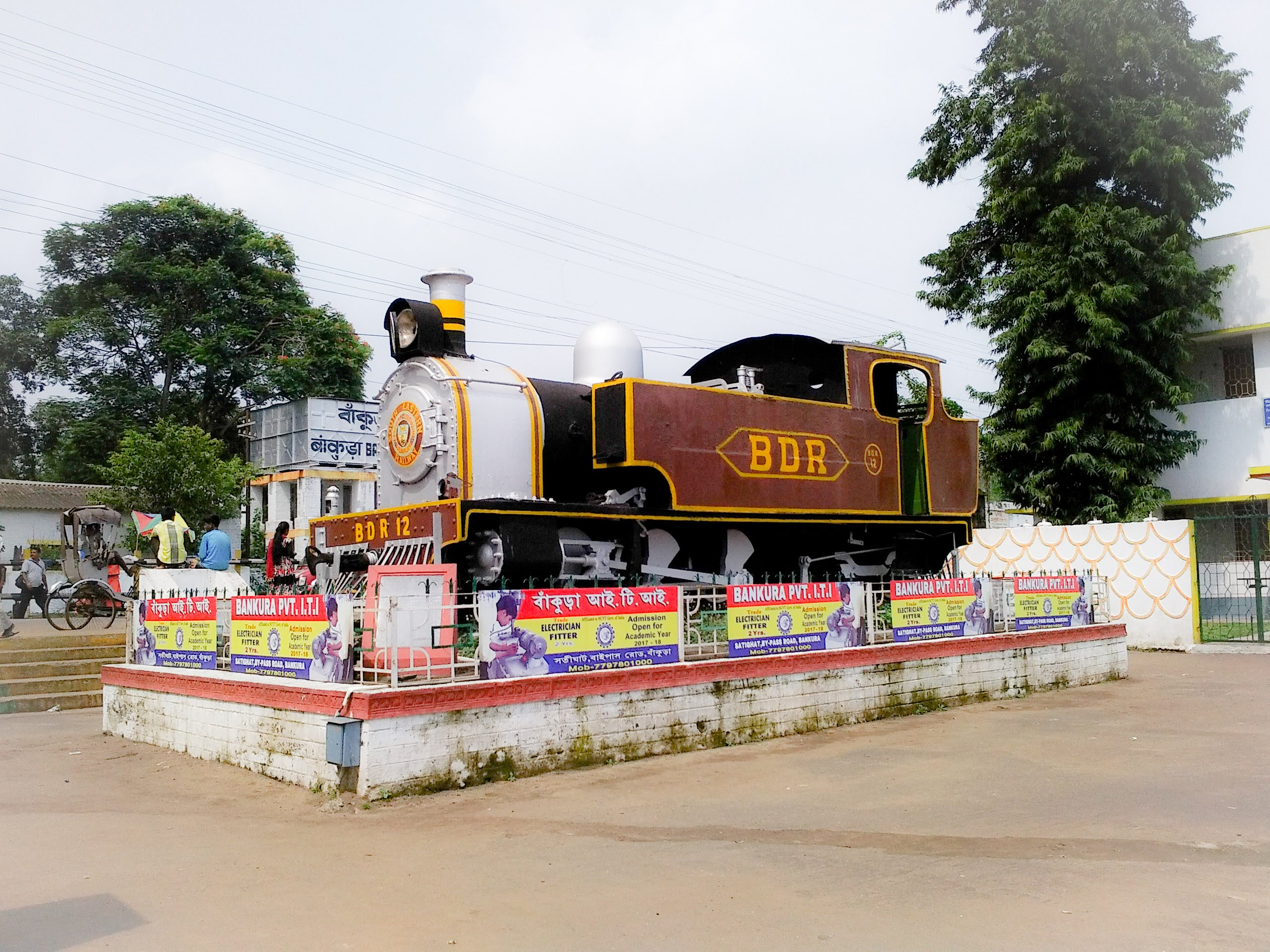
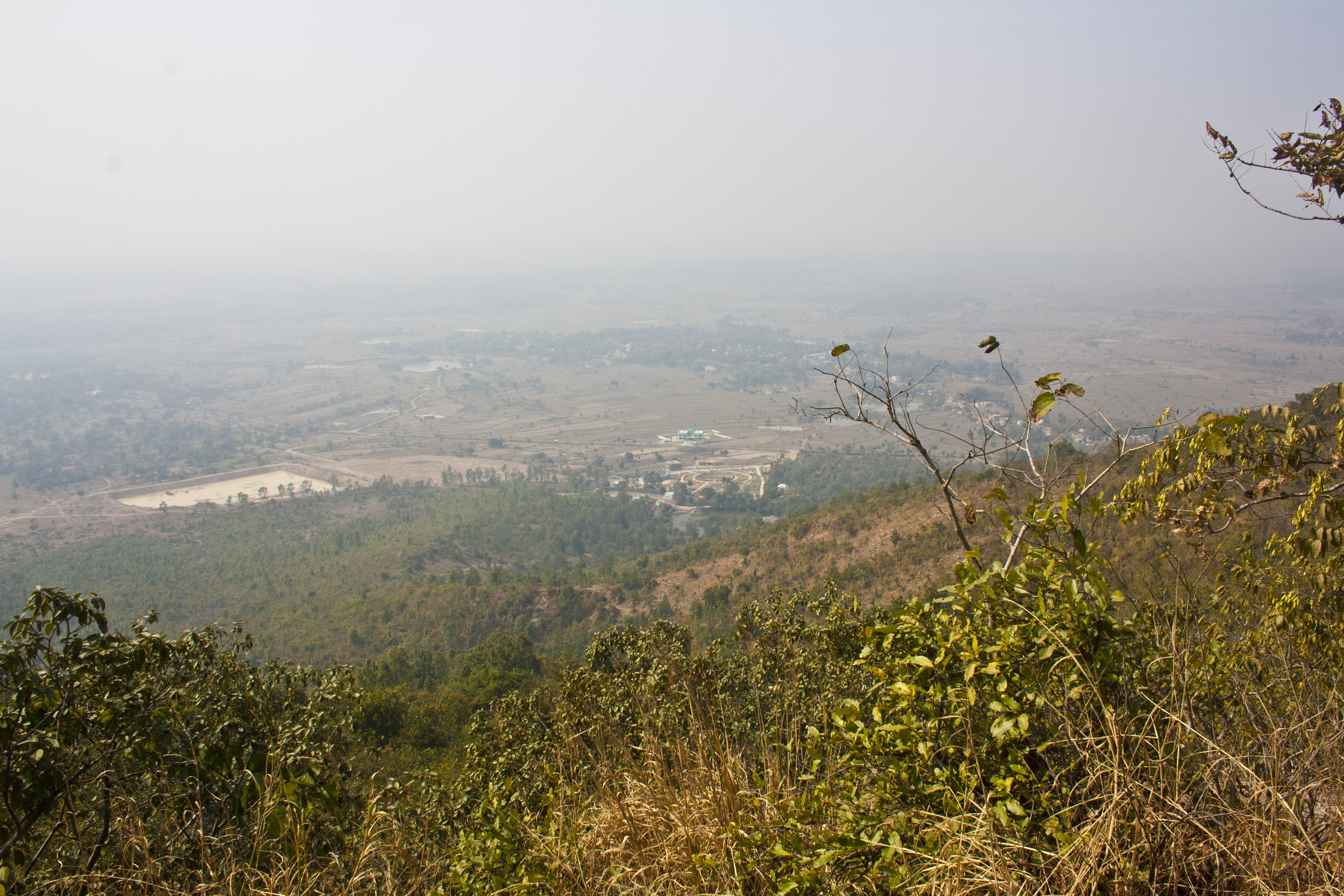
- Clockwise from top-left: Rasmancha in Bishnupur, Mukutmanipur Dam, old locomotive in Bankura, Susunia Hill, Forest near Mahadebsinan Hill

- Location of Bankura district in West Bengal
- Coordinates: 23.25°N 87.07°E
- Country: India
- State: West Bengal
- Division: Medinipur
- Formed (as a district): c. 1881
- Named for: Bankura town
- Headquarters: Bankura
- District subdivisions: Bankura Sadar; Khatra; Bishnupur

Government
  - Member of Parliament: Arup Chakraborty (TMC); Saumitra Khan (BJP)
  - District Magistrate and Collector: Shri Aneesh Dasgupta, IAS
  - Superintendent of Police: Shri Soumyadip Bhattachrya, IPS

Area
  - Total: 6,882 km^{2} (2,657 sq mi)

Population (2011)
  - Total: 3,596,674
  - Density: 522.6/km^{2} (1,354/sq mi)
  - Urban: 235,264

Demographics
  - Sex ratio: 914/1000 ♂/♀
  - Literacy rate: 70.95%
  - Scheduled Castes: 32.65% (1,174,447)
  - Scheduled Tribes: 10.25% (368,690)

Languages
  - Official: Bengali
  - Additional official: English
- Time zone: UTC+05:30 (IST)
- Website: bankura.gov.in

Bankura district (Pron: bā̃kuɽā) is an administrative unit in the Indian state of West Bengal. It is part of Medinipur division—one of the five administrative divisions of West Bengal. Bankura district is surrounded by Purba Bardhaman district and Paschim Bardhaman district in the north, Purulia district in the west, Jhargram district and Paschim Medinipur district in the south, and some part of Hooghly district in the east. Damodar River flows in the northern part of Bankura district and separates it with the major part of Burdwan district. The district head quarter is located in Bankura town.

The district has been described as the "connecting link between the plains of Bengal on the east and Chota Nagpur Plateau on the west." The areas to the east and north-east are low-lying alluvial plains while to the west the surface gradually rises, giving way to undulating country, interspersed with rocky hillocks.

Centre of the historic Mallabhum (Malla kingdom) of western Bengal, Bankura and its surrounding regions are identified with its historical and cultural significance for the later Middle Ages. Vaishnavism, which gained the status of state religion in the Malla kingdom in the seventeenth century, shaped the culture of the region. The Malla kingdom was annexed by the British East India Company in 1765 and the modern Bankura district took its form in 1881 and was named after its headquarters.

== Etymology ==
There are few accepted opinions about the etymology of the word Bankura. In The Origin and Development of the Bengali Language (1926, Vol. I, p. 66, §42), Suniti Kumar Chatterji identifies Bankura among several Bengali place-names exhibiting the suffix -rā/-ṛā, which he suggests may derive partly from Dravidian vāḍa. However, he also proposes Old Indo-Aryan vṛta-ka as a possible alternative and draws attention to the Kol-Munda word orak, meaning “house.” His discussion therefore leaves the linguistic origin of the suffix unresolved.

Other explanations derive the name from local historical and religious traditions. One associates it with Bā̃kuṛā Rāẏ, an epithet of the infuential regional deity Dharmathakur, while another attributes it to a founder-chieftain named Banku Rai. A further hypothesis connects the name with Bankunda, interpreted as “five tanks,” a form mentioned in older genealogical traditions. Popular etymologies have also associated the name with Bengali bā̃kā, meaning “crooked” or “winding,” and bā̃ku, interpreted as “beautiful” or “worthy of veneration,” although these interpretations remain unsubstantiated.

According to local tradition, the town, the headquarters of the district, was named after its founder, a chieftain named Banku Rai. Another legend has the town named after Bir Bankura, one of the twenty-two sons of Bir Hambir, the Raja of Bishnupur. He divided his kingdom into twenty-two tarafs or circles and gave one to each son. Taraf Jaybelia fell to the lot of Bir Bankura. He developed the town that bears the name Bankura. It has also been suggested that the name is a corruption of the word Bankunda, meaning five tanks. The name Bacoonda is found in old official records.

== History ==
The earliest signs of human habitation in the area are at Dihar—by about 1000 BC chalcolithic people had settled on the north bank of the Dwarakeswar. Bankura district was inhabited by various indigenous tribes in later pre-historic times as well as Aryanised or assimilated with the people and culture of the Indo-Aryan group, who prevailed in northern India, substantially later than rest of Bengal. These developments took place over many centuries through both conflict and cordiality.

The district was part of Rarh in ancient times. In the old Jain book Acaranga Sutra (around 4th century) there is mention of Sumha and Ladha (Rarh?) and there too the reference is to an area inhabited by uncivilised and barbaric people.

In the fourth century, Susunia edicts record in Prakrit and Sanskrit that Chandravarman, son of Simhavarman, was the ruler of Pushkarana (modern Pakhanna in Bankura district). According to the inscription on the Allahabad pillar, Chandravarman was defeated by Samudragupta and the area became a part of the Gupta Empire. The area was for many years part of Dandabhukti and Bardhamanbhukti.

Many historians opine that assimilation with Indo-Aryans took place first in northern and eastern Bengal and then in western Bengal. This has also been the broad course of the spread of Buddhism and Jainism in Bengal. There is ample evidence of pre-eminence of Indo-Aryan religion and culture in West Bengal from around the sixth century.

=== Bishnupur kingdom ===
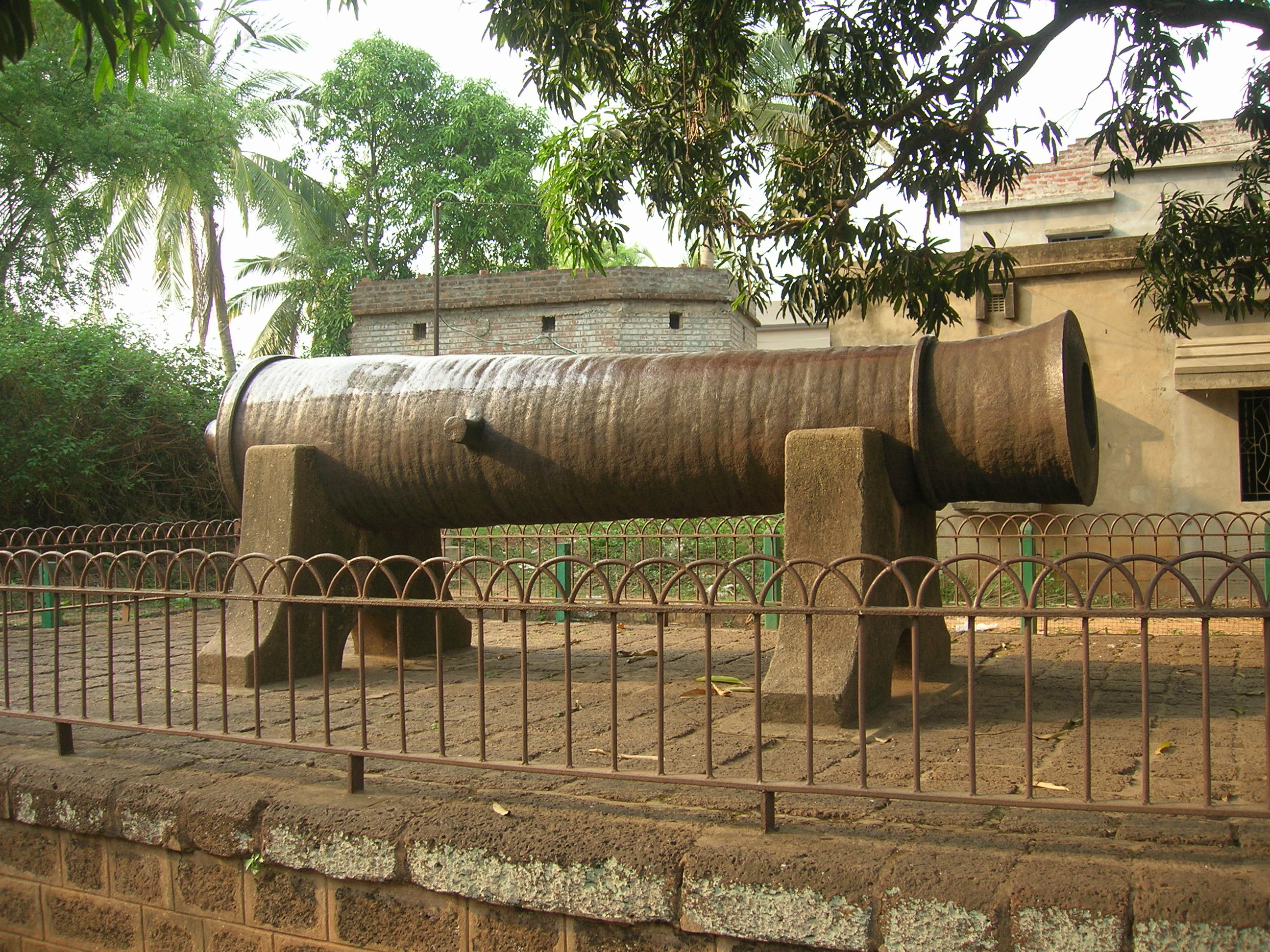
Dalmadal Cannon at Bishnupur, commissioned by the Malla kings

From around the seventh century until around the advent of British rule, for around a millennium, the history of Bankura district is identical with the rise and fall of the Hindu Rajas of Bishnupur. The area around Bishnupur was called Mallabhum. At its farthest extent Bishnupur kingdom stretched from Damin-i-koh in Santhal Parganas to Midnapore and included parts of Bardhaman and Chota Nagpur Plateau. Smaller kingdoms of aboriginal tribes, such as Dhalbhum, Tungbhum, Samantabhum and Varahabhumi or Varabhumi were gradually subdued and overshadowed by the Malla kings of Bishnupur.

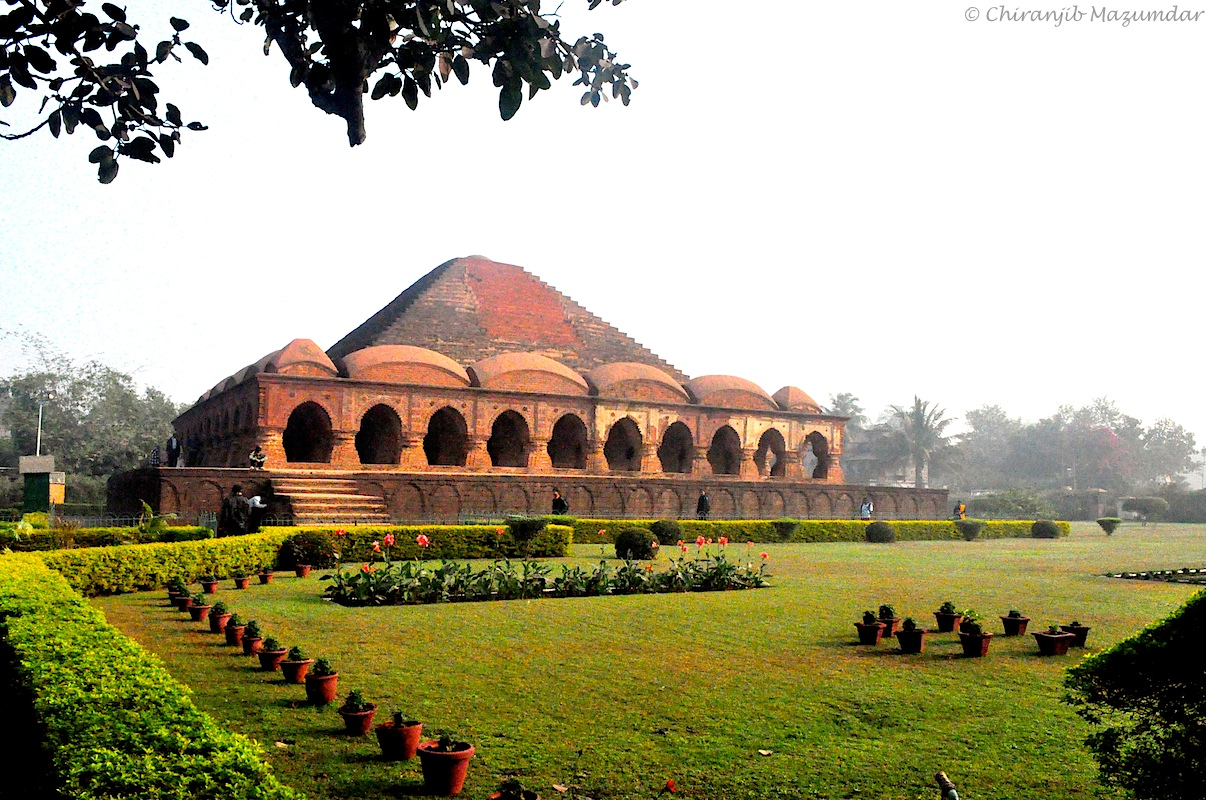
Bishnupur Rashmancha

Adi Malla (born 695 AD), the founder of the Malla dynasty, ruled in Laugram, 8.4 kilometres (5.2 mi) from Kotulpur, for 33 years. When he was 15 years old he had no equal as a wrestler in the territory all around. It was this that earned him the sobriquet of Adi Malla, the original or unique wrestler. He was also known as Bagdi Raja and was succeeded by his son, Jay Malla, who extended his domains and shifted his capital to Bishnupur. The subsequent kings steadily extended their kingdom. Among the more renowned are: Kalu Malla, Kau Malla, Jhau Malla, and Sur Malla.

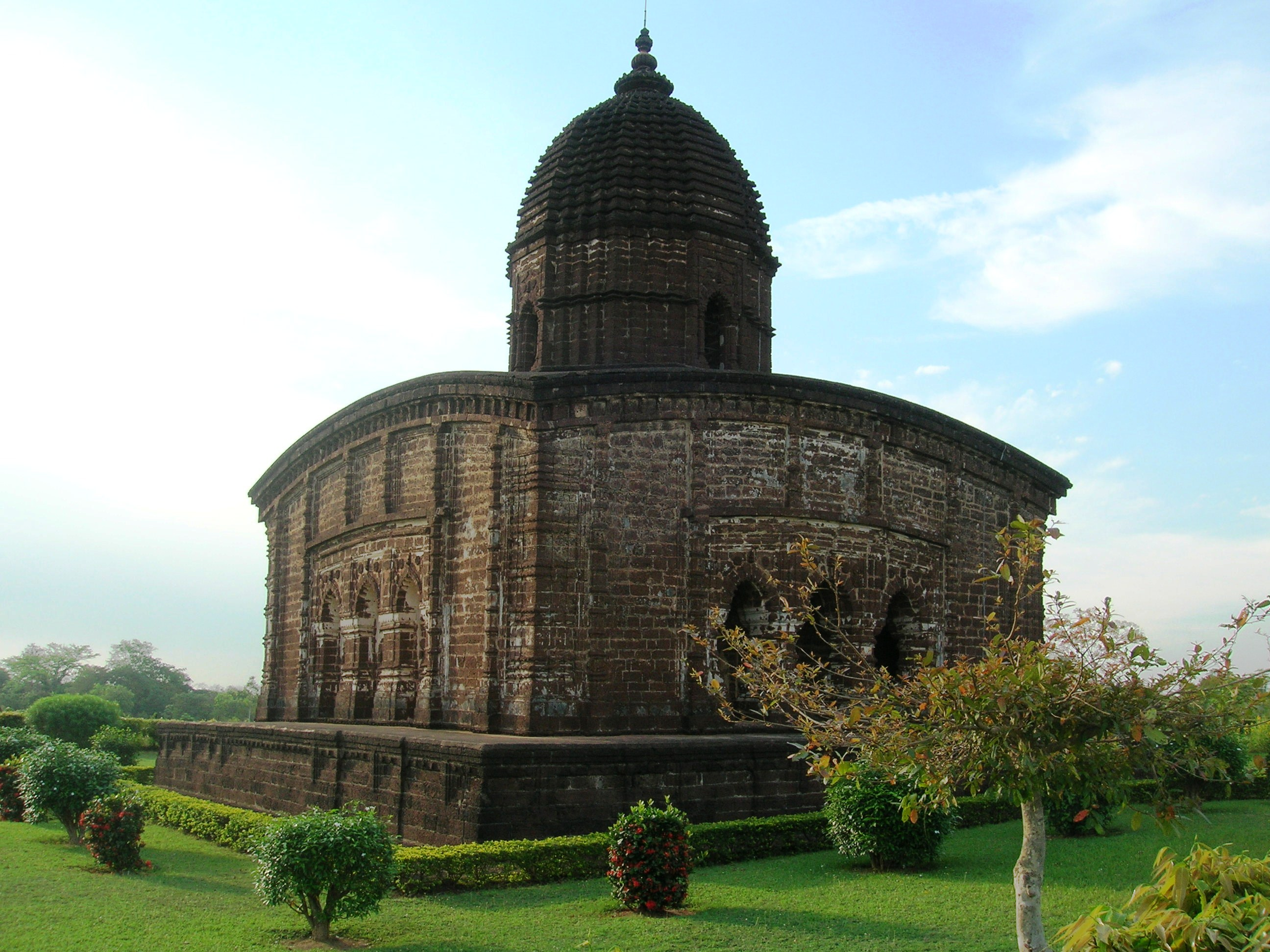
Jor Mandir complex (c. 1726), Bishnupur

Bir Hambir, the 49th ruler of the Malla dynasty who flourished around 1586 and ruled in the 16th-17th century, was a contemporary of the Mughal emperor Akbar. He was involved on the side of Mughals in their struggle against the Afghans and is mentioned by Muslim historians. He paid an annual tribute to the Muslim viceroys of Bengal and thus acknowledged their suzerainty. He was converted to Vaishnavism by Srinivasa and introduced the worship of Madan Mohan in Bishnupur.

Raghunath Singha Dev, who followed Bir Hambir, was the first Bishnupur Raja to use the Kshatriya title Singh. With exquisite palaces and temples built during the period that followed Bishnupur was reputed to be the most renowned city in the world, more beautiful than the house of Indra in heaven. However, it has also been recorded that while these royal patrons of Hindu art and religion were busy building temples they had lost much of their independence and sunk to the position of tributary princes. Bir Singh walled up alive all his sons, eighteen in number. The youngest, Durjan, alone escaped, having been kept in hiding by the servants. The status of the Raja of Bishnupur was that of a tributary prince, exempted from personal attendance at the court at Murshidabad, and represented there by a resident.

=== Maratha raids ===
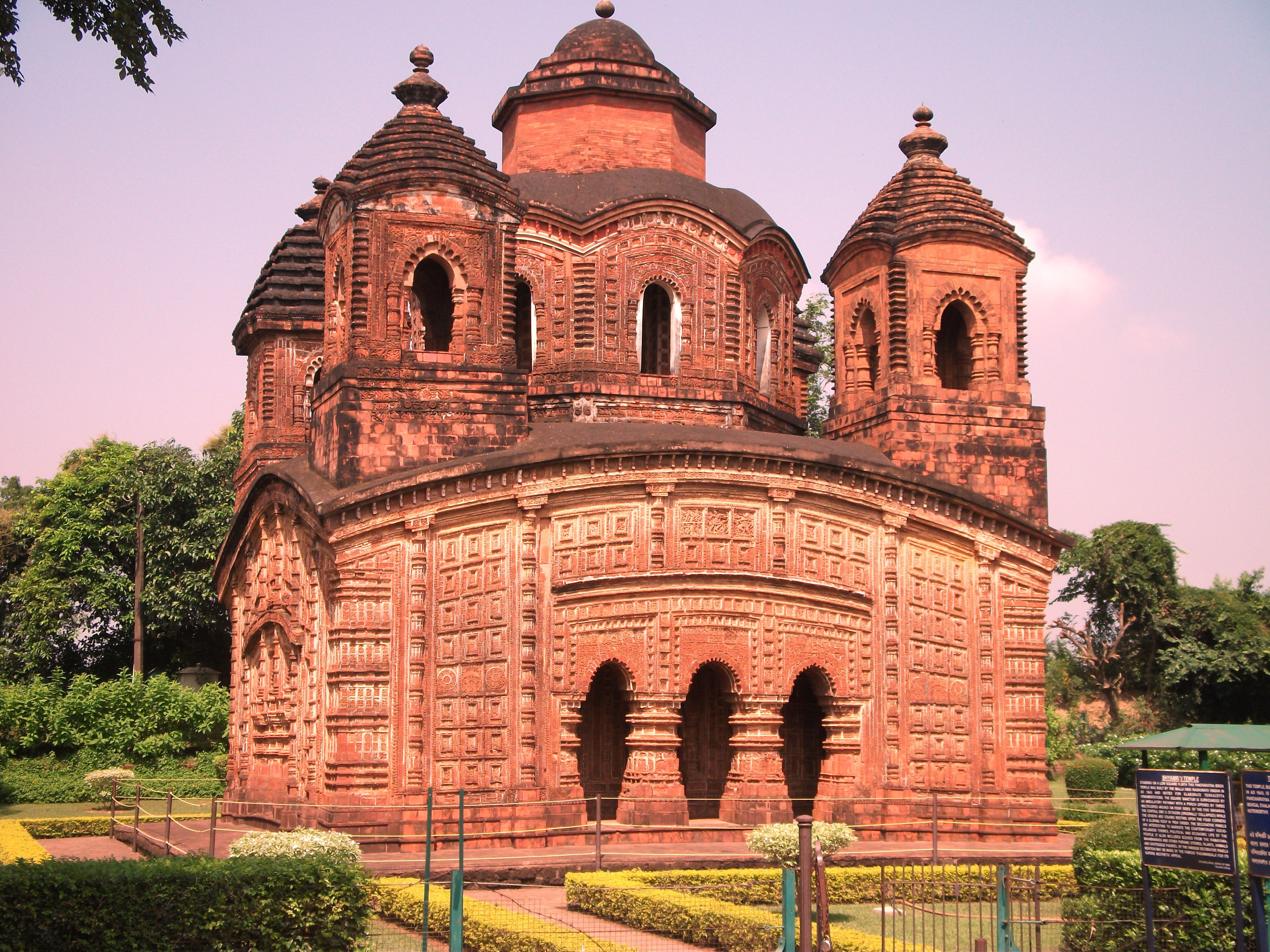
Shyam Rai Temple

The Bishnupur Rajas who were at the summit of their fortunes towards the end of the 17th century, started declining in the first half of the 18th century. First, the Maharaja of Burdwan seized the Fatehpur Mahal, and then the Maratha invasions laid waste their country. In 1742, when the Marathas, under Bhaskar Rao, attacked Bishnupur, the troops put up a spirited defence but then Gopal Singh retreated within the fort and ordered the troops and citizens to pray to Madan Mohan to save the city. It is believed that Madan Mohan responded and the cannons were fired without human assistance. The truth probably is that the Maratha cavalry were unable to pierce the strong fortifications and retired. While they failed to take the fort and pillage the treasury, the Marathas harried the less protected parts of the kingdom. Intrigue and litigation that followed ruined the Bishnupur Raj family and eventually in 1806, the estate was sold for arrears of land revenue and bought up by the Maharaja of Burdwan.

=== British administration ===
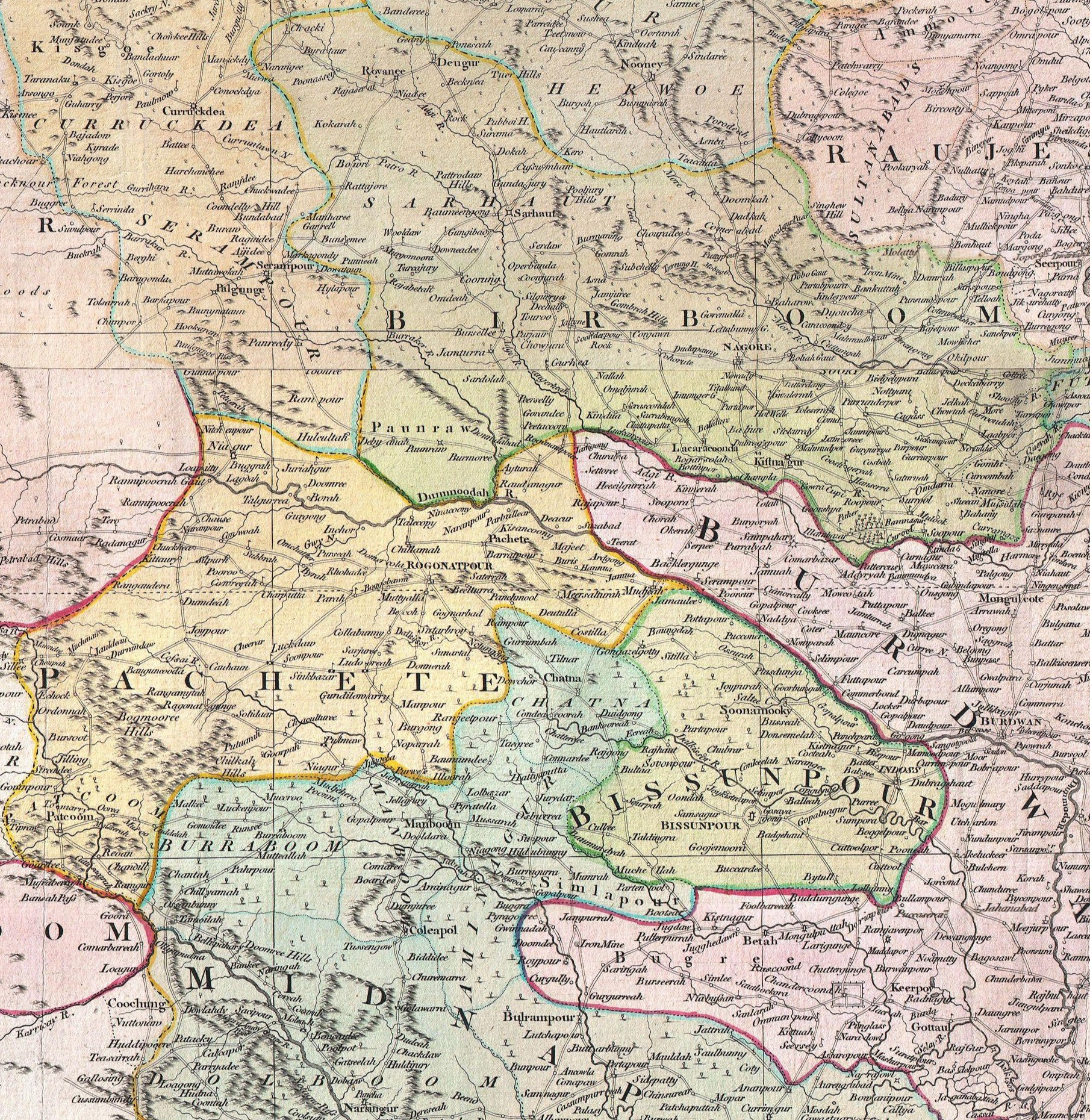
Birbhum and Bishnupur districts from 1765 to 1787, based on the 1776 map by James Rennell. These areas have since become part of the Birbhum and Bankura districts.

Bishnupur was ceded to the British with the rest of Burdwan chakla in 1760. The Marathas had laid the country waste and famine of 1770 completed the misery of the kingdom. A large section of the population was swept away, cultivation fell, and lawlessness spread. The once powerful king had been reduced to the status of a mere zamindar. In 1787, Bishnupur was united with Birbhum to form a separate administrative unit, the headquarters was shifted to Suri, and a rebellious situation prevailed. Bankura continued to be one district with Birbhum till 1793, when it was transferred to the Burdwan collectorate.

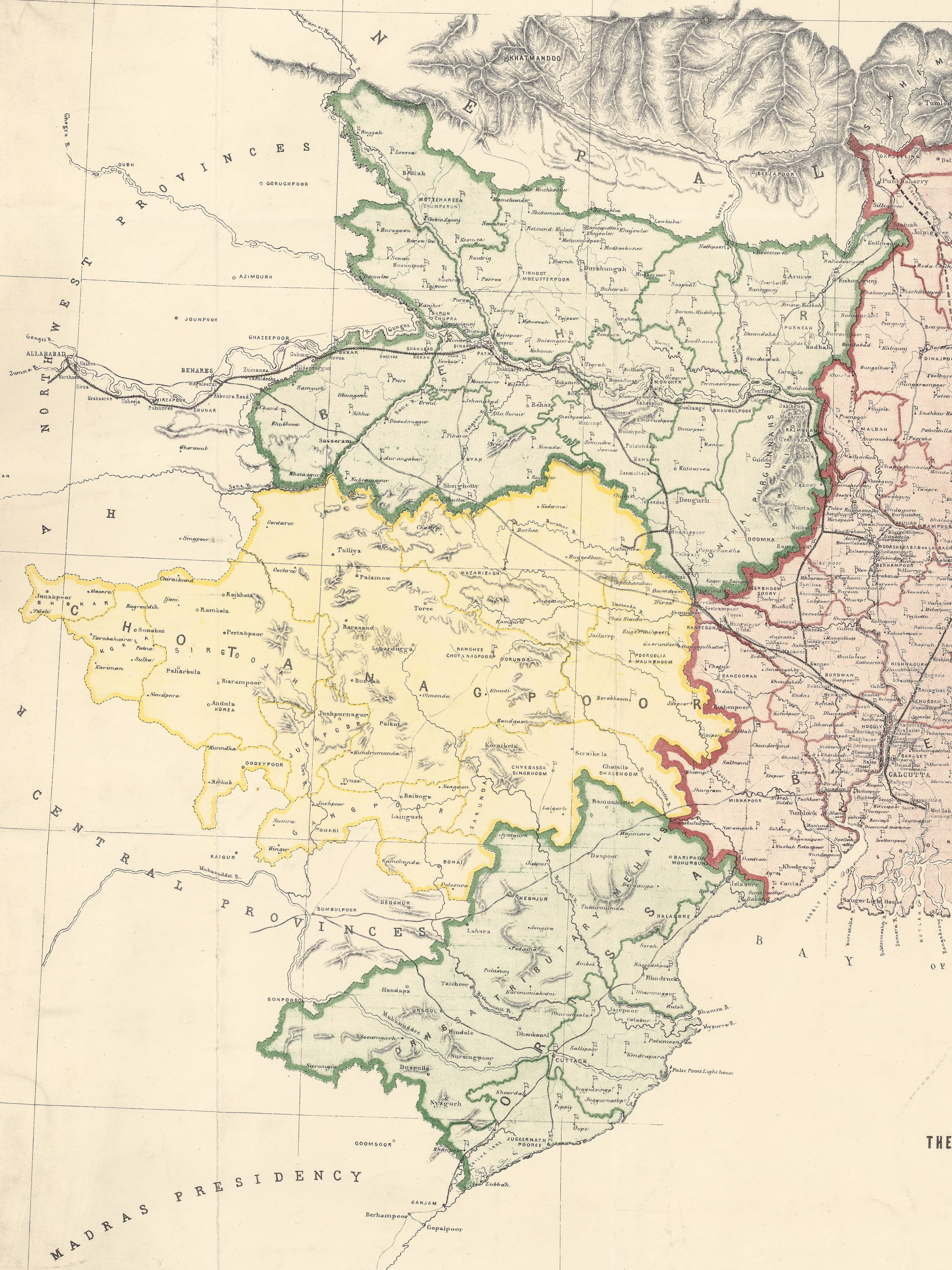
Bankura District as part of the Burdwan Division, Bengal Presidency, 1872

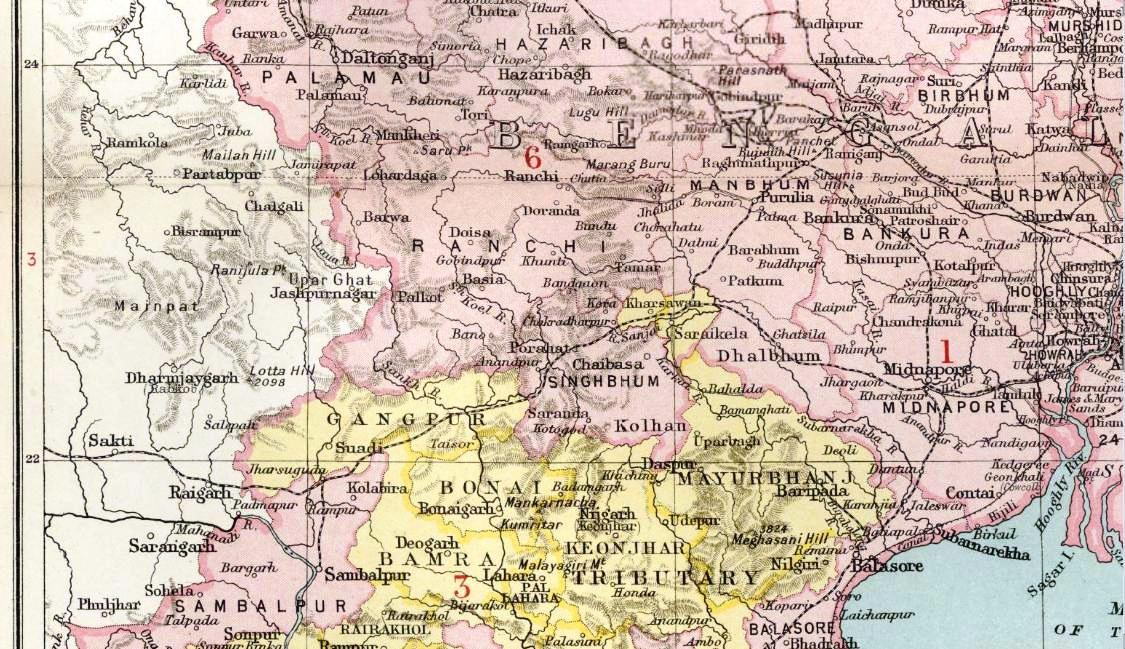
Present-day Bankura district area in 1907 map of Bengal Presidency

Towards the end of the 18th century, certain portions of the district around Raipur was affected by the Chuar Rebellion. At the time Bankura appears to have been part of Jungle Mahals. The disturbances of the Chuars in 1832 in the western part of the Bishnupur district lead to the disbandment of the Jungle Mahals. In 1833 Bishnupur was transferred to Burdwan. In 1872, the parganas of Sonamukhi, Indas, Kotulpur, Shergarh and Senpahari were transferred from Manbhum to Burdwan. At that time Bankura has area of 1,346 square miles (3,490 km^{2}) with 526,772 inhabitants. In 1879, the district acquired its present shape with the thanas of Khatra and Raipur and the outpost of Simplapal being transferred from Manbhum, and the thanas of Sonamukhi, Kotulpur and Indas being retransferred from Burdwan. Addition of those areas into Bankura district increased to 2,621 square miles (6,790 km^{2}) with 1,116,411 inhabitants in 1901. However, it was known for sometime as West Burdwan and in 1881 came to be known as Bankura district.

=== Post-independence ===
The district is part of the Red Corridor.

== Geography ==
Map of Bankura District showing CD blocks and municipalitys

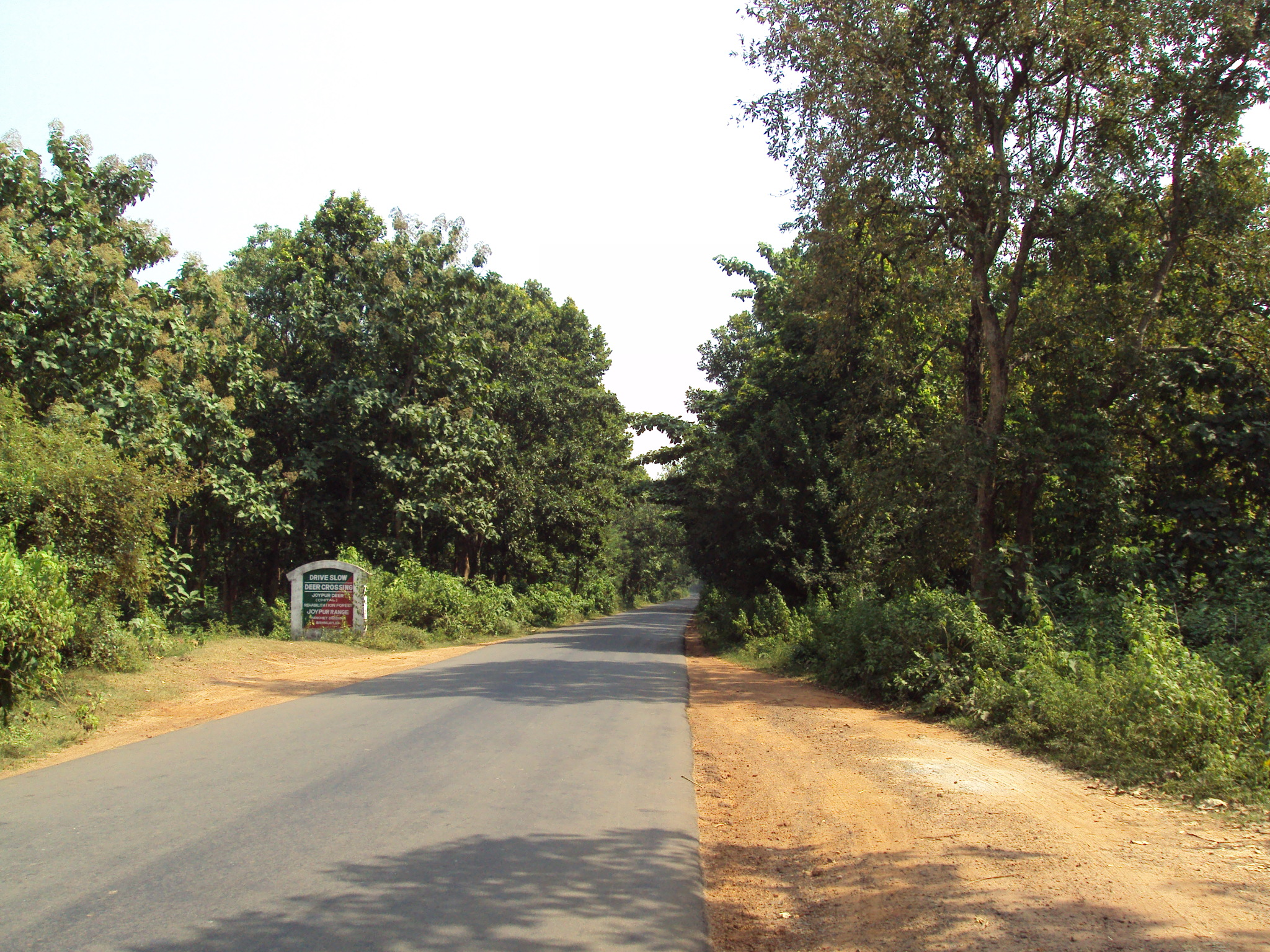
Dense forest in Joypur Jungle

Bankura district is a part of Medinipur division. It is situated between 22° 38’ and 23° 38’ north latitude and between 86° 36’ and 87° 46’ east longitude. It has an area of 6,882 square kilometres (2,657 sq mi). On the north and north-east the district is bounded by Bardhaman district, from which it is separated mostly by the Damodar River. On the south-east it is bounded by Hooghly district, on the south by Paschim Medinipur district and on the west by Purulia district. Bankura district has been described as the "connecting link between the plains of Bengal on the east and Chota Nagpur Plateau on the west." The areas to the east and north-east are low-lying alluvial plains, similar to predominating rice lands of Bengal. To the west the surface gradually rises, giving way to undulating country, interspersed with rocky hillocks. Much of the country is covered with jungles.

The western part of the district has poor, ferruginous soil and hard beds of laterite with scrub jungles and sal woods. Long broken ridges with irregular patches of more recent alluvium have marks of seasonal cultivation. During the long dry season large extents of red soil with hardly any trees lend the country a scorched and dreary appearance. In the eastern part the eye constantly rests on wide expanses of rice fields, green in the rains but parched and dry in summer.

The Gondwana system is represented in the northern portion of the district, south of the Damodar, between Mejia and Biharinath Hill. The beds covered with alluvium contains seams of coal belonging to the Raniganj system.

=== Hills ===
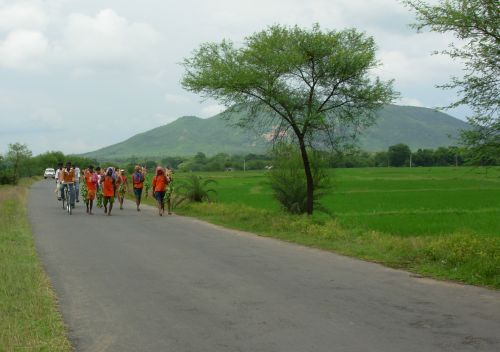
Susunia hills

The hills of the district consist of outliers of the Chota Nagpur plateau and only two are of any great height – Biharinath and Susunia. While the former rises to a height of 448 metres (1,470 ft), the latter attains a height of 440 metres (1,440 ft).

=== Rivers ===
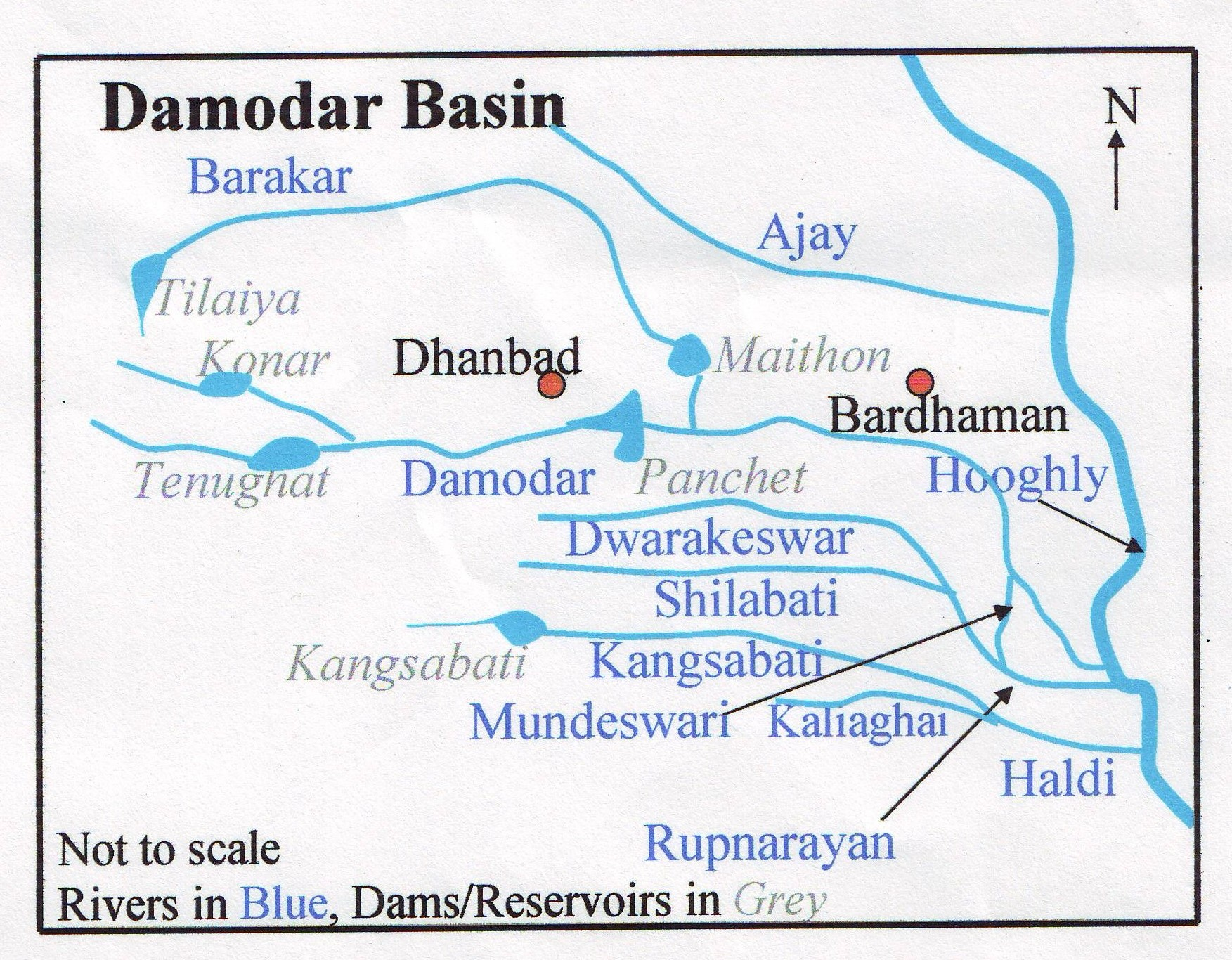
List of Rivers

The rivers of the area flow from the north-east to the south-west in courses roughly parallel to one another. They are mostly hill streams, originating in the hills in the west. The rivers come down in floods after heavy rains and subside as rapidly as they rise. In summer, their sand beds are almost always dry. The principal rivers are: Damodar, Dwarakeswar, Shilabati, Kangsabati, Sali, Gandheswari, Kukhra, Birai, Jaypanda and Bhairabbanki. There are some small waterfalls along the course of the Shilabati near Harmasra, and along the course of the Kangsabati in the Raipur area.

Kangsabati Project was started during the second five-year plan period (1956–1961). The dam across the Kangsabati has a length of 10,098 metres (33,130 ft) and a height of 38 metres (125 ft).

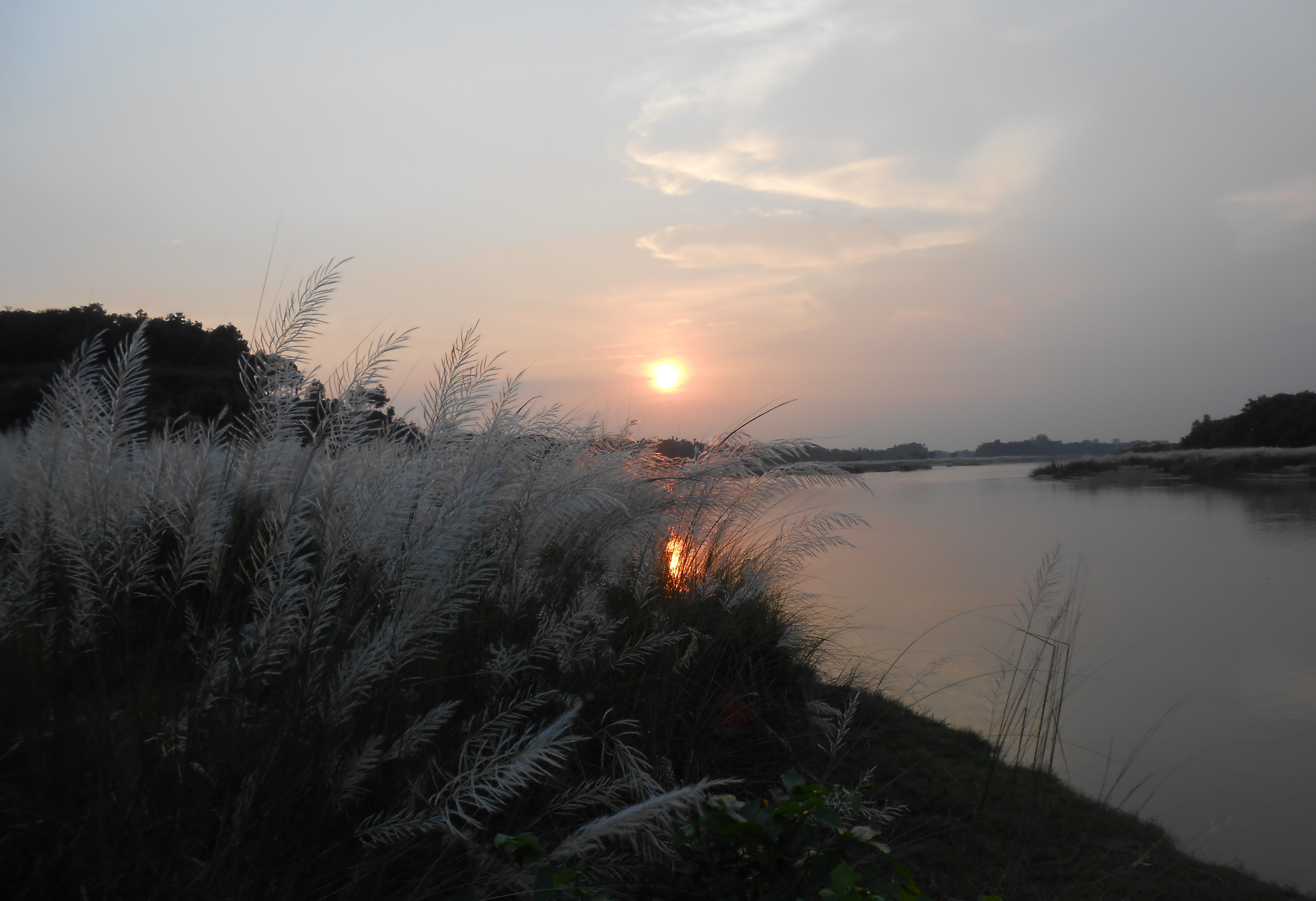
Sunset on the Shilabati river banks

=== Climate ===
The climate, especially in the upland tracts to the west, is much drier than in eastern or southern Bengal. From the beginning of March to early June, hot westerly winds prevail, the thermometer in the shade rising to around 45 °C (113 °F). The monsoon months, June to September, are comparatively pleasant. The total average rainfall is 1,400 millimetres (55 in), the bulk of the rain coming in the months of June to September. Winters are pleasant with temperatures dropping down to below 12 °C (54 °F) in December.

== Economy ==
Bankura is economically underdeveloped and is mostly dependent on agriculture. Almost 70% of the district's income is generated through agriculture where 80% of the farmers are small & marginal in nature. Bankura is one of the most draught prone district of West Bengal. However due to protective irrigation system, land reforms and use of high fertile & hybrid crops the economic condition of the district has improved. Also, cottage and small-scale industries, such as Stone-crushing, Weaving, Oilseed-crushing, handicraft units like Dokra, Terra-cotta, Baluchari Sari play a key economic role in district.

In 2006, the Ministry of Panchayati Raj named Bankura one of the country's 250 most backward districts (out of a total of 640). It is one of the nineteen districts in West Bengal currently receiving funds from the Backward Regions Grant Fund Programme (BRGF).

== Divisions ==
=== Administrative divisions ===
The district comprises three subdivisions: Bankura Sadar, Khatra and Bishnupur. Bankura Sadar subdivision consists of Bankura municipality and eight community development blocks: Bankura I, Bankura II, Barjora, Chhatna, Gangajalghati, Mejia, Onda and Saltora. Khatra subdivision consists of eight community development blocs: Indpur, Khatra, Hirbandh, Raipur, Sarenga, Ranibandh, Simlapal and Taldangra. Bishnupur subdivision consists of Bishnupur and Sonamukhi municipalities and six community development blocks: Indas, Joypur, Patrasayer, Kotulpur, Sonamukhi and Bishnupur.

Bankura is the district headquarters. There are 21 police stations, 22 development blocks, 3 municipalities, 190 gram panchayats and 5187 villages in this district.

Other than municipality area, each subdivision contains community development blocs which in turn are divided into rural areas and census towns. In total there are 5 urban units: 3 municipalities and 2 census towns.

Bankura district is divided into the following administrative subdivisions:

Subdivision	Headquarters	Area km^{2}	Population (2011)	Rural Population % (2001)	Urban Population % (2001)
Bankura Sadar	Bankura	2596.11	1,439,148	89.27	11.43
Khatra	Khatra	2407.49	1,045,591	100.00	0
Bishnupur	Bishnupur	1870.75	1,111,935	91.04	8.96
Bankura district	Bankura	6882.00	3,596,674	92.63	7.37

=== Assembly constituencies ===
As per order of the Delimitation Commission in respect of the delimitation of constituencies in the West Bengal, the district is divided into 12 assembly constituencies:

No.	Name	Lok Sabha Constituency	MLA	2021 Winner	2024 Lead
247	Saltora (SC)	Bankura	Chandana Bauri	Bharatiya Janata Party	Trinamool Congress
248	Chhatna	Bankura	Satyanarayan Mukhopadhyay	Bharatiya Janata Party	Trinamool Congress
249	Ranibandh (ST)	Bankura	Jyotsna Mandi	Trinamool Congress	Trinamool Congress
250	Raipur (ST)	Bankura	Mrityunjoy Murmu	Trinamool Congress	Trinamool Congress
251	Taldangra	Bankura	Falguni Singhababu	Trinamool Congress	Trinamool Congress
252	Bankura	Bankura	Niladri Sekhar Dana	Bharatiya Janata Party	Bharatiya Janata Party
253	Barjora	Bishnupur	Alok Mukherjee	Trinamool Congress	Bharatiya Janata Party
254	Onda	Bishnupur	Amarnath Shakha	Bharatiya Janata Party	Bharatiya Janata Party
255	Bishnupur	Bishnupur	Tanmay Ghosh (Note: Tanmay Ghosh was elected as a BJP MLA. However, on 30 August 2021, he defected to the Trinamool Congress)	Trinamool Congress	Bharatiya Janata Party
256	Katulpur (SC)	Bishnupur	Harakali Protiher (Note: Harakali Protiher was elected as a BJP MLA. However, on 27 October 2023, he defected to the Trinamool Congress)	Trinamool Congress	Bharatiya Janata Party
257	Indas (SC)	Bishnupur	Nirmal Kumar Dhara	Bharatiya Janata Party	Trinamool Congress
258	Sonamukhi (SC)	Bishnupur	Dibakar Gharami	Bharatiya Janata Party	Bharatiya Janata Party

Raipur and Ranibandh constituencies are reserved for Scheduled Tribes (ST) candidates. Saltora, Katulpur, Indas and Sonamukhi constituencies will be reserved for Scheduled Castes (SC) candidates. Saltora, Chhatna, Ranibandh, Raipur, Taldangra, and Bankura constituencies will be part of Bankura (Lok Sabha constituency), which will also contain one assembly segment from Purulia district. Barjora, Onda, Bishnupur, Katulpur, Indas and Sonamukhi will be assembly segments of Bishnupur (Lok Sabha constituency), which also contains one assembly segments from Bardhaman district.

== Demographics ==
Historical population
Year	Pop.	±%
1901	1,116,411	—
1911	1,138,670	+2.0%
1921	1,019,941	−10.4%
1931	1,111,721	+9.0%
1941	1,289,640	+16.0%
1951	1,319,259	+2.3%
1961	1,664,513	+26.2%
1971	2,031,039	+22.0%
1981	2,374,815	+16.9%
1991	2,805,065	+18.1%
2001	3,192,695	+13.8%
2011	3,596,674	+12.7%
Source: Census of India

According to the 2011 census Bankura district has a population of 3,596,674, roughly equal to the nation of Lithuania or the US state of Connecticut. This gives it a ranking of 80th in India (out of a total of 739). The district has a population density of 523 inhabitants per square kilometre (1,350/sq mi). Its population growth rate over the decade 2001-2011 was 12.64%. Bankura has a sex ratio of 954 females for every 1000 males, and a literacy rate of 70.95%. 8.33% of the population lives in urban areas. Scheduled Castes and Scheduled Tribes collectively account for 42.9% (SC: 32.65% and ST: 10.25%) of the district's total population. The prominent communities in this group, in terms of the district's total population, are Bauri (9.74%), Santal (8.31%), Bagdi/Duley (8.02%), Lohar (3.18%), Sunri (excluding Saha) (2.48%), Khaira (2.2%), Mal (1.1%), Bhumij (1.09%), Chamar (1.05%), Dom (1.03%), Namasudra (0.76%), Jalia Kaibartta (0.57%), Hari (0.53%), Kora (0.37%), and Bhuiya (0.34%). Additionally, populations ranging between ten thousand to one hundred include Keot, Mallah, Savar, Bhogta, Mahar, Lodha/Kharia, Kaora, Mahali, Munda, Kotal, Rajwar, Karenga/Koranga, and Bedia. Yadavs Total - 10% population in Bankura District Sadgop - 4% & Gawala- 6% In the 2001 census, Bankura district had a total population of 3,191,822 of which 1,634,561 were males and 1,557,261 were females. Decadal growth for the period 1991-2001 was 13.79% in Bankura district against 17.84% in West Bengal. The urban population was 235,264 against a rural population of 2,956,558. The district had a density of population of 464 persons per km^{2}. Bankura had a literacy rate of 63.84 per cent.

The first census was taken in 1872. The district as now constituted had a population of 968,597. In the 1901 census, 90.7 per cent of the population spoke a dialect of Bengali known as Rarhi Boli, which was also spoken in the adjoining districts. Santali was spoken by about 9 per cent of the population. 87.4 per cent of the population were Hindus, 8 per cent were Animists and 5.6 per cent were Muslims.

=== Religion ===
Religions in Bankura district (2011)
Religion	Percent
Hinduism	84.34%
Islam	8.08%
Other (tribal religion)	7.25%
Other or not stated	0.33%

Religion	Population (1941)	Percentage (1941)	Population (2011)	Percentage (2011)
Hinduism	1,078,559	83.63%	3,033,581	84.34%
Tribal religion (Note: All tribals were counted under 'Tribal' in the 1941 census irrespective of actual religion practiced.)	154,246	11.96%	260,694	7.25%
Islam	55,564	4.31%	290,450	8.08%
Others (Note: Including Jainism, Christianity, Buddhism, Zoroastrianism, Judaism, Ad-Dharmis, or not stated)	1,271	0.10%	11,949	0.33%
Total Population	1,289,640	100%	3,596,674	100%

Hinduism is the predominant religion, and makes up nearly the entire population in urban areas. Islam is almost entirely to be found in rural areas, as are tribal religions. Muslims are most concentrated in the east of the district bordering Bardhaman and Hooghly districts, while tribal religions are largely in the south west, and form significant minorities in Ranibundh (39.44%) and Raipur (27.66%) CD blocks.

=== Language ===
Languages of Bankura district (2011)
1. Bengali (90.7%)
2. Santali (7.96%)
3. Other (1.87%)

According to the 2011 census, 90.68% of the population spoke Bengali and 7.96% Santali as their first language.

Most people, particularly in rural areas, speak the 'Bankri', a coarser form of the Central Bengali dialect.

== Culture ==
=== Places of interest ===
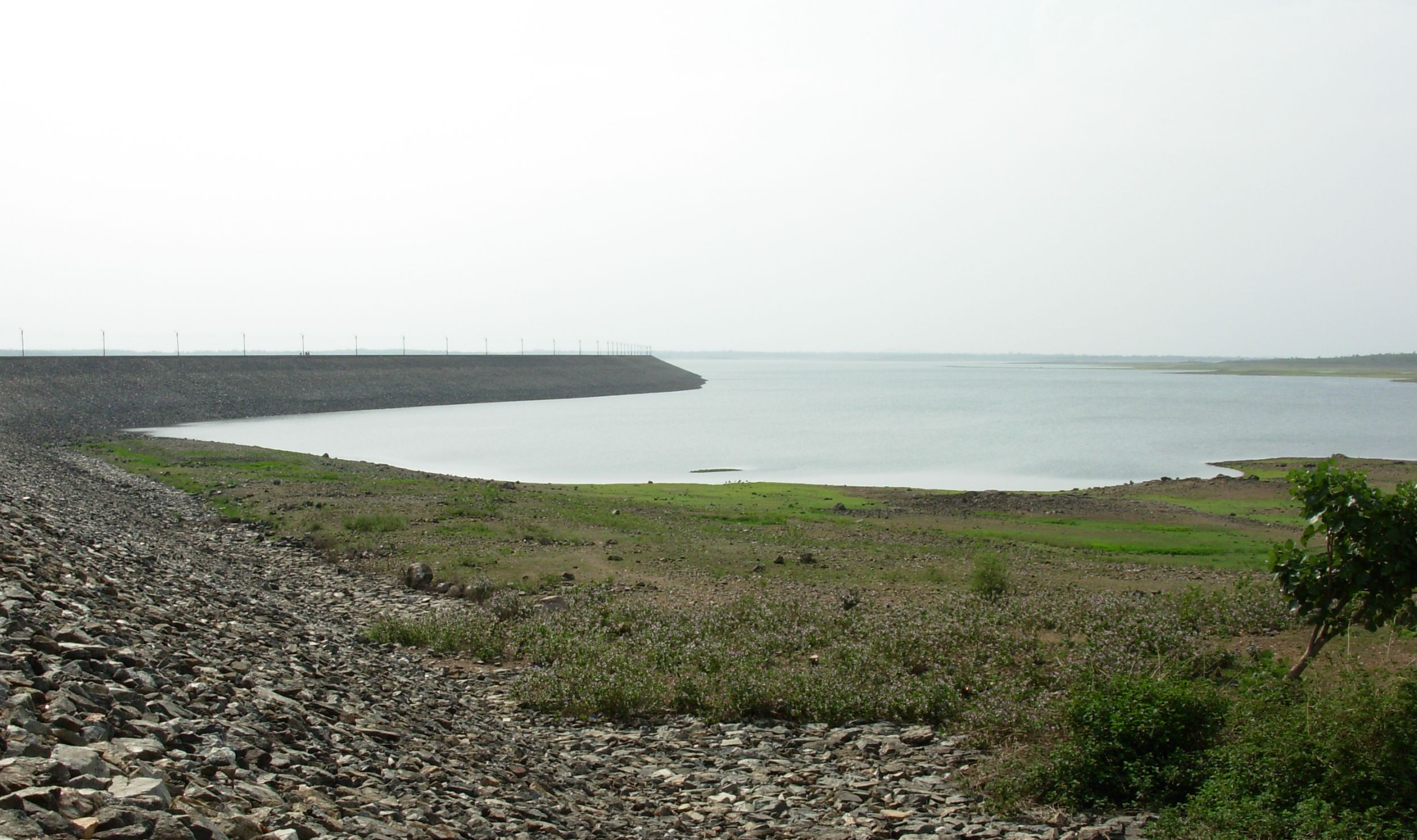
Mukutmanipur dam

Bankura is the headquarters of the district. Bishnupur (or Vishnupur) is a subdivisional town of Bankura district. It was the capital of the Mallabhum kingdom, once the most important Hindu dynasty in Bengal. This town famous for the Terracotta Temples made by the local red soils. This city often called as the 'Temple City' of Bengal.

In addition to Bishnupur, many towns and villages in Bankura such as Kotulpur, Joypur, Sonamukhi, Hadal Narayanpur, and Akui have brick terracotta temples built between the 17th and 19th centuries.

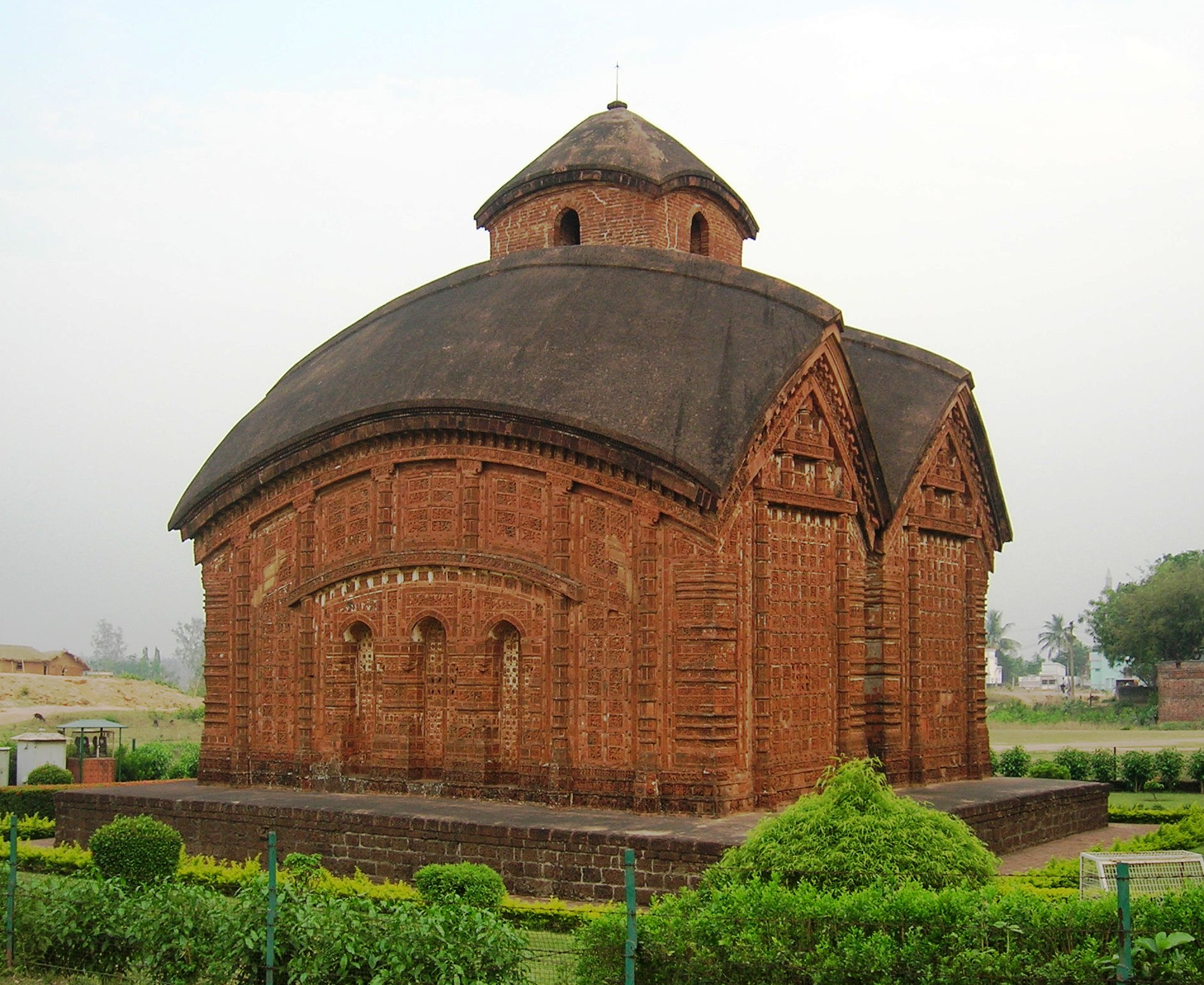
Jor Bangla Temple of 16 century in Bankura

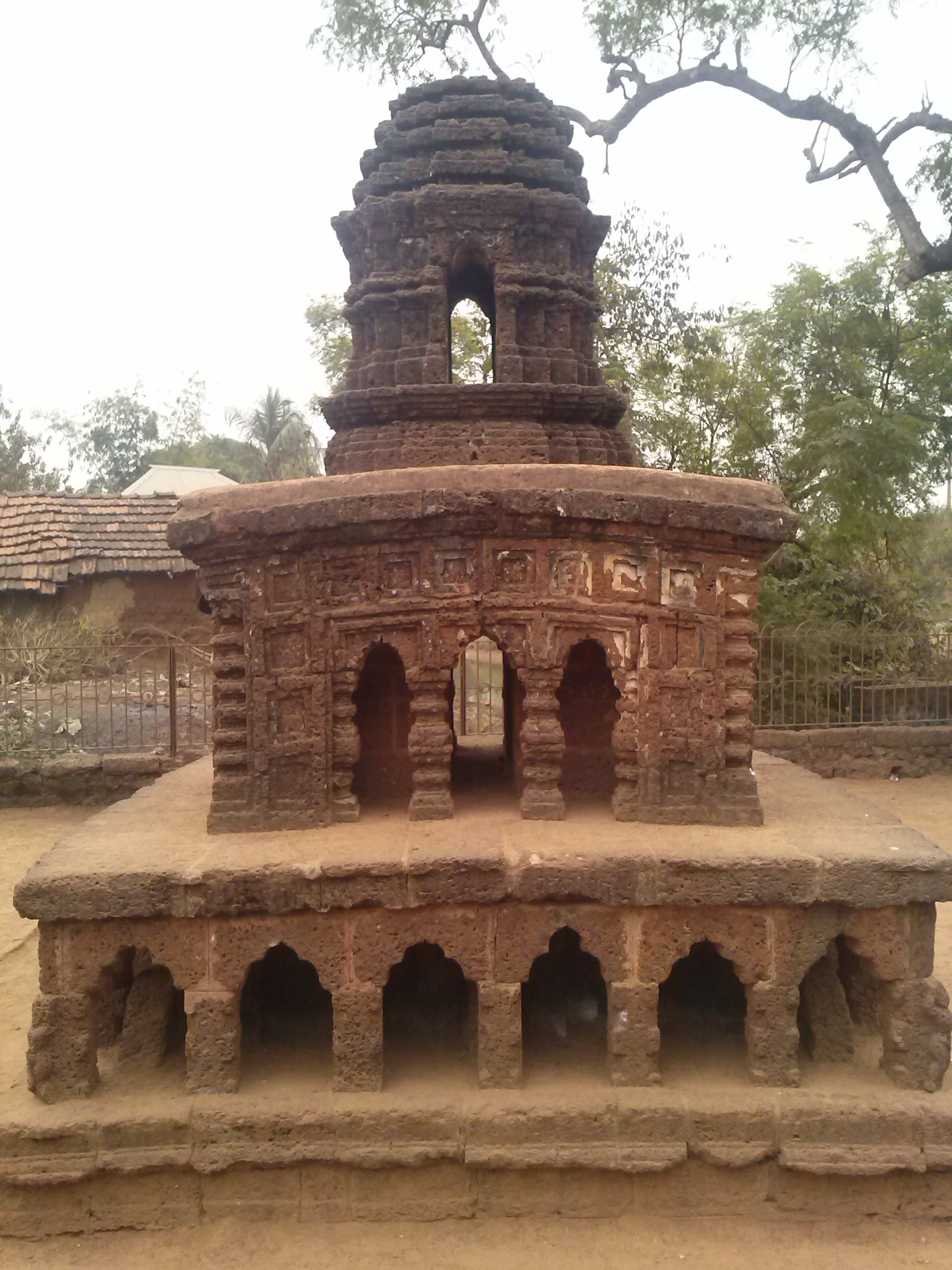
historic stone chariot of Bankura

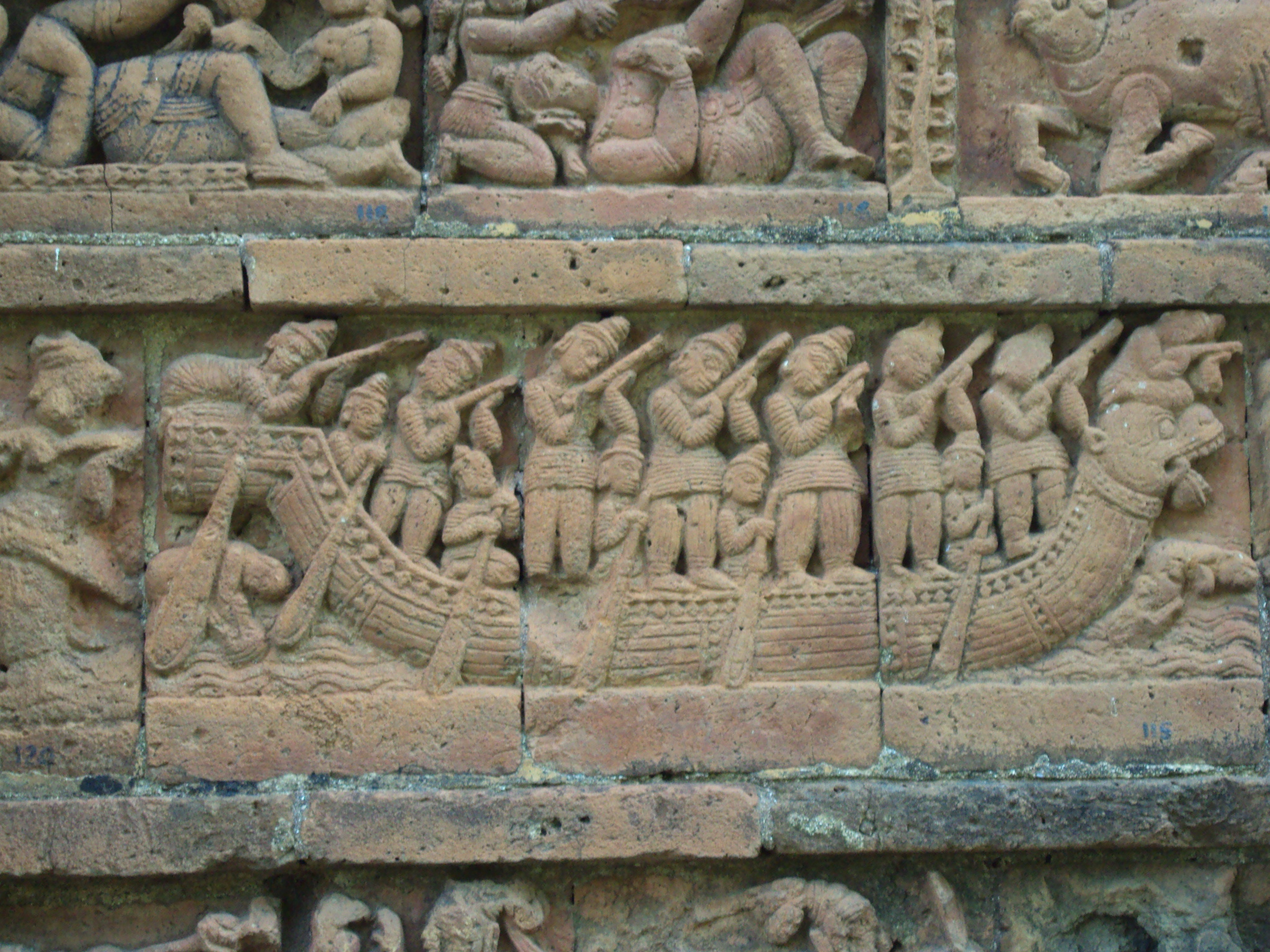
Terracotta relief of temple of Bankura

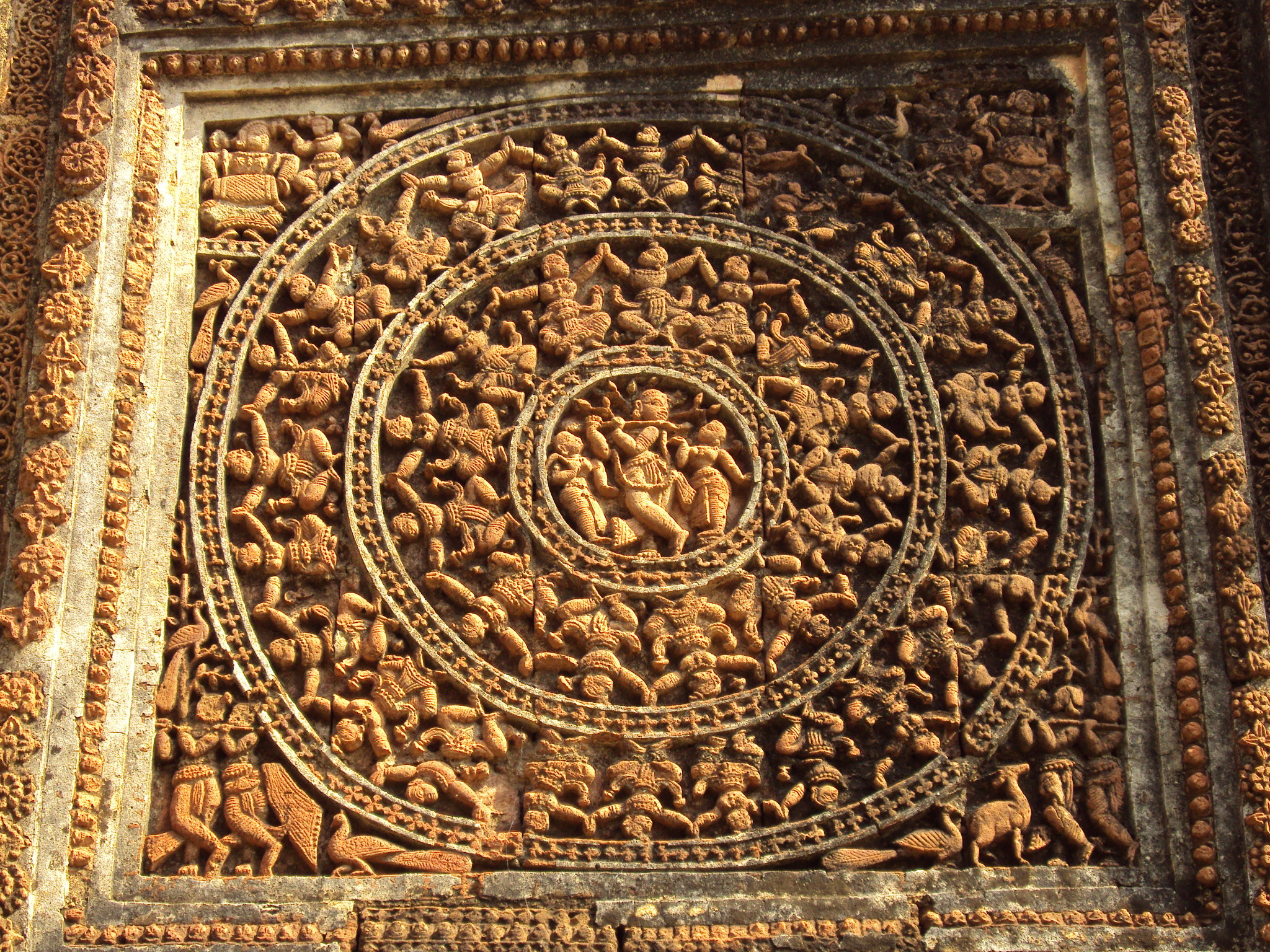
Terracotta motif

Terracotta temple and motif of Bankura

Susunia hills and Beharinath hills are located in the district. Mukutmanipur, the second largest earthen dam in India and Sutan are tourist spots. Mejia power plant is the only thermal power plant of this district. Darakeshwar, Gandheswari and Kangsabati are the major rivers flow through the district. Jaipur forest is the only forest in the plains of Southern Bengal. Bankura Sammilani Medical College is the oldest medical college in this area.

== Flora and fauna ==
The eastern portion of the district is a part of the rice plains of West Bengal. The land under rice cultivation contains marsh weeds of Gangetic plain. Around human habitations there are shrub species such as:

- Glycosmis,
- Polyalthia suberosa,
- Clerodendrum infortunatum,
- Solanum torvum and various other species of the same genus,
- Trema,
- Streblus and
- Ficus hispida.

The larger trees are:

- papal,
- banyan,
- red cotton tree (Bombax malabaricum),
- mango (Mangifera indica),
- jiyal (Lannea coromandelica),
- Phoenix dactylifera, and
- Borassus flabellifer.

Other plants found include:

- Jatropha gossypifolia,
- Urena,
- Heliotropium and
- Sida.

Forests or scrub jungles contain: *Wendlandia exserta,

- Gmelina arborea,
- Haldina cordifolia,
- Holarrhena antidysenterica,
- Wrightia tomentosa,
- Vitex negundo and
- Stephegyne parvifolia.

The western portion of the district is higher. The uplands are either bare or are covered with scrub jungle of Ziziphus and other thorny shrubs. This thorny forest gradually merges into sal (Shorea robusta) forest. Low hills are covered with Miliusa, Schleichera, Diospyros and other trees.

Some of the common trees of economic interest found in the district are:

- Alkushi (Mucuna pruriens),
- amaltas (Cassia fistula),
- asan (Terminalia tomentosa),
- babul (Acacia nilotica),
- bair (Ziziphus jujuba),
- bael (Aegle marmelos),
- bag bherenda (Jatropha curcas),
- bichuti (Tragia involucrate),
- bahera (Terminalia belerica),
- dhatura (Datura stramonium),
- dhaman (Cordia macleodii),
- gab (Diospyros embryopteris),
- harra (Terminalia chebula),
- imli (Tamarindus indica),
- kuchila (Strychnos nux-vomica),
- mahua (Bassia latifolia),
- palas (Butea frondosa),
- sajina (Moringa pterygosperma),
- kend (Diospyros melanoxylon),
- mango,
- date-palm,
- nim,
- papal,
- banyan,
- red cotton tree and
- jiyal.

== Education ==
Bankura district had a literacy rate of 70.26% as per the provisional figures of the census of India 2011. Bankura Sadar subdivision had a literacy rate of 69.56%, Khatra subdivision 69.79% and Bishnupur subdivision 71.60%.

Given in the table below (data in numbers) is a comprehensive picture of the education scenario in Bankura district for the year 2013-14. The primary schools include junior basic schools; middle schools, high schools and higher secondary schools include madrasahs; technical schools include junior technical schools, junior government polytechnics, industrial technical institutes, industrial training centres, nursing training institutes etc.; technical and professional colleges include engineering colleges, medical colleges, para-medical institutes, management colleges, teachers training and nursing training colleges, law colleges, art colleges, music colleges etc. Special and non-formal education centres include sishu siksha kendras, madhyamik siksha kendras, centres of Rabindra mukta vidyalaya, recognised Sanskrit tols, institutions for the blind and other handicapped persons, Anganwadi centres, reformatory schools etc.

Subdivision	Primary School		Middle School		High School		Higher Secondary School		General College, Univ		Technical / Professional Instt		Non-formal Education	
Subdivision	Institution	Student	Institution	Student	Institution	Student	Institution	Student	Institution	Student	Institution	Student	Institution	Student
Bankura Sadar	1,371	117,820	144	17,951	90	69,329	91	78,909	9	14,782	14	2,865	2,228	69,919
Khatra	1,200	86,786	113	16,805	50	28,178	112	93,919	6	13,067	6	702	1,993	51,849
Bishnupur	979	86,750	112	15,092	57	28,738	81	78,915	6	10,552	14	4,170	1,649	57,769
Bankura district	3,550	291,356	369	49,848	197	126,245	284	251,743	21	38,401	34	7,737	5,870	179,537

== Health care ==
The table below (all data in numbers) presents an overview of the medical facilities available and patients treated in the hospitals, health centres and sub-centres in 2014 in Bankura district.

Subdivision	Health & Family Welfare Deptt, WB				Other State Govt Deptts	Local bodies	Central Govt Deptts / PSUs	NGO / Private Nursing Homes	Total	Total Number of Beds	Total Number of Doctors	Indoor Patients	Outdoor Patients
Subdivision	Hospitals	Rural Hospitals	Block Primary Health Centres	Primary Health Centres	Other State Govt Deptts	Local bodies	Central Govt Deptts / PSUs	NGO / Private Nursing Homes	Total	Total Number of Beds	Total Number of Doctors	Indoor Patients	Outdoor Patients
Bankura Sadar	2	6	2	25	3	-	2	31	71	2,628	320	147,890	2,634,248
Khatra	1	7	1	21	-	-	-	4	34	698	77	58,258	1,440,172
Bishnupur	1	5	1	23	-	-	-	11	41	698	77	68,068	1,351,349
Bankura district	4	18	4	69	3	-	2	46	146	4,152	459	274,216	5,425,769

== Transport ==
Bankura Junction railway station is managed by the South Eastern Railways and is on the Adra-Midnapore rail route. It is in Bankura city. Rupashi Bangla Express, Aranyak Express, Puri-New Delhi (Nandan Kanan) Superfast Express, Ernakulam-Patna Express, Howrah-LTT Samarsata Express and Purulia-Howrah Express pass through this station. It is the originating and terminating station of Bankura Damodar Railway which will connect to Howrah-Bardhaman Chord section. Computerized reservation facility is available. Going towards north-west, Adra Junction Railway Station is the nearest main station and moving to south, Midnapore Railway Station is the major station next to Bankura.

The Bankura Junction railway station and bridge over Dhaleshwari River were built by Gujarati Railway Contractors of the town Jeewan Gangji Savaria and Lalji Raja Vadher in 1900 working for Bengal Nagpur Railway.

National Highway 14 (India) running from Morgam (in Murshidabad district) to Kharagpur (in Paschim Medinipur district), State Highway 9 (West Bengal) running from Durgapur (in Paschim Bardhaman district) to Nayagram (in Jhargram district) and State Highway 5 (West Bengal) running from Rupnarayanpur (in Bardhaman district) to Junput (in Purba Medinipur) pass through Bankura. NH 14 links Bankura to NH 12 and NH 16. Both NH 14 and SH 9 link Bankura to NH 19 (Grand Trunk Road).

The district lies in very close proximity to the Kazi Nazrul Islam Airport located in neighbouring Paschim Bardhaman.

== Notable people ==
- Khan Bahadur Dr. Syed Muhammed Siddique, MLA for Bankura
- Mohammad Shamsuzzoha (1934–1969) writer, professor and proctor
