= Mahadebsinan Hill =

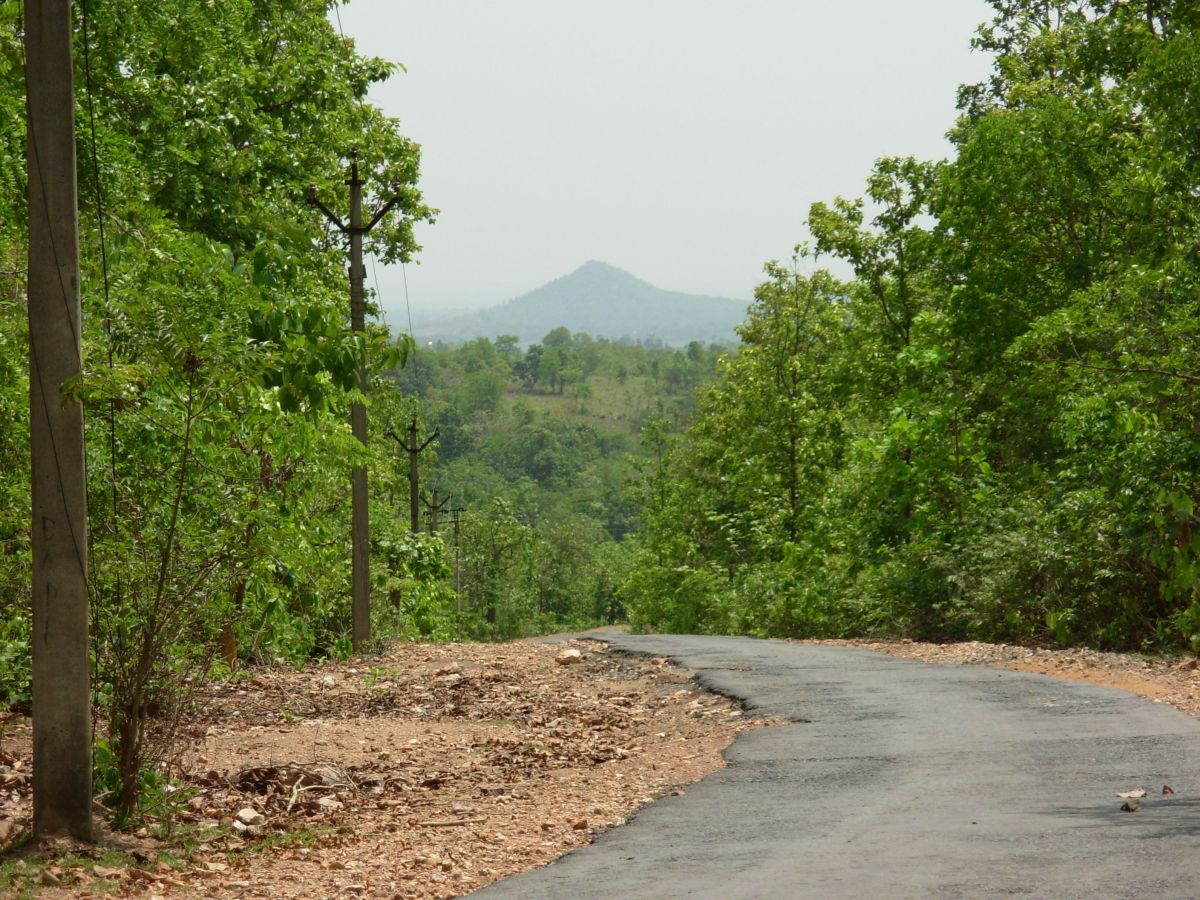
Road through tropical dry deciduous forest of Mahadebsinan hill.

Mahadebsinan Hill is a natural area in the Bankura district of West Bengal, India.

Situated in the far south of the district, this hill and its forest form the largest single continuous greenbelt of the district. The forest type is mixed, though the majority of the stands are Sal (Shorea robusta).
