= Adi Malla =

Raja of Mallabhum from 694 to 710

- Raja

Raja of Mallabhum
- Reign: 694–710
- Predecessor: Nrishingha Dev
- Successor: Jay Malla
- Wives: Chandrakumari
- Issue: Jay Malla
- Religion: Hinduism

Adi Malla (died 710), also known as Bagdi Raja, was the founder of the Mallabhum (Malla Dynasty) sometime in the 7th century CE.

== History ==
=== Origins ===
There are at least two different opinions about the origin of the Malla Kings. The first king of the Malla dynasty ascended the throne of a small jungle kingdom (the extent of a group of villages) sometime in the seventh century CE. The circumstances of this accession were miraculous. His father was a Kshatriya Prince who, caught in the "fever of pilgrimage" to the shrine of Jagannath in Puri, abandoned his pregnant wife in the jungle when her labor began. The mother died and the newborn was picked up by a Bagdi jāti woman who was gathering firewood in the jungle. The boy grew up among Bagdis. Hence he became known as the Bagdi Raja; in fact, the kings of the dynasty are often called the Bagdi rajas by the people of the region. The Bagdis themselves are still associated with royal line in many ways, an attribute that makes them and the Majhis who are similarly related to the kings the highest among the low. The boy's father had left a sword and a scroll attesting the boy's origin with his abandoned wife. A Brahman priest noted that the royal child was different from the rest and took him away to his house, together with the kingly insignia. Many portents foretold the future kingship of the boy. He brought home golden nuggets he found in a riverbed; he fished out a golden insignia from the river; a huge cobra was seen standing over him, shielding him from the sun when he fell asleep in the forest herding cows (much to the horror of his adoptive father, who searched the whole area in despair when the boy did not return home on time). When the king died and the Brahman was invited to the funeral feast (sraddha), he took the boy with him. To everyone's amazement, the dead king's elephant lifted the boy from the rows of spectators and placed him gently on the throne.

=== Mallabhum ===
The Rajas of Bishnupur were also known as Malla kings. Malla is a Sanskrit word meaning wrestler but there may be some links with the Mal tribes of the area. The Malla Kingdom was divided into six big Ghatowala named Bantor, Bankdaha, Chua Masan, Khatul, Jarbelia and Baishgram. Among these No. 1 to No. 5 were called Bara Hazari, which were directly under the rule of the Malla kings.

From around 7th century CE until around the advent of British rule, which is around a millennium, the history of Bankura district is identical with the rise and fall of the Hindu Rajas of Bishnupur. The legends of Bipodtarini Devi are associated with Malla Kings of Bishnupur.

== Sources ==
- Ostor, Akos (2004), The Play of the Gods: Locality, Ideology, Structure, and Time in the ..., D C Publishers, p. 46, ISBN 8180280136
- Dasgupta, Gautam Kumar; Biswas, Samira; Mallik, Rabiranjan (2009), Heritage Tourism: An Anthropological Journey to Bishnupur, A Mittal Publication, p. 19, ISBN 978-8183242943
- "History of Bishunpur-Raj: An Ancient Kingdom of West Bengal". INDIAN CULTURE.
