= Bagdi (caste) =

Dalit community of Bengal

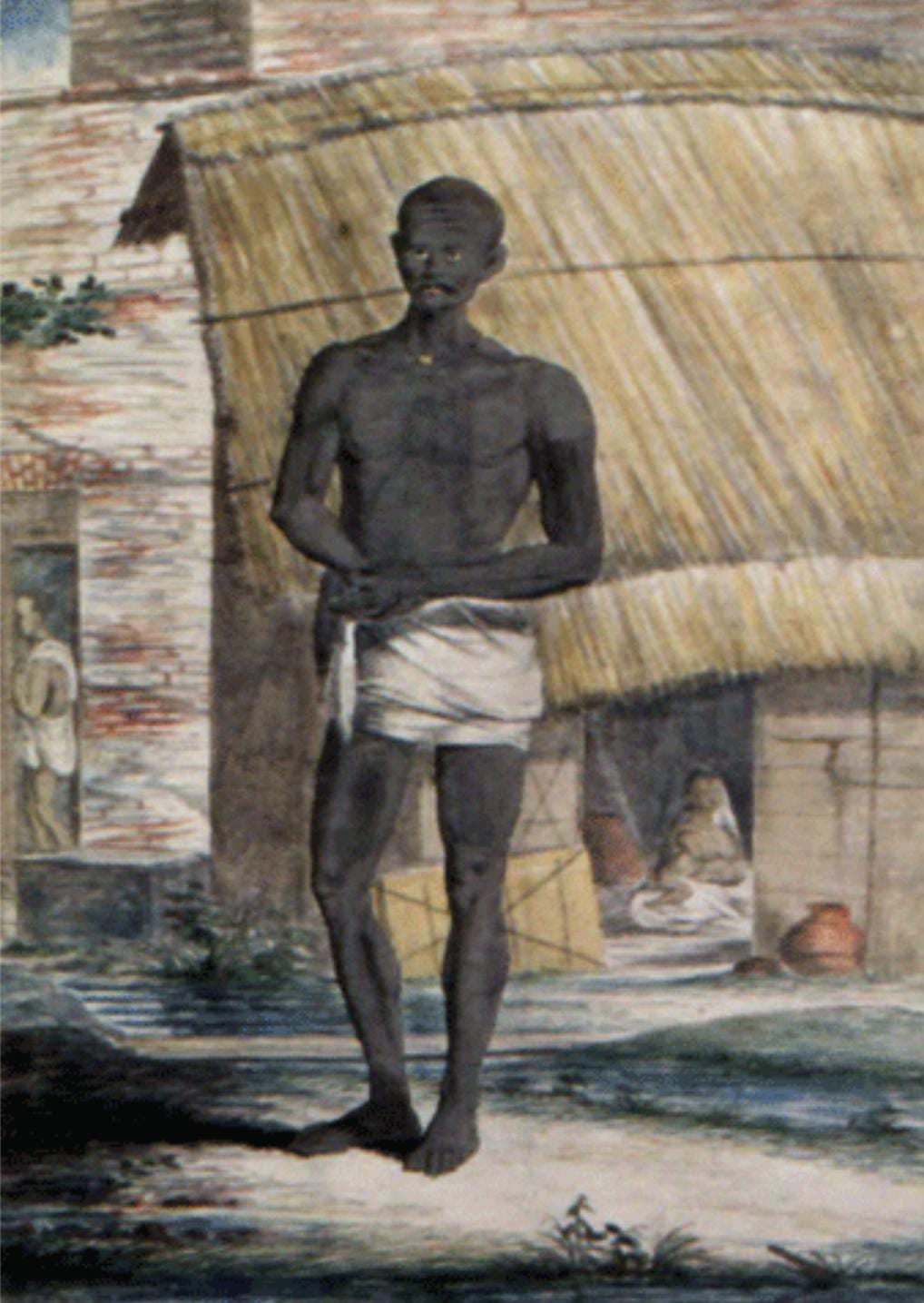
- Bagdi labourer, from a 1799 collection of etchings

Regions with significant populations
- West Bengal: 3,058,265

Languages
- Bengali

Religion
- Hinduism

The Bagdis are a Hindu caste, descended from people with Dravidian links, found in the Bengal region, who were traditionally associated with professions like cultivation and fishing. They are related to the Duley caste. The Bagdis are populous in Bankura, Birbhum and other districts in the western fringe of West Bengal. The Bagdi along with the Duley represent the most numerous Scheduled castes of West Bengal. The Bagdis claim to be a Kshatriya caste of Bengal, namely 'Barga Kshatriya'.

== History ==
J.N. Bhattacharya described the Bagdis as an aboriginal nomadic caste, who were fishermen, woodcutters, and litter carriers. The Bagdis were also known as the criminal tribe of Bengal under Criminal Tribes Act of the British.

== Population and Literacy Data ==
The Bagdis numbered 2,740,385 in West Bengal in the 2001 Indian census and were 14.9 percent of the Scheduled caste population of West Bengal. 47.7 percent of the Bagdis were literate – 60.4 percent males and 34.8 percent females were literate.

== See also ==
- Bagdi Raja
