= Jor Mandir =

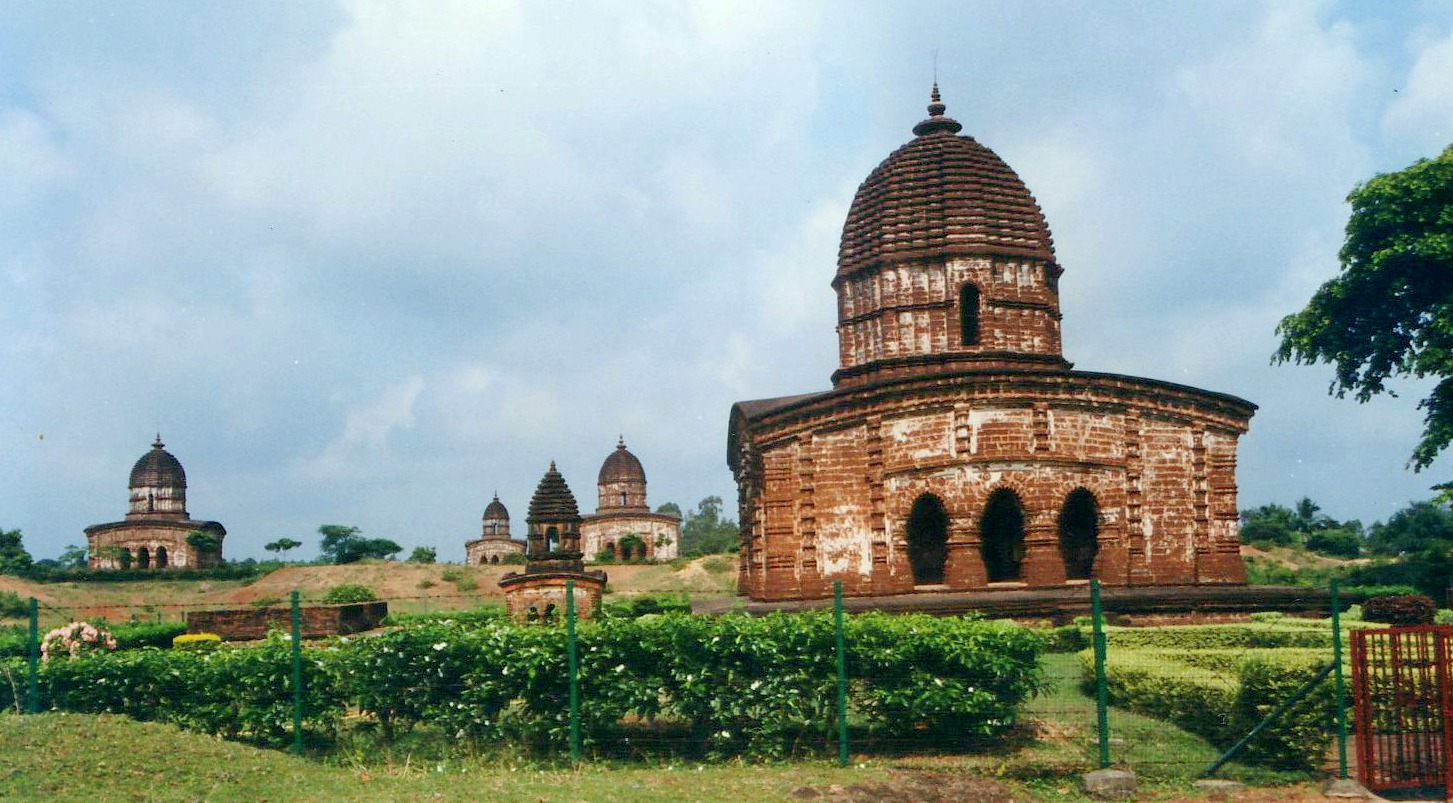

Religion
- Affiliation: Hinduism
- District: Bankura
- Deity: Narayana

Location
- Location: Bishnupur
- State: West Bengal
- Country: India
- Interactive map of Jor Mandir
- Coordinates: 23°3′36.69″N 87°19′18.87″E

Architecture
- Type: Bengal temple architecture
- Style: Ek-ratna style
- Founder: Gopal Singha Dev I
- Established: 1726; 300 years ago
- Monument of National Importance
- Official name: Jor Mandir
- Type: Cultural
- Reference no.: IN-WB-10

Jor Mandir also known as group of temples, Located in Bishnupur in Indian state of West Bengal.

== History and architecture ==
The temple was built in 1726 by King Gopal Singha Dev I of Mallabhum. The Temple is built in the Ek-ratna style temple architecture.

Among the Jor-Mandir group of temples, the two on the south and north are slightly larger than the one at middle. The temple, which is situated in the centre, is decorated with extensive and elaborate ornamentations. There are stucco figures on the laterite wall. The subject of the detailed ornamentation in laterite are mostly illustrations from the Ramayana and also Krishna-lila. This temple on plan is like other eka-ratna temples. Another temple which is situated on the northern side also has on its walls some ornamentations of interesting nature. The temple on the north side is square on plan, each side measuring 11.7 m and 12.2 m in height, the middle one is square on plan each side being 7 m and 7.6 m in height and the temple on the south side is about 1 1.8 square m on plan and 12.2 m in height.

Currently, it is preserved as one of the archaeological monuments by the Archaeological Survey of India. Since 1998, the Jor Mandir temple is on the UNESCO World Heritage Site's Tentative list.

== Gallery ==
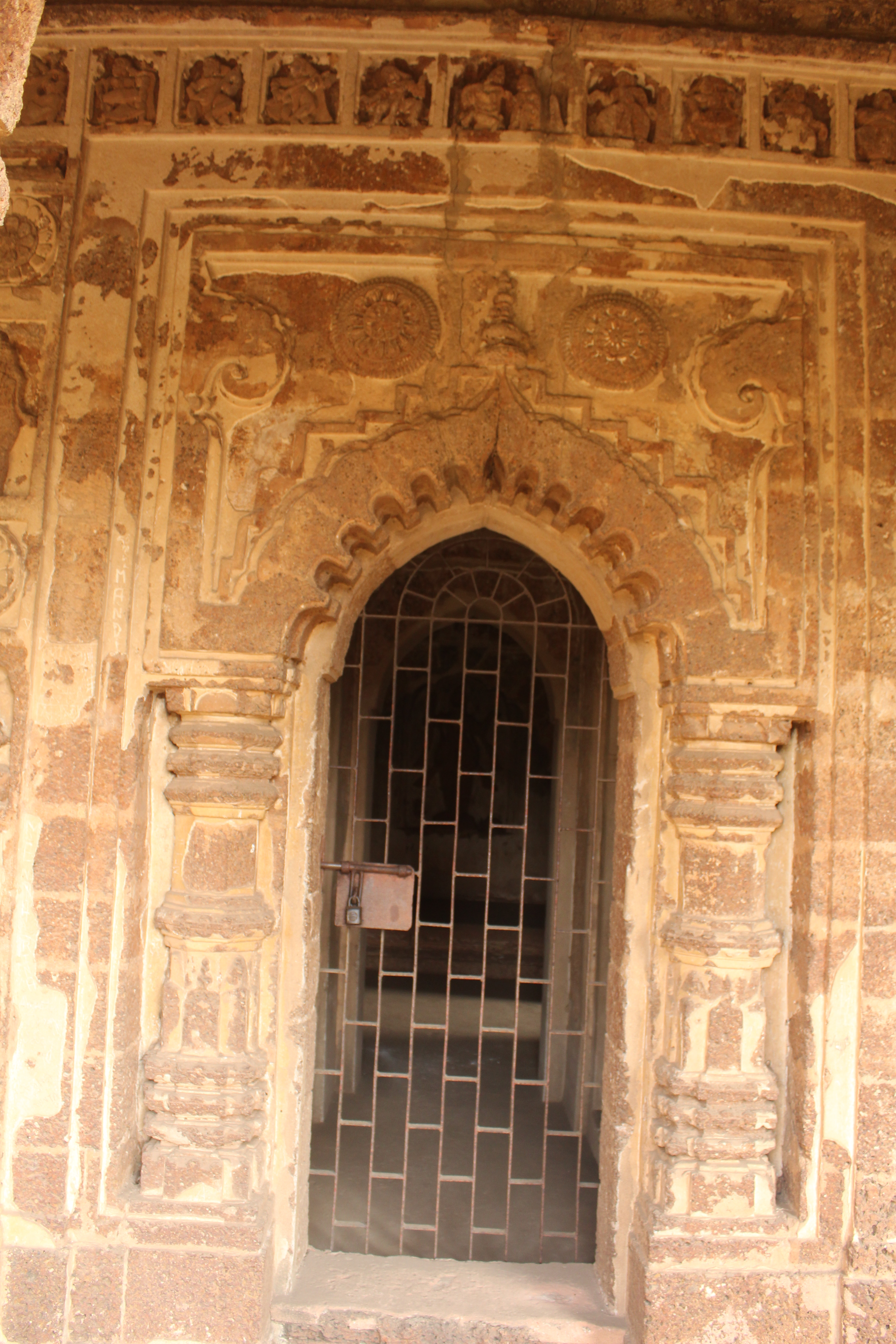

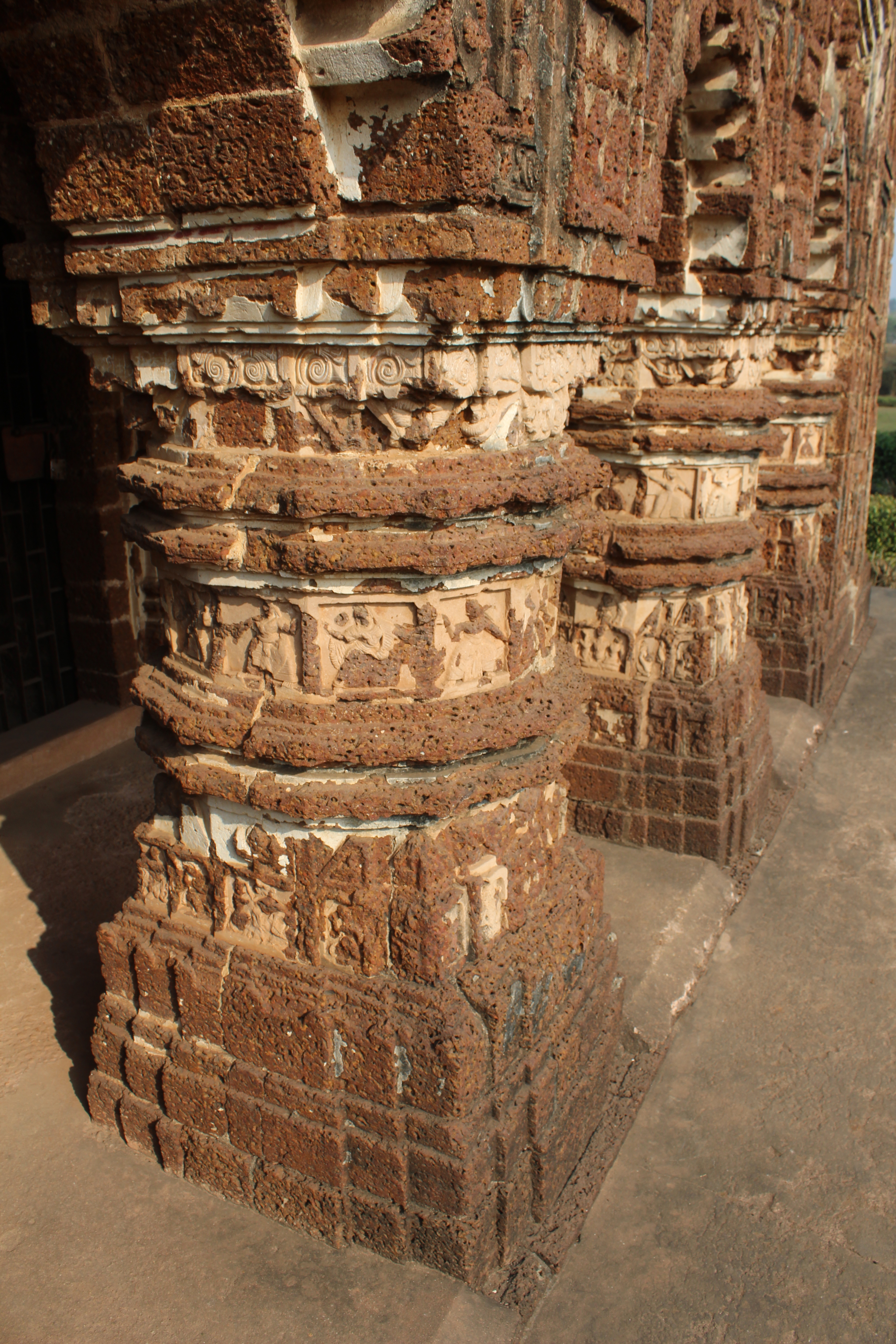

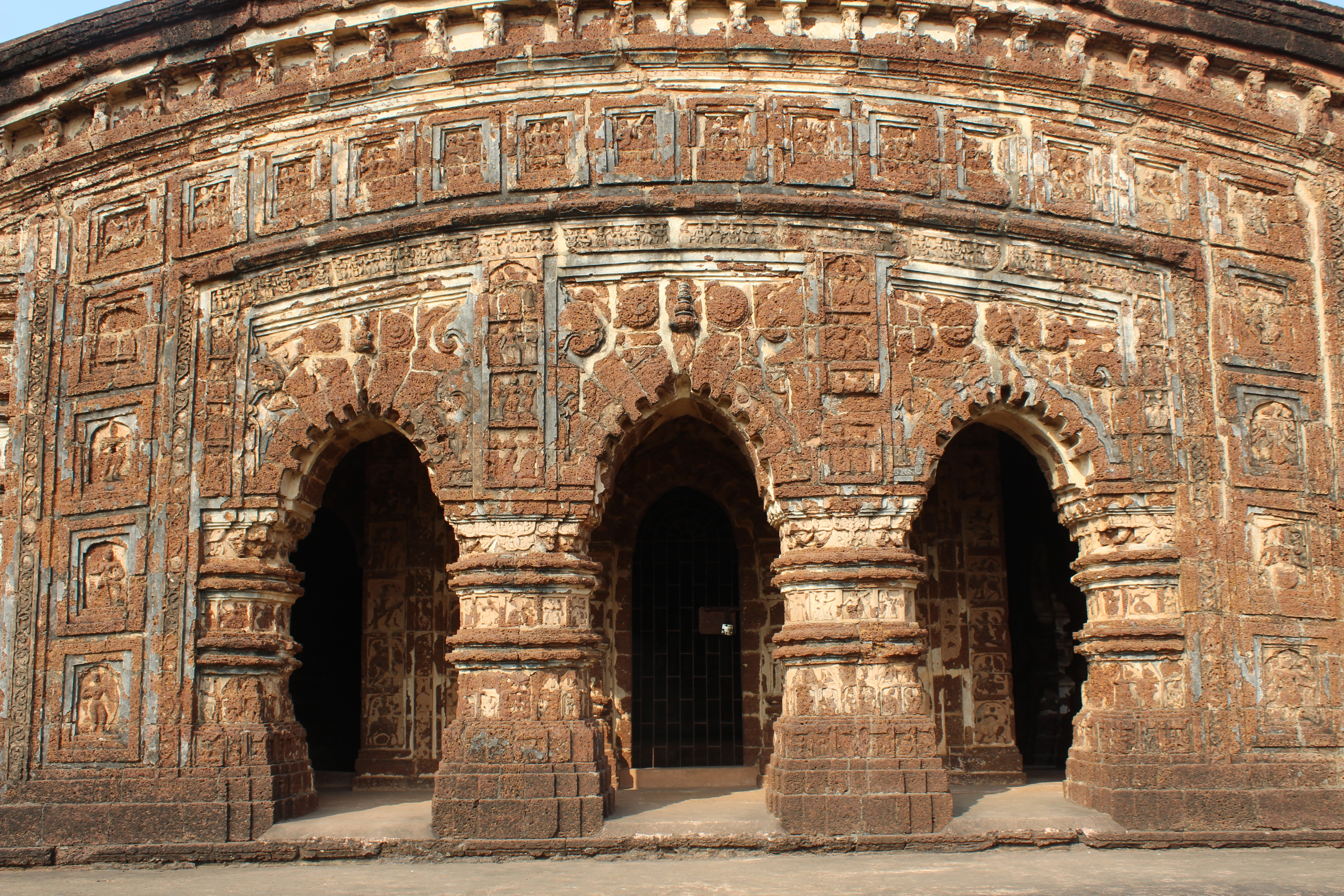

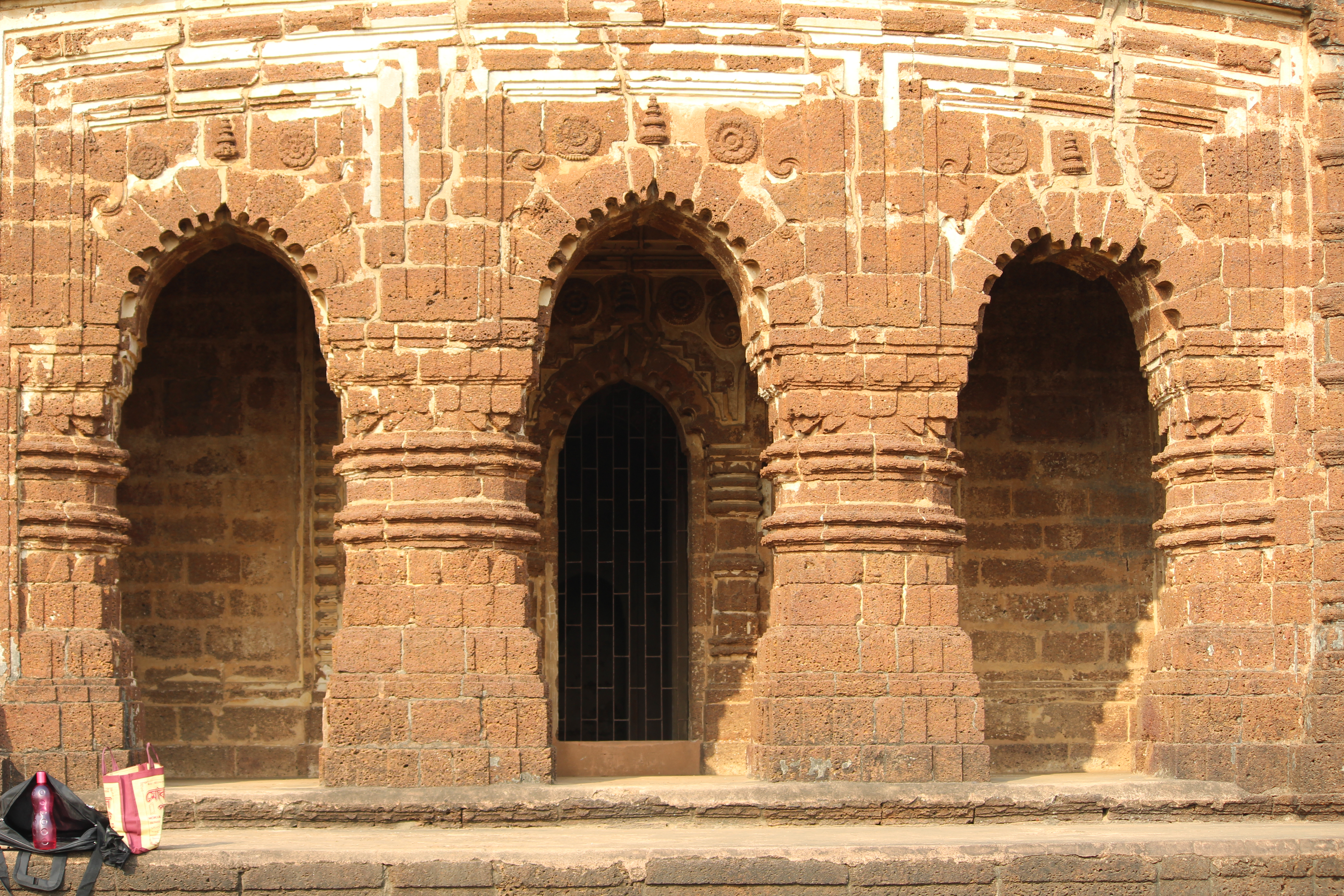

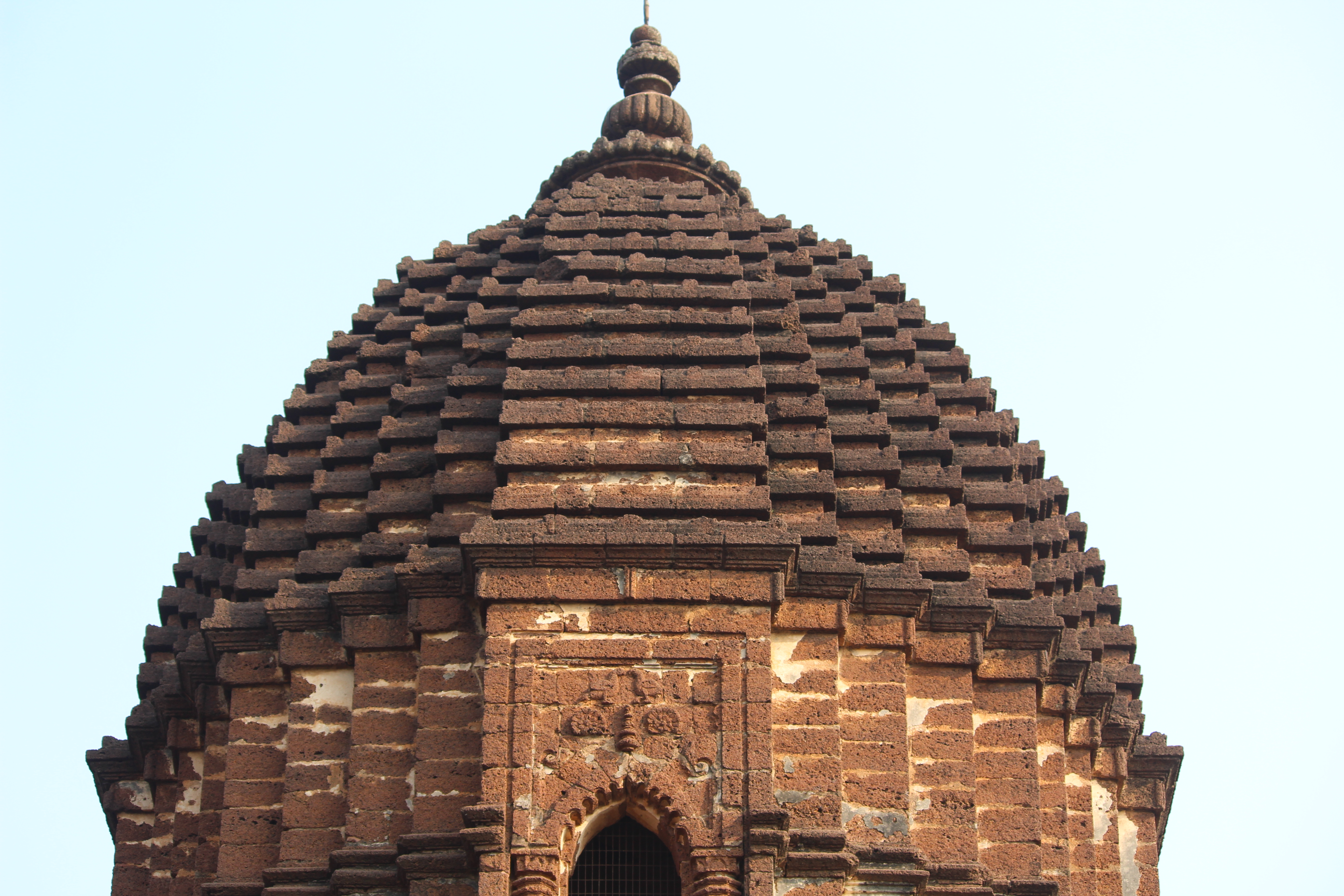

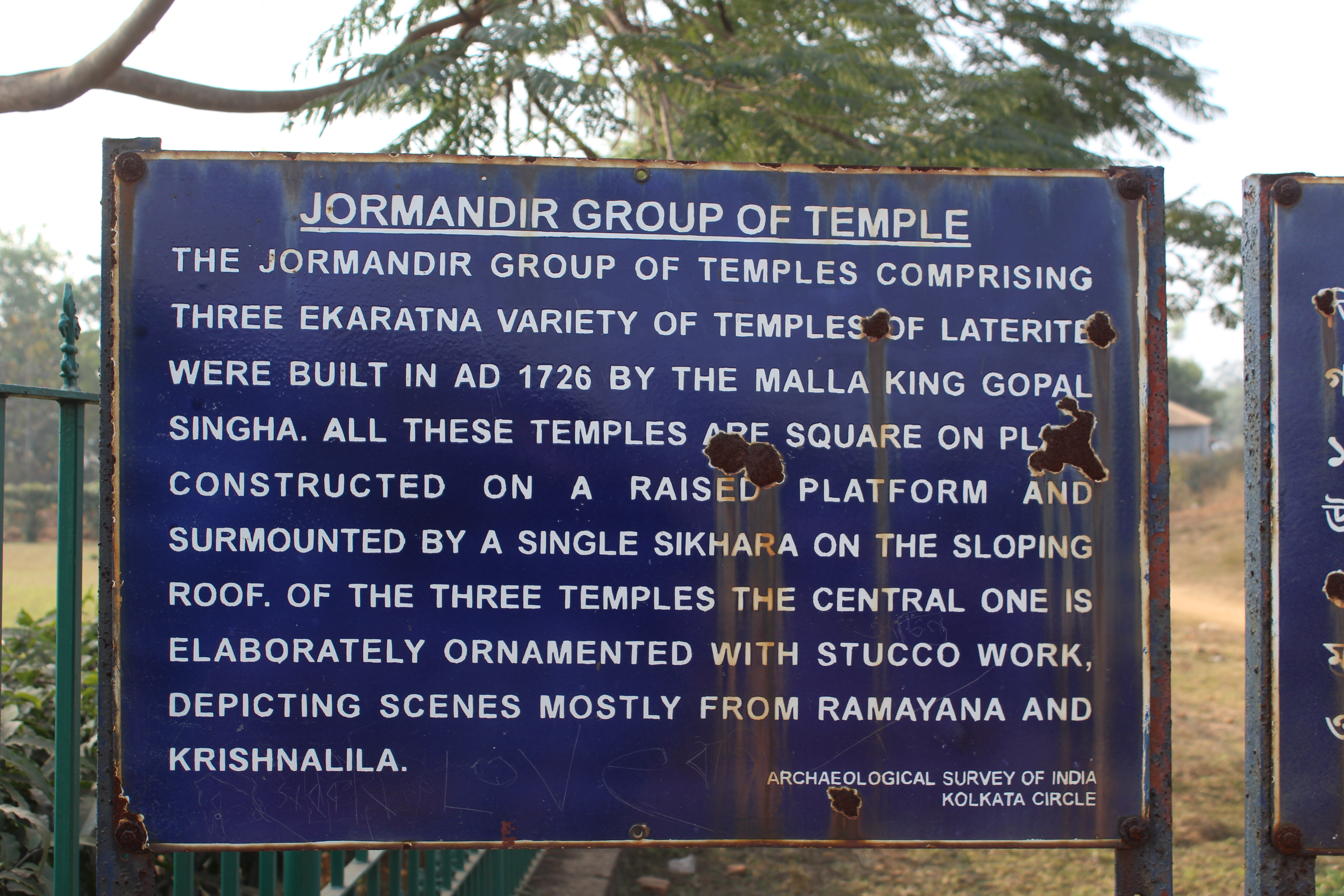

== Sources ==
- Biswas, S. S. (1992). Bishnupur (University of Illinois at Urbana-Champaign ed.). Director General, Archaeological Survey of India.
