= Kinu Malla =

Raja of Mallabhum from 733 to 742

Raja of Mallabhum
- Reign: 733–742
- Predecessor: Benu Malla
- Successor: Indra Malla
- Religion: Hinduism

Kinu Malla was the fourth king of the Mallabhum. He ruled from 733 to 742.

== History ==
In 733 CE. Kinu Malla defeated the king of Indrahansh presently known as Indus and extended the kingdom.

== Sources ==
- Dasgupta, Gautam Kumar; Biswas, Samira; Mallik, Rabiranjan (2009), Heritage Tourism: An Anthropological Journey to Bishnupur, A Mittal Publication, ISBN 978-8183242943
