= Benu Malla =

Raja of Mallabhum from 720 to 733

Raja of Mallabhum
- Reign: 720–733
- Predecessor: Jay Malla
- Successor: Kinu Malla
- Issue: Kinu Malla
- Father: Jay Malla
- Religion: Hinduism

Benu Malla was the 3rd king of Bagdi Malla dynasty of Bishnupur. He ruled from 720 - 733 CE. His father was Jay Malla (710 - 720 CE). After Benu Malla, his son Kinu Malla became the king of Malla dynasty and he ruled from 733 - 742 CE.

== Sources ==
- Dasgupta, Gautam Kumar; Biswas, Samira; Mallik, Rabiranjan (2009), Heritage Tourism: An Anthropological Journey to Bishnupur, A Mittal Publication, p. 37, ISBN 978-8183242943
