= Jay Malla =

Raja of Mallabhum from 710 to 720

Raja of Mallabhum
- Reign: 710–720
- Predecessor: Adi Malla
- Successor: Benu Malla
- Issue: Benu Malla
- Father: Adi Malla
- Religion: Hinduism

Jay Malla, also known as Joy Malla and Jai Malla, was the son of Adi Malla, the founder of the Mallabhum (Malla Dynasty).

== History ==
According to Chanda (2004), Adi Malla ruled at the palace for sixteen years, from 694 to 710. After his death, his son Jay Malla became king.

Jay Malla was also famous for his bravery and military skill, that was supposedly similar to that of his father.

== Sources ==
- Dasgupta, Gautam Kumar; Biswas, Samira; Mallik, Rabiranjan (2009), Heritage Tourism: An Anthropological Journey to Bishnupur, A Mittal Publication, p. 19, ISBN 978-8183242943
- O’Malley, L.S.S., ICS, Bankura, Bengal District Gazetteers, pp. 21-46(24), 1995 reprint, first published 1908, Government of West Bengal
