= Matgoda =

- Village
- Location in West Bengal, India Matgoda (India)
- Coordinates: 22.7745°N 86.9038°E
- Country: India
- State: West Bengal
- District: Bankura

Population (2011)
  - Total: 5,197

Languages
  - Official: Bengali, English
- Time zone: UTC+5:30 (IST)
- PIN: 722134
- Telephone/STD code: 03243
- Lok Sabha constituency: Bankura
- Vidhan Sabha constituency: Raipur
- Website: bankura.gov.in

Matgoda is a small town and a gram panchayat in the Raipur CD block in the Khatra subdivision of the Bankura district in the state of West Bengal, India.

== History ==
According to Binoy Ghosh, the southern part of the Raipur thana area, covering Shyamsundarpur, Phulkusma, Simlapal, Raipur, Bhataidihi and other villages, was known as Rajagram. There was a feudatory ruler in Rajagram, who for some unknown reason, committed suicide along with his entire family, by jumping into fire. With no one left to become king, the entire area was infested with wild animals and plunderers, till Nukur Tung arrived on the scene, controlled the plunderers and became king.

Nukur Tung's background has a history laced with colourful local folklore. He was great-grandson of Tung Deo, who used to live somewhere along the banks of the Gandaki River in Odisha. During the course of a pilgrimage to Puri, he was made king of Puri by favour of Jagannath. His grandson Gangadhar Tung was informed in a dream by Jagannath that after him there would no king of Puri in his line. Therefore, his son should change his name and go to some other place where he could be king. Gangadhar Tung's son, Nukur Tung, left Puri with his wife, his treasure, and some soldiers in 1348 AD and after wandering for a decade settled in Tikarpara, a village near Shyamsundarpur. He controlled the local plunderers and became king, adopting the name Chhatra Narayan Deb. The area came to be known as Tungbhum. A large number of Utkala Brahmin families came and settled in the area, where even today, the influence of Odia culture is noticeable.

He made a grant of the zamindari of Simplapal pargana to Sripati Mahapatra, his spiritual guide and general during the campaign. Raipur pargana was given as a grant to a member of the Sikhar Raj family. Six generations after Chhatra Narayan Deb, as a result of a family dispute, the estate was divided into Shyamsundarpur and Phulkusma. The former became the zamindari of Lakshmi Narayan and the latter of Darpanarayan. Subsequently, as a consequence of the permanent settlement, both the zamindaries got debt-ridden and ran into rough weather. However, even now people in the area refer to them as Bara Tunga and Chhoto Tunga.

== Geography ==
Places in Khatra subdivision in Bankura district
CT: census town, R: rural/ urban centre, C: craft centre, T: ancient/ temple centre
Owing to space constraints in the small map, the actual locations in a larger map may vary slightly

=== Location ===
Matgoda is located at 22.7745°N 86.9038°E.

=== Area overview ===
The map alongside shows the Khatra subdivision of Bankura district. Physiographically, this area is having uneven lands with hard rocks. In the Khatra CD block area there are some low hills. The Kangsabati project reservoir is prominently visible in the map. The subdued patches of shaded area in the map show forested areas. It is an almost fully rural area.

Note: The map alongside presents some of the notable locations in the subdivision. All places marked in the map are linked in the larger full screen map.

== Demographics ==
According to the 2011 Census of India, Matgoda had a total population of 5,197, of which 2,697 (52%) were males and 2,500 (48%) were females. There were 568 persons in the age range of 0–6 years. The total number of literate persons in Matgoda was 3,625 (78.31% of the population over 6 years).

== Education ==
Matgoda High School is a Bengali-medium coeducational institution established in 1957. It has facilities for teaching from class V to class XII. The school has 4 computers, a library with 1,050 books and a playground.

Raipur Block Mahavidyalaya was established in 2010 at Kharigerya. It is affiliated to the Bankura University and offers honours courses in Bengali, Santali and history.

== Culture ==
According to Binoy Ghosh, The Raja of Shyamsundarpur got a dream message to restore an abandoned idol of Dharmathakur, and he did as advised in his dream. The abandoned idol was set up in the Dharmathakur temple at Matgoda, alongside other Hindu deities. Dharmathakur is worshipped at Matgoda in a special way in the month of Magh and a fortnight long Sanimela is organized concluding with a big show on the last Saturday of the month of Magh. It may be noted that the celebrations are in no way connected with the Hindu deity Sani, the celebrations are linked with Dharmathakur, the popular deity, worshipped widely by the people of lower castes in certain areas of rural Bengal, e.g. Bankura. The Santals have several festivities in the months of Magh and Poush. One of them is Magh Sim Jom with cock-fights followed by great feasts. When Binoy Ghosh attended the Matgoda Sani Mela in 1968, he found it to be a predominantly Santali affair. They came in huge crowds and thoroughly enjoyed, in their own way, for the whole day. Others hardly formed a sprinkling. Elders attending the mela told Binoy Ghosh that in earlier days Santali girls used to dance in large numbers throughout the day. However, that practice was stopped a few years prior to Binoy Ghosh's visit, in Matgoda, as well as in other places in West Bengal. The Raja of Shyamsundarpur plays a big role in the whole show.

== Healthcare ==
There is a primary health centre at Matgoda, with 6 beds.
