= Ghutgarya =

Ghutgarya Ghutgoria
- Census Town
- Location in West Bengal, India Ghutgarya (India)
- Coordinates: 23.4458°N 87.2524°E
- Country: India
- State: West Bengal
- District: Bankura

Area
  - Total: 3.6417 km^{2} (1.4061 sq mi)

Population (2011)
  - Total: 5,311
  - Density: 1,458/km^{2} (3,777/sq mi)

Languages
  - Official: Bengali, English
- Time zone: UTC+5:30 (IST)
- PIN: 722168
- Telephone/STD code: 03243
- Lok Sabha constituency: Bishnupur
- Vidhan Sabha constituency: Barjora
- Website: bankura.gov.in

Ghutgarya (also known as Ghutgoria) is a census town in the Barjora CD block in the Bankura Sadar subdivision of the Bankura district in the state of West Bengal, India.

== Geography ==
Places in Bankura Sadar subdivision in Bankura district
M: municipal town/ city, CT: census town, R: rural/ urban centre, H: hill centre, T: temple/ religious centre, B: barrage
Owing to space constraints in the small map, the actual locations in a larger map may vary slightly

=== Location ===
Ghutgarya is located at 23.4458°N 87.2524°E.

=== Area overview ===
The map alongside shows the Bankura Sadar subdivision of Bankura district. Physiographically, this area is part of the Bankura Uplands in the west gradually merging with the Bankura-Bishnupur Rarh Plains in the north-east. The western portions are characterised by undulating terrain with many hills and ridges. The area is having a gradual descent from the Chota Nagpur Plateau. The soil is laterite red and hard beds are covered with scrub jungle and sal wood. Gradually it gives way to just uneven rolling lands but the soil continues to be lateritic. There are coal mines in the northern part, along the Damodar River. It is a predominantly rural area with 89% of the population living in rural areas and only 11% living in the urban areas.

Note: The map alongside presents some of the notable locations in the subdivision. All places marked in the map are linked in the larger full screen map.

== Demographics ==
According to the 2011 Census of India, Ghutgarya had a total population of 5,311, of which 2,693 (51%) were males and 2,618 (49%) were females. There were 703 persons in the age range of 0–6 years. The total number of literate persons in Ghutgarya was 3,389 (73.55% of the population over 6 years).

== Infrastructure ==
According to the District Census Handbook 2011, Bankura, Ghutgarya covered an area of 3.6417 km^{2}. Among the civic amenities, it had 6 km roads with open drains, the protected water supply involved tap water from un-treated sources, tubewell/ borehole. It had 802 domestic electric connections. Among the medical facilities it had 1 hospital, 1 dispensary/ health centre, 2 maternity and child welfare centres, 1 nursing home, 1 veterinary hospital, 1 charitable hospital/ nursery, 16 medicine shops. Among the educational facilities it had were 2 primary schools, 1 middle school, 1 secondary school, 1 senior secondary school, the nearest general degree college at Barjora 3 km away. It had 4 non-formal education centres (Sarva Shiksha Abhiyan). Among the social cultural and recreational facilities, it had 1 public library, 1 reading room. Three important commodities it produced were fishing hooks, sankha and pola bandha. It had the branch offices of 1 nationalised bank.

== Education ==
Ghutgoria High School is a Bengali-medium coeducational institution established in 1947. It has facilities for teaching from class V to class XII. The school has 10 computers and a library with 2,000 books.

Nutangram High School is a Bengali-medium coeducational institution established in 1966. It has facilities for teaching from class V to class XII. The school has 10 computers and a library with 1,000 books.

Barjora College was established in 1985 at Barjora. It is affiliated with the Bankura University and offers honours courses in English, Bengali, Sanskrit, history, political science, philosophy, economics and geography.

== Culture ==
David J. McCutchion mentions that the abandoned temple, possibly a Radha-Damodara temple, is a tall and slender smooth curvilinear rekha, largely plain, built of sandstone, having a carved doorway with cusped arch. It was constructed in the 17th-18th century.

The Archaeological Survey of India, Kolkata Circle, describes the Radha Damodar temple as a stone built temple, with a pancha-ratha plan similar to Odisha temple architecture, probably erected in the 17th century.

The Radha Damodar Jiu Temple is included in the List of Monuments of National Importance in West Bengal by the Archaeological Survey of India (serial no. N-WB-30).

== Healthcare ==
Barjora Rural Hospital, with 30 beds, is the major government medical facility in the Barjora CD block.
