= Sujit Chakraborty =

Indian politician (born 1968)

Member of the West Bengal Legislative Assembly
- In office 2016–2021
- Preceded by: Asutosh Mukherjee
- Succeeded by: Alok Mukherjee
- Constituency: Barjora

Personal details
- Born: 1968 (age 57–58) West Bengal, India
- Party: Communist Party of India (Marxist)
- Occupation: Politician
- Profession: Politician

Sujit Chakraborty (born 1968) is an Indian politician from West Bengal. He is a former member of the West Bengal Legislative Assembly from Barjora Assembly constituency in Bankura district. He was elected in the 2016 West Bengal Legislative Assembly election representing the Communist Party of India (Marxist) Party.

== Early life and education ==
Chakraborty is from Barjora, Bankura district, West Bengal. He is the son of Susanta Kumar Chakraborty. He completed his graduation in commerce at Sonamukhi College which is affiliated with the Burdwan University in the year 1988.

== Career ==
Chakraborty was elected in the Barjora Paschim Assembly constituency representing the Communist Party of India (Marxist) in the 2016 West Bengal Legislative Assembly election. He polled 86,873 votes and defeated his nearest rival, Soham Chakraborty of the All India Trinamool Congress, by a margin of 616 votes. He contested again on the Communist Party ticket in the 2021 West Bengal Legislative Assembly election but lost the seat. He polled 25,235 votes and could finish only third behind winner, Alok Mukherjee of the All India Trinamool Congress, who got 93,290 votes, and runner up, Supriti Chatterjee of the Bharatiya Janata Party, who polled 90,021 votes.
