= Barjora (community development block) =

- Community development block
- Coordinates: 23.43°N 87.28°E
- Country: India
- State: West Bengal
- District: Bankura

Government
  - Type: Representative democracy

Area
  - Total: 393.23 km^{2} (151.83 sq mi)
- Elevation: 71 m (233 ft)

Population (2011)
  - Total: 202,049
  - Density: 513.82/km^{2} (1,330.8/sq mi)

Languages
  - Official: Bengali, English
- Time zone: UTC+5:30 (IST)
- PIN: 722202 (Barjora); 722203 (Beliatore); 722208 (Pakhanna); 722168 (Ghutgoria); 722142 (Maliara)
- Telephone/STD code: 03243
- ISO 3166 code: IN-WB
- Vehicle registration: WB-67, WB=68
- Literacy: 71.67%
- Lok Sabha constituency: Bishnupur
- Vidhan Sabha constituency: Barjora
- Website: bankura.gov.in

Barjora is a community development block (CD block) that forms an administrative division in the Bankura Sadar subdivision of the Bankura district in the Indian state of West Bengal.

== History ==
=== From Bishnupur kingdom to the British Raj ===
From around the 7th century AD till around the advent of British rule, for around a millennium, history of Bankura district is identical with the rise and fall of the Hindu Rajas of Bishnupur. The Bishnupur Rajas, who were at the summit of their fortunes towards the end of the 17th century, started declining in the first half of the 18th century. First, the Maharaja of Burdwan seized the Fatehpur Mahal, and then the Maratha invasions laid waste their country.

Bishnupur was ceded to the British with the rest of Burdwan chakla in 1760. In 1787, Bishnupur was united with Birbhum to form a separate administrative unit. In 1793 it was transferred to the Burdwan collectorate. In 1879, the district acquired its present shape with the thanas of Khatra and Raipur and the outpost of Simplapal being transferred from Manbhum, and the thanas of Sonamukhi, Kotulpur and Indas being retransferred from Burdwan. However, it was known for sometime as West Burdwan and in 1881 came to be known as Bankura district.

== Geography ==
Map of Bankura District showing CD blocks and municipalities

Barjora is located at 23°26′N 87°17′E.

Barjora CD block is located in the northern part of the district. It belongs to the uneven lands/ hard ring rock area. The soil is laterite red and hard beds are covered with scrub jungle and sal wood. There are coal mines in Saltora, Mejia and Barjora.

Barjora CD block is bounded by the Faridpur-Durgapur CD block, in Bardhaman district across the Damodar, on the north, Sonamukhi CD block on the east, Onda and Bankura II CD blocks on the south and Gangajalghati and Mejia CD blocks on the west.

Barjora CD block has an area of 393.23 km^{2}. It has 1 panchayat samity, 11 gram panchayats, 157 gram sansads (village councils), 199 mouzas, 182 inhabited villages and 3 census towns. Barjora and Beliatore police stations serve this block. Headquarters of this CD block is at Barjora.

Gram panchayats of Barjora block/ panchayat samiti are: Barjora, Beliatore, Brindabanpur, Chhandar, Ghutghoria, Godardihi, Hat Asuria, Khanrari, Maliara, Pakhanna and Sharjora.

== Demographics ==
=== Population ===
According to the 2011 Census of India, Barjora CD block had a total population of 202,049, of which 176,263 were rural and 25786 were urban. There were 103,769 (51%) males and 98,280 (49%) females. Population in the age range of 0 to 6 years was 22,827. Scheduled Castes numbered 68,365 (33.85%) and Scheduled Tribes numbered 3,322 (1.64%).

According to the 2001 census, Barjora block had a total population of 178,976, out of which 92,330 were males and 86,646 were females. Barjora block registered a population growth of 12.52 per cent during the 1991-2001 decade. Decadal growth for the district was 15.15 per cent. Decadal growth in West Bengal was 17.84 per cent.

Census Towns in Barjora CD block are (2011 census figures in brackets): Barjora (14,012), Ghutgarya (5,311) and Beliatore (6,443).

Large villages (with 4,000+ population) in Barjora CD block are (2011 census figures in brackets): Maliara (7,918), Paharpur (4,450), Krishna Nagar (5,201) and Hatashuria (4,505)

Other villages in Barjora CD block are (2011 census figures in brackets): Chhandar (1,776), Pakhanna (3,588), Sharjora (3,862), Khanrari (2,052), Chhandar (1,776) and Brindabanpur (1,031)

=== Literacy ===
According to the 2011 census, the total number of literates in Barjora CD block was 128,443 (71.67% of the population over 6 years) out of which males numbered 74,551 (81.01% of the male population over 6 years) and females numbered 53,892 (61.81%) of the female population over 6 years). The gender disparity (the difference between female and male literacy rates) was 19.20%.

See also – List of West Bengal districts ranked by literacy rate

Literacy in CD blocks of
Bankura district
Bankura Sadar subdivision
Saltora – 61.45%
Mejia – 66.83%
Gangajalghati – 68.11%
Chhatna – 65.73%
Bankura I – 68.74%
Bankura II – 73.59%
Barjora – 71.67%
Onda – 65.82%
Bishnupur subdivision
Indas – 71.70%
Joypur – 74.57%
Patrasayer – 64.8%
Kotulpur – 78.01%
Sonamukhi – 66.16%
Bishnupur – 66.30%
Khatra subdivision
Indpur – 67.42%
Ranibandh – 68.53%
Khatra – 72.18%
Hirbandh – 64.18%
Raipur – 71.33%
Sarenga – 74.25%
Simlapal – 68.44%
Taldangra – 70.87%
2011 Census: CD Block Wise

Primary Census Abstract Data

=== Language and religion ===
Religion in Barjora CD block (2011)
Hinduism	93.22%
Islam	6.69%
Other or not stated	0.09%

In the 2011 census Hindus numbered 188,340 and formed 93.22% of the population in Barjora CD block. Muslims numbered 13,515 and formed 6.69% of the population. Christians numbered 29 and formed 0.01% of the population. Others numbered 165 and formed 0.08% of the population. Others include Addi Bassi, Marang Boro, Santal, Saranath, Sari Dharma, Sarna, Alchchi, Bidin, Sant, Saevdharm, Seran, Saran, Sarin, Kheria, and other religious communities. In 2001, Hindus were 93.12% and Muslims 6.46% of the population.

Languages of Barjora CD block (2011)
1. Bengali (98.4%)
2. Santali (1.24%)
3. Others (0.35%)

At the time of the 2011 census, 98.41% of the population spoke Bengali and 1.24% Santali as their first language.

== Rural poverty ==
In Barjora CD block 43.89% families were living below poverty line in 2007. According to the Rural Household Survey in 2005, 28.87% of the total number of families were BPL families in the Bankura district.

== Economy ==
=== Livelihood ===
Livelihood
in Barjora CD block
1. Cultivators (19.3%)
2. Agricultural labourers (36.2%)
3. Household industries (3.96%)
4. Other Workers (40.5%)

In the Barjora CD block in 2011, among the class of total workers, cultivators numbered 15,235 and formed 19.26%, agricultural labourers numbered 28,677 and formed 36.25%, household industry workers numbered 3,135 and formed 3.96% and other workers numbered 32,060 and formed 40.53%. Total workers numbered 79,107 and formed 39.15% of the total population, and non-workers numbered 122,942 and formed 60.85% of the population.

Note: In the census records a person is considered a cultivator, if the person is engaged in cultivation/ supervision of land owned by self/government/institution. When a person who works on another person's land for wages in cash or kind or share, is regarded as an agricultural labourer. Household industry is defined as an industry conducted by one or more members of the family within the household or village, and one that does not qualify for registration as a factory under the Factories Act. Other workers are persons engaged in some economic activity other than cultivators, agricultural labourers and household workers. It includes factory, mining, plantation, transport and office workers, those engaged in business and commerce, teachers, entertainment artistes and so on.

=== Infrastructure ===
There are 182 inhabited villages in the Barjora CD block, as per the District Census Handbook, Bankura, 2011. 100% villages have power supply. 100% villages have drinking water supply. 22 villages (12.09%) have post offices. 158 villages (86.81%) have telephones (including landlines, public call offices and mobile phones). 39 villages (29.43%) have pucca (paved) approach roads and 75 villages (45.21%) have transport communication (includes bus service, rail facility and navigable waterways). 13 villages (7.14%) have agricultural credit societies and 10 villages (5.49%) have banks.

=== Coal ===
Coal in Barakar formation is found in Barjora CD block. In Barjora coalfield a major part of the coal seams are covered with alluvium and laterite up to 35 m thick. As per the Geological Survey of India, proved reserve is 12 million tonnes.

=== Industries ===
Govinda Impex Pvt. Ltd. at Barjora produces sponge iron, mild steel billets and ferro alloys. It employs 400 people. Rishab Sponge Pvt. Ltd. produces sponge iron and employs 400 people.

=== Durgapur Barrage ===
The 88 km long west bank canal from Durgapur Barrage passes through Barjora, Sonamukhi, Patrasayer and Indas police station areas. With the passage of time the canal system has lost much of its efficiency.

=== Agriculture ===
in 2013-14. There were 75 fertiliser depots, 16 seed stores and 58 fair price shops in the CD block.

In 2013-14, persons engaged in agriculture in Barjora CD block could be classified as follows: bargadars 9.17%, patta (document) holders 17.57%, small farmers (possessing land between 1 and 2 hectares) 8.52%, marginal farmers (possessing land up to 1 hectare) 22.36% and agricultural labourers 42.39%.

In 2003-04 net area sown Barjora CD Block was 19,806 hectares and the area in which more than one crop was grown was 6,025 hectares.

In 2013-14, the total area irrigated in Barjora CD block was 8,247 hectares, out of which 3,043 hectares was by canal water, 660 hectares by tank water, 1,320 hectares by river lift irrigation, 224 hectares by deep tubewells, 2,089 hectares by shallow tubewell, 112 hectares by open dug wells and 799 hectares by other methods.

In 2013-14, Barjora CD block produced 44,594 tonnes of Aman paddy, the main winter crop, from 16,611 hectares, 853 tonnes of Aus paddy from 300 hectares, 414 tonnes of Boro paddy from 122 hectares, 345 tonnes of wheat from 195 hectares and 69,208,000 tonnes of potatoes from 2,135 hectares. It also produced pulses and mustard.

=== Handloom and pottery industries ===
The handloom industry engages the largest number of persons in the non farm sector and hence is important in Bankura district. The handloom industry is well established in all the CD blocks of the district and includes the famous Baluchari saris. In 2004-05 Barjora CD block had 256 looms in operation.

Bankura district is famous for the artistic excellence of its pottery products that include the famous Bankura horse. The range of pottery products is categorised as follows: domestic utilities, terracota and other decorative items and roofing tiles and other heavy pottery items. Around 3,200 families were involved in pottery making in the district in 2002. 160 families were involved in Barjora CD block.

=== Banking ===
In 2013-14, Barjora CD block had offices of 13 commercial banks and 3 gramin banks.

=== Backward Regions Grant Fund ===
The Bankura district is listed as a backward region and receives financial support from the Backward Regions Grant Fund. The fund, created by the Government of India, is designed to redress regional imbalances in development. As of 2012, 272 districts across the country were listed under this scheme. The list includes 11 districts of West Bengal.

== Transport ==
In 2013-14, Barjora CD block had 8 originating/ terminating bus routes.

DEMU services are available between Bankura and Masagram on the Bankura-Masagram line. There are stations at Chander and Beliatore.

State Highway 8 (West Bengal) running from Santaldih (in Purulia district) to Majhdia (in Nadia district) and State Highway 9 (West Bengal) running from Durgapur (in Paschim Bardhaman district) to Nayagram (in Jhargram district) pass through this CD block.

== Education ==
In 2013-14, Barjora CD block had 193 primary schools with 11,957 students, 31 middle schools with 3,628 students, 11 high schools with 7,920 students and 14 higher secondary schools with 11,375 students. Barjora CD block had 2 general colleges with 2,889 students, 2 professional/ technical institution with 116 students and 290 institutions for special and non-formal education with 8,390 students. Barjora CD block had 9 mass literacy centres.

See also – Education in India

According to the 2011 census, in the Barjora CD block, among the 182 inhabited villages, 32 villages did not have a school, 39 villages had two or more primary schools, 48 villages had at least 1 primary and 1 middle school and 17 villages had at least 1 middle and 1 secondary school.

Barjora College at Barjora was established in 1985.

Jamini Roy College was established at Beliatore in 1986.

== Healthcare ==
In 2014, Barjora CD block had 1 rural hospital, 4 primary health centres and 1 private nursing home with total 63 beds and 7 doctors. It had 36 family welfare sub centres and 1 family welfare centre. 4,909 patients were treated indoor and 126,570 patients were treated outdoor in the hospitals, health centres and subcentres of the CD block.

Barjora Rural Hospital, with 30 beds at Barjora, is the major government medical facility in the Barjora CD block. There are primary health centres at Beliatore (with 10 beds), Chhandar (with 4 beds), Godardihi (Jagannathpur) (with 4 beds) and Pakhanna (with 10 beds).
