= Raipur, Bankura =

Raipur
- Census Town
- Location in West Bengal, India Raipur (India)
- Coordinates: 22°48′00.0″N 86°57′00.0″E
- Country: India
- State: West Bengal
- District: Bankura

Area
  - Total: 2.4242 km^{2} (0.9360 sq mi)

Population (2011)
  - Total: 6,280
  - Density: 2,590/km^{2} (6,710/sq mi)

Languages*
  - Official: Bengali, English
- Time zone: UTC+5:30 (IST)
- PIN: 722134 (Garhraipur)
- Telephone/STD code: 03243
- Lok Sabha constituency: Bankura
- Vidhan Sabha constituency: Raipur
- Website: raipurdevelopmentblock.in

Raipur, referred to in census reports as Raipur Bazar, is a census town in the Raipur CD block in the Khatra subdivision of the Bankura district in the state of West Bengal, India.

== History ==
In the 14th century, Raipur was a part of Tungbhum.

== Geography ==
Places in Khatra subdivision in Bankura district
CT: census town, R: rural/ urban centre, C: craft centre, T: ancient/ temple centre
Owing to space constraints in the small map, the actual locations in a larger map may vary slightly

=== Location ===
Raipur is located at 22°48′00.0″N 86°57′00.0″E.

=== Area overview ===
The map alongside shows the Khatra subdivision of Bankura district. Physiographically, this area is having uneven lands with hard rocks. In the Khatra CD block area there are some low hills. The Kangsabati project reservoir is prominently visible in the map. The subdued patches of shaded area in the map show forested areas It is an almost fully rural area.

Note: The map alongside presents some of the notable locations in the subdivision. All places marked in the map are linked in the larger full screen map.

== Demographics ==
According to the 2011 Census of India, Raipur Bazar had a total population of 6,280 of which 3,232 (51%) were males and 3,048 (49%) were females. Population below 6 years was 622. The total number of literates in Raipur Bazar was 4,734 (83.67% of the population over 6 years).

.*For language details see Raipur, Bankura (community development block)#Language and religion

== Civic administration ==
=== Police station ===
Raipur police station has jurisdiction over Raipur CD block. The area covered is 252.55 km^{2} with a population of 105,826.

=== CD block HQ ===
The headquarters of Raipur CD block are located at Garh Raipur.

== Infrastructure ==
According to the District Census Handbook 2011, Bankura, Raipur Bazar covered an area of 2.4242 km^{2}. Among the civic amenities, the protected water supply involved tap water from treated sources, covered well. It had 538 domestic electric connections. Among the educational facilities it had were 4 primary schools, 3 senior secondary schools, the nearest general degree college at Bargari 10 km away.

== Transport ==
State Highway 4 running from Jhalda (in Purulia district) to Digha foreshore (in Purba Medinipur district) and State Highway 9 from Durgapur (in Paschim Bardhaman district) to Nayagram (in Jhargram district) cross at Raipur Sabuj Bazar. Raipur located between Bankura and Jhargram (Distance form both city is 60 km).

== Education ==
Garh Raipur High School is a Bengali-medium coeducational institution established in 1937. It has facilities for teaching from class V to class XII. The school has 26 computers, a library with 1,200 books and a playground. This is one of the fourteen schools in Bankura district in which the opening of an Olchiki medium section (for Santali language) from class V was sanctioned in 2012.

Garh Raipur Girls' High School (HS) is a female only high school in this area.

Pandit Raghunath Murmu Abasik School, Dundar, is a Bengali-medium coeducational institution established in 2005. It has facilities for teaching from class V to class XII. The school has 2 computers, a library with 256 books and a playground.

Raipur Block Mahavidyalaya at Kharigerya was established in 2010. It is affiliated to the Bankura University and offers honours courses in Bengali, Santali and history.

Pandit Raghunath Murmu Smriti Mahavidyalaya was established at Baragari in 1986. The college is named after Pandit Raghunath Murmu who invented the "Ol Chiki" script used in Santali language. The college is affiliated to the Bankura University, It offers honours courses in Bengali, Santali, English, Sanskrit, geography, history, political science, philosophy and computer science. It also has general courses in science and arts.

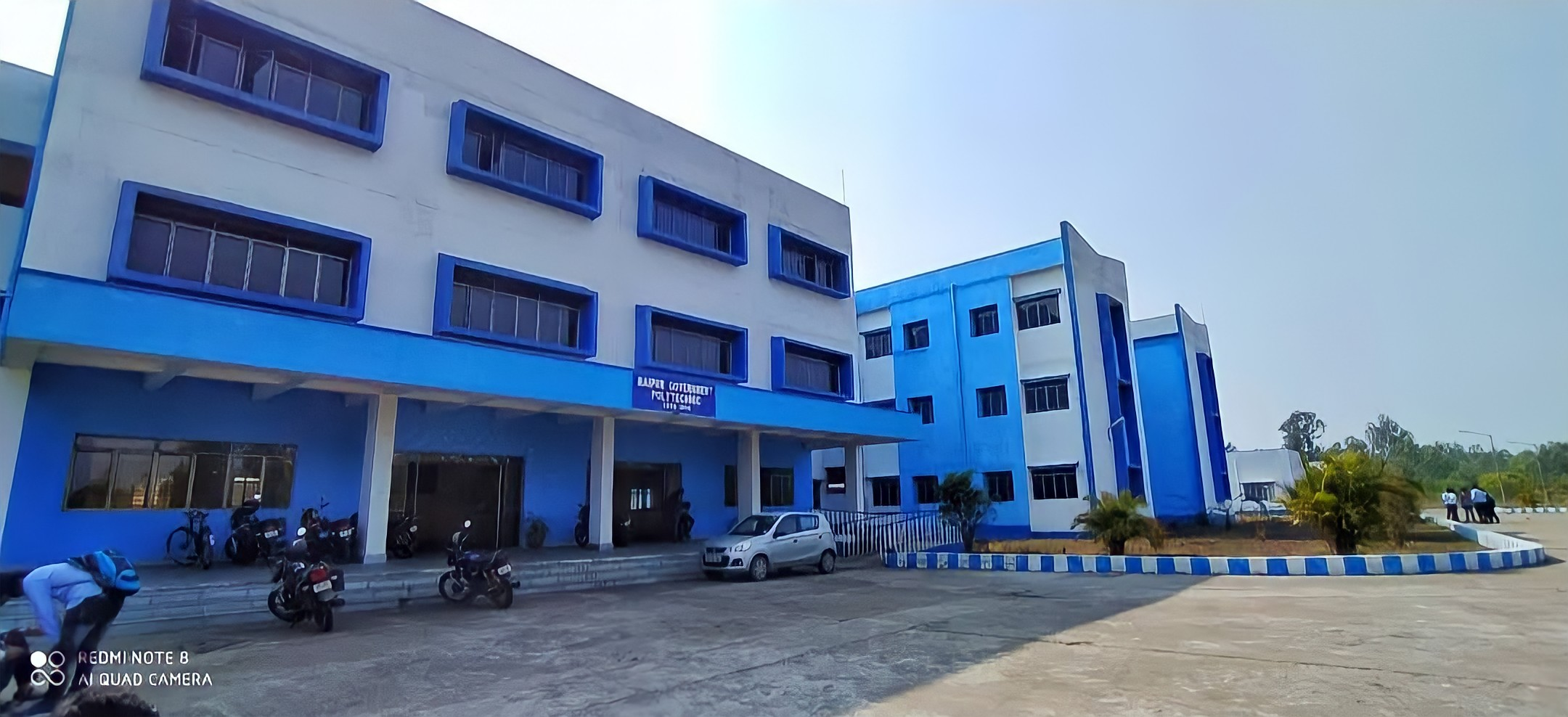

Raipur Government Polytechnic is the only Polytechnic college in Raipur Block. This was established in 2016 at Siromonipur near Raipur.

== Healthcare ==
Raipur Rural Hospital, with 30 beds at Nutangarh, is the major government medical facility in the Raipur CD block. There are primary health centres at Matgoda (with 6 beds) and Phulkusma (with 10 beds).
