= Mandankuli =

Mandalkuli Mandalkuli
- Village
- Location in West Bengal, India Mandalkuli (India)
- Coordinates: 22.7436°N 86.9144°E
- Country: India
- State: West Bengal
- District: Bankura

Population (2011)
  - Total: 4,011

Languages
  - Official: Bengali, Santali, English
- Time zone: UTC+5:30 (IST)
- PIN: 722134
- Telephone/STD code: 03243
- Lok Sabha constituency: Bankura
- Vidhan Sabha constituency: Raipur
- Website: bankura.gov.in

Mandalkuli (also referred to as Mandalkuli) is a village and a gram panchayat in the Raipur CD block in the Khatra subdivision of the Bankura district in the state of West Bengal, India.

== Geography ==
Places in Khatra subdivision in Bankura district
CT: census town, R: rural/ urban centre, C: craft centre, T: ancient/ temple centre
Owing to space constraints in the small map, the actual locations in a larger map may vary slightly

=== Location ===
Mandankuli is located at 22.7436°N 86.9144°E.

Note: The map alongside presents some of the notable locations in the subdivision. All places marked in the map are linked in the larger full screen map.

== Demographics ==
According to the 2011 Census of India, Mandankuli had a total population of 4,011, of which 2,066 (52%) were males and 1,945 (48%) were females. There were 452 persons in the age range of 0–6 years. The total number of literate persons in Mandankuli was 2,353 (66.11% of the population over 6 years).

== Education ==
Mandalkuli Netaji Vidyapith is a Bengali-medium coeducational institution established in 1935. It has facilities for teaching from class V to class XII. The school has 10 computers, a library with 50 books and a playground. This is one of the fourteen schools in Bankura district in which the opening of an Olchiki medium section (for Santali language) from class V was sanctioned in 2012.

Raipur Block Mahavidyalaya was established in 2010 at Kharigerya. It is affiliated with the Bankura University and offers honours courses in Bengali, Santali and history.

== Culture ==
According to Binoy Ghosh, Mandalkuli must have been a Jain centre similar to Ambikanagar or Dharapat, but the large collection of statues that one sees at Mandalkuli is not there elsewhere in Bankura district. It is there only in Purulia district. When Binoy Ghosh visited the place in 1968, he saw statues of Jain, Buddhist and Hindu deities. He says that it was possibly a Jain or Buddhist centre earlier and later taken over by resurgent Hinduism.
