= State Highway 9 (West Bengal) =

Road in West Bengal, India

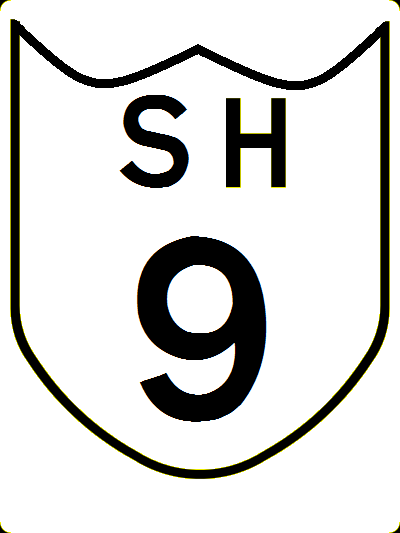
State Highway 9
- Durgapur Bankura road (partially)

Route information
- Maintained by PWD West Bengal
- Length: 251 km (156 mi)

Major junctions
- North end: Durgapur
- NH 19 From Muchipara, Durgapur SH 8 from Beliatore to Bankura; NH 14 from Bikna to Dhaldanga; SH 4 from Raipur Bazar to Pirolgari morh SH 2 at Baralaksmanpur; SH 5 from Silda to Narayanpur; NH 49 from Chichra to Fekohaat
- South end: Nayagram

Location
- Country: India
- State: West Bengal
- Districts: Paschim Bardhaman, Bankura, Jhargram

Highway system
- Roads in India; Expressways; National; State; Asian; State Highways in West Bengal

State Highway 9 (West Bengal) is a state highway in West Bengal, India.

== Route ==
SH 9 route in red colour

SH 9 originates from Durgapur and passes through Barjora, Beliatore, Bikna, Bankura, Taldangra, Simlapal, Raipur Bazar, Matgoda, Phulkusma, Silda, Gidhni, Chilkigarh, Gopiballavpur, Chhatinasol and terminates at Nayagram.

The total length of SH 9 is 251 km.

Districts traversed by SH 9 are:
Paschim Bardhaman district (0 – 7 km)
Bankura district (7 – 89 km)
Jhargram district (89 – 251 km)

== Major Locations on State Highway ==
=== Paschim Bardhaman:- ===
- Durgapur

=== Bankura :- ===
- Barjora
- Beliator
- Bankura
- Simlapal
- Raipur
- Matgoda
- Phulkusma

=== Jhargram:- ===
- Benagaria
- Dharsa
- Fekohaat
- Nayangram

== Toll Plazas ==
The only toll plaza is in Pratappur on the Bankura bank of Damodar just after the Durgapur Barrage and is named as Durgapur Toll Plaza. The toll plaza is 6 laned and is yet to start post the expansion of the Durgapur part of the Highway to 4 lane highway.

== Future Plans ==
The section of the highway from Muchipara to Durgapur barrage is being 4 laned as per the decisions taken by the West Bengal Government in 2017. Under this project, several new bridges are being constructed. The rail over bridge was also made operational for about a year now. A whole new 4 Laned wide bridge is planned as a substitute for the shaky Durgapur Barrage which was not repaired even once since its construction in 1950. The barrage has developed cracks and is hazardous now. Owing to these reasons a whole new bridge is under construction and hopefully will be complete in 3 years. The work of four landing is at its peak. The entire road would be wide 4 laned with street light mounted dividers with a railing. The road would also possess a footpath along its entire length. There would be bus stops on sides and traffic signals to control the heavy traffic of the Durgapur flank of this road.

== Road sections ==
It is divided into different sections as follows:.

Road Section	District	CD Block	Length (km)
Muchipara NH 19-Durgapur Barrage	Paschim Bardhaman	-	7
Durgapur Barrage-Bankura	Bankura	Barjora, Bankura II	42
Bankura-Taldangra-Simlapal	Bankura	Bankura I, Onda, Taldangra, Simlapal	40
Simlapal-Krishnapur-Raipur-Fulkusma-Benagaria	Bankura, Jhargram	Sarenga, Raipur	37
Benagaria-Silda	Jhargram	Binpur II	8
Silda-Narayanpur (common route with SH 5	Jhargram	Binpur II	
Narayanpur-Dharsa-Fekohaat	Jhargram	Jamboni	34
Fekohaat-Nayagram	Jhargram	Gopiballavpur I, Gopiballavpur II, Nayagram	54

== See also ==
- List of state highways in West Bengal
