= Raipur, Bankura (community development block) =

Raipur
- Community development block
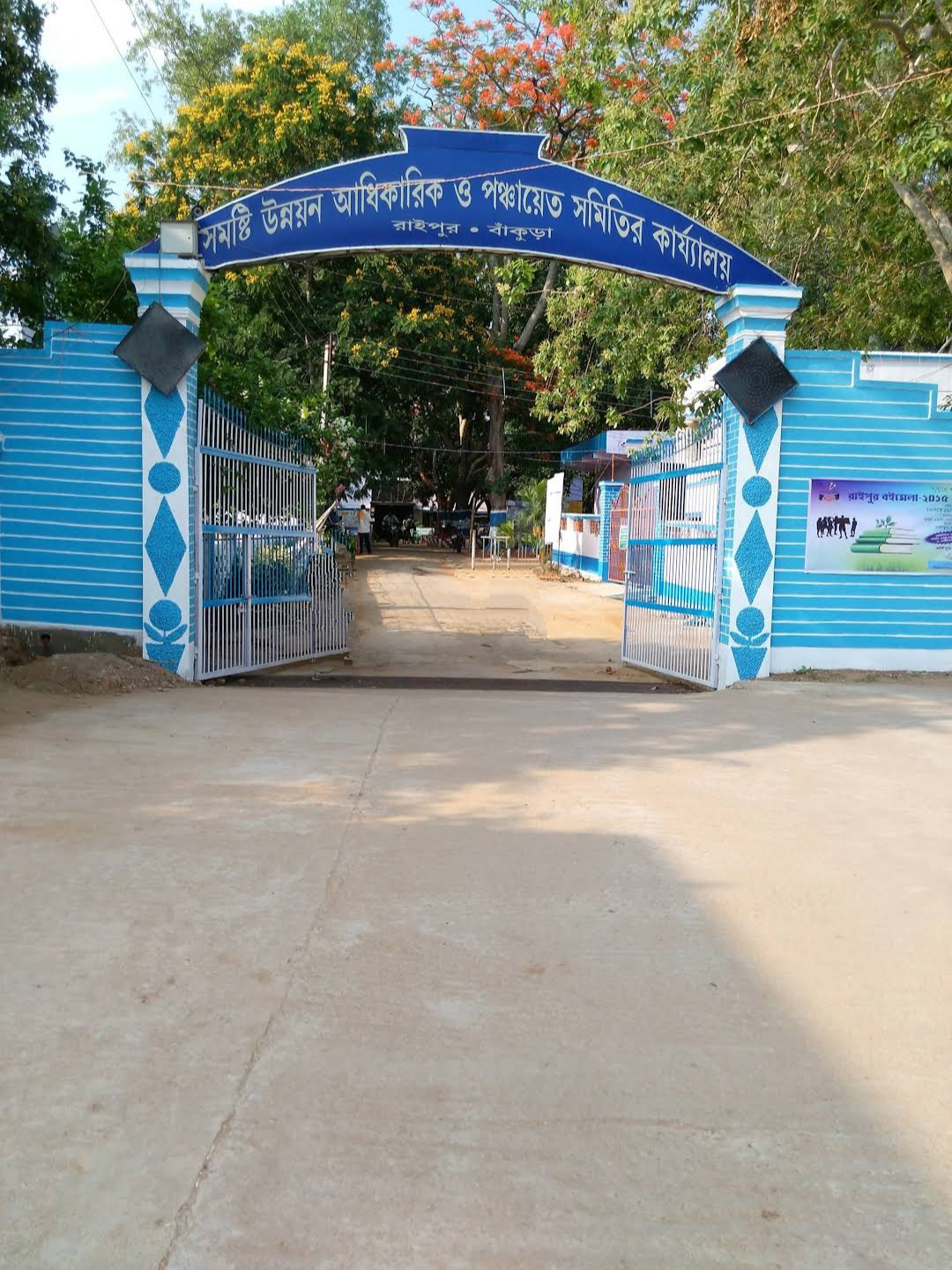
- Raipur BDO Office Main Entrance

- Coordinates: 22.80°N 86.95°E
- Country: India
- State: West Bengal
- District: Bankura

Government
  - Type: Representative democracy

Area
  - Total: 364.40 km^{2} (140.70 sq mi)
- Elevation: 79 m (259 ft)

Population (2011)
  - Total: 171,377
  - Density: 470.30/km^{2} (1,218.1/sq mi)

Languages
  - Official: Bengali, English
- Time zone: UTC+5:30 (IST)
- PIN: 722134 (Garhraipur); 722162 (Fulkusma)
- Telephone/STD code: 03243
- ISO 3166 code: IN-WB
- Vehicle registration: WB-67, WB-68
- Literacy: 71.33%
- Lok Sabha constituency: Bankura
- Vidhan Sabha constituency: Raipur
- Website: raipurdevelopmentblock.in

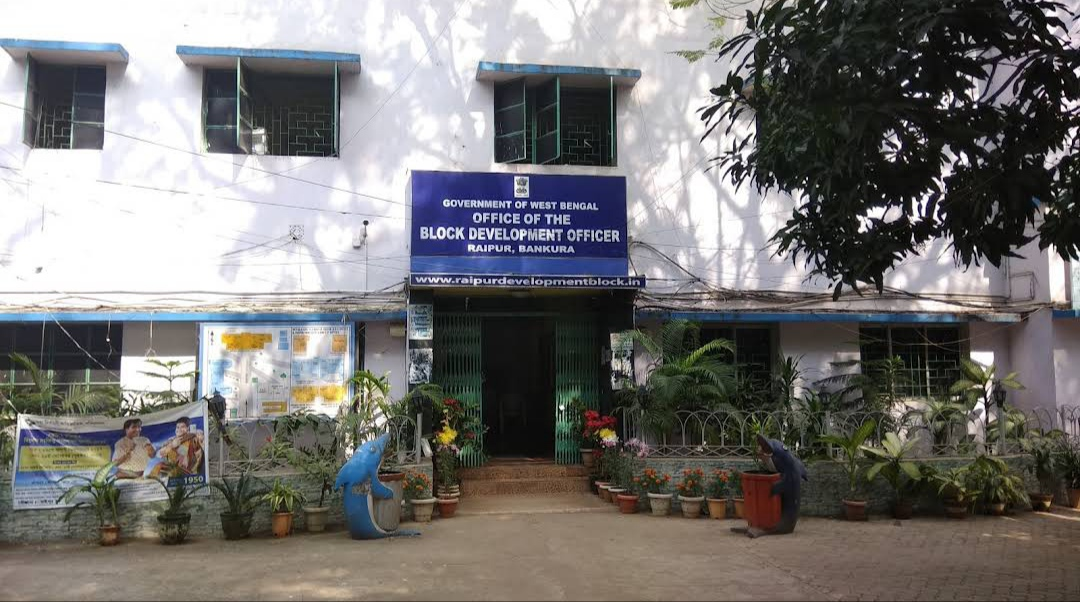
Raipur BDO Office Main Building

Raipur is a community development block (CD block) that forms an administrative division in the Khatra subdivision of the Bankura district in the Indian state of West Bengal.

== History ==
=== From Bishnupur kingdom to the British Raj ===
From around the 7th century AD till around the advent of British rule, for around a millennium, history of Bankura district is identical with the rise and fall of the Hindu Rajas of Bishnupur. The Bishnupur Rajas, who were at the summit of their fortunes towards the end of the 17th century, started declining in the first half of the 18th century. First, the Maharaja of Burdwan seized the Fatehpur Mahal, and then the Maratha invasions laid waste their country.

Bishnupur was ceded to the British with the rest of Burdwan chakla in 1760. In 1787, Bishnupur was united with Birbhum to form a separate administrative unit. In 1793 it was transferred to the Burdwan collectorate. In 1879, the district acquired its present shape with the thanas of Khatra and Raipur and the outpost of Simplapal being transferred from Manbhum, and the thanas of Sonamukhi, Kotulpur and Indas being retransferred from Burdwan. However, it was known for sometime as West Burdwan and in 1881 came to be known as Bankura district.

=== Red corridor ===
106 districts spanning 10 states across India, described as being part of the Left wing extremism activities, constitutes the Red corridor. In West Bengal the districts of Paschim Medinipur, Bankura, Purulia and Birbhum are part of the Red corridor. However, as of July 2016, there had been no reported incidents of Maoist related activities from these districts for the previous 4 years.

The CPI (Maoist) extremism which started in the district in the mid-nineties was mainly concentrated in five police station areas of Khatra subdivision – Sarenga, Barikul, Ranibandh, Raipur and Simlapal. They also functioned across the adjoining areas of Paschim Medinipur and Purulia districts.

The Lalgarh movement, which started attracting attention after the failed assassination attempt on Buddhadeb Bhattacharjee, then chief minister of West Bengal, in the Salboni area of Paschim Medinipur district, on 2 November 2008 and the police action that followed, had also spread over to these areas. The movement was not just a political struggle but an armed struggle that concurrently took the look of a social struggle. A large number of CPI (M) activists were killed. Although the epi-centre of the movement was Lalgarh, it was spread across 19 police stations in three adjoining districts – Paschim Medinipur, Bankura and Purulia, all thickly forested and near the border with Jharkhand. The deployment of CRPF and other forces started on 11 June 2009. The movement came to an end after the 2011 state assembly elections and change of government in West Bengal. The death of Kishenji, the Maoist commander, on 24 November 2011 was the last major landmark.

== Geography ==
Map of Bankura District showing CD blocks and municipalities

Raipur is located at 22°48′N 86°57′E.

Raipur CD block is located in the south-eastern part of the district and belongs to the hard rock area. There are picturesque low hills, locally called masaker pahar. Western part of Raipur block is actually a part of Chota Nagpur Plateau.

Raipur CD block is bounded by Khatra CD block on the north, Sarenga CD block on the east, Binpur II CD block, in Paschim Medinipur, on the south and Ranibandh CD block on the west.

Raipur CD block has an area of 369.92 km^{2}. It has 1 panchayat samity, 10 gram panchayats, 131 gram sansads (village councils), 206 mouzas, 197 inhabited villages and 1 census town. Raipur police station serves this block. Headquarters of this CD block is at Gar Raipur.

Gram panchayats of Raipur block/ panchayat samiti are: Dundar, Dhanara, Dheko, Mandankuli, Matgoda, Melera, Phulkusma, Raipur, Shyamsundarpur and Sonagara.

== Demographics ==
=== Population ===
According to the 2011 Census of India, Raipur CD block had a total population of 171,377, of which 165,097 were rural and 6,280 were urban. There were 87,339 (51%) males and 84,038 (49%) females. Population in the age range of 0 to 6 years was 19,702. Scheduled Castes numbered 37,457 (21.86%) and Scheduled Tribes numbered 47,398 (27.66%).

According to the 2001 census, Raipur block had a total population of 151,274, out of which 77,184 were males and 74,090 were females. Raipur block registered a population growth of 40.13 per cent during the 1991-2001 decade. Decadal growth for the district was 13.79 per cent. Decadal growth in West Bengal was 17.84 per cent.

Census Towns in Raipur CD block are (2011 census figures in brackets): Raipur Bazar (6,280).

Large villages (with 4,000+ population) in Raipur CD block are (2011 census figures in brackets): Matgoda (5,197), Mandankuli (4,011) and Phulkusma (4,003).

Other villages in Raipur CD block are (2011 census figures in brackets): Melera (2,066), Shyamsundarpur (2,268), Sonagara (2,395), Dundar (1,677), Dhanara (1,832) and Dheko (1,537).

=== Literacy ===
According to the 2011 census, the total number of literates in Raipur CD block was 108,188 (71.33% of the population over 6 years) out of which males numbered 63,645 (82.53% of the male population over 6 years) and females numbered 44,543 (59.74%) of the female population over 6 years). The gender disparity (the difference between female and male literacy rates) was 22.79%.

See also – List of West Bengal districts ranked by literacy rate

Literacy in CD blocks of
Bankura district
Bankura Sadar subdivision
Saltora – 61.45%
Mejia – 66.83%
Gangajalghati – 68.11%
Chhatna – 65.73%
Bankura I – 68.74%
Bankura II – 73.59%
Barjora – 71.67%
Onda – 65.82%
Bishnupur subdivision
Indas – 71.70%
Joypur – 74.57%
Patrasayer – 64.8%
Kotulpur – 78.01%
Sonamukhi – 66.16%
Bishnupur – 66.30%
Khatra subdivision
Indpur – 67.42%
Ranibandh – 68.53%
Khatra – 72.18%
Hirbandh – 64.18%
Raipur – 71.33%
Sarenga – 74.25%
Simlapal – 68.44%
Taldangra – 70.87%
2011 Census: CD Block Wise

Primary Census Abstract Data

=== Language and religion ===
Religion in Raipur CD block (2011)
Hinduism	70.76%
Other (tribal religion)	27.66%
Islam	1.30%
Other or not stated	0.28%

In the 2011 census Hindus numbered 121,261 and formed 70.76% of the population in Raipur CD block. Muslims numbered 2,221 and formed 1.30% of the population. Others numbered 47,895 and formed 27.95% of the population. Others include Addi Bassi, Marang Boro, Santal, Saranath, Sari Dharma, Sarna, Alchchi, Bidin, Sant, Saevdharm, Seran, Saran, Sarin, Kheria, and other religious communities. In 2001, Hindus were 68.93%, Muslims 1.19% and tribal religions 29.76% of the population respectively.

Languages of Raipur CD block (2011)
1. Bengali (72.2%)
2. Santali (22.9%)
3. Kurmali (4.85%)
4. Others (0.09%)

At the time of the 2011 census, 72.21% of the population spoke Bengali, 22.85% Santali and 4.85% Kurmali as their first language.

== Rural poverty ==
In Raipur CD block, 49.98% families were living below poverty line in 2007. According to the Rural Household Survey in 2005, 28.87% of the total number of families were BPL families in the Bankura district.

Migration has been observed in the following CD blocks of Bankura district: Bankura I, Chhatna, Saltora, Indpur, Ranibandh, Hirbandh, Khatra, Raipur and Sarenga. Although authentic figures are not available, a sample survey has been done. According to the sample survey, around 54.5% to 85.4% of the families on an average migrate from these blocks. Another study shows that around 23% of the people from the under-privileged blocks in the western and southern Bankura migrate. Those migrating belong mostly to the SC or ST population. They migrate for periods varying from 15 days to 6/8 months. Most people migrate to meet their food deficit and go to Bardhaman and Hooghly districts but some go to Gujarat and Maharashtra as construction labour.

== Economy ==
=== Livelihood ===
Livelihood
in Raipur CD block
1. Cultivators (23.4%)
2. Agricultural labourers (58.7%)
3. Household industries (2.90%)
4. Other Workers (15.0%)

In the Raipur CD block in 2011, among the class of total workers, cultivators numbered 18,316 and formed 23.41%, agricultural labourers numbered 45,944 and formed 58.73%, household industry workers numbered 2,269 and formed 2.90% and other workers numbered 11,704 and formed 14.96%. Total workers numbered 78,233 and formed 45.65% of the total population, and non-workers numbered 93,144 and formed 54.35% of the population.

Note: In the census records a person is considered a cultivator, if the person is engaged in cultivation/ supervision of land owned by self/government/institution. When a person who works on another person's land for wages in cash or kind or share, is regarded as an agricultural labourer. Household industry is defined as an industry conducted by one or more members of the family within the household or village, and one that does not qualify for registration as a factory under the Factories Act. Other workers are persons engaged in some economic activity other than cultivators, agricultural labourers and household workers. It includes factory, mining, plantation, transport and office workers, those engaged in business and commerce, teachers, entertainment artistes and so on.

=== Infrastructure ===
There are 197 inhabited villages in the Raipur CD block, as per the District Census Handbook, Bankura, 2011. 100% villages have power supply. 192 villages (97.46%) have drinking water supply. 25 villages (12.69%) have post offices. 132 villages (67.01%) have telephones (including landlines, public call offices and mobile phones). 59 villages (29.95%) have pucca (paved) approach roads and 69 villages (35.03%) have transport communication (includes bus service, private pool car services, toto services, 17 villages (8.63%) have agricultural credit societies and 5 villages (2.54%) have banks.

=== Agriculture ===
There were 69 fertiliser depots, 13 seed stores and 67 fair price shops in the CD block.

In 2013–2014, persons engaged in agriculture in Raipur CD block could be classified as follows: bargadars 2.31%, patta (document) holders 18.47%, small farmers (possessing land between 1 and 2 hectares) 5.25%, marginal farmers (possessing land up to 1 hectare) 18.47% and agricultural labourers 55.50%.

In 2003-2004 net area sown Raipur CD block was 11,256 hectares and the area in which more than one crop was grown was 10,682 hectares.

In 2013–2014, the total area irrigated in Raipur CD block was 18,927 hectares, out of which 14,072 hectares was by canal water, 2,030 hectares by tank water, 1,360 hectares by river lift irrigation, 385 hectares by shallow tubewell, 480 hectares by open dug wells and 600 hectares by other methods.

In 2013–2014, Raipur CD block produced 44,430 tonnes of Aman paddy, the main winter crop, from 16,373 hectares, 84 tonnes of Aus paddy from 31 hectares, 840 tonnes of Boro paddy from 363 hectares, 939 tonnes of wheat from 666 hectares and 39,760,000 tonnes of potatoes from 1,883 hectares. It also produced maize, pulses and mustard.

=== Handloom and pottery industries ===
The handloom industry engages the largest number of persons in the non farm sector and hence is important in Bankura district. The handloom industry is well established in all the CD blocks of the district and includes the famous Baluchari saris. In 2004-05 Raipur CD block had 251 looms in operation.

Bankura district is famous for the artistic excellence of its pottery products that include the famous Bankura horse. The range of pottery products is categorised as follows: domestic utilities, terracota and other decorative items and roofing tiles and other heavy pottery items. Around 3,200 families were involved in pottery making in the district in 2002. 128 families were involved in Raipur CD Block.

=== Banking ===
In 2013–2014, Raipur CD block had offices of 6 commercial banks and 4 gramin banks.

=== Backward Regions Grant Fund ===
The Bankura district is listed as a backward region and receives financial support from the Backward Regions Grant Fund. The fund, created by the Government of India, is designed to redress regional imbalances in development. As of 2012, 272 districts across the country were listed under this scheme. The list includes 11 districts of West Bengal.

== Transport ==
In 2013–2014, Raipur CD block had 11 originating/ terminating bus routes. The nearest railway station is 65 km from the CD Block headquarters.

State Highway 4 running from Jhalda (in Purulia district) to Digha foreshore (in Purba Medinipur district) and State Highway 9 from Durgapur (in Paschim Bardhaman district) to Nayagram (in Jhargram district) cross at Raipur Bazar.

== Education ==
In 2013–14, Raipur CD block had 199 primary schools with 15,846 students, 15 middle schools with 2,229 students, 3 high schools with 1,506 students and 26 higher secondary schools with 18,346 students. Raipur CD block had 1 Engineering College With 295 students and 1 general college with 1,084 students and 465 institutions for special and non-formal education with 8,013 students.

According to the 2011 census, in the Raipur CD block, among the 197 inhabited villages, 25 villages did not have a school, 47 villages had two or more primary schools, 52 villages had at least 1 primary and 1 middle school and 29 villages had at least 1 middle and 1 secondary school.

Raipur Government Polytechnic was established in 2016 at Siromonipur near Raipur.

Pandit Raghunath Murmu Smriti Mahavidyalaya was established in 1986 at Baragari village near the Pirolgari Morh crossing of SH 4 and SH 9.

Raipur Block Mahavidyalaya was established in 2010 at Kharigerya.

Garh Raipur High School (Higher Secondary) is a renowned High School In Raipur Block

== Healthcare ==
In 2014, Raipur CD block had 1 rural hospital and 3 primary health centres with total 64 beds and 10 doctors. It had 33 family welfare sub centres and 1 family welfare centre. 7,658 patients were treated indoor and 153,930 patients were treated outdoor in the hospitals, health centres and subcentres of the CD block.

Raipur Rural Hospital, with 30 beds at Nutangarh, is the major government medical facility in the Raipur CD block. There are primary health centres at Matgoda (with 6 beds) and Phulkusma (with 10 beds).
