= Mrityunjoy Murmu =

Indian politician from West Bengal

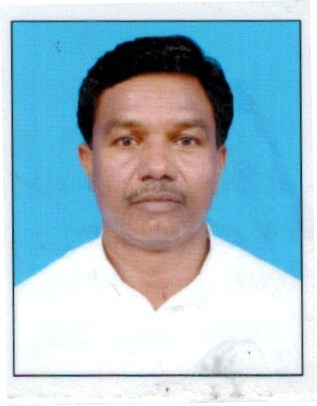
- Mrityunjay Murmu

Member of the West Bengal Legislative Assembly
- Incumbent
- Assumed office 2 May 2021
- Preceded by: Birendra Nath Tudu
- Succeeded by: Kshetra Mohan Hansda
- Constituency: Raipur

Personal details
- Born: Raipur, West Bengal, India
- Party: All India Trinamool Congress
- Spouse: Kalyani Murmu
- Profession: Politician

Mrityunjoy Murmu is an Indian politician from All India Trinamool Congress. In May 2021, he was elected as the member of the West Bengal Legislative Assembly from Raipur, Bankura (Vidhan Sabha constituency).

== Personal life ==
Murmu is from Raipur, Bankura district, West Bengal. His father's name is Junilal Murmu. He passed H.S. from Napara High School in 1994.

== Political life ==
He has been elected as the member of the West Bengal Legislative Assembly from Raipur, Bankura (Vidhan Sabha constituency). He has won the election.
