= Susmita Biswas =

Indian politician

Susmita Biswas (born 1963) is an Indian politician from West Bengal. She is a former three time consecutive member of the West Bengal Legislative Assembly from Barjora Assembly constituency in Bankura district. She was last elected in the 2006 West Bengal Legislative Assembly election representing the Communist Party of India (Marxist).

== Early life and education ==
Biswas is from Barjora, Bankura district, West Bengal. Her husband was late Dilip Biswas. She completed her graduation in arts. She was a former councillor from South Dum Dum municipality.

== Career ==
Biswas was elected as an MLA for the first time in the 1996 West Bengal Legislative Assembly election from Barjora Assembly constituency representing the Communist Party of India (Marxist). She polled votes 73,859 votes and defeated her nearest rival, Shampa Daripa of the All India Trinamool Congress, by a margin of 20,476 votes. She retained the seat for the Communist Party in the next election winning the 2001 West Bengal Legislative Assembly election. In 2001, she polled 126,787 votes and beat her closest opponent, Sudhanghshu Sekhar Tewari of the All India Trinamool Congress, by a margin of 9,821 votes. She was elected for the third consecutive term in the 2006 West Bengal Legislative Assembly election. In 2006, she polled 73,859 votes and defeated her nearest rival Shampa Daripa of the All India Trinamool Congress by a margin of 20,476 votes. In the 2011 West Bengal Legislative Assembly election she lost to Asutosh Mukherjee of the Trinamool Congress.
