= Khakharechi =

Khakhrechi
- Village
- Interactive map of Khakhrechi
- Coordinates: 23.0825°N 70.9175°E
- Elevation: 6 m (20 ft)

Population (2011)
  - Total: 4,950
- Time zone: UTC+ 5:30 (IST)
- Pin Code: 363630
- Area codes: 02822

Khakhrechi is a village of Malia and Rathore communities in Gujarat, India.
