= Billeswar Sinha =

Indian politician (born 1980)

Billeswar Sinha (born 1980) is an Indian politician from West Bengal. He is a member of the West Bengal Legislative Assembly from the Barjora Assembly constituency in Bankura district representing the Bharatiya Janata Party.

== Early life and education ==
Sinha is from Barjora, Bankura district, West Bengal. He is the son of the late Subodh Kumar Sinha. He completed his LLB at B.N. Mandal University in 2010, He is an advocate. He declared assets worth Rs.29 lakhs in his affidavit to the Election Commission of India.

== Career ==
Sinha won the Barjora Assembly constituency representing the Bharatiya Janata Party in the 2026 West Bengal Legislative Assembly election. He polled 1,25,419 votes and defeated his nearest rival, Gautam Mishra of the All India Trinamool Congress by a margin of 41,310 votes.
