= Chhatinasol =

- Village
- Location in West Bengal, India Chhatinasol (India)
- Coordinates: 22°11′19.3″N 86°55′34.3″E
- Country: India
- State: West Bengal
- District: Jhargram

Population (2011)
  - Total: 1,040

Languages
  - Official: Bengali, Santali, English
- Time zone: UTC+5:30 (IST)
- PIN: 721506 (Gopiballavpur)
- Telephone/STD code: 03221
- Lok Sabha constituency: Jhargram
- Vidhan Sabha constituency: Nayagram
- Website: jhargram.gov.in

Chhatinasol is a village in the Gopiballavpur I CD block in the Jhargram subdivision of the Jhargram district in the state of West Bengal, India.

== Geography ==
Cities and towns in Jhargram subdivision of Jhargram district
CT: census town, R: rural/ urban centre, H: historical/ religious centre
Owing to space constraints in the small map, the actual locations in a larger map may vary slightly

=== Location ===
Chhatinasol is located at 22°11′19.3″N 86°55′34.3″E.

Jhargram subdivision, the only one in Jhargram district, shown in the map alongside, is composed of hills, mounds and rolling lands. It is rather succinctly described in the District Human Development Report, 2011 (at that time it was part of Paschim Medinipur district), “The western boundary is more broken and picturesque, for the lower ranges of the Chhotanagpur Hills line the horizon, the jungle assumes the character of forest, and large trees begin to predominate. The soil, however, is lateritic, a considerable area is unproductive, almost uninhabited, especially in the extreme north-west where there are several hills over 1000 feet in height. The remainder of the country is an almost level plain broken only by the sand hills.” 3.48% of the population lives in urban areas and 96.52% lives in the rural areas. 20.11% of the total population belonged to scheduled castes and 29.37% belonged to scheduled tribes.

== Demographics ==
According to the 2011 Census of India, Chhatinasol had a total population of 1,040 of which 538 (52%) were males and 502 (48%) were females. Population in the age range 0–6 years was 143. The total number of literate persons in Chhatinasol was 590 (56.73% of the population over 6 years).

== Civic administration ==
=== CD block HQ ===
The headquarters of Gopiballavpur I CD block are located at Chhatinasol.

== Transport ==
State Highway 9 (West Bengal) running from Durgapur (in Paschim Bardhaman district) to Nayagram (in Jhargram district) passes through Chhatinasol.
