= Kshetra Mohan Hansda =

Indian politician

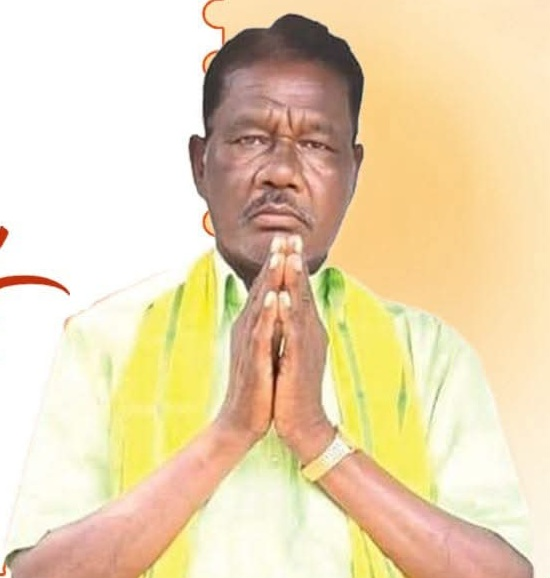

Member of the West Bengal Legislative Assembly
- Incumbent
- Assumed office May 2026
- Preceded by: Mrityunjoy Murmu
- Constituency: Raipur

Personal details
- Born: Bankura, West Bengal, India
- Party: Bharatiya Janata Party

Kshetra Mohan Hansda is an Indian politician and a member of the Bharatiya Janata Party. He was elected as a member of the West Bengal Legislative Assembly from the Raipur constituency (reserved for Scheduled Tribes) in 2026.

== Political career ==
Hansda contested the 2026 West Bengal Legislative Assembly election as a candidate of the Bharatiya Janata Party from the Raipur seat. On 4 May 2026, he was declared the winner, securing 1,11,443 votes. He defeated his nearest rival, Thakurmani Saren of the All India Trinamool Congress, by a margin of 28,742 votes.
