= Maliara =

- Village
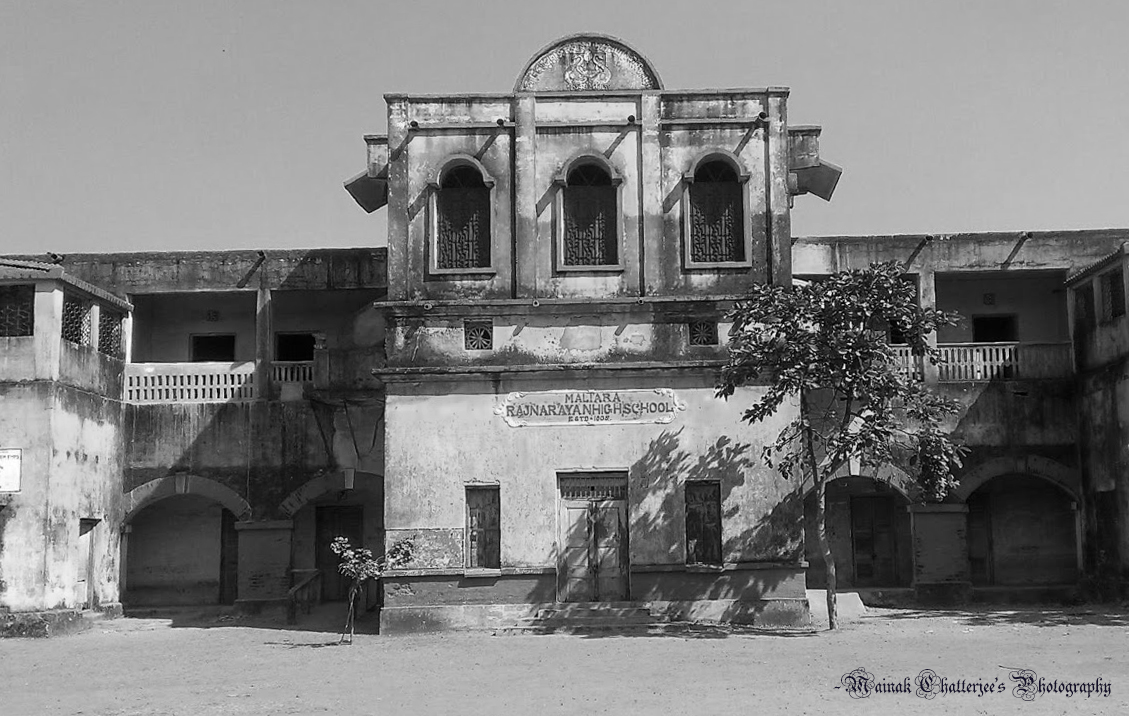
- Maliara Raj Narayan High School

- Location in West Bengal, India Maliara (India)
- Coordinates: 23.475°N 87.223°E
- Country: India
- State: West Bengal
- District: Bankura
- Division: Burdwan
- Block: Barjora

Languages
  - Official: Bengali, English
- Time zone: UTC+5:30 (IST)
- PIN: 722142
- Telephone code: 91-3241

Maliara is a village in Barjora (community development block) in Bankura district of West Bengal State, India. It belongs to Burdwan Division.

== Geography ==
Places in Bankura Sadar subdivision in Bankura district
M: municipal town/ city, CT: census town, R: rural/ urban centre, H: hill centre, T: temple/ religious centre, B: barrage
Owing to space constraints in the small map, the actual locations in a larger map may vary slightly

Maliara is located at 23.475°N 87.223°E.

It is located 38 km towards north of district headquarter Bankura, 8 km from Barjora, 179 km from State capital Kolkata. This area had taken a pioneering role in India's freedom struggle.

Physiographically, this area is part of the Bankura Uplands in the west gradually merging with the Bankura-Bishnupur Rarh Plains in the north-east. The western portions are characterised by undulating terrain with many hills and ridges. The area is having a gradual descent from the Chota Nagpur Plateau. The soil is laterite red and hard beds are covered with scrub jungle and sal wood. Gradually it gives way to just uneven rolling lands but the soil continues to be lateritic. There are coal mines in the northern part, along the Damodar River. It is a predominantly rural area with 89% of the population living in rural areas and only 11% living in the urban areas.

Note: The map alongside presents some of the notable locations in the subdivision. All places marked in the map are linked in the larger full screen map.

== History ==
Many freedom fighters who faced the gallows are the sons of the soil of Maliara to free their motherland from the yokes of bondage, they had willingly sacrificed themselves in the freedom pyre.

Maliara Raj Badi is a place where the last ruling kings of Maliara resided, Now their descendants do reside in this place. Durga puja is celebrated in maliara raj badi by descendants of Raja Niladri Narayan Chandradhurjee. The idol of goddess Durga which is being worshiped is more than 500 years old. A scenic place to view with historic temple in Maliara Bado Rajbadi. The history of Maliara boasts more than 1500 years back wherein the king came from Uttar Pradesh in a horse saving his idols from the intruders and was gifted land in West Bengal. Where he created a village Maliara. Maliara has more than ten lakes, Making it village of lakes in West Bengal. A place to visit particularly in Durga Puja where you could plunge into the festival fever of Maliara Bado Rajbadi.

== Demographics ==
The Maliara village has population of 7918 of which 4057 are males while 3861 are females as per Population Census 2011.

In Maliara village population of children with age 0–6 is 845 which makes up 10.67% of total population of village. Average Sex Ratio of Maliara village is 952 which is higher than West Bengal state average of 950. Child Sex Ratio for the Maliara as per census is 853, lower than West Bengal average of 956.

Maliara village has lower literacy rate compared to West Bengal. In 2011, literacy rate of Maliara village was 70.48% compared to 76.26% of West Bengal. In Maliara Male literacy stands at 78.87% while female literacy rate was 61.78%.

As per constitution of India and Panchyati Raaj Act, Maliara village is administrated by Sarpanch (Head of Village) who is elected representative of village.

== Work Profile ==
In Maliara village out of total population, 3021 were engaged in work activities. 62.16% of workers describe their work as Main Work (Employment or Earning more than 6 Months) while 37.84% were involved in Marginal activity providing livelihood for less than six months. Of 3021 workers engaged in Main Work, 142 were cultivators (owner or co-owner) while 380 were agricultural labourers.

== Religious beliefs and festivals ==
Durga Puja, Kali Puja and Jagaddhatri Puja are the main festivals that are celebrated in Maliara. Maliara Rajbari first started Durga Puja in Maliara in the 17th century and is still celebrated traditionally. In the last few years, local clubs and communities have competed with each other for designing the best Durga Puja murtis (idols), mandaps (interior of abode), and pandals (bamboo and cloth makeshift enclosures) with hundreds of thousands of rupees often being spent by each club.

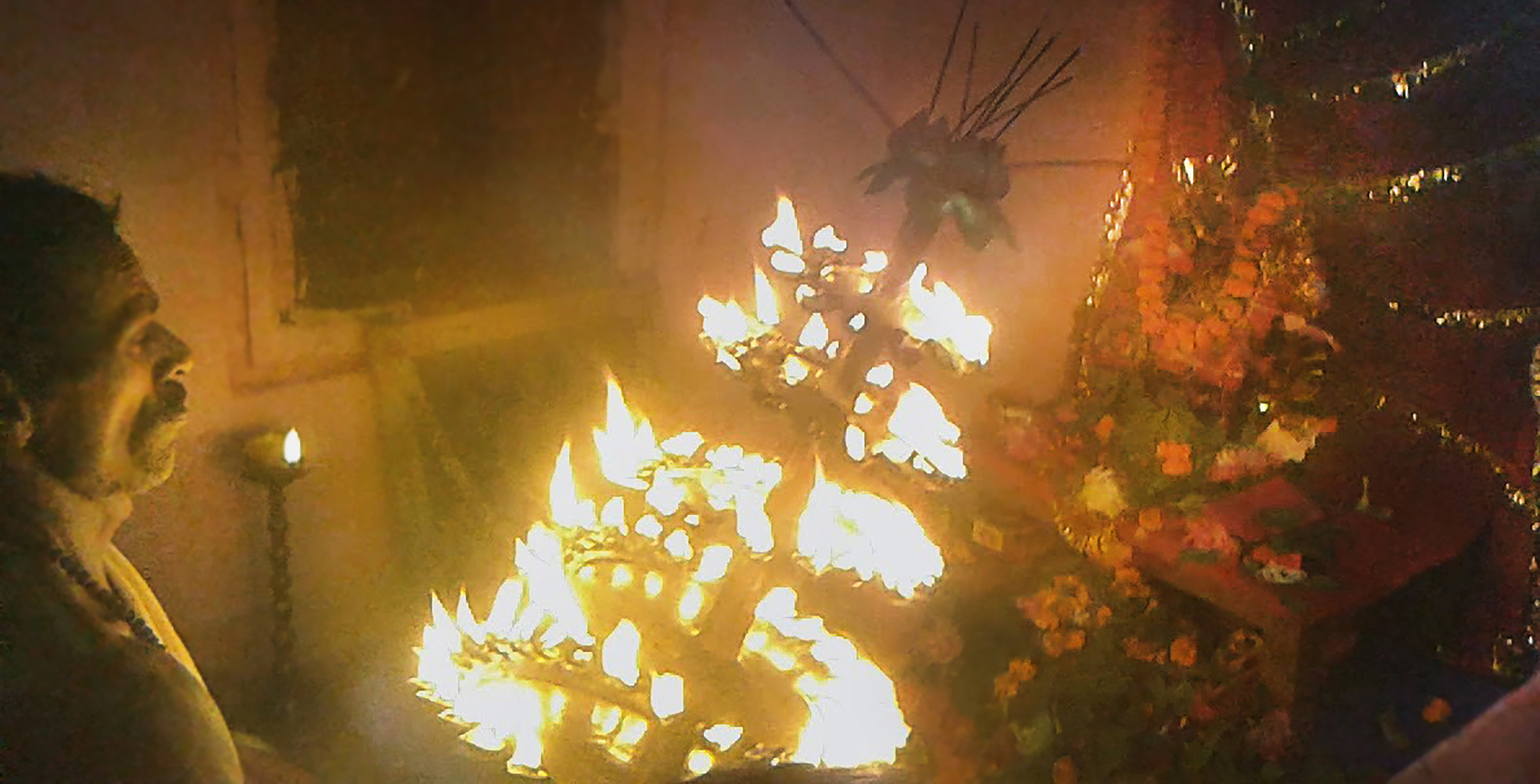
Jagaddhatri Puja at Maliara Mukherjee Family

Jagaddhatri Puja is one of the main festivals of Maliara celebrated by locals traditionally. The Jagaddhatri Puja of Mukherjee family, Parikhapara adjacent to Parimal Mukherjee lane, deserves a special mention in this regard. Folklore has it that this puja was started in 1920 by late Suborna Bala Mukherjee. Hundreds of people of Maliara gathers to celebrate Jagaddhatri Puja with Mukherjee family and the festival last for 3 days. The exact history of the deity is unknown, but family records date it back to 1900.

With respect to its tribal history, people in Maliara fly Kites to celebrate "Mage Porob","Baa Porob","Baraam Puja", the day of a "Ho" tribal god. This is on the last day of the month of Poush, i.e. Poush Sankranti. Apart from kite-flying, a fair is also held on Poush Sankranti. It has a rural flavour and is characterised by the trading of handicraft and household goods. The items of the trade include spades, knives and other iron tools, combs and other goods made of buffalo-horn, baskets (jhuri and dhama) and platters for husking (kula) made of bamboo and cane, etc.

== Transport ==
=== Train ===
Waria railway Station, Durgapur railway station, are the very nearby railway stations from Maliara. However Asansol railway station is a major railway station 39 km near Maliara.

== Education ==
=== Colleges near Maliara ===
- Chhandar J.B.T College
- Barjora College

=== Schools ===
- Maliara Raj Narayan High School is a Bengali-medium coeducational institution established in 1905. It has facilities for teaching from class V to class XII. The school has 10 computers, a library with 1,350 books and a playground.
- Maliara Santosh Girls High School is a Bengali-medium girls only institution established in 1968. It has facilities for teaching from class V to class X. The school has a library with 250 books and a playground.
