= Siromonipur =

- Census village
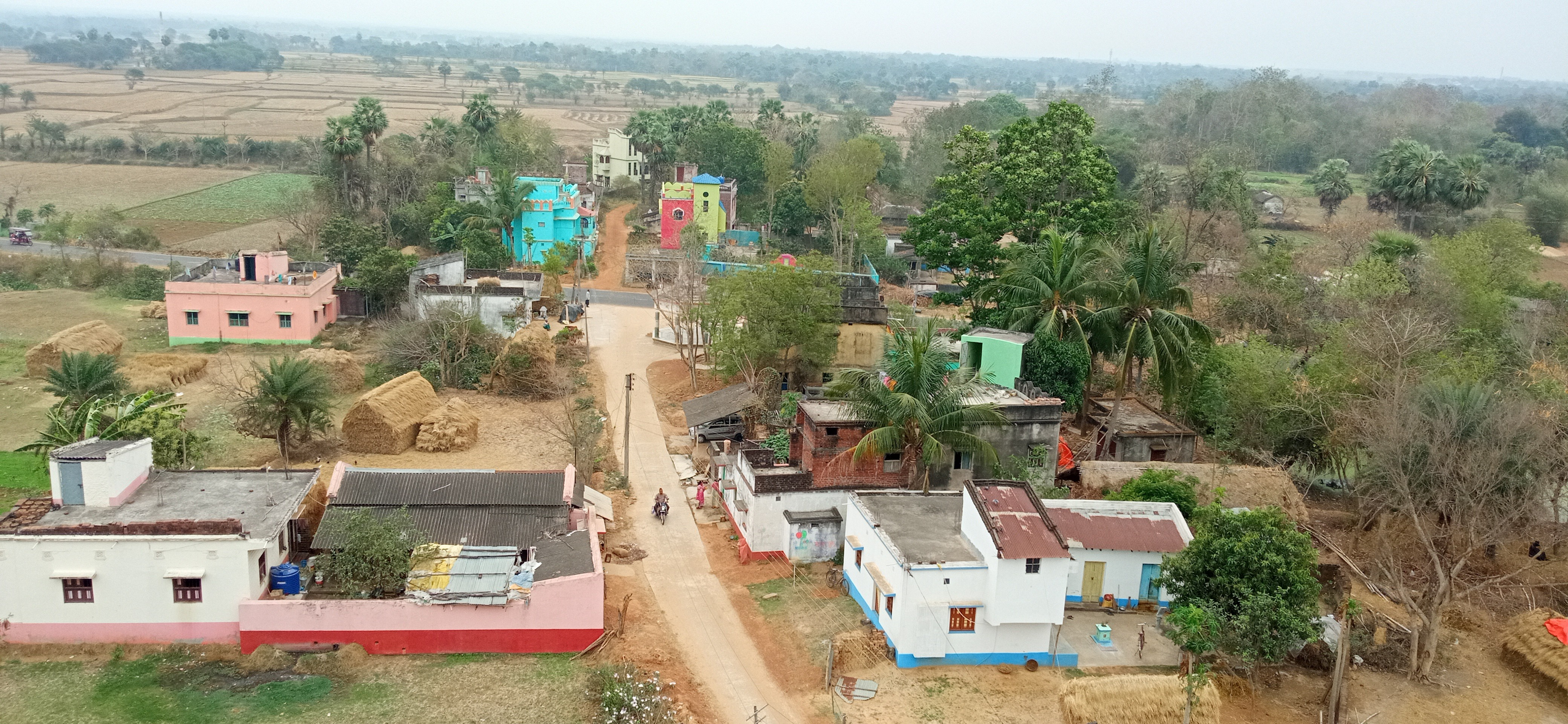
- Areal view of Siromonipur village

- Location in West Bengal, India Siromonipur (India)
- Coordinates: 22.78°N 86.93°E
- Country: India
- State: West Bengal
- District: Bankura

Population (2011)
  - Total: 645

Languages
  - Official: Bengali
- Time zone: UTC+5:30 (IST)
- PIN: 722134 (Siromonipur)
- Telephone/STD code: 03243
- Lok Sabha constituency: Bankura
- Vidhan Sabha constituency: Raipur

Siromonipur is a census village in Raipur CD Block in Bankura district, West Bengal, India.

== Geography ==
Places in Khatra subdivision in Bankura district
CT: census town, R: rural/ urban centre, C: craft centre, T: ancient/ temple centre
Owing to space constraints in the small map, the actual locations in a larger map may vary slightly

=== Location ===
Siromonipur is located at 22.790°N 86.933°E.

=== Area overview ===
The map alongside shows the Khatra subdivision of Bankura district. Physiographically, this area is having uneven lands with hard rocks. In the Khatra CD block area there are some low hills. The Kangsabati project reservoir is prominently visible in the map. The subdued patches of shaded area in the map show forested areas. It is an almost fully rural area.

Note: The map alongside presents some of the notable locations in the subdivision. All places marked in the map are linked in the larger full screen map.

== Education ==
Shiromonipur Primary School was established in 1946. This is a Bengali Medium Primary School.

Raipur Government Polytechnic is a government diploma engineering college in this village. The college was established in 2016
