= Birendra Nath Tudu =

Indian politician

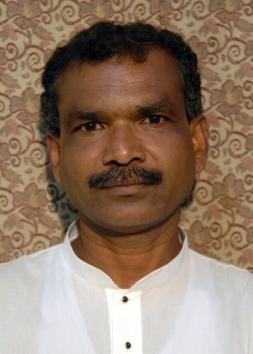
- Birendra Nath Tudu

Member of the West Bengal Legislative Assembly
- In office 2016–2021
- Preceded by: Upen Kisku
- Succeeded by: Mrityunjoy Murmu
- Constituency: Raipur

Personal details
- Party: Trinamool Congress
- Profession: Politician, Ex-servicemen

Birendra Nath Tudu is an Indian politician from West Bengal. He was elected as a Member of the Legislative Assembly in 2016 West Bengal Legislative Assembly election from Raipur, as a member of the Trinamool Congress.
