= Alok Mukherjee (politician) =

Indian politician

Alok Mukherjee (born 1960) is an Indian politician from West Bengal. He is a member of the West Bengal Legislative Assembly from Barjora Assembly constituency in Bankura district. He won the 2021 West Bengal Legislative Assembly election representing the All India Trinamool Congress.

== Early life and education ==
Mukherjee is from Barjora, Bankura district, West Bengal. He is the son of late Asit Mukherjee. He studied Class 10 at Barjora High School and passed the examinations conducted by West Bengal Madhyamik Pariksha Board in 1977.

== Career ==
Mukherjee won from Barjora Assembly constituency representing All India Trinamool Congress in the 2021 West Bengal Legislative Assembly election. He polled 93,290 votes and defeated his nearest rival, Supriti Chatterjee of the Bharatiya Janata Party, by a margin of 3,269 votes.
