= Tungbhum =

Tungbhum was the name given to the tract of country lying to the south of Raipur in present Bankura district in the Indian state of West Bengal.

== History ==
Tung Deo, who came from the banks of Gandaki River on a pilgrimage to Jagannath, was made king of Puri by favour of Jagannath. His grandson Gangadhar Tung was informed by Jagannath that after him there would no king of Puri in his line. Therefore, his son should change his name and go to some other country where he would be king.

Gangadhar Tung’s son, Nukur Tung, left Puri with his wife, his treasure, and some soldiers in 1448 AD and after wandering for a decade settled in Tikarpara, a village near Shyamsundarpur. At that time the area, called Rajagram, comprised Shyamsundarpur, Phulkusma, Raipur, Simlapal, and Bhalaidiha. The area was earlier ruled by Samantasar Raja, who was destroyed with his family in a fire. The area remained without a king and was overrun by robbers. Nukur Tung subdued the robbers and became king on assuming the name of Raja Chhatra Narayan Deb. He called his kingdom Jagannathpur. The Raja brought with him 252 families of Utkal Brahmins, whose descendants are numerous in the region.

The Raja made a grant of Simplapal and Bhalaidaha parganas to Sripati Mahapatra, his spiritual guide and general during the campaign. Raipur pargana was given as grant to a member of the Sikhar Raj family. Subsequently, as a result of a family dispute, the estate was divided into Shyamsundarpur and Phulkusma.

== See also ==
- Matgoda
