= Beliatore =

- Census Town
- Location in West Bengal, India Beliatore (India)
- Coordinates: 23.33°N 87.22°E
- Country: India
- State: West Bengal
- District: Bankura

Area
  - Total: 1.52 km^{2} (0.59 sq mi)
- Elevation: 79 m (259 ft)

Population (2011)
  - Total: 6,463
  - Density: 4,250/km^{2} (11,000/sq mi)

Languages
  - Official: Bengali, English
- Time zone: UTC+5:30 (IST)
- PIN: 722203
- Telephone code: 03241
- Vehicle registration: WB
- Website: bankura.gov.in

Beliatore is a Census Town and a Gram Panchayat in the Barjora CD block in the Bankura Sadar subdivision of the Bankura district in the state of West Bengal, India. Beliatore is the birthplace of artist Jamini Roy.

== History ==
Binoy Ghosh visited Beliatore in 1968, primarily to attend the Gajan and fair of Dharmathakur held on the occasion of Ashadha Purnima. Three deities – Dharmaraj, Swarupnarayan, Madan – were taken on large wooden horses and the ritual of ban-phonra (piercing of tongue, hand or breast with bamboo splinters) was performed by devotees from the lower castes such as Bauris, Khaira, Lohar and others. The village was predominantly populated by the people of lower castes, mainly Bauris, in earlier days. Some well-to-do trading families came and settled there and around two hundred years ago the zamindars, the Roy family, came in. Both belonged to the upper castes. The worship of Dharmathakur, in its present form, was taken up at Beliatore after both the zamindar and trading families had dreams about it. The worship of a popular folk deity of the lower castes was taken up by the upper caste people as per dream wishes and obviously as a part of the process of Brahminisation in the area. With the passage of time, the proportion of upper caste people in the village has gone up and that of the lower castes has come down. Manasa puja and Bhadu festival are celebrated in a big way. In earlier days, Jhapan Utsav, with display of live snakes, was celebrated in Beliatore, but it has been discontinued.

Kachu Roy came and first settled in Jagannathpur and then moved to Beliatore, around 200 years prior to Binoy Ghosh’s visit. Kachu Roy had three sons – Atmaram, Banchharam and Panchanan. The renowned artist Jamini Roy was great grandson of Panchanan Roy. Basanta Ranjan Roy Bidvatballava, whose name is linked with Srikrishnakirtan, was a cousin of Jamini Roy. Both of them made rich contributions to the literature-culture of Bengal. They are related to Pratapaditya.

Jamini Roy’s sister, Sujankumari, was married at the age of 13 but returned as a widow to Beliatore at the age of 21. She developed a primary school, which is still there. Initially she had a small number of upper caste students, but later collected a large number of Bauri students. Her move drew in bitter criticism from village folk. Sujankumari was 80 years old, but still active, when Binoy Ghosh visited Beliatore. When asked what the meaning of the word ‘Bauri’ was, she had explained how the word meant, ‘those who have been kept out of society’.

== Geography ==
Places in Bankura Sadar subdivision in Bankura district
M: municipal town/ city, CT: census town, R: rural/ urban centre, H: hill centre, T: temple/ religious centre, B: barrage
Owing to space constraints in the small map, the actual locations in a larger map may vary slightly

=== Location ===
Beliatore is located at 23.33°N 87.22°E. It has an average elevation of 79 metres (259 feet). It is situated by the River Shali. The town is very well connected to others important place, situated 23 km from Durgapur, 21 km from Bankura town and 23 km from Sonamukhi.

=== Area overview ===
The map alongside shows the Bankura Sadar subdivision of Bankura district. Physiographically, this area is part of the Bankura Uplands in the west gradually merging with the Bankura-Bishnupur Rarh Plains in the north-east. The western portions are characterised by undulating terrain with many hills and ridges. The area is having a gradual descent from the Chota Nagpur Plateau. The soil is laterite red and hard beds are covered with scrub jungle and sal wood. Gradually it gives way to just uneven rolling lands but the soil continues to be lateritic. There are coal mines in the northern part, along the Damodar River. It is a predominantly rural area with 89% of the population living in rural areas and only 11% living in the urban areas.

Note: The map alongside presents some of the notable locations in the subdivision. All places marked in the map are linked in the larger full screen map.

== Demographics ==
According to the 2011 Census of India, Beliatore had a total population of 6,463 of which 3,249 (50%) were males and 3,214 (50%) were females. Population below 6 years was 591. The total number of literates in Beliatore was 5,010 (85.32% of the population over 6 years).

As of 2001 India census, Beliatore had a population of 5,653. Males constitute 51% of the population and females 49%. Beliatore has an average literacy rate of 77.51%, higher than the national average of 59.5%; with 55% of the literates being male and 45% being female. 10% of the population is under 6 years of age.

== Civic administration ==
=== Police station ===
Beliatore police station has jurisdiction over parts of Barjora CD block. The area covered is 222.71 km^{2} and the population covered is 7,563.

== Infrastructure ==
According to the District Census Handbook 2011, Bankura, Beliatore covered an area of 1.52 km^{2}. Among the civic amenities, it had 5 km roads with open drains, the protected water supply involved tap water from un-treated sources, hand pumps. It had 1,000 domestic electric connections. Among the medical facilities it had 2 charitable hospitals/ nursing homes, 14 medicine shops. Among the educational facilities it had were 19 primary schools, 3 middle schools, 2 secondary schools, 2 senior secondary schools, 1 general degree college. It had 1 recognised shorthand, typewriting and vocational training institution, 1 non-formal education centre (Sarva Shiksha Abhiyan), 1 working women’s hostel, 1 old age home. Among the social cultural and recreational facilities, it had 2 auditoriums/ community halls, 2 public libraries. An important commodity it manufactured was sweets. It had the branch offices of 1 nationalised bank, 1 private commercial bank and 1 cooperative bank.

== Transport ==
=== Road ===
Beliatore is well connected to nearby cities and towns through bus services which include both private and government operators. State Highway 8 and State Highway 9 pass through Beliatore. Beliatore is 23 km from Durgapur rail station and 22 km from Bankura town and 23 km from Sonamukhi. Various bus and train service connecting easily Kolkata, Bishnupur, Asansol, Barakar, Malda, Siliguri, Kharagpur, Purulia, Tata, Bhubaneswar and many more places.

=== Railway ===
Beliatore railway station is situated on the Bankura-Masagram line (formerly Bankura Damodar Railway) of South Eastern Railway. DEMU services were available between Bankura and Mashagram 4 times a day the train run on this route.

There used to be the now-defunct Bankura Damodar Railway from Bankura to Rainagar.

== Education ==
There is one higher secondary school for boys (HS for coed), one girls high school, and one undergraduate degree college named Jamini Roy College.

Jamini Roy College was established in 1986. It is affiliated to the Bankura University and offers honours courses in Bengali, English, Sanskrit and history.

Beliatore High School is a Bengali-medium coeducational institution established in 1942. It has facilities for teaching from class V to class XII. The school has 20 computers, a library with 3,265 books and a playground.

Sri Sarada Devi Balika Bidyamandir is a Bengali-medium girls only institution established in 1955. It has facilities for teaching from class V to class XII. The school has 1 computer, a library with 250 books and a playground.

== Culture ==
Beliatore is famous for Mecha Sandesh, a combination of chhatu, chhana, khoya, sugar and ghee. and the art of wooden bead things.

== Notable people ==
Jamini Roy

Khudiram Das

Bimal Ghosh(Moumachi)
