= Pakhanna =

Pakhanna the ancient name of the village was Pushkarna
- Village
- Location in West Bengal, India Pakhanna (India)
- Coordinates: 23.4092660°N 87.3765795°E
- Country: India
- State: West Bengal
- District: Bankura

Government
  - Body: Gram panchayat

Population (2011)
  - Total: 3,588

Languages
  - Official: Bengali, English
- Time zone: UTC+5:30 (IST)
- PIN: 722 208
- ISO 3166 code: IN-WB
- Vehicle registration: WB
- Lok Sabha constituency: Bankura
- Vidhan Sabha constituency: Barjora
- Website: bankura.gov.in

Pakhanna (or Pokharna) is a village in the Barjora police station area of Bankura Sadar subdivision of Bankura district in the Indian state of West Bengal. It is located 40 kilometres (25 mi) north-east of Susunia, on the south bank of Damodar River.

== History ==
This village is considered to be the same as Pushkarana, once the capital of Chandravarman, son of Simhavarman, the extent of whose dominions may have been more or less coterminous with ancient Rarh region or south-west Bengal. It is the place mentioned in the Susunia inscription and dates back to 4th century AD. According to the inscription on the Allahabad pillar Chandravarman was defeated by Samudragupta and the area became a part of the Gupta Empire.

== Geography ==
Places in Bankura Sadar subdivision in Bankura district
M: municipal town/ city, CT: census town, R: rural/ urban centre, H: hill centre, T: temple/ religious centre, B: barrage
Owing to space constraints in the small map, the actual locations in a larger map may vary slightly

=== Location ===
Pakhanna is located at 23°24′33″N 87°22′36″E.

=== Area overview ===
The map alongside shows the Bankura Sadar subdivision of Bankura district. Physiographically, this area is part of the Bankura Uplands in the west gradually merging with the Bankura-Bishnupur Rarh Plains in the north-east. The western portions are characterised by undulating terrain with many hills and ridges. The area is having a gradual descent from the Chota Nagpur Plateau. The soil is laterite red and hard beds are covered with scrub jungle and sal wood. Gradually it gives way to just uneven rolling lands but the soil continues to be lateritic. There are coal mines in the northern part, along the Damodar River. It is a predominantly rural area with 89% of the population living in rural areas and only 11% living in the urban areas.

Note: The map alongside presents some of the notable locations in the subdivision. All places marked in the map are linked in the larger full screen map.

== Demographics ==
According to the 2011 Census of India, Pakhanna had a total population of 3,588, of which 1,825 (51%) were males and 1,763 (49%) were females. There were 382 persons in the age range of 0–6 years. The total number of literate persons in Pakhanna was 2,445 (77.26% of the population over 6 years).

== Education ==
Pakhanna High School is a Bengali-medium coeducational institution established in 2000. It has facilities for teaching from class V to class XII. The school has 10 computers, a library with 2,200 books and a playground.

Pakhanna Girls Junior High School is a Bengali-medium girls only institution established in 2010. It has facilities for teaching from class V to class VIII.

Baro Hajari SCH Madrasah is a Bengali-medium coeducational institution established in 1977. It has facilities for teaching from class V to class XII. The madrasah has 12 computers, a library with 450 books and a playground.

Barjora College was established at Barjora in 1985.

== Healthcare ==
There is a primary health centre at Pakhanna, with 10 beds.
