= Khudiram Das =

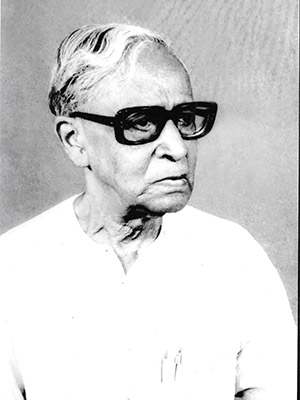
- Born: 9 October 1916; Beliatore, Bankura District, Bengal Presidency, India
- Died: 28 April 2002 (aged 85); Krishnanagar, Nadia, West Bengal, India
- Website: professorkhudiramdas.com

Khudiram Das (9 October 1916 – 28 April 2002) was an Indian scholar, educationist, critic, litterateur, an authority on Rabindra literature and linguistic expert.

== Early life and family ==
Khudiram Das was born in Beliatore situated in Bankura District, West Bengal to Satish Chandra Das and Kaminibala Devi. He studied in Middle English School in Bankura till Sixth standard and passed the Matric Examination in 1933 with Letter marks in Bengali and Sanskrit and I.A. Examination in 1935 from Bankura Zilla School, achieving 1st Division in both examinations. He graduated in Sanskrit with Honours from Bankura Christian College attaining 1st Class Third position in the year 1937. He then moved to Kolkata (then Calcutta) for higher studies. He completed his Master’s (M.A.) in Bengali from University of Calcutta attaining 1st Class 1st position with the then record marks of 72.6%. He was endowed with the Calcutta University Gold Medal and 5 endowment Gold Medals and Sir Ashutosh Mukherjee Silver Medal for standing First in Class in M.A Bengali. He was also awarded with Kavya Tirtha and Kavya Ratna for his excellence in Sanskrit. He passed B.T. examination in 1941.

== Research degree ==
He was awarded the D.Litt. degree of Calcutta University in 1962 which was the first Doctor of Literature awarded in Bengali Literature. Rabindra Pratibhar Parichay, his first book on Tagore's poetical genius, won him this award.

== Career ==
He started his career as a School Inspector in 1941 and continued in that post for a few months. He taught at the Calcutta Women’s College and Scottish Church College from 1941 to 1944, Presidency College from 1945 to 1955, Cooch Behar Raj College in 1955, Krishnagar Government College from 1955 to 1959, Maulana Azad College (then Central Calcutta College) from 1959 to 1973, Hooghly Mohsin College in 1973, and as a Part Time Lecturer at Rabindra Bharati University from 1969 to 1973. He taught at the University of Calcutta as Ramtanu Lahiri Professor of Bengali & Head of the Department of Modern Indian Languages from 1973 to 1981. He retired from government service in the rank of West Bengal Government Senior Education Service.

He was engaged with many organizations and held important positions. He was the President of Bangiya Sanskrita Siksha Parishad, Govt. of West Bengal, Member of Calcutta University Senate Arts Faculty and Ph. D committee, Bangiya Sahitya Parishad, Paschimbanga Bangla Academy, Rabindra Sadan Committee, and Editorial Board of Rabindra Rachanabali Publication Committee (Govt. Of W.B.). After his retirement from active career, he was the Chief Editor of a project of West Bengal State Book Board on a linguistic dictionary of current Bengali words, titled "Bengali Linguistic Dictionary for both Bengalis and Non-Bengalis", from 1982 to 1994.

== Lectures ==
He was invited by the University of Calcutta to deliver the D.L. Roy Lecture and the Vidyasagar Lecture.

== Works ==
Sources:

- Rabindra Pratibhar Parichay (রবীন্দ্র প্রতিভার পরিচয়) (1953)
- Bangla Kavyer Rup o Riti (বাংলা কাব্যের রূপ ও রীতি) (1958)
- Chitra Gitamayi Rabindra Vani (চিত্র গীতময় রবীন্দ্র বানী) (1966)
- Vaishnava Rasa Prokash (বৈষ্ণব রস প্রকাশ) (1972)
- Samaj Pragati Rabindranath (সমাজ প্রগতি রবীন্দ্রনাথ) (1973)
- Rabindra Kalpanay Bigyaner Adhikar (রবীন্দ্র কল্পনায় বিজ্ঞানের অধিকার) (1984)
- Bangla Sahityer Adya Madhya - A History of Bengali Literature (বাংলা সাহিত্যের আদ্য মধ্য) (1985)
- Banan Bananor Bondore (বানান বানানোর বন্দরে) (1993)
- Choddosho Sal O Choloman Rabi (চদ্দোশো সাল ও চলমান রবি) (1993)
- Desh Kal Sahitya (দেশ কাল সাহিত্য) (1995)
- Santhali Bangla Samashabda Abhidhan (সাঁওতালি বাংলা সমশব্দ অভিধান) (1998)
- Bachai Prabandha (বাছাই প্রবন্ধ) (A collection of 14 essays, edited by Manas Majumdar) (2000)
- Pather Chhayachabite Adhyapak Khudiram Das (পথের ছায়াছবিতে অধ্যাপক ক্ষুদিরাম দাস) (edited by Manas Majumdar) (1996)

He edited the Kavikankan Chandi by Mukundaram Chakrabarty in 1976. He also edited Rabindra Prasanga Bodh, a book published by Govt. of West Bengal. He was the Chief Editor of a project of West Bengal State Book Board on a linguistic dictionary of current Bengali words, titled "Bengali Linguistic Dictionary for both Bengalis and Non-Bengalis", from 1982 to 1994. Some of his books are available in ebook format in his website the link to which is http://professorkhudiramdas.com/ebooks-by-professor-khudiram-das .

মনীষয়া দীপ্যতি (Manishoya Dipyoti) was published by Dey's Publishing in 2016 commemorating 100 Years of Birth Anniversary of Dr. Das.

=== Ebooks ===
- Shikkha Bhabna (শিক্ষা ভাবনা)
- Samaj Bhabna (সমাজ ভাবনা)
- Banan Bananor Bondore (বানান বানানোর বন্দরে)
- Amar Rabindranath (আমার রবীন্দ্রনাথ)
- Choloman Khudiram Das (চলমান ক্ষুদিরাম দাস)
- Bangla Sahityer Adyo-Modhyo (বাঙলা সাহিত্যের আদ্য-মধ্য)
- Prosongo Khudiram Das (্প্রসঙ্গ ক্ষুদিরাম দাস)
- Rabindranather Bigyan Boron (রবীন্দ্রনাথের বিজ্ঞান বরণ)
- Pratibadi Kobi Rabindranath (প্রতিবাদী কবি রবীন্দ্রনাথ)

== Honors ==
He was conferred the title of Kavya Tirtha and Kavya Ratna for his expertise in Sanskrit Language and the title of Adya Madhya in Sanskrit Grammar. He was endowed with the Calcutta University Gold Medal and 5 endowment Gold Medals and Sir Ashutosh Silver Medal for standing First in Class in M.A Bengali.

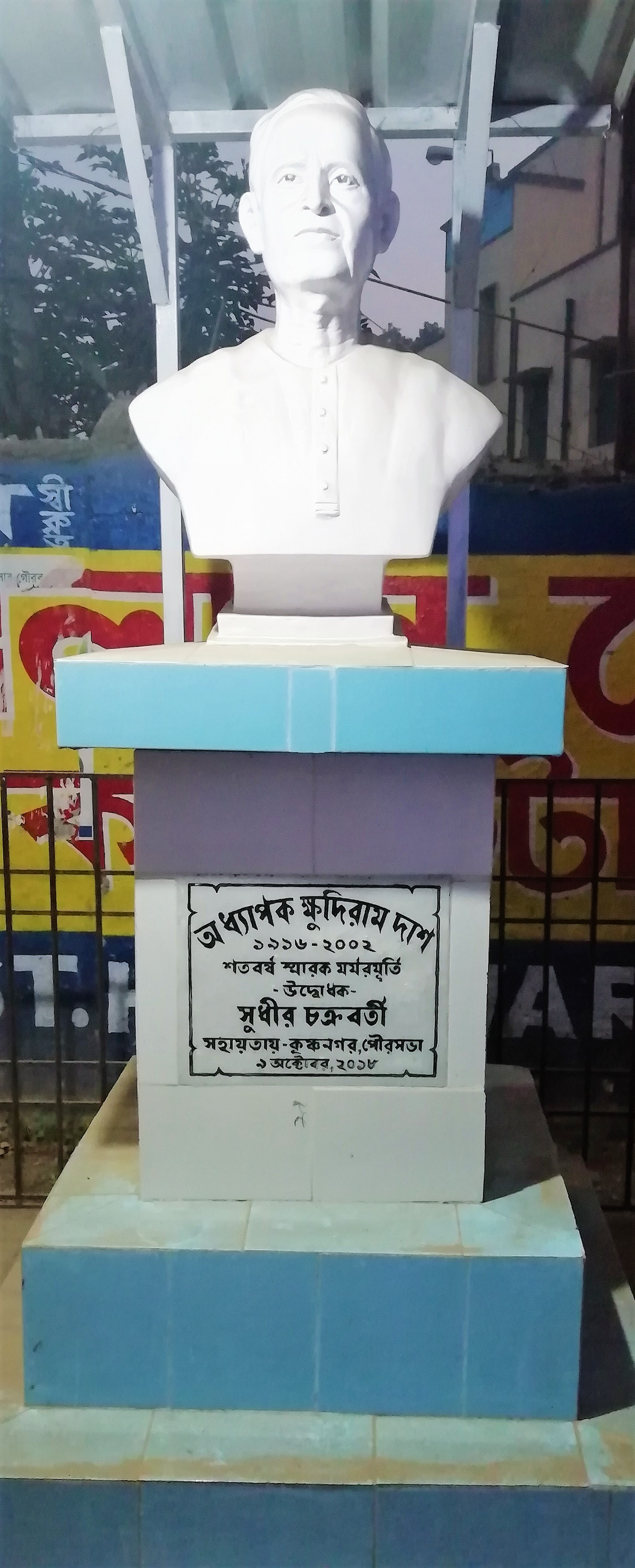
Bust of Dr. Khudiram Das in Krishnagar, West Bengal

He was bestowed with many honors including.

Pranotosh Ghatak Smriti Puraskar (1973)

Vidyasagar Smriti Puraskar (Govt. Of West Bengal) (1984)

Sarojini Basu Gold Medal (University of Calcutta) (1987)

Sahitya Ratna (Howrah Pandit Samaj) (1987)

Rabindra Tattwacharya (Tagore Research Institute) (1992)

Rabindra Smriti Puraskar (Govt. Of West Bengal) (1994)

Narayan Ganguli Smarak Puraskar (1995)

Rabi Tirthankar (Sanskrit College) (1998)

Khudiram Das Memorial Lecture is held every year in Department of Bengali Language and Literature, University of Calcutta in his memory.

A bust of him was erected beside Rabindra Bhawan, Krishnagar on 9 October 2018 in association with Krishnagar Municipality as a part of his birth centenary programme.

== Memorial Prize ==
Kshudiram Das Memorial Prize is awarded for highest proficiency in Bengali Honours in B.A.Examination from Bethune College under University of Calcutta.

== Death ==
He died on 28 April 2002 in Krishnagar, Nadia at the age of 85.
