= Lalbihari Bhattacharya =

Indian politician (died 2019)

MLA of Barjora Vidhan Sabha Constituency
- In office 1982–1987
- Preceded by: Aswini Kumar Raj
- Succeeded by: Jayasri Mitra

Personal details
- Born: 1937/38
- Died: 15 August 2019 (aged 81)
- Party: Communist Party of India (Marxist)

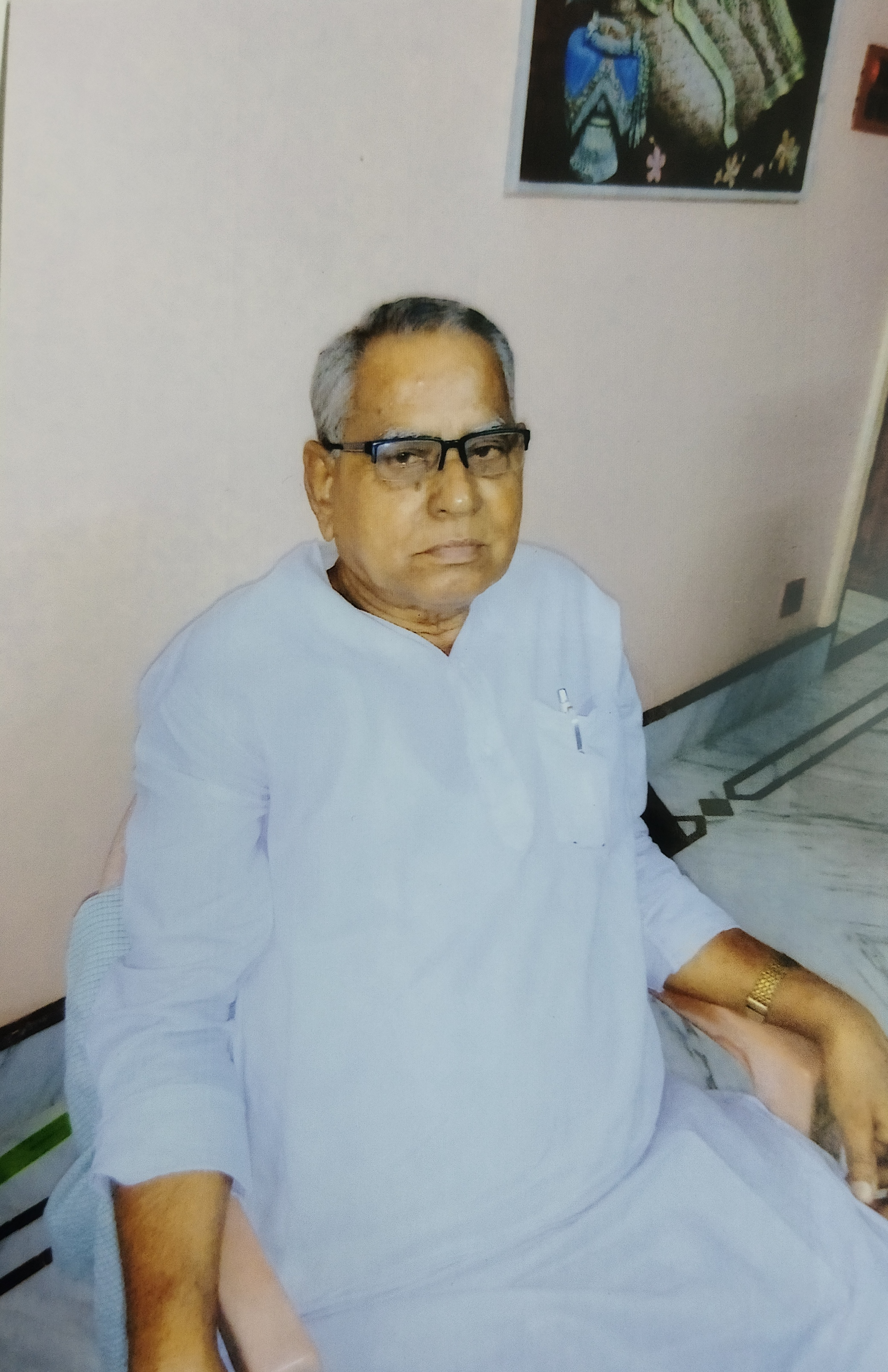

Lalbihari Bhattacharya (1937/38 – 15 August 2019) was an Indian politician. He was elected as MLA of Barjora Vidhan Sabha Constituency in West Bengal Legislative Assembly in 1982. He died on 15 August 2019 at the age of 81.
