= Jagannathpur, Bankura =

Jagannathpur
- Village
- Location in West Bengal, India Jagannathpur (India)
- Coordinates: 23.3468°N 87.3034°E
- Country: India
- State: West Bengal
- District: Bankura

Population (2011)
  - Total: 2,061

Languages
  - Official: Bengali, English
- Time zone: UTC+5:30 (IST)
- PIN: 722203
- Telephone/STD code: 03243
- Lok Sabha constituency: Bishnupur
- Vidhan Sabha constituency: Barjora
- Website: bankura.gov.in

Jagannathpur is a village in the Barjora CD block in the Bankura Sadar subdivision of the Bankura district in the state of West Bengal, India.

== Geography ==
Places in Bankura Sadar subdivision in Bankura district
M: municipal town/ city, CT: census town, R: rural/ urban centre, H: hill centre, T: temple, B: barrage
Owing to space constraints in the small map, the actual locations in a larger map may vary slightly

=== Location ===
Jagannathpur is located at 23.3468°N 87.3034°E.

Note: The map alongside presents some of the notable locations in the subdivision. All places marked in the map are linked in the larger full screen map.

== Demographics ==
According to the 2011 Census of India, Jagannathpur had a total population of 2,061, of which 1,057 (51%) were males and 1,004 (49%) were females. There were 250 persons in the age range of 0–6 years. The total number of literate persons in Jagannathpur was 1,007 (55.60% of the population over 6 years).

== Education ==
Jagannathpur Junior High School is a Bengali-medium coeducational institution established in 2008. It has facilities for teaching from class V to class VIII.

Dadhimukha High School is a Bengali-medium coeducational institution established in 1947. It has facilities for teaching from class V to class XII. The school has 10 computers, a library with 3,300 books and a playground.

== Culture ==
David J. McCutchion mentions that the Ratneswara temple is a large smooth curvilinear rekha, largely plain, built of laterite, stunted.

The Ratneswar Temple is included in the List of Monuments of National Importance in West Bengal by the Archaeological Survey of India (serial no. N-WB-32).

== Healthcare ==
There is a primary health centre at Godardihi, PO Jagannathpur, with four beds.
