= Phulkusma =

- Village
- Location in West Bengal, India Phulkusma (India)
- Coordinates: 22°42′39.6″N 86°51′57.6″E
- Country: India
- State: West Bengal
- District: Bankura
- Elevation: 79 m (259 ft)

Population (2011)
  - Total: 4,003

Languages*
  - Official: Bengali, Santali, English
- Time zone: UTC+5:30 (IST)
- PIN: 722162 (Phulkusma)
- Telephone/STD code: 03243
- Lok Sabha constituency: Bankura
- Vidhan Sabha constituency: Raipur
- Website: bankura.gov.in

Phulkusma (also spelled Fulkusma) is a village and a gram panchayat in the Raipur CD block in the Khatra subdivision of the Bankura district in the state of West Bengal, India.

== History ==
In the 14th century, Phulkusma was a part of Tungbhum.

== Geography ==
Places in Khatra subdivision in Bankura district
CT: census town, R: rural/ urban centre, C: craft centre, T: ancient/ temple centre
Owing to space constraints in the small map, the actual locations in a larger map may vary slightly

=== Location ===
Phulkusma is located at 22°42′39.6″N 86°51′57.6″E.

=== Area overview ===
The map alongside shows the Khatra subdivision of Bankura district. Physiographically, this area is having uneven lands with hard rocks. In the Khatra CD block area there are some low hills. The Kangsabati project reservoir is prominently visible in the map. The subdued patches of shaded area in the map show forested areas. It is an almost fully rural area.

Note: The map alongside presents some of the notable locations in the subdivision. All places marked in the map are linked in the larger full screen map.

== Demographics ==
According to the 2011 Census of India, Phulkusma had a total population of 4,003 of which 1,994 (50%) were males and 2,009 (50%) were females. Population below 6 years was 446. The total number of literates in Phulkusma was 2,744 (77.14% of the population over 6 years).

.*For language details see Raipur, Bankura (community development block)#Language and religion

== Education ==
Fulkusma High School (H.S) is a Bengali-medium coeducational institution established in 1926. It has facilities for teaching from class V to class XII. The school has a library with 13,000 books and a playground. This is one of the fourteen schools in Bankura district in which the opening of an Olchiki medium section (for Santali language) from class V was sanctioned in 2012.

Fulkushma Nityabala Balika Vidalaya (H.S) is a Bengali-medium girls only school established in 1964. It has facilities for teaching from class V to class XII. The school has 14 computers, 1,364 books in the library and a playground. This is one of the fourteen schools in Bankura district in which the opening of an Olchiki medium section (for Santali language) from class V was sanctioned in 2012.

Raipur Block Mahavidyalaya was established in 2010 at Kharigerya. It is affiliated with the Bankura University and offers honours courses in Bengali, Santali and history.

== Healthcare ==
There is a primary health centre at Phulkusma, with 10 beds.
