= Garh Raipur High School (Higher Secondary) =

Garh Raipur High School (H.S.)

Location
- Raipur; West Bengal, 722134; India
- Coordinates: 22.7973°N 86.9511°E

Information
- Established: 1937; 89 years ago
- School board: West Bengal Board of Secondary Education; West Bengal Council of Higher Secondary Education; West Bengal State Council of Technical and Vocational Education and Skill Development
- School code: UDISE Code : 19131609702 Council Code : 114030; Board Code : U1-032 VTC Code : 5043
- President: Debasish Mandal
- Headmaster: Madhusudan Mandal
- Teaching staff: 58
- Grades: V - XII (+2)
- Gender: M (V - X); Both (XI - XII)
- Language: Bangla & English
- Hours in school day: 10.00 AM - 4.00 PM
- Colors: White & Blue
- Slogan: sā vidyā yā vimuktaye
- Sports: Football, Cricket
- Nickname: GRHS

Garh Raipur High School (Higher Secondary) is a high school located in Raipur, Bankura, on the bank of the Kangsabati River.

The school was established in 1937 but didn't start offering higher secondary education until 2009.

== Platinum Jubilee ==
In 2013, Amrita Jayanti program was held to mark the 75th anniversary of the school.

== Classes, divisions and branches ==
Presently this school teaches from 5th to 12th standard.

- 5th class;
- 6th class;
- 7th class;
- 8th class;
- 9th class;
- 9th class;
- 11th - 12th class; Branches: [Humanities; Science; Vocational]

== Sports and co-curricular activities ==
There is a field for student sports, located just in front of the main building. The ground is used for organizing the school's annual sports competitions, inter-class sports competitions.

== Laboratory ==
Students can do research and experiment in computer science, physics, chemistry, biology, and other subjects in the school's labs. These labs contain a wealth of expensive equipment. Students use these resources to acquire real-world knowledge.

== Various cultural activities ==
Various cultural activities are held in the school throughout the year. Martyr's Day, Independence Day, is celebrated jointly by students and teachers with due dignity. Also various educational tours are organized every year.
