= Barjora =

- locality
- Location in West Bengal, India Barjora (India)
- Coordinates: 23.43°N 87.28°E
- Country: India
- State: West Bengal
- District: Bankura

Area
  - Total: 7.25 km^{2} (2.80 sq mi)
- Elevation: 75 m (246 ft)

Population (2011)
  - Total: 14,012
  - Density: 1,930/km^{2} (5,010/sq mi)

Languages
  - Official: Bengali, English
- Time zone: UTC+5:30 (IST)
- Vehicle registration: WB
- Lok Sabha constituency: Bishnupur
- Vidhan Sabha constituency: Barjora
- Website: bankura.gov.in

Barjora is a locality in the Barjora CD block in the Bankura Sadar subdivision of the Bankura district in the state of West Bengal, India.

== Geography ==
Places in Bankura Sadar subdivision in Bankura district
M: municipal town/ city, CT: census town, R: rural/ urban centre, H: hill centre, T: temple/ religious centre, B: barrage
Owing to space constraints in the small map, the actual locations in a larger map may vary slightly

=== Location ===
Barjora is located at 23.43°N 87.28°E. It has an average elevation of 75 metres (246 feet).

=== Area overview ===
The map alongside shows the Bankura Sadar subdivision of Bankura district. Physiographically, this area is part of the Bankura Uplands in the west gradually merging with the Bankura-Bishnupur Rarh Plains in the north-east. The western portions are characterised by undulating terrain with many hills and ridges. The area is having a gradual descent from the Chota Nagpur Plateau. The soil is laterite red and hard beds are covered with scrub jungle and sal wood. Gradually it gives way to just uneven rolling lands but the soil continues to be lateritic. There are coal mines in the northern part, along the Damodar River. It is a predominantly rural area with 89% of the population living in rural areas and only 11% living in the urban areas.

Note: The map alongside presents some of the notable locations in the subdivision. All places marked in the map are linked in the larger full screen map.

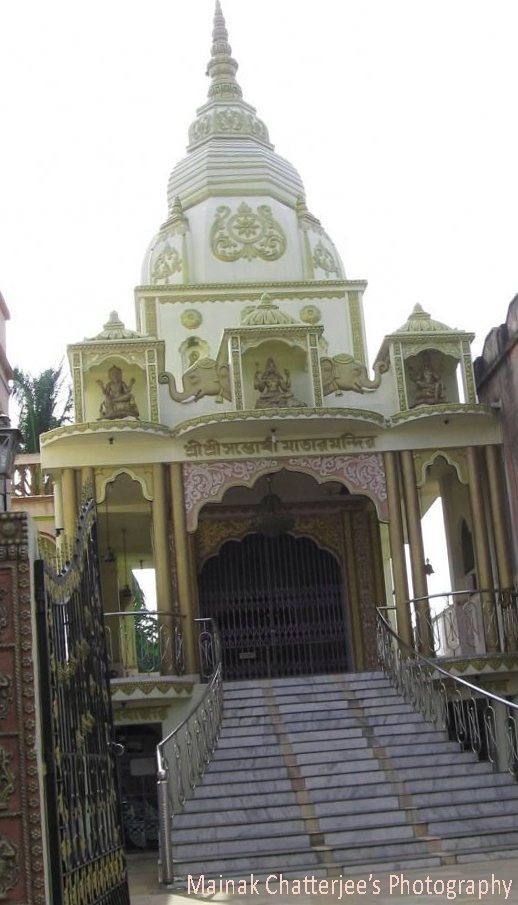
Sri Santoshi Mata Temple in Barjora

== Demographics ==
According to the 2011 Census of India, Barjora had a total population of 14,012 of which 7,203 (51%) were males and 6,809 (49%) were females. Population below 6 years was 1,269. The total number of literates in Barjora was 10,535 (82.67% of the population over 6 years).

As of 2001 India census, Barjora had a population of 11,509. Males constitute 52% of the population and females 48%. Barjora has an average literacy rate of 73%, higher than the national average of 59.5%; 57% of the literates are males and 43% are females. 9% of the population is under 6 years of age.

== Civic administration ==
=== CD block HQ ===
The headquarters of Barjora CD block are located at Barjora.

=== Police station ===
Barjora police station has jurisdiction over parts of Barjora CD block. The area covered is 239.6063 km^{2} and the population covered is 124,692.

== Infrastructure ==
According to the District Census Handbook 2011, Bankura, Barjora covered an area of 7.25 km^{2}. Among the civic amenities, the protected water supply involved tap water from treated sources, covered wells. It had 2,840 domestic electric connections, 406 road lighting points. Among the medical facilities it had 1 hospital, 1 dispensary/ health centre, 1 veterinary hospital. Among the educational facilities it had were 5 primary schools, 2 middle schools, 2 secondary schools, 2 senior secondary schools, 1 general degree college. It had 1 recognised shorthand, typewriting and vocational training institution, 2 non-formal education centres (Sarva Shiksha Abhiyan), 1 special school for disabled. Among the social cultural and recreational facilities, it had 1 auditorium/ community hall, 1 public library, 1 reading room. It had the branch offices of 2 nationalised banks and 1 cooperative bank.

== Economy ==
Barjora is famous for coal. Presently two collieries are being operated at Barjora- 1. Bengal Empta 2. Trans Damodar

== Transport ==
State Highway 9 connects Durgapur with Bankura via Barjora. The Barjora – Maliara- Durlavpur Road originates from 36 km point of the State Highway 9 (Bankura-Durgapur) and terminates on the National Highway 14, which is adjacent to Mejia Thermal Power Station.

== Education ==
Barjora College was established in 1985 with the active support of Aswini Kumar Raj, Lalbehari Bhattacharya, Radhakanta Mondal, Manik Chandra Mukherjee and others. It is affiliated to the Bankura University and offers honours courses in English, Bengali, Sanskrit, history, political science, philosophy, economics and geography.

Barjora High School is a Bengali-medium coeducational institution established in 1962. It has facilities for teaching from class V to class XII. The school has 15 computers and a library with 2,300 books.

Barjora Girls High School is a Bengali-medium girls only institution established in 1973. It has facilities for teaching from class V to class XII. The school has 11 computers and a library with 2,000 books.

== Healthcare ==
Barjora Rural Hospital, with 30 beds, is the major government medical facility in the Barjora CD block. There are primary health centres at Beliatore (with 10 beds), Chhandar (with 4 beds), Godardihi (Jagannathpur) (with 4 beds) and Pakhanna (with 10 beds).

The 300-bedded Sperspcialty Hospital at Barjora was inaugurated in 2015.
