= Kharigerya =

- Village
- Location in West Bengal, India Kharigerya (India)
- Coordinates: 22°45′28.8″N 86°53′02.4″E
- Country: India
- State: West Bengal
- District: Bankura

Population (2011)
  - Total: 1,701

Languages*
  - Official: Bengali, Santali, English
- Time zone: UTC+5:30 (IST)
- Telephone/STD code: 03243
- Lok Sabha constituency: Bankura
- Vidhan Sabha constituency: Raipur
- Website: bankura.gov.in

Kharigerya is a village in the Raipur CD block in the Khatra subdivision of the Bankura district in the state of West Bengal, India

== Geography ==
Places in Khatra subdivision in Bankura district
CT: census town, R: rural/ urban centre, C: craft centre, T: ancient/ temple centre
Owing to space constraints in the small map, the actual locations in a larger map may vary slightly

=== Location ===
Kharigerya is located at 22°45′28.8″N 86°53′02.4″E.

=== Area overview ===
The map alongside shows the Khatra subdivision of Bankura district. Physiographically, this area is having uneven lands with hard rocks. In the Khatra CD block area there are some low hills. The Kangsabati project reservoir is prominently visible in the map. The subdued patches of shaded area in the map show forested areas. It is an almost fully rural area.

Note: The map alongside presents some of the notable locations in the subdivision. All places marked in the map are linked in the larger full screen map.

== Demographics ==
According to the 2011 Census of India, Kharigerya had a total population of 1,701 of which 879 (52%) were males and 822 (48%) were females. Population below 6 years was 159. The total number of literates in Kharigerya was 1,047 (67.90% of the population over 6 years).

.*For language details see Raipur, Bankura (community development block)#Language and religion

== Transport ==
State Highway 9 from Durgapur (in Paschim Bardhaman district) to Nayagram (in Jhargram district) passes near Kharigerya.

== Education ==
Raipur Block Mahavidyalaya was established in 2010. It is affiliated to the Bankura University and offers honours courses in Bengali, Santali and history.

Matgoda High School is a Bengali-medium coeducational institution established in 1957. It has facilities for teaching from class V to class XII. The school has 4 computers, a library with 1,050 books and a playground.
