= Barjora Assembly constituency =

Barjora
- Constituency No. 253 for the West Bengal Legislative Assembly
- Interactive Map Outlining Barjora Assembly Constituency

Constituency details
- Country: India
- Region: East India
- State: West Bengal
- District: Bankura
- Lok Sabha constituency: Bishnupur
- Established: 1951
- Total electors: 203,550
- Reservation: None

Member of Legislative Assembly
- 18th West Bengal Legislative Assembly
- Incumbent Billeswar Sinha
- Party: Bharatiya Janata Party
- Elected year: 2026

Barjora Assembly constituency is an assembly constituency in Bankura district in the Indian state of West Bengal.

== Overview ==
As per orders of the Delimitation Commission, No. 253 Barjora Assembly constituency is composed of the following: Barjora community development block; and Bhaktabandh, Gangajalghati, Gobindadham, Kapista, Nityanandapur and Piraboni gram panchayats of Gangajalghati community development block.

Barjora Assembly constituency is part of No. 37 Bishnupur (Lok Sabha constituency).

== Members of the Legislative Assembly ==
Election	Member	Party affiliation
2026	Billeswar Sinha	Bharatiya Janata Party
2021	Alok Mukherjee	All India Trinamool Congress
2016	Sujit Chakraborty	Communist Party of India (Marxist)
2011	Asutosh Mukherjee	All India Trinamool Congress
2006	Susmita Biswas	Communist Party of India (Marxist)
2001	Susmita Biswas	Communist Party of India (Marxist)
1996	Susmita Biswas	Communist Party of India (Marxist)
1991	Jayasri Mitra	Communist Party of India (Marxist)
1987	Jayasri Mitra	Communist Party of India (Marxist)
1982	Lalbihari Bhattacharya	Communist Party of India (Marxist)
1977	Aswini Kumar Raj	Communist Party of India (Marxist)
1972	Sudhansu Sekhar Tewary	Indian National Congress
1971	Aswini Kumar Raj	Communist Party of India (Marxist)
1969	Aswini Kumar Raj	Communist Party of India (Marxist)
1967	A.Chatterje	Indian National Congress
1962	Pramatha Ghosh	Communist Party of India (Marxist)
1957	No Seat	
1952	Prafulla Chandra Roy	Indian National Congress

== Election results ==
=== 2026 ===
2026 West Bengal Legislative Assembly election: Barjora
Party	Candidate	Votes	%	±%
BJP	Billeswar Sinha	125,419	53.29	+12.27
AITC	Goutam Mishra	84,109	35.74	−6.77
CPI(M)	Sujit Chakraborty	14,868	6.32	−5.18
INC	Keora Vivekananda	2,199	0.93	
Independent	Saileswar Pal	2,159	0.92	
NOTA	None of the above	2,686	1.14	−1.09
Majority		41,310	17.55	+16.06
Turnout		235,362	93.32	+5.79
BJP gain from AITC		Swing		

=== 2021 ===
2021 West Bengal Legislative Assembly election: Barjora
Party	Candidate	Votes	%	±%
AITC	Alok Mukherjee	93,290	42.51	
BJP	Supriti Chatterjee	90,021	41.02	
CPI(M)	Sujit Chakraborty	25,235	11.5	
Independent	Tarani Roy	2,081	0.95	
NOTA	None of the above	4,903	2.23	
Majority		3,269	1.49	
Turnout		219,452	87.53	
AITC gain from CPI(M)		Swing		

=== 2016 ===
2016 West Bengal Legislative Assembly election: Barjora
Party	Candidate	Votes	%	±%
CPI(M)	Sujit Chakraborty	86,873	43.42	+0.53
AITC	Soham Chakraborty	86,257	43.11	−4.58
BJP	Sujit Agasthi	15,991	7.99	+4.46
SUCI(C)	Sudarshan Adhikari	2,352	1.18	N/A
Independent	Raghunath Roy	2,326	1.16	N/A
BMP	Indrani Sardar	2,050	1.02	N/A
NOTA	None of the above	4,235	2.12	N/A
Majority		616	0.31	−4.49
Turnout		2,00,084	86.46	−0.55
Registered electors		2,31,414		
CPI(M) gain from AITC		Swing		

=== 2011 ===
West Bengal assembly elections, 2011: Barjora
Party	Candidate	Votes	%	±%
AITC	Asutosh Mukherjee	84,457	47.69	+9.18
CPI(M)	Susmita Biswas	75,966	42.89	−10.28
BJP	Sanjoy Pal	6,245	3.53	
Independent	Prasanta Hembram	5,577		
Independent	Thakurdas Hembram	2,592		
BSP	Bhabesh Tudu	2,265		
Turnout		177,102	87.01	
AITC gain from CPI(M)		Swing	19.46	

=== 2006 ===
In the 2006, 2001 and 1996 state assembly elections, Susmita Biswas of CPI(M) won the Barjora seat defeating Shampa Daripa of Trinamool Congress, Sudhansu Sekhar Tewari of Trinamool Congress and Tapasi Banerjee of Congress respectively. Contests in most years were multi cornered but only winners and runners are being mentioned. Jayasri Mitra of CPI(M) defeated Sabyasachi Roy of Congress in 1991 and Sudhansu Sekhar Tewari of Congress in 1987. Lalbihari Bhattacharya of CPI(M) defeated Sudhansu Sekhar Tewari of Congress in 1982. Aswini Kumar Raj of CPI(M) defeated Sudhansu Sekhar Tewari of Congress in 1977.

=== 1972 ===
Sudhansu Sekhar Tewary of Congress won in 1972. Aswini Kumar Raj of CPI(M) won in 1971 and 1969. A.Chatterjee of Congress won in 1967. Pramatha Ghosh of CPI won in 1962. The Barjora seat was not there in 1957. Prafulla Chandra Roy of Congress won the Barjora seat in independent India's first election in 1952.
