= Barjora College =

- Type: Undergraduate college Public college
- Established: 1985; 41 years ago
- Affiliations: Bankura University
- Principal: Arun Kumar Roy
- Location: Barjora, West Bengal, 722202, India; 23.4296529°N 87.2723724°E
- Campus: Urban
- Website: barjoracollege.co.in
- Location in West Bengal Barjora College (India)

Barjora College, established in 1985, is the general degree college in Barjora, Bankura district, West Bengal, India. It offers undergraduate courses in arts. It is affiliated to Bankura University.

== History ==
Barjora College was established in 1985 to provide higher education in northern Bankura district. Many distinguished personalities of this area and the common people donated the land for this college. This college was initially started in Barjora High School; later it was shifted to its permanent building in 1987.

== Departments ==
=== Arts ===
- Bengali(Hons)
- English(Hons)
- History (Hons)
- Political Science (Hons)
- Philosophy (Hons)
- Sanskrit (Hons)
- Geography (Hons)
- Economics
- Education
- Sociology

== Accreditation ==
In 2016 the college has been awarded B grade by the National Assessment and Accreditation Council (NAAC). The college is recognized by the University Grants Commission (UGC).

== See also ==
- List of institutions of higher education in West Bengal
- Education in India
- Education in West Bengal
