= Raipur, West Bengal Assembly constituency =

Raipur
- Constituency No. 250 for the West Bengal Legislative Assembly
- Interactive Map Outlining Raipur Assembly Constituency

Constituency details
- Country: India
- Region: East India
- State: West Bengal
- District: Bankura
- Lok Sabha constituency: Bankura
- Established: 1951
- Total electors: 178,267
- Reservation: ST

Member of Legislative Assembly
- 18th West Bengal Legislative Assembly
- Incumbent Kshetra Mohan Hansda
- Party: Bharatiya Janata Party
- Elected year: 2026

Raipur is an assembly constituency in Bankura district in the Indian state of West Bengal. It is reserved for scheduled tribes.

== Overview ==
As per orders of the Delimitation Commission, No. 250 Raipur Assembly constituency (ST) is composed of the following: Raipur and Sarenga community development blocks.

Raipur Assembly constituency is part of No. 36 Bankura (Lok Sabha constituency).

== Members of the Legislative Assembly ==
Year	Name	Party
1952	Jadu Nath Murmu	Independent politician
1952	Jatindra Nath Basu	Indian National Congress
1957	Jadu Nath Murmu	Indian National Congress
1957	Sudha Rani Dutta	Indian National Congress
1962	Sudha Rani Dutta	Indian National Congress
1967	Bhabatosh Saren	Bangla Congress
1969	Bhabatosh Saren	Bangla Congress
1971	Babulal Saren	Jharkhand Party
1972	Maniklal Besra	Communist Party of India
1977	Apindra Kisku	Communist Party of India (Marxist)
1982	Upen Kisku	Communist Party of India (Marxist)
1987	Upen Kisku	Communist Party of India (Marxist)
1991	Upen Kisku	Communist Party of India (Marxist)
1996	Upen Kisku	Communist Party of India (Marxist)
2001	Upen Kisku	Communist Party of India (Marxist)
2006	Upen Kisku	Communist Party of India (Marxist)
2011	Upen Kisku	Communist Party of India (Marxist)
2016	Birendra Nath Tudu	All India Trinamool Congress
2021	Mrityunjoy Murmu	All India Trinamool Congress
2026	Kshetra Mohan Hansda	Bharatiya Janata Party

== Election results ==
=== 2026 ===
2026 West Bengal Legislative Assembly election: Raipur
Party	Candidate	Votes	%	±%
BJP	Kshetra Mohan Hansda	111,443	53.01	+11.03
AITC	Thakur Mani Saren	82,701	39.34	−12.62
CPI(M)	RamChandra Mandi	8,316	3.96	
NOTA	None of the above	1,829	0.87	−0.67
Majority		28,742	13.67	+3.69
Turnout		210,215	93.59	+7.0
BJP gain from AITC		Swing		

=== 2021 ===
2021 West Bengal Legislative Assembly election: Raipur
Party	Candidate	Votes	%	±%
AITC	Mrityunjoy Murmu	101,043	51.96	
BJP	Shudhansu Hansda	81,645	41.98	+33.9
ISF	Milan Mandi	6,593	3.39	
NOTA	None of the above	2,986	1.54	
Majority		19,398	9.98	
Turnout		194,476	86.59	
AITC hold		Swing		

=== 2016 ===
West Bengal assembly elections, 2016: Raipur (ST) constituency
Party	Candidate	Votes	%	±%
AITC	Birendra Nath Tudu	89,841	50.67	+6.41
CPI(M)	Dilip Kumar Hansda	63,119	35.60	−8.78
BJP	Shudhansu Hansda	14,332	8.08	
NOTA	None of the above	3,215	1.81	
JMM	Chunaram Saren	2,769	1.56	
Independent	Dulal Saren	1,740	0.98	
CPI(ML)L	Kandan Mandi	1,552	0.88	
BMP	Kalipada Hembram	754	0.43	
Turnout		177,322	86.70	−0.62
AITC gain from CPI(M)		Swing		

=== 2011 ===
West Bengal assembly elections, 2011: Raipur
Party	Candidate	Votes	%	±%
CPI(M)	Upen Kisku	69,008	44.38	−10.34
AITC	Pramila Murmu	68,826	44.26	+9.11
JMM	Kshetra Mohan Hansda	7,776		
BJP	Pelaram Murmu	3,770		
Independent	Sukchand Saren	3,501		
Independent	Jnanada Mandi	1,501		
Independent	Dhirendranath Mandi	1,050		
JVM(P)	Parisritosh Saren	658		
Turnout		155,490	87.22	
CPI(M) hold		Swing	-19.45	

=== 2006 ===
In the 2006, 2001, 1996, 1991, 1987 and 1982 state assembly elections, Upen Kisku of CPI(M) won the Raipur assembly seat defeating his nearest rivals Bibhabati Tudu of Trinamool Congress, Kshetra Mohan Hansda, Independent, Smritirekha Kisku of Congress, Aditya Kisku, Independent, and Bhabaosh Saren of Congress (two consecutive elections), respectively. Contests in most years were multi cornered but only winners and runners are being mentioned. Apindra Kisku of CPI(M) defeated Gangadhar Murmu of Congress in 1977.

=== 1972 ===
Maniklal Besra of CPI won in 1972. Babulal Saren of Jharkhand Party won in 1971. Bhabatosh Saren of Bangla Congress won in 1969 and 1967. Sudha Rani Dutta of Congress won in 1962. In 1957 and 1952 Raipur had dual/ joint seats. Jadu Nath Murmu and Sudha Rani Dutta, both of Congress, won in 1957. Jadu Nath Murmu, Independent, and Jatindra Nath Basu of Congress, won in independent India's first election in 1952.
