= Ranibandh =

- Village
- Location in West Bengal, India Ranibandh (India)
- Coordinates: 22°51′53.7″N 86°47′04.6″E
- Country: India
- State: West Bengal
- District: Bankura

Population (2011)
  - Total: 2,366

Languages*
  - Official: Bengali, Santali, English
- Time zone: UTC+5:30 (IST)
- PIN: 722148 (Ranibandh)
- Telephone/STD code: 03243
- Lok Sabha constituency: Bankura
- Vidhan Sabha constituency: Ranibandh
- Website: bankura.gov.in

Ranibandh is a village in the Ranibandh CD block in the Khatra subdivision of the Bankura district in the Indian state of West Bengal.

== The Early Medieval History ==
Maniklal Sinha, in his book, Paschim Rahr Tatha Bankura Sanskriti mention that like other places of Rarh, Ranibandh is also a nodal point of Jainism. Chittaranjan Dasgupta also noted that surrounding region involved in trade of metal—primarily iron and copper and served as a hinterland to the port of Tamralipta.

== Geography ==
Places in Khatra subdivision in Bankura district
CT: census town, R: rural/ urban centre, C: craft centre, T: ancient/ temple centre
Owing to space constraints in the small map, the actual locations in a larger map may vary slightly

=== Location ===
Ranibandh is located at 22°51′53.7″N 86°47′04.6″E.

=== Area overview ===
The map alongside shows the Khatra subdivision of Bankura district. Physiographically, this area is having uneven lands with hard rocks. In the Khatra CD block area there are some low hills. The Kangsabati project reservoir is prominently visible in the map. The subdued patches of shaded area in the map show forested areas. It is an almost fully rural area.

Note: The map alongside presents some of the notable locations in the subdivision. All places marked in the map are linked in the larger full screen map.

== Demographics ==
According to the 2011 Census of India, Ranibandh had a total population of 2,366 of which 1,201 (51%) were males and 1,165 (49%) were females. Population below 6 years was 258. The total number of literates in Ranibandh was 1,699 (80.60% of the population over 6 years).

.*For language details see Ranibandh (community development block)#Language and religion

== Civic administration ==
=== Police station ===
Ranibandh police station has jurisdiction over a part of the Ranibandh CD block. The area covered is 63,177.02 acres with a population of 73,188.

=== CD block HQ ===
The headquarters of Ranibadh CD block are located at Ranibandh.

== Education ==
Ranibandh High School is a Bengali-medium coeducational institution established in 1940. It has facilities for teaching from class V to class XII. The school has 14 computers, a library with 1,200 books and a playground. It is one of the fourteen schools in Bankura district in which the opening of an Olchiki medium section (for Santali language) from class V was sanctioned in 2012.

Ranibandh Girls High School is a Bengali-medium girls only institution established in 1966. It has facilities for teaching from class V to class XII. The school has 14 computers, a library with 2,000 books and a playground. It This is one of the fourteen schools in Bankura district in which the opening of an Olchiki medium section (for Santali language) from class V was sanctioned in 2012.

Dhadkidighi Junior High School is a Bengali-medium coeducational institution established in 2011. It has facilities for teaching from class V to class VIII. The school has a playground.

Mukundapur Junior High School is a Bengali-medium coeducational institution established in 2011. It has facilities for teaching from class V to class VIII.

Birsha Munda Memorial College was established at Pirrah, PO Haludkanali, in 2010. Affiliated with the Bankura University, it offers honours courses in Bengali, Santali, history and a general course in arts.

== Healthcare ==
Ranibandh Rural Hospital, with 30 beds at Ranibandh, is the major government medical facility in the Ranibandh CD block. There are primary health centres at Jhilimili (with 10 beds), Barikul (with 2 beds), Haludkanali (with 6 beds) and Khejuria (with 6 beds).

== Transport ==
Ranibandh is on the Khatra-Jhilimili Road.
