= Rautara =

- Village
- Location in West Bengal, India Rautara (India)
- Coordinates: 22°49′36.1″N 86°39′42.1″E
- Country: India
- State: West Bengal
- District: Bankura

Population (2011)
  - Total: 1,384

Languages*
  - Official: Bengali, Santali, English
- Time zone: UTC+5:30 (IST)
- PIN: 722135 (Rautara)
- Telephone/STD code: 03243
- Lok Sabha constituency: Bankura
- Vidhan Sabha constituency: Ranibandh
- Website: bankura.gov.in

Rautara is a village in the Ranibandh CD block in the Khatra subdivision of the Bankura district in the state of West Bengal, India

== Geography ==
Places in Khatra subdivision in Bankura district
CT: census town, R: rural/ urban centre, C: craft centre, T: ancient/ temple centre
Owing to space constraints in the small map, the actual locations in a larger map may vary slightly

=== Location ===
Rautara is located at 22°49′36.1″N 86°39′42.1″E.

=== Area overview ===
The map alongside shows the Khatra subdivision of Bankura district. Physiographically, this area is having uneven lands with hard rocks. In the Khatra CD block area there are some low hills. The Kangsabati project reservoir is prominently visible in the map. The subdued patches of shaded area in the map show forested areas. It is an almost fully rural area.

Note: The map alongside presents some of the notable locations in the subdivision. All places marked in the map are linked in the larger full screen map.

== Demographics ==
According to the 2011 Census of India, Rautara had a total population of 1,384 of which 701 (51%) were males and 683 (49%) were females. Population below 6 years was 143. The total number of literates in Rautara was 860 (69.30% of the population over 6 years).

.*For language details see Ranibandh (community development block)#Language and religion

== Transport ==
A road from Rautara connects to the road running from Mukutmanipur to Jhilimili. It is 4 km from Jhilimili.

== Education ==
Government General Degree College, Ranibandh has been started in 2015 at Rautara. It is offering honours courses in physics, history, education, Bengali, Santhali, Sanskrit and English.

Pandit Raghunath Murmu Centenary High School is a Bengali-medium coeducational institution established in 2005. It has facilities for teaching from class V to class X. The school has a library with 376 books and a playground.

Bhurrudanga Junior High School is a Bengali-medium coeducational institution established in 2010. It has facilities for teaching from class V to class VIII. The school has a playground.

Khatam Junior High School is a Bengali-medium coeducational institution established in 2009. It has facilities for teaching from class V to class VIII. The school has a library with 250 books and a playground.

Muchikata Junior High School is a Bengali-medium coeducational institution established in 2009. It has facilities for teaching from class V to class VIII. The school has a playground.

There is a higher secondary school at Jhilimili.
