= Department of Minority Affairs & Madrasah Education (West Bengal) =

Indian state government ministry

Ministry of Minority Affairs & Madrasah Education
Department overview
- Jurisdiction: Government of West Bengal
- Headquarters: Writers' Building, Kolkata
- Minister responsible: Kshudiram Tudu, Minister in Charge

The Department of Minority Affairs & Madrasah Education of West Bengal is a West Bengal government ministry. It is a ministry responsible for catering the aspirations of the Minorities of the State, specially in the field of Development and Welfare. Minority Affairs and Madrasah Education Department renamed from Minority Development and Welfare Department vide Home (C&E) Department Notification No. 42-Home (Cons.)/R2R(Cons.)-4/2007, dated 18.02.2008. Originated from the Minority Cell of Political Branch of Home Department, the Minority Development & Welfare Dept. started functioning as a full-fledged Department by amending the Rules of Business vide Home(C&E) Department Notification No. 705-Home (Cons.), dated 30.05.1996.

== Ministerial Team ==
The ministerial team is headed by the Cabinet Minister for Minority Affairs & Madrassah Education, who may or may not be supported by Ministers of State. Civil servants are assigned to them to manage the ministers' office and ministry.

The current head of the ministry is Kshudiram Tudu since 11th May 2026
