= Deblina Hembram =

Indian politician

Deblina Hembram দেবলীনা হেমব্রম

Minister of Tribal Affairs, Government of West Bengal
- In office 2006–2011

Member of the West Bengal Legislative Assembly
- In office 1996–2001
- Constituency: Ranibandh
- In office 2006–2016
- Preceded by: Makar Tudu
- Succeeded by: Jyotsna Mandi
- Constituency: Ranibandh

Personal details
- Party: Communist Party of India (Marxist)

Deblina Hembram is an Indian Politician from West Bengal and a central committee member of Communist Party of India (Marxist). She was the Minister for Tribal Affairs in the 2006-11 Left Front Ministry.

== Personal life and education ==
Deblina Hembram is married to Suklal Hembram. She completed her 10th standard in 1988 from Baddi High School, affiliated with West Bengal Board of Secondary Education.

== Political career ==
Deblina Hembram is a three time MLA from Ranibandh Assembly Constituency. This is a reserved constituency for Scheduled Tribes. She has won from here in 1996, 2006 and 2011 West Bengal Assembly elections. She had to face Anil Hansda of Congress Party in her debut election in Ranibandh and marked a huge victory with a margin of 32,409 votes. In 2006 election she defeated Aditya Kisku of JKP(N) by 10,890 votes. In 2011 assembly elections she defeated Falguni Hembram of All India Trinamool Congress by 6,859 votes.

=== Assembly Elections ===
1996 West Bengal Assembly Election RANIBANDH (ST)
Candidate name	Political Party	Votes Polled	Percentage of Votes	Margin of Victory
Deblina Hembram	CPI(M)	58,474	55.86%	32,409 Votes
Anil Hansda	Indian National Congress	26,065	24.90%	
Jagannath Tudu	JKP(N)	7,607	7.27%	
Tudu Milan	JMM	7,263	6.94%	
Basen Hansda	BJP	5,098	4.87%	
Raghunath Tudu	Independent	174	0.17%	

2006 West Bengal Assembly Election RANIBANDH (ST)
Candidate name	Political Party	Votes Polled	Percentage of Votes	Margin of Victory
Deblina Hembram	CPI(M)	52,827	45.34%	10,890 Votes
Aditya Kisku	JKP(N)	41,937	35.88%	
Mayana Saren	Indian National Congress	13,291	11.39%	
Ramakrishna Mudi	Independent	3,608	3.09%	
Jaleswar Saren	BSP	3,019	2.59%	
Biswanath Mandi	JDP	1,806	1.55%	

2011 West Bengal Assembly Election RANIBANDH (ST)
Candidate name	Political Party	Votes Polled	Percentage of Votes	Margin of Victory
Deblina Hembram	CPI(M)	75,388	44.25%	6,859 Votes
Falguni Hembram	All India Trinamool Congress	68,529	40.22%	
Aditya Kisku	JHAP	10,950	6.43%	
Lakshmi Kanta Sardar	BJP	6,447	3.78%	
Biswanath Tudu	Independent	5,407	3.17%	
Sudhir Kumar Murmu	CPI(ML)(L)	2,580	1.51%	
Krishnapada Mandi	JVM	1,071	0.63%	

- On 11 December 2012, Deblina Hembram was assaulted by Trinamool Congress legislators inside West Bengal state assembly for speaking up against the chit fund racket scam of ruling party. She was pinned down to the floor and then beaten up by male Trinamool Congress legislators and was immediately hospitalised.
- Deblina Hembram's speech (in her Mother tongue Santhali) against Trinamool Congress at Brigade Parade Ground, Kolkata in February 2019 became an internet sensation.
- She was the candidate of CPI(M) from Jhargram Lok Sabha constituency in 2019 parliament election. She lost the election to Kunar Hembram of Bharatiya Janata Party.

=== Organisational Leadership ===
- In 33rd conference of All India Kisan Sabha she was elected to the All India Kisan Council.
- National Vice President of All India Democratic Women's Association.
