= Ranibandh (community development block) =

- Community development block
- Coordinates: 22.8639200°N 86.7846070°E
- Country: India
- State: West Bengal
- District: Bankura

Government
  - Type: Representative democracy

Area
  - Total: 428.40 km^{2} (165.41 sq mi)
- Elevation: 83 m (272 ft)

Population (2011)
  - Total: 119,089
  - Density: 277.99/km^{2} (719.98/sq mi)

Languages
  - Official: Bengali, Santali, English
- Time zone: UTC+5:30 (IST)
- PIN: 722148 (Ranibandh)
- Telephone/STD code: 03243
- ISO 3166 code: IN-WB
- Vehicle registration: WB-67, WB-68
- Literacy: 68.53%
- Lok Sabha constituency: Bankura
- Vidhan Sabha constituency: Ranibandh
- Website: bankura.gov.in

Ranibandh is a community development block (CD block) that forms an administrative division in Khatra subdivision of Bankura district in the Indian state of West Bengal.

== History ==
=== From Bishnupur kingdom to the British Raj ===
From around the 7th century AD till around the advent of British rule, for around a millennium, history of Bankura district is identical with the rise and fall of the Malla Rajas of Bishnupur. The Bishnupur Rajas, who were at the summit of their fortunes towards the end of the 17th century, started declining in the first half of the 18th century. First, the Maharaja of Burdwan seized the Fatehpur Mahal, and then the Maratha invasions laid waste their country.

Bishnupur was ceded to the British with the rest of Burdwan chakla in 1760. In 1787, Bishnupur was united with Birbhum to form a separate administrative unit. In 1793 it was transferred to the Burdwan collectorate. In 1879, the district acquired its present shape with the thanas of Khatra and Raipur and the outpost of Simplapal being transferred from Manbhum, and the thanas of Sonamukhi, Kotulpur and Indas being retransferred from Burdwan. However, it was known for sometime as West Burdwan and in 1881 came to be known as Bankura district.

=== Red corridor ===
106 districts spanning 10 states across India, described as being part of the Left wing extremism activities, constitutes the Red corridor. In West Bengal the districts of Paschim Medinipur, Bankura, Purulia and Birbhum are part of the Red corridor. However, as of July 2016, there had been no reported incidents of Maoist related activities from these districts for the previous 4 years.

The CPI (Maoist) extremism which started in the district in the mid-nineties was mainly concentrated in five police station areas of Khatra subdivision – Sarenga, Barikul, Ranibandh, Raipur and Simlapal. They also functioned across the adjoining areas of Paschim Medinipur and Purulia districts.

The Lalgarh movement, which started attracting attention after the failed assassination attempt on Buddhadeb Bhattacharjee, then chief minister of West Bengal, in the Salboni area of Paschim Medinipur district, on 2 November 2008 and the police action that followed, had also spread over to these areas. The movement was not just a political struggle but an armed struggle that concurrently took the look of a social struggle. A large number of CPI (M) activists were killed. Although the epi-centre of the movement was Lalgarh, it was spread across 19 police stations in three adjoining districts – Paschim Medinipur, Bankura and Purulia, all thickly forested and near the border with Jharkhand. The deployment of CRPF and other forces started on 11 June 2009. The movement came to an end after the 2011 state assembly elections and change of government in West Bengal. The death of Kishenji, the Maoist commander, on 24 November 2011 was the last major landmark.

== Geography ==
Map of Bankura District showing CD blocks and municipalities

Ranibandh is located at 22°51′50″N 86°47′05″E.

Ranibandh CD block is located in the south-western part of the district and belongs to the hard rock area.

Ranibandh CD block is bounded by Khatra and Hirbandh CD blocks on the north, Raipur CD block on the east, Binpur II CD block, in Paschim Medinipur district, on the south and Manbazar I, Manbazar II and Bandwan CD blocks, in Purulia district, on the west.

Ranibandh CD block has an area of 428.51 km^{2}. It has 1 panchayat samity, 8 gram panchayats, 90 gram sansads (village councils), 186 mouzas and 169 inhabited villages. Ranibandh and Barikul police stations serve this block. Headquarters of this CD block is at Ranibandh.

Large forests areas exist in Sonamukhi, Joypur, Bishnupur, Khatra and Ranibandh areas.

Gram panchayats of Ranibandh block/ panchayat samiti are: Ambikanagar, Barikul, Haludkanali, Puddi, Rajakata, Ranibandh, Routora and Rudra.

== Demographics ==
=== Population ===
According to the 2011 Census of India, Ranibandh CD block had a total population of 119,089, all of which were rural. There were 60,290 (51%) males and 58,799 (49%) females. Population in the age range of 0 to 6 years was 13,922. Scheduled Castes numbered 13,641 (11.45%) and Scheduled Tribes numbered 56,061 (47.07%).

The concentration of Sabar people, a primitive tribe, is high in Ranibandh and Raipur CD blocks.

Villages in Ranibandh CD block are (2011 census figures in brackets): Ranibandh (2,366), Rautara (2,367), Rudra (2,876), Ambikanagar (3,228), Haludkanali (530), Barikul (988) and Rajakata (2,077).

=== Literacy ===
According to the 2011 census, the total number of literates in Ranibandh CD block was 72,070 (68.53% of the population over 6 years) out of which males numbered 43,074 (81.03% of the male population over 6 years) and females numbered 28,996 (55.75%) of the female population over 6 years). The gender disparity (the difference between female and male literacy rates) was 25.29%.

See also – List of West Bengal districts ranked by literacy rate

Literacy in CD blocks of
Bankura district
Bankura Sadar subdivision
Saltora – 61.45%
Mejia – 66.83%
Gangajalghati – 68.11%
Chhatna – 65.73%
Bankura I – 68.74%
Bankura II – 73.59%
Barjora – 71.67%
Onda – 65.82%
Bishnupur subdivision
Indas – 71.70%
Joypur – 74.57%
Patrasayer – 64.8%
Kotulpur – 78.01%
Sonamukhi – 66.16%
Bishnupur – 66.30%
Khatra subdivision
Indpur – 67.42%
Ranibandh – 68.53%
Khatra – 72.18%
Hirbandh – 64.18%
Raipur – 71.33%
Sarenga – 74.25%
Simlapal – 68.44%
Taldangra – 70.87%
2011 Census: CD Block Wise

Primary Census Abstract Data

=== Religions ===
Religion in Ranibandh CD block (2011)
Hinduism	58.90%
Other (tribal religion)	39.31%
Islam	1.35%
Other or not stated	0.44%

In the 2011 census Hindus numbered 70,145 and formed 58.90% of the population in Ranibandh CD block. Muslims numbered 1,604 and formed 1.35% of the population. Others numbered 47,340 and formed 39.75% of the population. Others include Addi Bassi, Marang Boro, Santal, Saranath, Sari Dharma, Sarna, Alchchi, Bidin, Sant, Saevdharm, Seran, Saran, Sarin, Kheria, and other religious communities. In 2001, Hindus were 55.73%, Muslims 1.19% and tribal religions 42.68% of the population respectively.

=== Languages ===
Languages of Ranibandh CD block (2011)
1. Bengali (60.8%)
2. Santali (31.0%)
3. Kurmali (7.61%)
4. Others (0.61%)

At the time of the 2011 census, 60.77% of the population spoke Bengali, 31.01% Santali and 7.61% Kurmali as their first language.

== Rural poverty ==
In Ranibandh CD block 41.57% families were living below poverty line in 2007. According to the Rural Household Survey in 2005, 28.87% of the total number of families were BPL families in the Bankura district.

Migration has been observed in the following CD blocks of Bankura district: Bankura I, Chhatna, Saltora, Indpur, Ranibandh, Hirbandh, Khatra, Raipur and Sarenga. Although authentic figures are not available, a sample survey has been done. According to the sample survey, around 54.5% to 85.4% of the families on an average migrate from these blocks. Another study shows that around 23% of the people from the under-privileged blocks in the western and southern Bankura migrate. Those migrating belong mostly to the SC or ST population. They migrate for periods varying from 15 days to 6/8 months. Most people migrate to meet their food deficit and go to Bardhaman and Hooghly districts but some go to Gujarat and Maharashtra as construction labour.

== Economy ==
=== Livelihood ===
Livelihood
in Ranibandh CD block
1. Cultivators (22.8%)
2. Agricultural labourers (58.5%)
3. Household industries (5.16%)
4. Other Workers (13.6%)

In the Ranibandh CD block in 2011, among the class of total workers, cultivators numbered 13,103 and formed 22.80%, agricultural labourers numbered 33,602 and formed 58.47%, household industry workers numbered 2,967 and formed 5.16% and other workers numbered 7,801 and formed 3.57%. Total workers numbered 57,473 and formed 48.26% of the total population, and non-workers numbered 61,616 and formed 51.74% of the population.

Note: In the census records a person is considered a cultivator, if the person is engaged in cultivation/ supervision of land owned by self/government/institution. When a person who works on another person's land for wages in cash or kind or share, is regarded as an agricultural labourer. Household industry is defined as an industry conducted by one or more members of the family within the household or village, and one that does not qualify for registration as a factory under the Factories Act. Other workers are persons engaged in some economic activity other than cultivators, agricultural labourers and household workers. It includes factory, mining, plantation, transport and office workers, those engaged in business and commerce, teachers, entertainment artistes and so on.

=== Infrastructure ===
There are 169 inhabited villages in the Ranibandh CD block, as per the District Census Handbook, Bankura, 2011. 100% villages have power supply. 167 villages (98.82%) have drinking water supply. 30 villages (17.75%) have post offices. 141 villages (83.43%) have telephones (including landlines, public call offices and mobile phones). 53 villages (31.36%) have pucca (paved) approach roads and 70 villages (41.42%) have transport communication (includes bus service, rail facility and navigable waterways). 6 villages (3.55%) have agricultural credit societies and 11 villages (6.51%) have banks.

=== Agriculture ===
There were 34 fertiliser depots, 5 seed stores and 45 fair price shops in the Ranibandh CD block.

In 2013–14, persons engaged in agriculture in Ranibandh CD block could be classified as follows: bargadars 2.63%, patta (document) holders 7.50%, small farmers (possessing land between 1 and 2 hectares) 4.84%, marginal farmers (possessing land up to 1 hectare) 25.62% and agricultural labourers 59.40%.

In 2003-04 net area sown in Ranibandh CD block was 15,128 hectares and the area in which more than one crop was grown was 4,389 hectares.

In 2013–14, the total area irrigated in Ranibandh CD block was 4,045 hectares, out of which 2,890 hectares was by canal water, 260 hectares by tank water, 800 hectares by river lift irrigation and 95 hectares by open dug wells.

In 2013–14, Ranibandh CD block produced 46,199 tonnes of Aman paddy, the main winter crop, from 17,982 hectares, 110 tonnes of Aus paddy from 74 hectares, 16 tonnes of wheat from 9 hectares, 206 tonnes of maize from 112 hectares and 6,052 tonnes of potatoes from 207 hectares. It also produced pulses and mustard.

=== Handloom and pottery industries ===
The handloom industry engages the largest number of persons in the non farm sector and hence is important in Bankura district. The handloom industry is well established in all the CD blocks of the district and includes the famous Baluchari saris. In 2004-05 Ranibandh CD Block had 177 looms in operation.

Bankura district is famous for the artistic excellence of its pottery products that include the famous Bankura horse. The range of pottery products is categorised as follows: domestic utilities, terracota and other decorative items and roofing tiles and other heavy pottery items. Around 3,200 families were involved in pottery making in the district in 2002. 285 families were involved in Ranibandh CD block.

=== Banking ===
In 2013–14, Ranibandh CD block had offices of 5 commercial banks and 1 gramin bank.

=== Backward Regions Grant Fund ===
The Bankura district is listed as a backward region and receives financial support from the Backward Regions Grant Fund. The fund, created by the Government of India, is designed to redress regional imbalances in development. As of 2012, 272 districts across the country were listed under this scheme. The list includes 11 districts of West Bengal.

== Transport ==
In 2013–14, Ranibandh CD block had 1 ferry service, 7 originating/ terminating bus routes. The nearest railway station is 60 km from the CD Block headquarters.

State Highway 4 running from Jhalda (in Purulia district) to Digha foreshore (in Purba Medinipur district) and State Highway 5 running from Rupnarayanpur (in Bardhaman district) to Junput (in Purba Medinipur district) pass through this CD block.

== Education ==
In 2013–14, Ranibandh CD block had 159 primary schools with 11,066 students, 17 middle schools with 2,198 students, 4 high schools with 2,300 students and 13 higher secondary schools with 11,007 students. Ranibandh CD Block had 1 general college with 527 students and 339 institutions for special and non-formal education with 7,259 students.

According to the 2011 census, in the Ranibandh CD block, among the 169 inhabited villages, 20 villages did not have a school, 27 villages had two or more primary schools, 39 villages had at least 1 primary and 1 middle school and 20 villages had at least 1 middle and 1 secondary school.

Birsha Munda Memorial College was established in 2010 at Village Pirrah, PO Haludkanali.

Government General Degree College, Ranibandh has been started in 2015 at Rautara.

== Healthcare ==
In 2014, Ranibandh CD block had 1 rural hospital and 4 primary health centres with total 84 beds and 8 doctors. It had 26 family welfare sub centres and 1 family welfare centre. 4,708 patients were treated indoor and 125,317 patients were treated outdoor in the hospitals, health centres and subcentres of the CD block.

Ranibandh Rural Hospital, with 30 beds at Ranibandh, is the major government medical facility in the Ranibandh CD block. There are primary health centres at Jhilimili (with 10 beds), Barikul (with 2 beds), Haludkanali (with 6 beds) and Khejuria (with 6 beds).
