= Kshudiram Tudu =

Indian politician

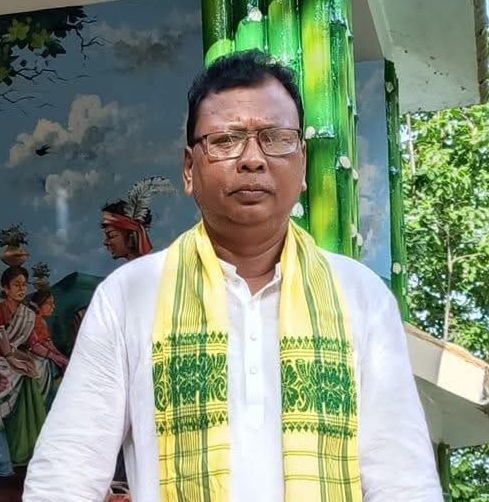

Cabinet Minister, Government of West Bengal
- Incumbent
- Assumed office 9 May 2026
- Governor: R. N. Ravi
- Chief Minister: Suvendu Adhikari
- Departments: Tribal Development Backward Classes Welfare, Minority Affairs and Madrassa Education

Member of the West Bengal Legislative Assembly
- Incumbent
- Assumed office 4 May 2026
- Preceded by: Jyotsna Mandi
- Constituency: Ranibandh (ST)

Personal details
- Born: 1971 (age 54–55) Bagdubi, Bankura, West Bengal
- Citizenship: Indian
- Party: Bharatiya Janata Party
- Spouse: Malati Tudu Hembram
- Children: Chandrani Tudu
- Occupation: Teacher
- Profession: Politician
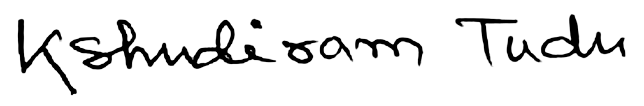
- Signature

Kshudiram Tudu is an Indian politician and member of the Bharatiya Janata Party. Tudu is a tribal leader from the Bankura district - representing Ranibandh, a tribal-dominated constituency in Jungle Mahal. Tudu was engaged in teaching in Burdwan, as a Bengali teacher at Banipith High School. His wife, Malati Tudu Hembram, worked as an ASHA worker in Burdwan. Before joining Banipith High School, Tudu had taught at a school in the Jamarh area of Burdwan.

== Political career ==
He was elected as a Member of the West Bengal Legislative Assembly from the Ranibandh (ST) constituency in the 2026 West Bengal Legislative Assembly election. He won the seat in the West Bengal Assembly election by a margin of more than 52,000 votes against Tanushree Hansda of the Trinamool Congress (TMC).
