= Barikul =

- Village
- Location in West Bengal, India Barikul (India)
- Coordinates: 22°46′14.5″N 86°47′37.3″E
- Country: India
- State: West Bengal
- District: Bankura

Population (2011)
  - Total: 988

Languages*
  - Official: Bengali, Santali, English
- Time zone: UTC+5:30 (IST)
- Lok Sabha constituency: Bankura
- Vidhan Sabha constituency: Ranibandh
- Website: bankura.gov.in

Barikul is a village in the Ranibandh CD block in the Khatra subdivision of the Bankura district in the state of West Bengal, India.

== Geography ==
Places in Khatra subdivision in Bankura district
CT: census town, R: rural/ urban centre, C: craft centre, T: ancient/ temple centre
Owing to space constraints in the small map, the actual locations in a larger map may vary slightly

=== Location ===
Barikul is located at 22°46′14.5″N 86°47′37.3″E.

=== Area overview ===
The map alongside shows the Khatra subdivision of Bankura district. Physiographically, this area is having uneven lands with hard rocks. In the Khatra CD block area there are some low hills. The Kangsabati project reservoir is prominently visible in the map. The subdued patches in the map show forested areas It is an almost fully rural area.

Note: The map alongside presents some of the notable locations in the subdivision. All places marked in the map are linked in the larger full screen map.

== Demographics ==
According to the 2011 Census of India, Barikul had a total population of 988 of which males were 494 (50%) and females= 494 (50%). Population in the age range of 0–6 years was 97. The total number of literate persons in Barikul was 611 (68.57% of the population over 6 years).

- For language details see Ranibandh (community development block)

== Civic administration ==
=== Police station ===
Barikul police station has jurisdiction over a part of the Ranibandh CD block. The area covered is 63177.02 acres with a population of 73,188. The police station was set up in 2005.

== Education ==
Barikul Uday Bharati High School is a Bengali-medium coeducational institution established in 1968. It has facilities for teaching from class V to class XII. The school has 7 computers, a library with 150 books and a playground.

Chhendapathar SKST High School is a Bengali-medium coeducational institution established in 1974. It has facilities for teaching from class V to class XII. The school has 5 computers, a library with 200 books and a playground.

Bhulagara Junior High School is a Bengali-medium co-educational institution established in 2009. It has facilities for teaching from class V to class VIII. The school has a playground.

== Healthcare ==
There is a primary health centre at Barikul, with 2 beds.
