= Jyotsna Mandi =

Indian politician

Minister of State For Food & Supplies (Independent Change), Government of West Bengal
- Incumbent
- Assumed office 10 May 2021
- Governor: Jagdeep Dhankhar; La Ganesan (acting); C. V. Ananda Bose
- Chief Minister: Mamata Banerjee

Member of West Bengal Legislative Assembly
- Incumbent
- Assumed office May 2016
- Preceded by: Deblina Hembram
- Succeeded by: Kshudiram Tudu
- Constituency: Ranibandh

Personal details
- Party: Trinamool Congress
- Spouse: Tuhin Tushar Mandi
- As of 08 MAY, 2026

Jyotsna Mandi is an Indian politician. She was elected to the West Bengal Legislative Assembly from Ranibandh as a member of the Trinamool Congress.
