= Subbhabhumi =

Subbhabhumi was a part of Rarh in ancient times. It is located in what is now Birbhum district in the Indian state of West Bengal. The more fertile eastern part of the district, consisting of alluvial plains, was known as Subbhabhumi.

There is mention of the Rarh region in the Jain text Acaranga Sutra. The last (24th) great Tirthankara Mahavira had wandered through this land, referred to as the "pathless country of Ladha". The people of this region are referred to as ill-mannered and dogs were set upon Mahavira. Some historians have opined that the people of Aryavarta, were not knowledgeable about the areas beyond their territories and often looked down upon the people of those parts. In the religious text Baudhayana Dharmasutra, it is mentioned that those who visited Vanga had to perform penance.

In Raghuvaṃśa of Kalidasa there is mention of the Subbhas.
