= Santiniketan =

UNESCO heritage site in West Bengal, India

Santiniketan Bolpur
- Neighbourhood
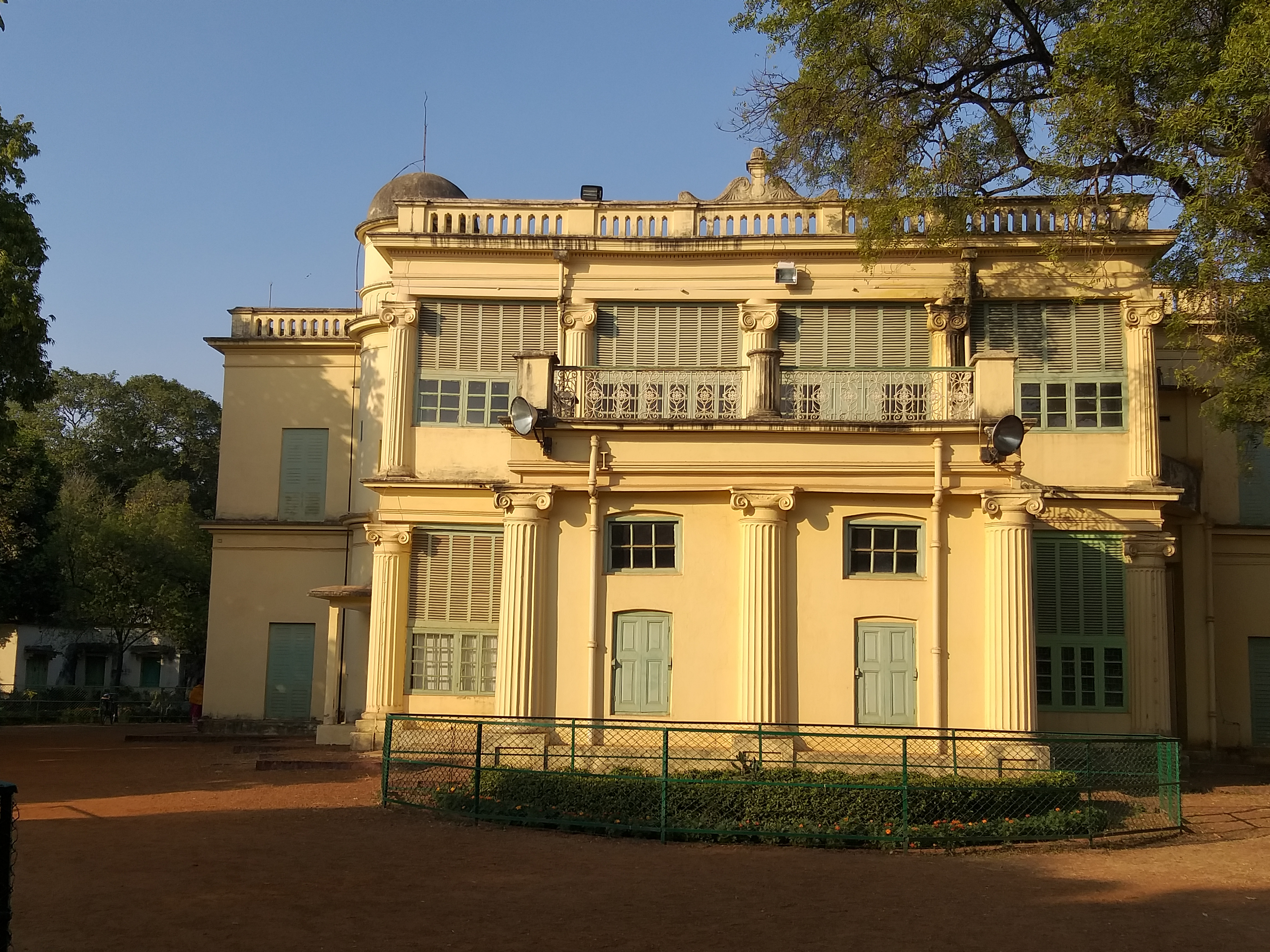
- Santiniketan Griha

- Location within West Bengal
- Coordinates: 23.68°N 87.68°E
- Country: India
- State: West Bengal
- District: Birbhum
- Elevation: 30 m (98 ft)

Languages
  - Official: Bengali, English
- Time zone: UTC+5:30 (IST)
- PIN: 731204 (Bolpur); 731235 (Santiniketan); 731236 (Sriniketan)
- Telephone/STD code: +91 03463
- Lok Sabha constituency: Bolpur
- Vidhan Sabha constituency: Bolpur

UNESCO World Heritage Site
- Official name: Santiniketan
- Criteria: Cultural: (iv)(vi)
- Reference: 1375
- Inscription: 2023 (45th Session)

Santiniketan (IPA: [ʃantiniketɔn]) is a neighbourhood of Bolpur town in the Bolpur subdivision of Birbhum district in West Bengal, India, approximately 152 km north of Kolkata. It was established by Debendranath Tagore, and later expanded by his son, Rabindranath Tagore whose vision became what is now a university town with the creation of Visva-Bharati. It is also the birthplace of Indian Nobel Laureate Amartya Sen, who was also an alumnus of the school.

It was inscribed on the UNESCO World Heritage List by the World Heritage Committee in 2023.

== History ==
In 1863, Debendranath Tagore took on permanent lease 20 acres (81,000 m^{2}) of land, with two chhatim (Alstonia scholaris) trees, at an annual payment of Rs. 5, from Bhuban Mohan Sinha, the talukdar in Raipur, Birbhum. He built a guest house there and named it Santiniketan (the abode of peace). Gradually, the whole area came to be known as Santiniketan.

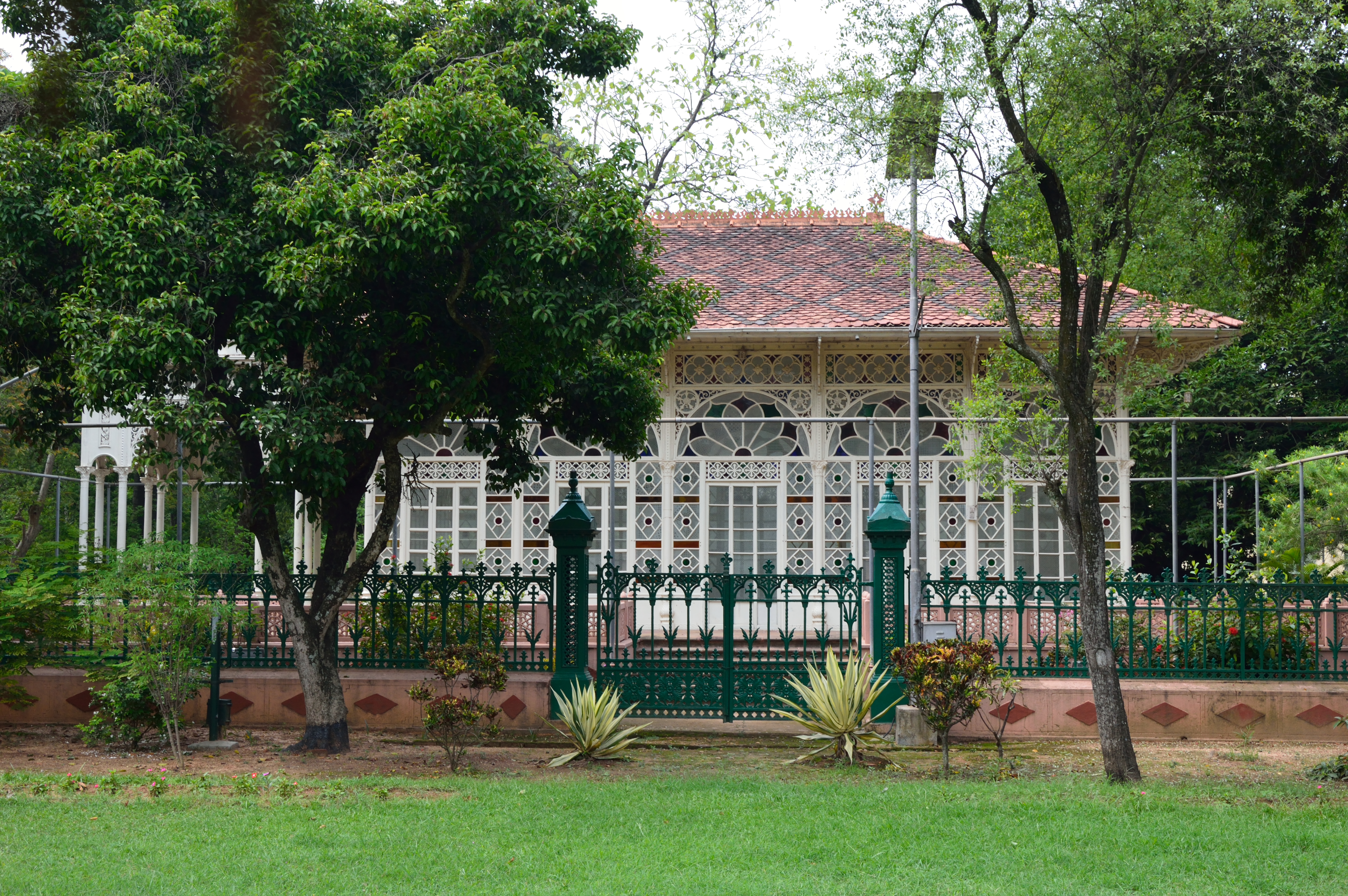
Upasana Griha, the glass prayer hall Devendranath built

Binoy Ghosh says that Bolpur was a small place in the middle of the 19th century. It grew as Shantiniketan grew. A certain portion of Bolpur was a part of the zamindari of the Sinha family of Raipur. Bhuban Mohan Sinha had developed a small village in the Bolpur area and named it Bhubandanga. It was just opposite Santiniketan in those days. Bhubandanga was the den of a gang of notorious dacoits, who had no compunction in killing people. It led to a situation of conflict and confrontation, but the leader of the gang, ultimately, surrendered to Debendranath, and they started helping him in developing the area. There was a chhatim tree under which Debendranath used to meditate. Inspired by The Crystal Palace built originally in Hyde Park, London, to house the Great Exhibition of 1851 and later relocated, Debendranath constructed a 60-foot × 30-foot hall for Brahmo prayers. The roof was tiled and the floor had white marble, but the rest of the structure was made of glass. From its earliest days, it was a great attraction for people from all around.

While travelling to the Himalayas, Rabindranath Tagore first visited on February 1873 when he was 12 years old. In 1888, Debendranath dedicated the entire property for the establishment of a Brahmavidyalaya through a trust deed. In 1901, Rabindranath started a Brahmacharyaashrama and it came to be known as Patha Bhavana from 1925. In 1913, Rabindranath Tagore won the Nobel Prize in Literature. It was a new feather in the cap of the Tagore family which was the leading family contributing to the enrichment of life and society in Bengal in many fields of activity over a long period of time. The environment at Jorasanko Thakur Bari, one of the bases of the Tagore family in Kolkata, was filled with literature, music, painting, and theatre. Founded in 1921 by Rabindranath Tagore, Visva Bharati was declared to be a central university and an institute of national importance, in 1951.

== Topography ==
Cities and towns in Bolpur subdivision of Birbhum district
M: municipal city/ town, CT: census town, R: rural/ urban centre, U: University.
Owing to space constraints in the small map, the actual locations in a larger map may vary slightly

=== Location ===
Santiniketan is situated at 23.68°N 87.68°E. at an average elevation of 56 metres (187 feet).

The area is flanked on two sides by the rivers, the Ajay and the Kopai. Santiniketan earlier had an extensive forest cover, but substantial soil erosion gave certain areas a barren look, the resulting phenomenon is locally known as khoai. However, as a result of the consistent efforts by botanists, plants and trees from all over India flourish in parts of the town. Although the overall environment of the surrounding areas have changed with time, the core area of Santiniketan has retained its closeness with nature.

Note: The map alongside presents some of the notable locations in the area. All places marked in the map are linked in the larger full screen map.

In the 2011 census, Santiniketan is not identified as a separate place. In the map of Bolpur-Sriniketan CD block on page 718 of District Census Handbook Birbhum (Part A), the area occupied by Santiniketan is shown as a part of Bolpur municipal area and Sriniketan is shown as a part of Surul, a census town.

=== Notable places ===
As per the Human Development Report for Birbhum in 2009, Santiniketan attracted 1.2 million tourists annually.

Rabindra Bhavana, founded in 1942, just after the death of the poet, is the focal point of Visva Bharati. It has a museum, archives, library and other units. It houses a major part of Rabindranath's manuscripts, correspondence, paintings and sketches, 40,000 volumes of books and 12,000 volumes of bound journals, photographs and numerous items associated with the poet's life. It is generally one of the first points of interest for anybody visiting Santiniketan. It was established by the poet's son, Rathindranath Tagore, as a memorial museum and research centre for Tagore studies.

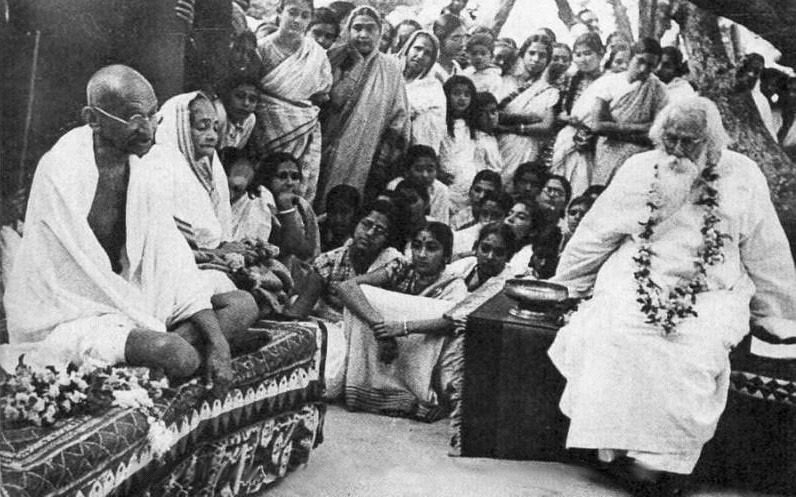
Rabindranath Tagore with Mahatma Gandhi and Kasturba Gandhi at Santiniketan in 1940

The Uttarayana Complex, which lies in the northern portion of the town and is located next to Rabindra Bhavana, features a collection of five houses built by Rabindranath – Udayan, Shyamali, Konark, Udichi and Punascha. The gardens in the Uttarayan complex were planned and laid out by Rathindranath. Shyamali and Konark are mud houses. Shyamali was an experiment. The visual perspective was based on the Borobudur style. The entire outside wall was decorated with beautiful relief work by Kala Bhavana students under the guidance of Nandalal Bose. The Santals on either side of the main door and on the eastern corner were by Ramkinkar Baij. Mahatma Gandhi and Kasturba Gandhi stayed in the house as guests. Udayan is the most imposing house in the Uttarayan complex. It is meant for important guests visiting Santiniketan. Each suite in Udayan is on a different level which gives this house its individuality. In 2013, Visva Bharati opened a museum Guha Ghar, in the Uttarayan complex, in memory of Rathindranath Tagore.

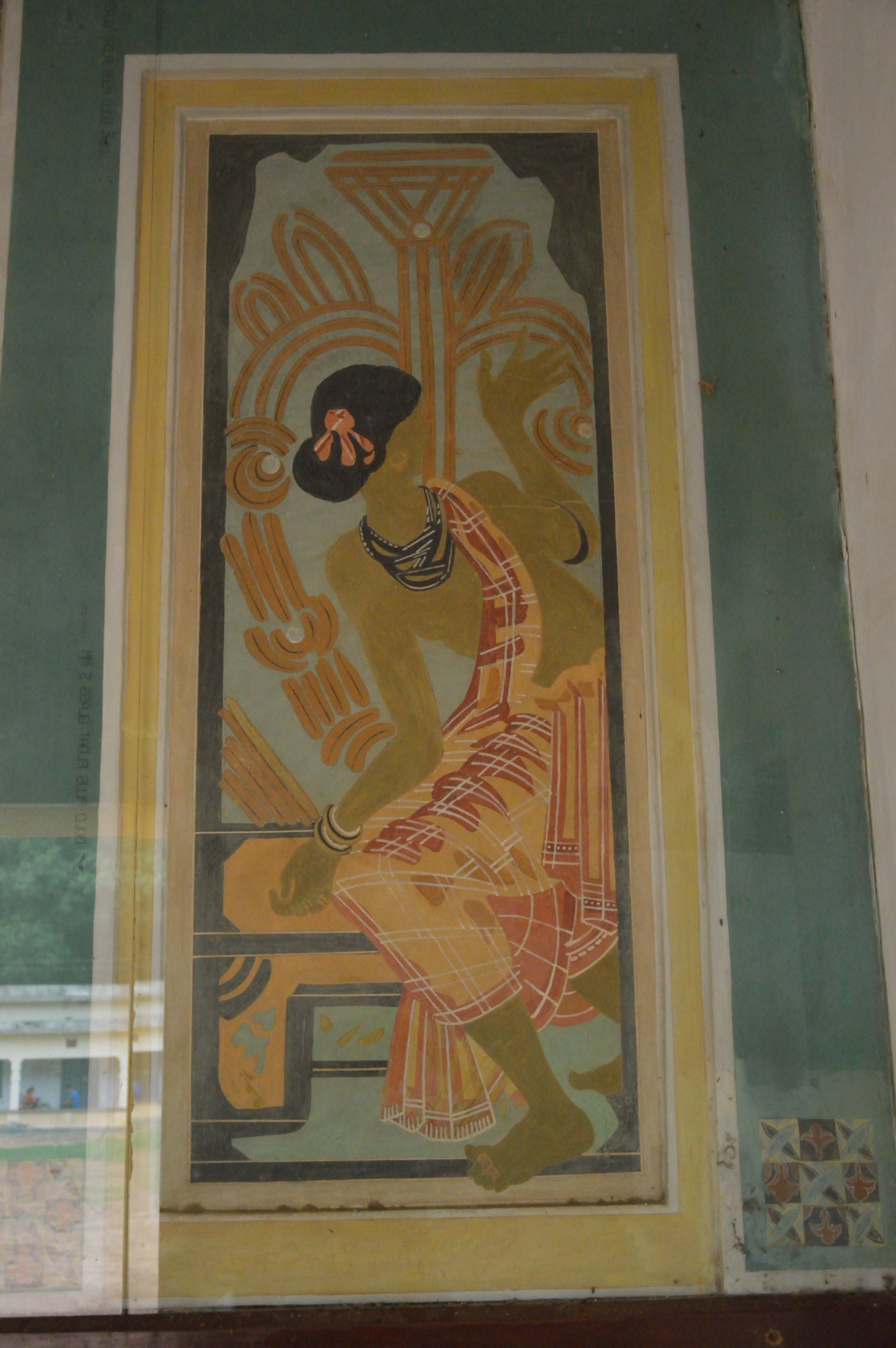
Mural by Nandalal Bose

The Ashram Complex is the oldest area of Santiniketan, where Debendranath built the Santiniketan Griha and the beautiful stained glass prayer hall, in the second half of the 19th century. Patha Bhavana came up after Rabindranath started residing in Santiniketan. It has beautiful frescoes by Nandalal Bose. Natun Bari was built in 1902 for residential purposes. Kalo Bari is a unique structure of mud and coal tar and profusely decorated. There are numerous other houses: Dehali, Santoshalaya, Singha Sadan, Dwijaviram, Dinantika, Taladwaj, Chaitya, Ghantatala, Panthasala, Ratan Kuthi, Malancha and others – each with an interesting story that makes it historically relevant.

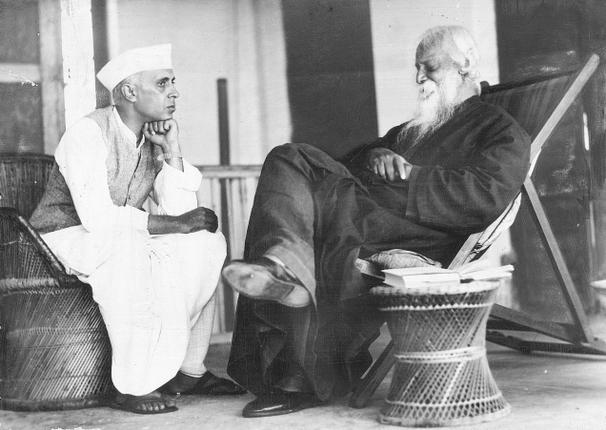
Jawaharlal Nehru with Rabindranath Tagore in 1940

Visva Bharati was established as a centre for culture with the objective of exploring the arts, language, humanities, music etc. Specialised institutes came up in different fields, such as Cheena Bhavana, Hindi Bhavana, Kala Bhavana, Sangit Bhavana, Bhasa Bhavana, Nippon Bhavana, Bangladesh Bhavana and others. Many of these institutes with myriad structures have been decorated by illustrious artists.

"The landscape of Santiniketan is dotted with sculptures by Ramkinkar Baij (1906–1980), larger-than-life figures of Santals who were in reality part of the landscape. A Santal family, complete with dog, a group of workers running along at the call of the mill, their clothes flying in the air, a thresher, all situated along the main road. When Ramkinkar created Sujata, an elongated figure of one of the disciples of Buddha, he placed it just a little distance from the seated Buddha. Nandalal planted Eucalyptus saplings in the area, knowing that one day these tall trees would be a perfect setting to Ramkinkar's Sujata. It was Nandalal Bose, who created an environment where art would be a part of life and the children of Santiniketan have grown absorbing these beautiful monuments as they have the oxygen in the air."

== The Tagore family at Santiniketan ==
She is our own, the darling of our hearts,

Santiniketan.
In the shadows of her trees we meet
in the freedom of her open sky.
Our dreams are rocked in her arms.
Her face is a fresh wonder of love every
time we see her,
for she is our own, the darling of our

hearts.

— Rabindranath Tagore,

Santiniketan was founded and developed by members of the Tagore family. It was founded by Debendranath Tagore. Rabindranath Tagore wrote many of his literary classics at Santiniketan. His son, Rathindranath Tagore was one of the first five students at the Brahmacharya asrama at Santiniketan. After the death of his father in 1941, Rathindranath took over the burden of all responsibilities at Santiniketan. When Visva Bharati was made a central university in 1951, Rathindranath was appointed its first vice-chancellor.

Pratima Devi, Rathindranath's wife, had active links with Visva Bharati from a very young age. She lived in Santinketan till her death in 1969.

Mira Devi, Rabindranath's youngest daughter, after her failed marriage, lived in Malancha built for her in the Ashrama complex in 1926. She died at Santiniketan in 1969. Krishna Kripalani, husband of Nandita (Buri), daughter of Mira Devi, taught at Santiniketan for nearly 15 years, beginning 1933. Krishna Kripalani's biography of Tagore was amongst the best ever written.

Dwijendranath Tagore, Rabindranath's eldest brother, spent the last twenty years of his life at Santiniketan. He lived in Dwaijaviram in the Ashrama complex.

Dinendranath Tagore, Dwijendranath's grandson, was principal of Sangit Bhavana in its earliest years. Dinantika, built in 1939, housed the Cha chakra, where staff members of Visva Bharati met over a cup of tea for meetings and relaxation.

Indira Devi Chaudhurani, daughter of Satyendranath Tagore, started living in Santiniketan in 1941 and took charge of Sangit Bhavana. She was acting vice-chancellor for a short period.

Members of the Tagore family continue to live and work near Santiniketan.

== Photo gallery ==
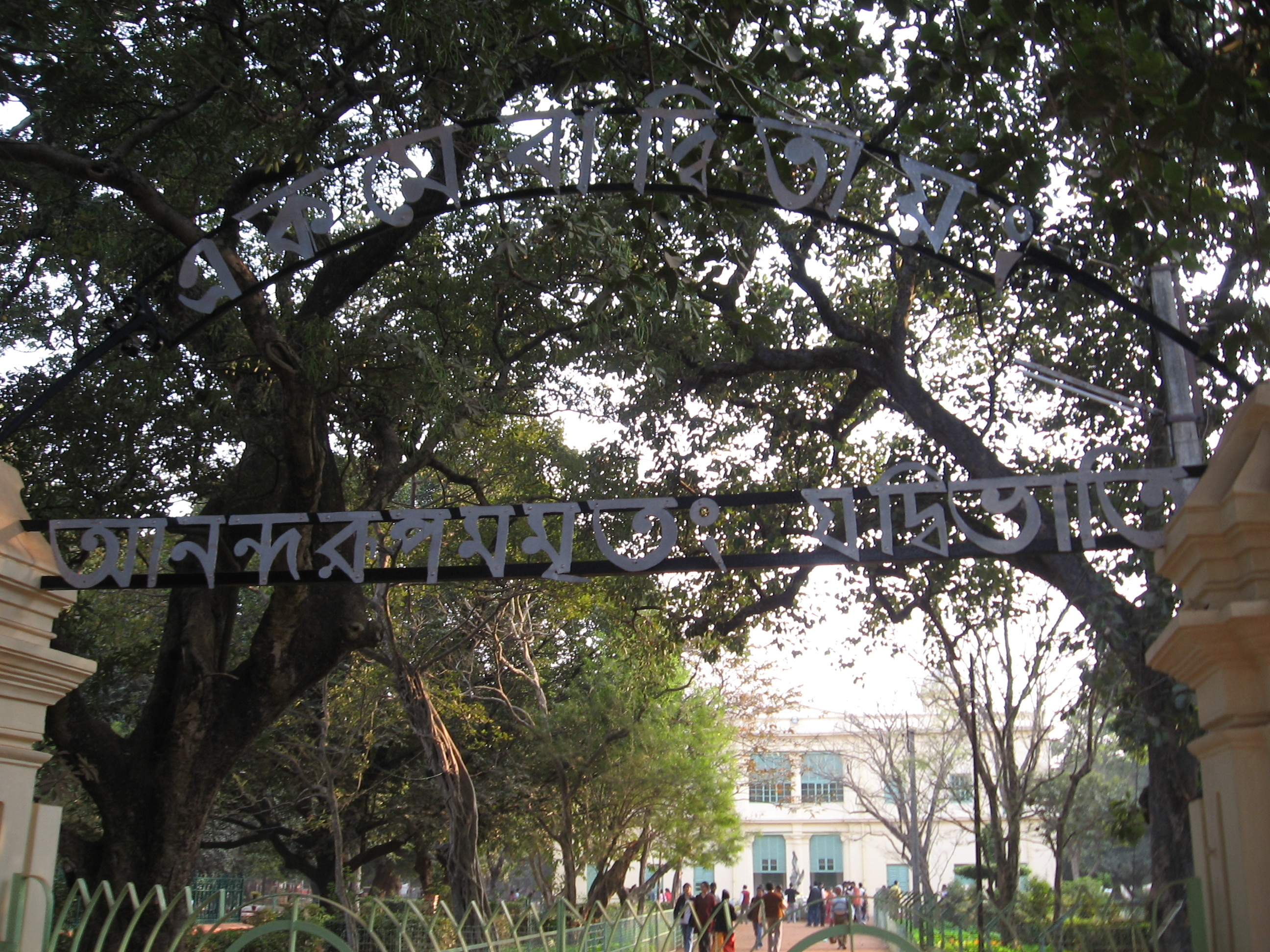
Santiniketan Griha

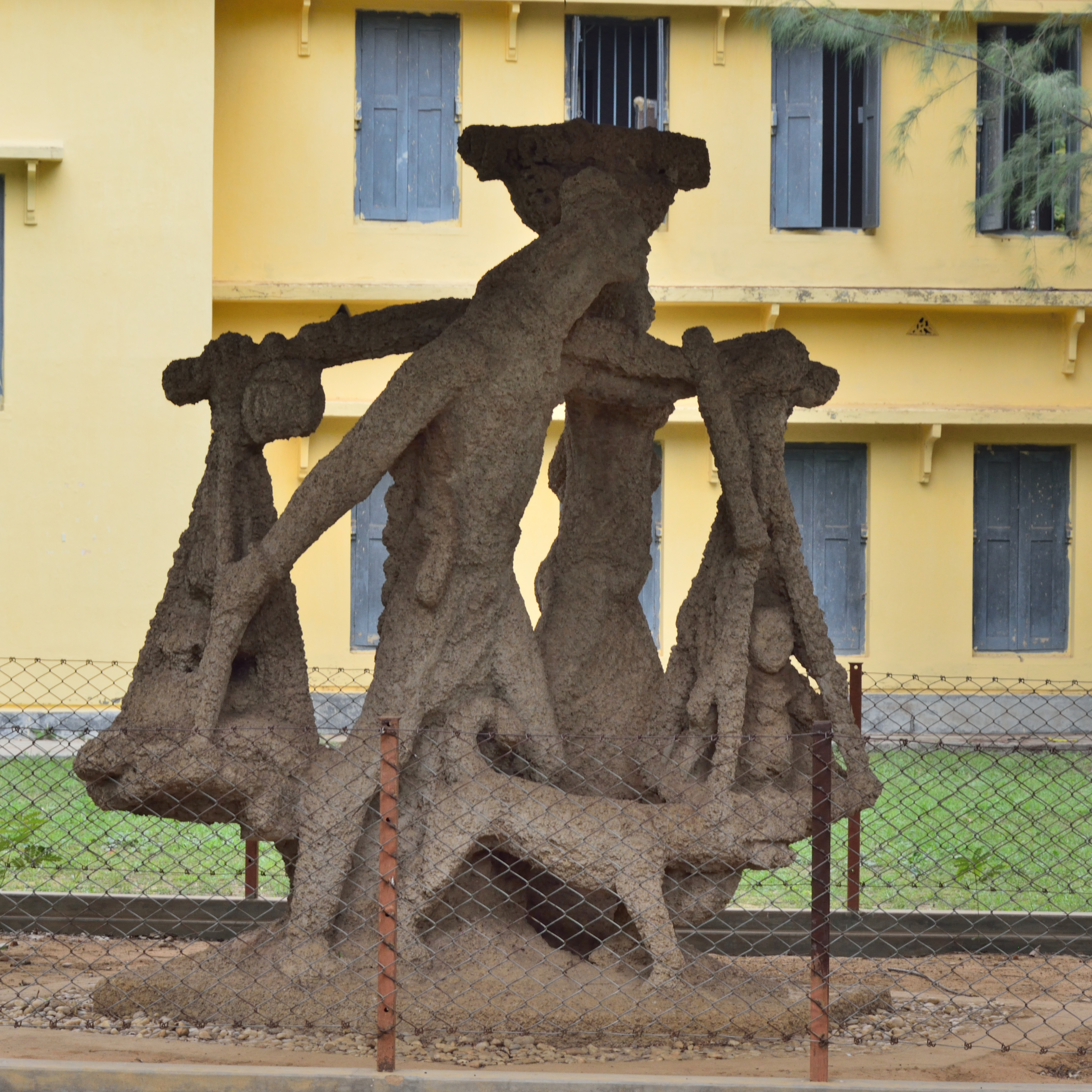
Santal family by Ramkinkar Baij

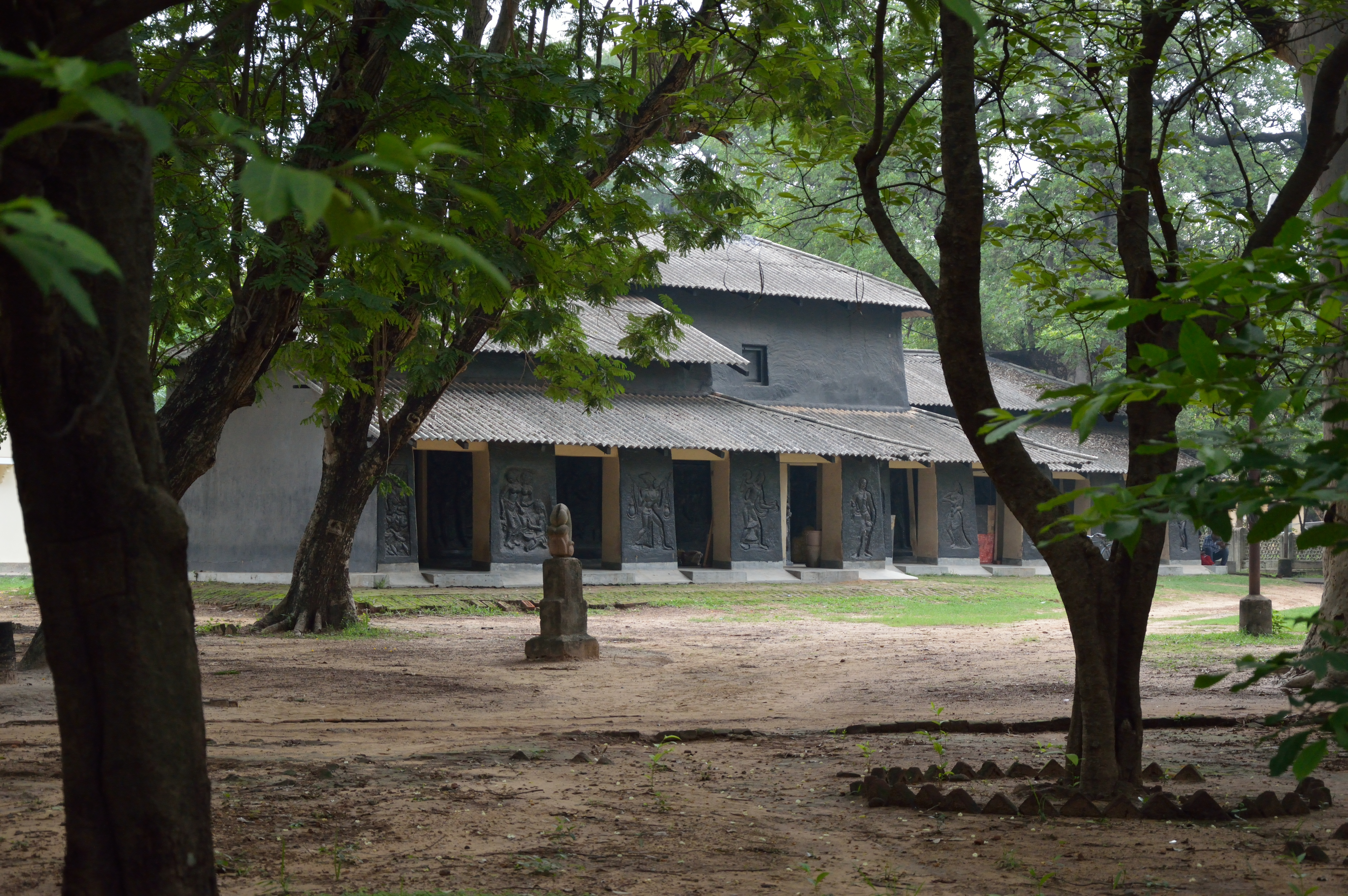
Kalo Bari – the house built with mud and coal tar. Click on the pic to enlarge for a glimpse of the wall decoration.

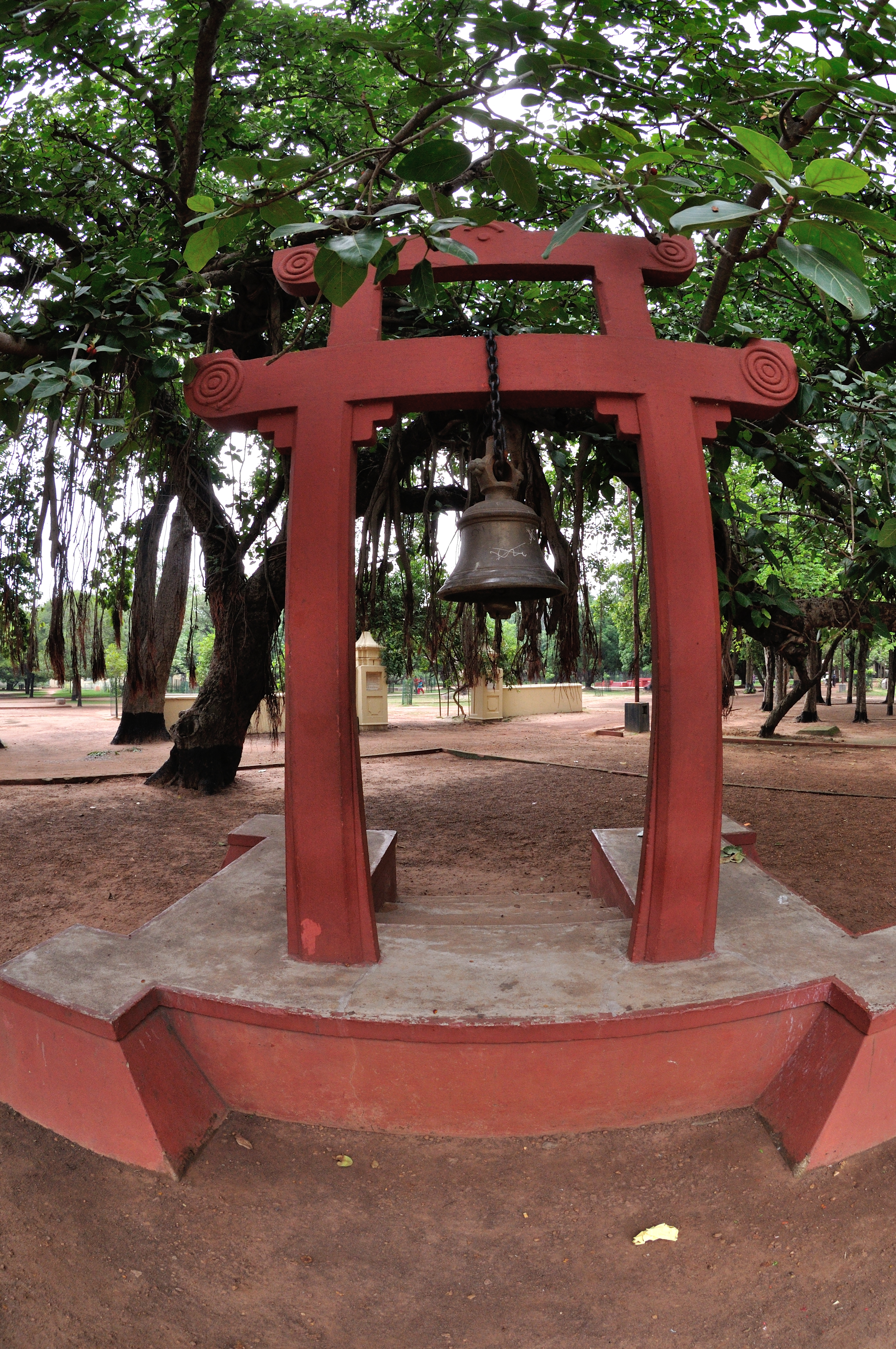
Ghantatala – the bell stand

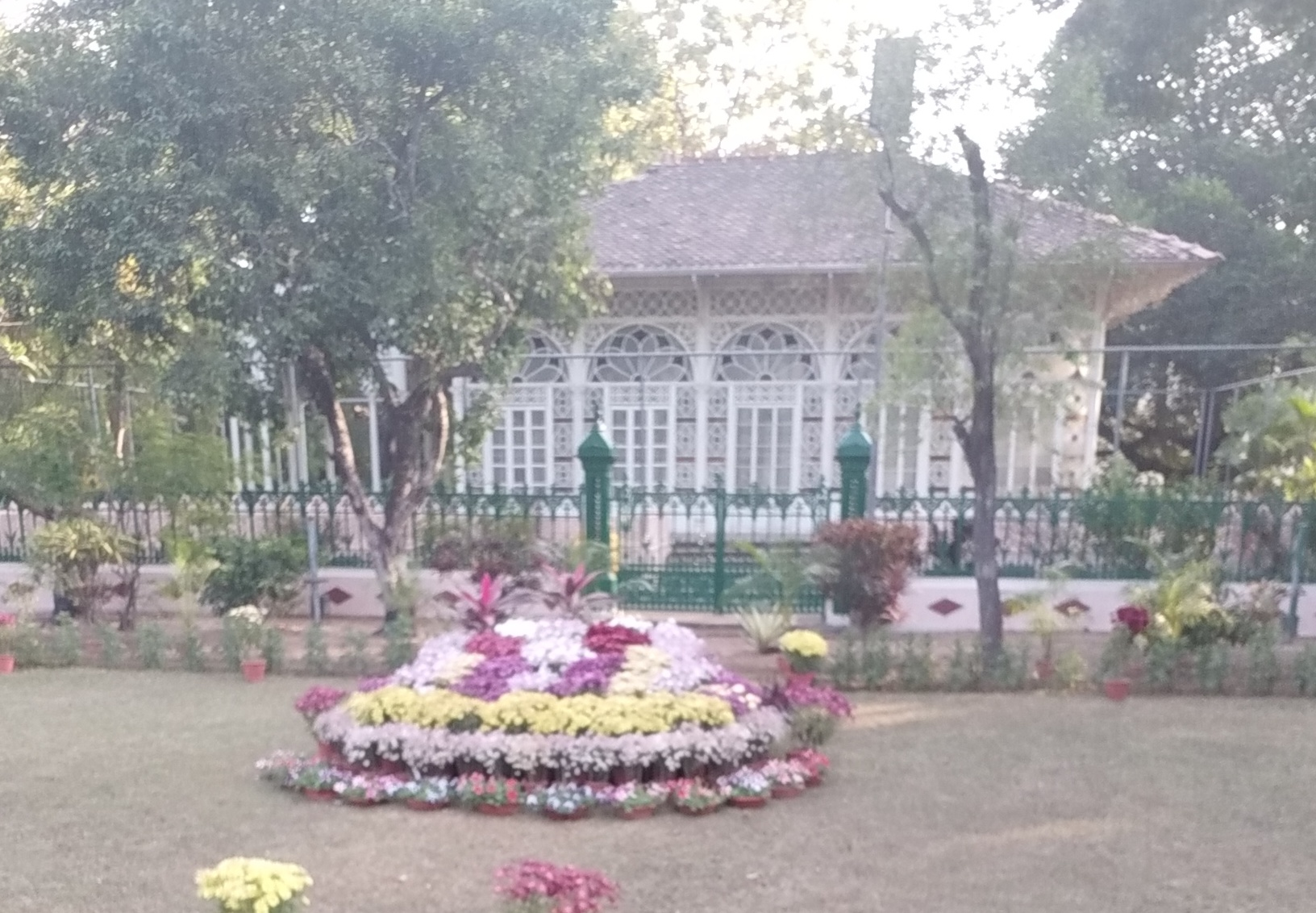
Upasana Griha at Santiniketan

== Climate ==
The climate of Santiniketan is moderately warm, with summer temperatures at around 35-42 °C (maximum) and winter at 10-15 °C (minimum). Summer is felt for three months, March, April and May. December, January and February are the winter months. June, July, August and September see heavy rainfall, these four months are known as monsoon (rainy season). Santiniketan saw its highest temperature rising 47.0 °C, on 10 June 1966. The lowest temperature ever recorded is 4.9 °C, on 9 January 2013. The annual average temperature is 26.2 °C. About 1480mm of rain falls per year, with 76 days seeing the rain. The area is classified as an "Aw" (tropical savanna climate) under the Köppen Climate Classification.

Climate data for Santiniketan (Sriniketan) (1991–2020 normals, extremes 1961–2020)
Month	Jan	Feb	Mar	Apr	May	Jun	Jul	Aug	Sep	Oct	Nov	Dec	Year
Record high °C (°F)	33.0 (91.4)	37.0 (98.6)	42.0 (107.6)	45.9 (114.6)	46.6 (115.9)	47.0 (116.6)	41.6 (106.9)	36.8 (98.2)	39.1 (102.4)	37.1 (98.8)	34.2 (93.6)	31.8 (89.2)	47.0 (116.6)
Mean daily maximum °C (°F)	24.7 (76.5)	28.5 (83.3)	33.6 (92.5)	36.5 (97.7)	36.7 (98.1)	35.4 (95.7)	33.1 (91.6)	32.8 (91.0)	32.8 (91.0)	31.9 (89.4)	29.7 (85.5)	26.1 (79.0)	31.8 (89.2)
Mean daily minimum °C (°F)	11.1 (52.0)	14.6 (58.3)	19.4 (66.9)	23.5 (74.3)	25.1 (77.2)	26.1 (79.0)	26.1 (79.0)	26.1 (79.0)	25.5 (77.9)	22.5 (72.5)	17.3 (63.1)	12.7 (54.9)	20.8 (69.4)
Record low °C (°F)	4.9 (40.8)	6.0 (42.8)	11.2 (52.2)	14.6 (58.3)	18.1 (64.6)	18.7 (65.7)	20.0 (68.0)	22.4 (72.3)	17.7 (63.9)	15.6 (60.1)	9.7 (49.5)	6.1 (43.0)	4.9 (40.8)
Average rainfall mm (inches)	12.6 (0.50)	20.2 (0.80)	28.4 (1.12)	53.9 (2.12)	113.1 (4.45)	216.2 (8.51)	341.9 (13.46)	290.7 (11.44)	258.4 (10.17)	102.9 (4.05)	5.9 (0.23)	8.6 (0.34)	1,452.7 (57.19)
Average rainy days	1.2	1.7	1.9	3.6	6.3	11.2	15.6	14.5	11.3	4.8	0.7	0.4	73.3
Average relative humidity (%) (at 17:30 IST)	60	52	45	50	59	73	82	82	83	80	70	65	67
Source: India Meteorological Department

== Transport ==
Bolpur Shantiniketan railway station is well connected with Sealdah Railway Station, Howrah Station, Kolkata Railway Station, Malda Town, New Jalpaiguri etc. of West Bengal & Guwahati Railway Station of Assam.

There is direct AC Volvo bus service of WBTC from Kolkata to Bolpur Shantiniketan (Kolkata-Bolpur-Suri & Suri-Bolpur-Kolkata).

Bus and private cars are available from Kolkata (outstation cab service of Ola Cabs, Uber from Kolkata), Durgapur City Centre Bus Stop, Katwa, Berhampore and soon from Santragachi Railway Station in Howrah.

== About Visva Bharati ==
Santiniketan is a university town with varied educational facilities. At the school level are Patha Bhavana and Siksha Satra. Apart from a number of courses in humanities, science and education, Visva-Bharati offers a range of music, dance and art courses and lays emphasis on language courses. Sangit Bhavana offers courses in Rabindra Sangit, Hindustani classical vocal, sitar, esraj, tabla, pakhawaj, Kathakali dance and Manipuri dance. Kala Bhavana offers courses in painting, mural, sculpture, graphic art, design (textiles/ ceramics) and history of art. The university offers specialised 4-year courses in Persian, Tibetan, Chinese and Japanese. Bhasa Bhavana offers undergraduate and post-graduate courses in Arabic & Persian, Bengali, Chinese, Hindi, Indo-Tibetan, Japanese, Odia, Santali and Sanskrit. Vidya Bhavana offers 1-year courses in Arabic, Bengali, Chinese, French, German, Hindi, Italian, Japanese, Marathi, Odia, Pali, Persian, Russian, Sanskrit, Santali, Tamil, Tibetan and Urdu. It also offers 2-year courses in Arabic, Assamese, Bengali, Chinese, French, German, Hindi, Italian, Japanese, Marathi, Odia, Pali, Persian, Russian, Sanskrit, Santali, Tamil, Tibetan and Urdu. There are certificate courses in leather craft, book binding & hand-made packaging, batik work and hand-made paper making. Shantiniketan offers courses in the field of agriculture and rural development. Only a selective list is presented here to give an idea of the range of courses offered.

== Culture ==
The town is known for its literary and artistic heritage, with the notable figures being Rabindranath Tagore and Nandalal Bose. In addition, the Visva Bharati also serves as Shantiniketan's cultural center.

== Poush Mela ==
In Birbhum district, the fairs (mela in Bengali) are spread right across the district and are thought of as an extension of the concept of markets, a place of not only trade and business but also a meeting place of people and an arena for cultural exchange. The largest and most notable fair is the Poush Mela held at Santiniketan for three days from 7 Poush. Devendranath Tagore with twenty followers accepted the Brahmo creed from Ram Chandra Vidyabagish on 21 December 1843 (7 Poush 1250 according to the Bengali calendar). This was the basis of Poush Utsav (the Festival of Poush) at Santiniketan.

== Festivals at Shantiniketan ==
In Shantiniketan, seasonal changes bring their own colors and beauties with various festivals. The emphasis in organising these festivals is on traditional Indian forms and rituals. Numerous festivals range from Basanta Utsav and Barsha Mangal to Maghotsav and Rabindra Jayanti. Holi, the festival of colours, is celebrated in its own style at Santiniketan – it is called Basanta Utsav and welcomes the arrival of spring. The programme starts from the morning with singing and dancing to Tagore's tunes by the students and ends with spreading coloured powders (called ‘abir’) and expression of festive wishes. After the formal Visva Bharati programme, other programmes follow. Barsha Mangal is celebrated with cultural programmes in July–August. Ananda Bazar is a fair for handicrafts by the students, held on Mahalaya day. Prior to leaving for the puja vacations students celebrate Sharad Utsav. To celebrate the birthday of Rabindranath Thakur, the birth anniversary of the poet's son with a small mela held in Sriniketan called "Rathindra Mela" by the students of the institute. Nandan Mela marks Nandalal Bose's birth anniversary (on 1–2 December) and is a special attraction for art lovers. Briksharopan and Halkarshan emphasise man's closeness to nature and are held on 22-23 Shraavana (August). Maghotsab, celebrating the founding of the Brahmo Samaj, is held on 11 Magh (towards the end of January). Various anniversaries and cultural programmes are organised throughout the year. 25 Baisakh (7-8 May) is the birthday of Rabindranath Tagore but his birth anniversary is celebrated along with and subsequent to the Bengali New Year (mid April onwards).

== Sinha Sadan ==
Shantiniketan was originally a part of the ancestral zamindari of the Sinha family of Raipur, Birbhum. Satyendra Prasanna Sinha, 1st Baron Sinha donated for the construction of Sinha Sadan with a clock tower and bell. It was in this building that Oxford University conferred its honorary doctorate on the poet, Rabindranath Tagore.

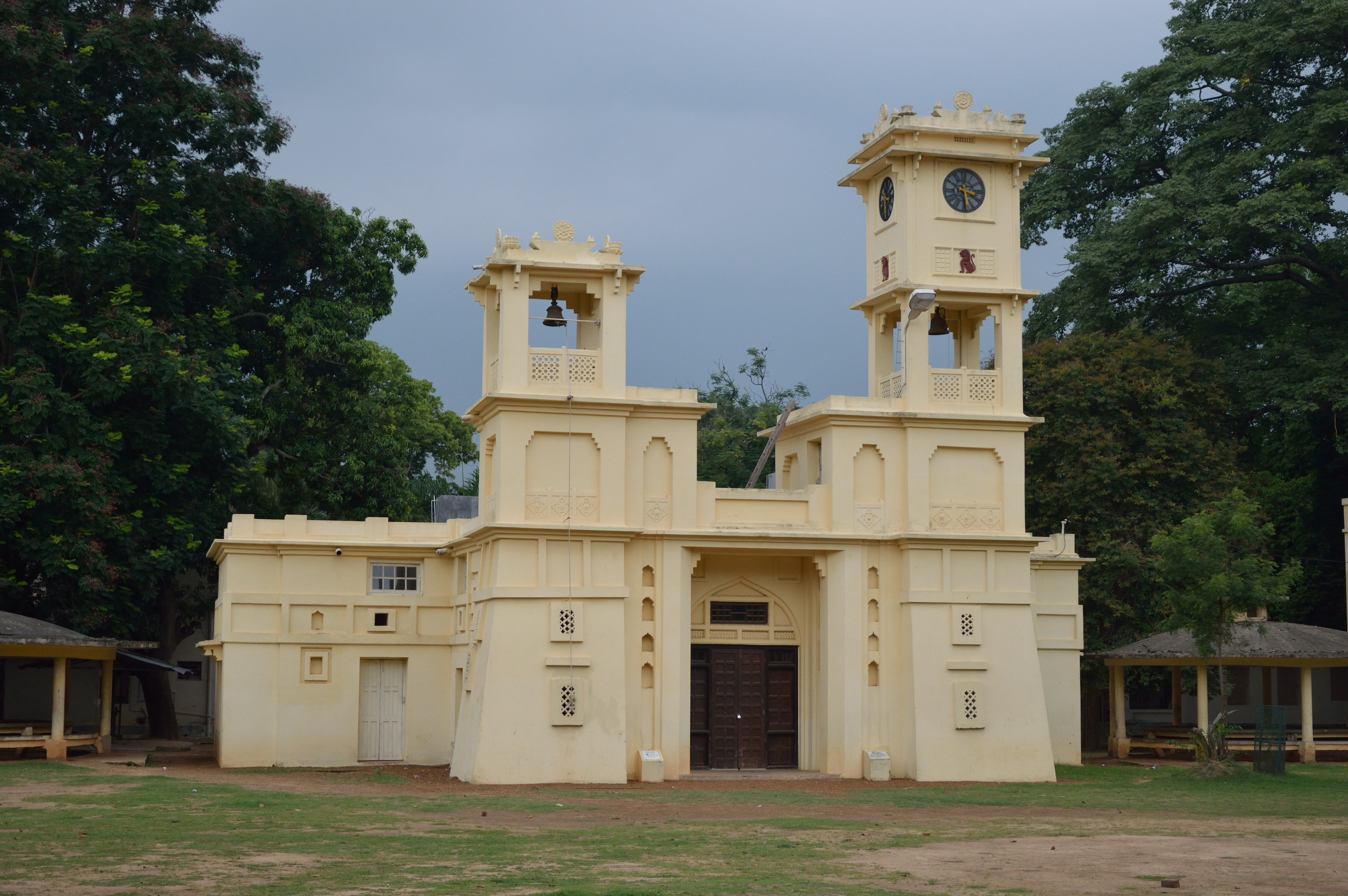
Sinha Sadan

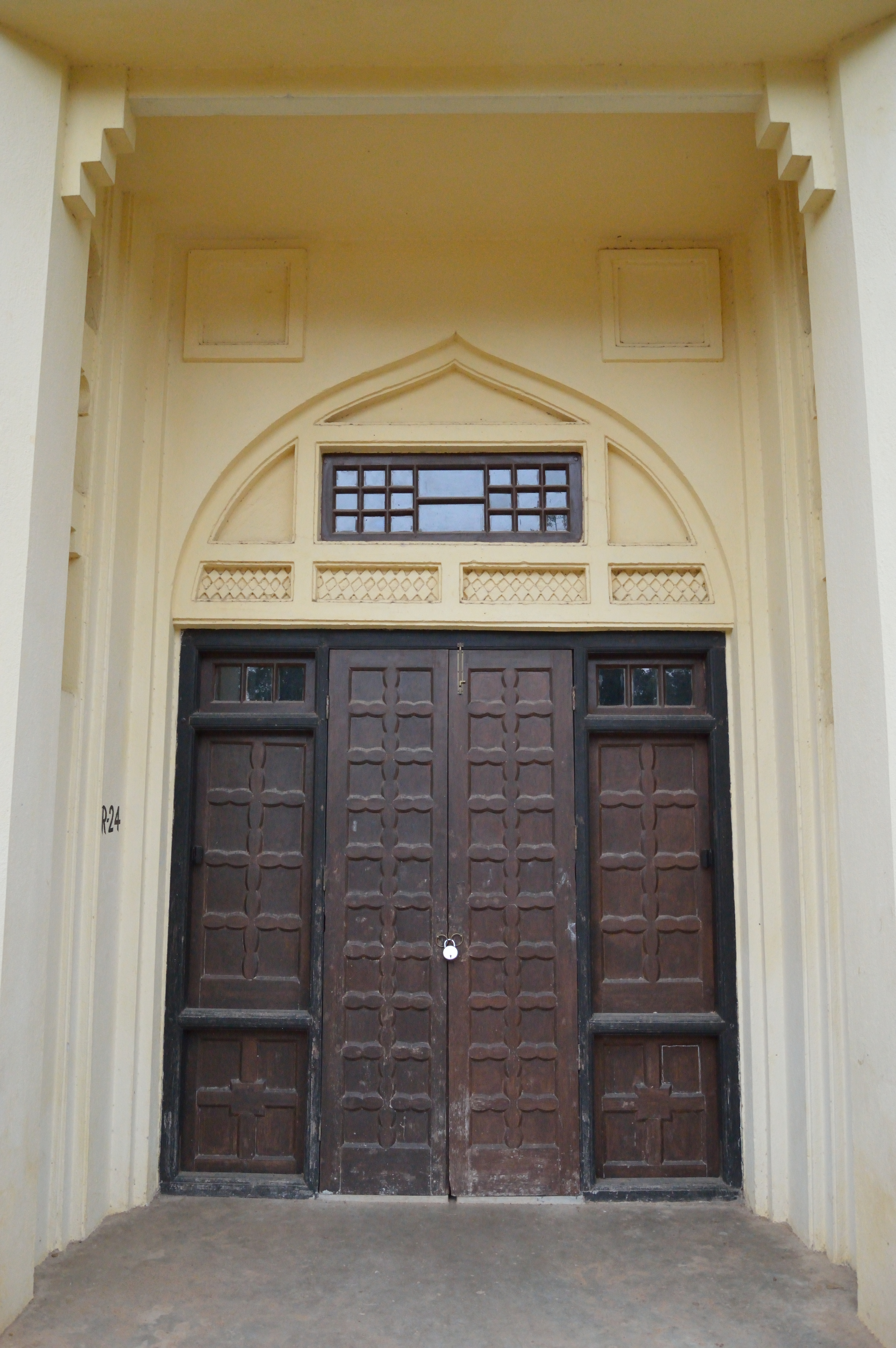
Doorway, Sinha Sadan

== Ballabhpur Wildlife Sanctuary ==
Ballabhpur Wildlife Sanctuary is located 3 km from Shantiniketan and is popular as Deer Park. Established in 1977, it was a khoai area affected by soil erosion. It is now a large wooded area with herds of deer and makes a natural bird sanctuary.

== Amar Kutir ==
Amar Kutir (meaning: my cottage), once a place of refuge for independence movement activists has been turned into a cooperative society for the promotion of arts and crafts. It is located on the banks of the Kopai River, about 15 kilometres (9.3 mi) from the central areas of Santiniketan.

== Sonajhuri haat ==
Except Wednesday, one can visit the haat (or market) at Sonajhuri, close to Shantiniketan. This is a village market where one can buy local handicrafts and listen to folk music sung by tribal groups.

== Around Santiniketan picture gallery ==
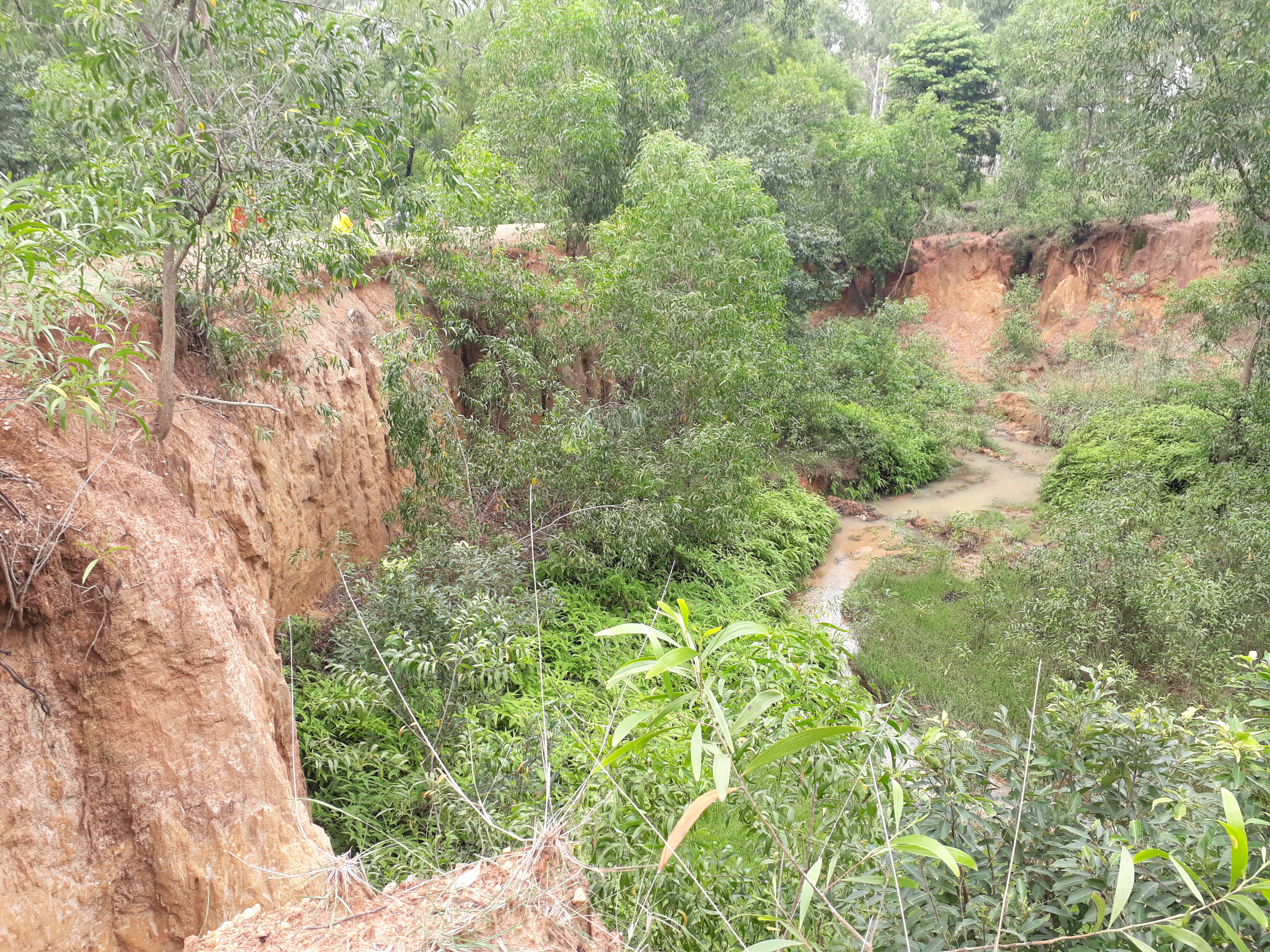
Khoai at Santiniketan

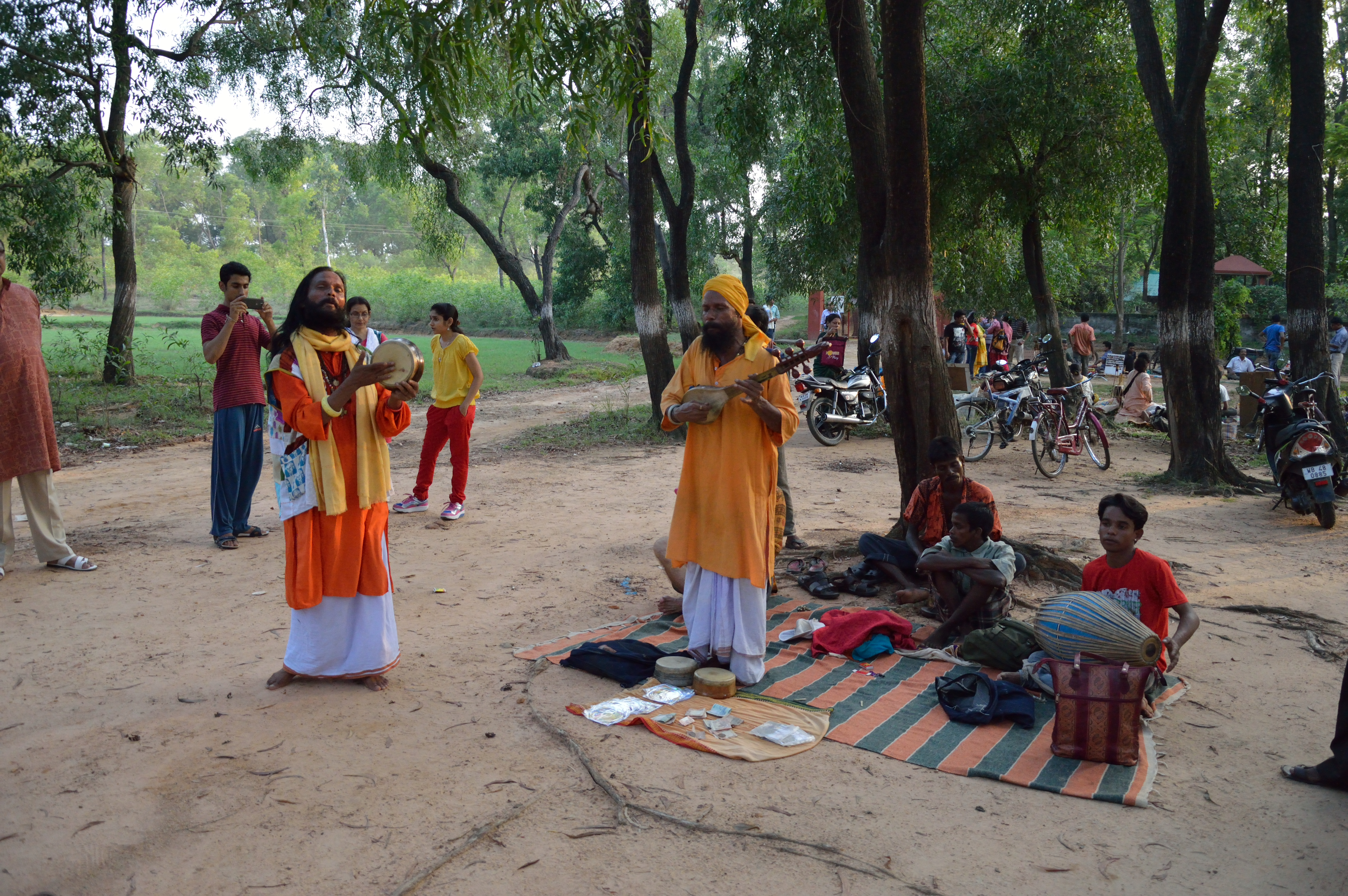
Baul performance at Sonajhuri Saturday haat

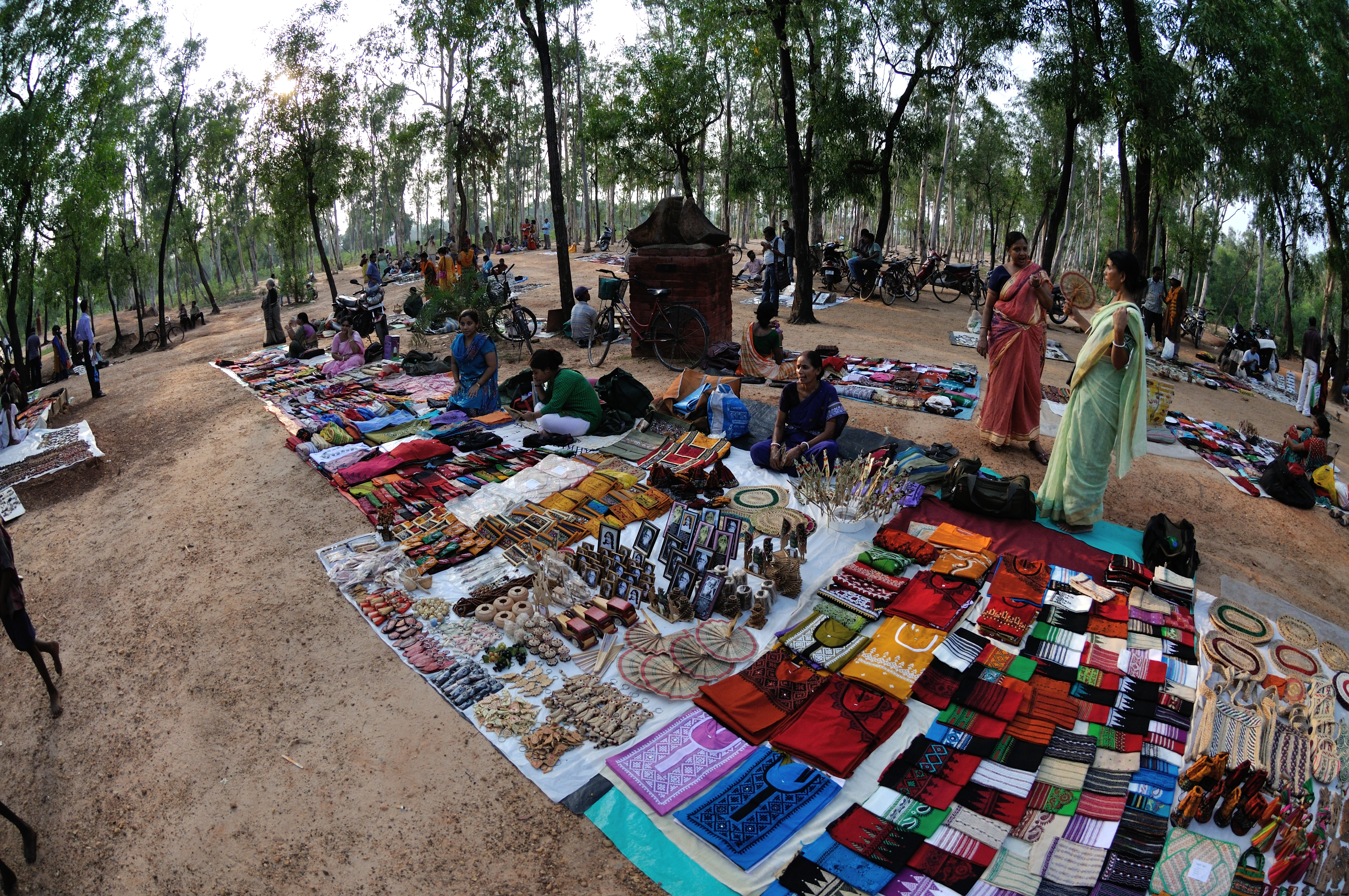
Local village hndicrafts and other items at Sonajhuri Saturday haat

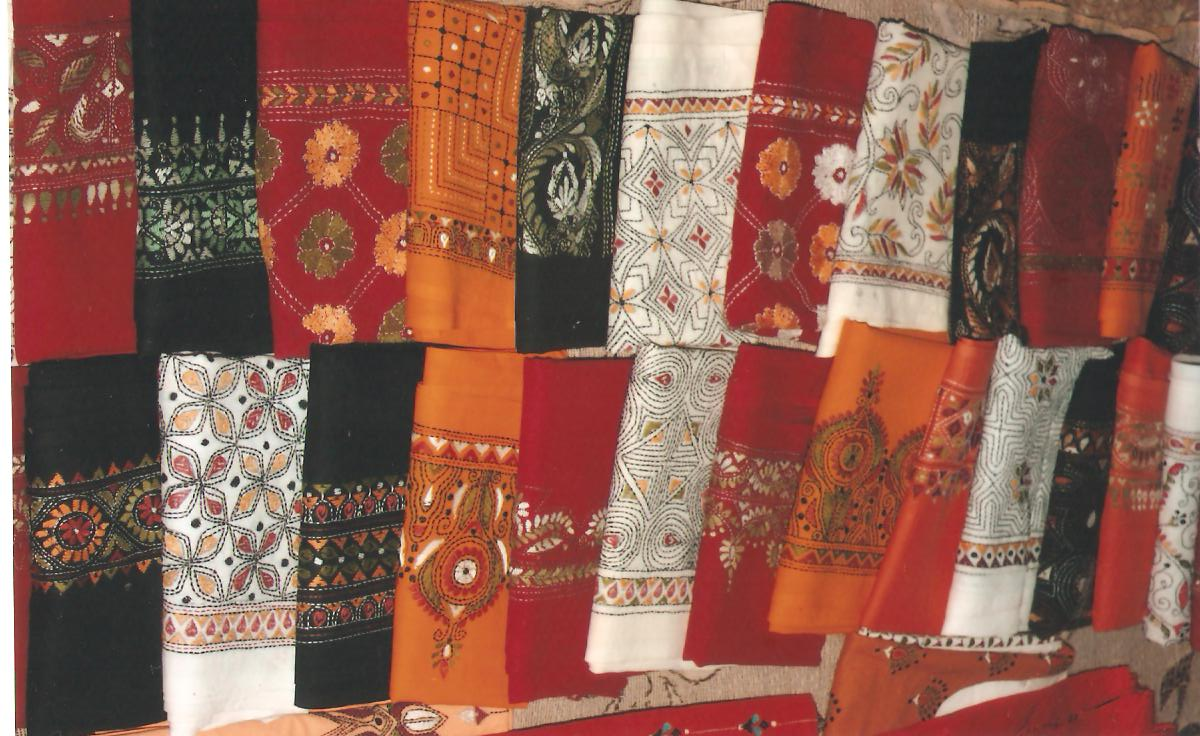
Some Amar Kutir products on display
