= Haludkanali =

- Village
- Location in West Bengal, India Haludkanali (India)
- Coordinates: 22.880694°N 86.878694°E
- Country: India
- State: West Bengal
- District: Bankura

Population (2011)
  - Total: 1,502

Languages*
  - Official: Bengali, Santali, English
- Time zone: UTC+5:30 (IST)
- PIN: 722140
- Telephone/STD code: 03243
- Lok Sabha constituency: Bankura
- Vidhan Sabha constituency: Ranibandh
- Website: bankura.gov.in

Haludkanali (also written as Halud Kanali) is a village and gram panchayat in the Ranibandh CD block in the Khatra subdivision of the Bankura district in the state of West Bengal, India.

== Geography ==
Places in Khatra subdivision in Bankura district
CT: census town, R: rural/ urban centre, C: craft centre, T: ancient/ temple centre
Owing to space constraints in the small map, the actual locations in a larger map may vary slightly

=== Location ===
Haludkanali is located at 22.880694°N 86.878694°E.

=== Area overview ===
The map alongside shows the Khatra subdivision of Bankura district. Physiographically, this area is having uneven lands with hard rocks. In the Khatra CD block area there are some low hills. The Kangsabati project reservoir is prominently visible in the map. The subdued patches of shaded area in the map show forested areas It is an almost fully rural area.

Note: The map alongside presents some of the notable locations in the subdivision. All places marked in the map are linked in the larger full screen map.

== Demographics ==
According to the 2011 Census of India, Halud Kanali had a total population of 1,502, of which 745 (50%) were males and 757 (50%) were females. There were 158 persons in the age range of 0–6 years. The total number of literate persons in Halud Kanali was 0-3 (67.19% of the population over 6 years).

.*For language details see Ranibandh (community development block)#Language and religion

== Education ==
Birsha Munda Memorial College was established at Pirrah, PO Haludkanali, in 2010. Affiliated with the Bankura University, it offers honours courses in Bengali, Santali, history and a general course in arts.

Haludkanali Primary School is a Bengali-medium coeducational institution established in 1980. It has facilities for teaching from class I to class IV.

Dhadkidighi Junior High School is a Bengali-medium coeducational institution established in 2011. It has facilities for teaching from class V to class VIII. The school has a playground.

Natundihi Rashidia Senior Madrasha is a Bengali-medium coeducational institution established in 2003. It has facilities for teaching from class I to class VIII. The madrasha has a library with 200 books and a playground.

There is a higher secondary school name Haludkanali S.C High School(H.S) at Haludkanali.

== Healthcare ==
There is a primary health centre at Haludkanali, with 6 beds.
