= Khoai =

Bengali landform

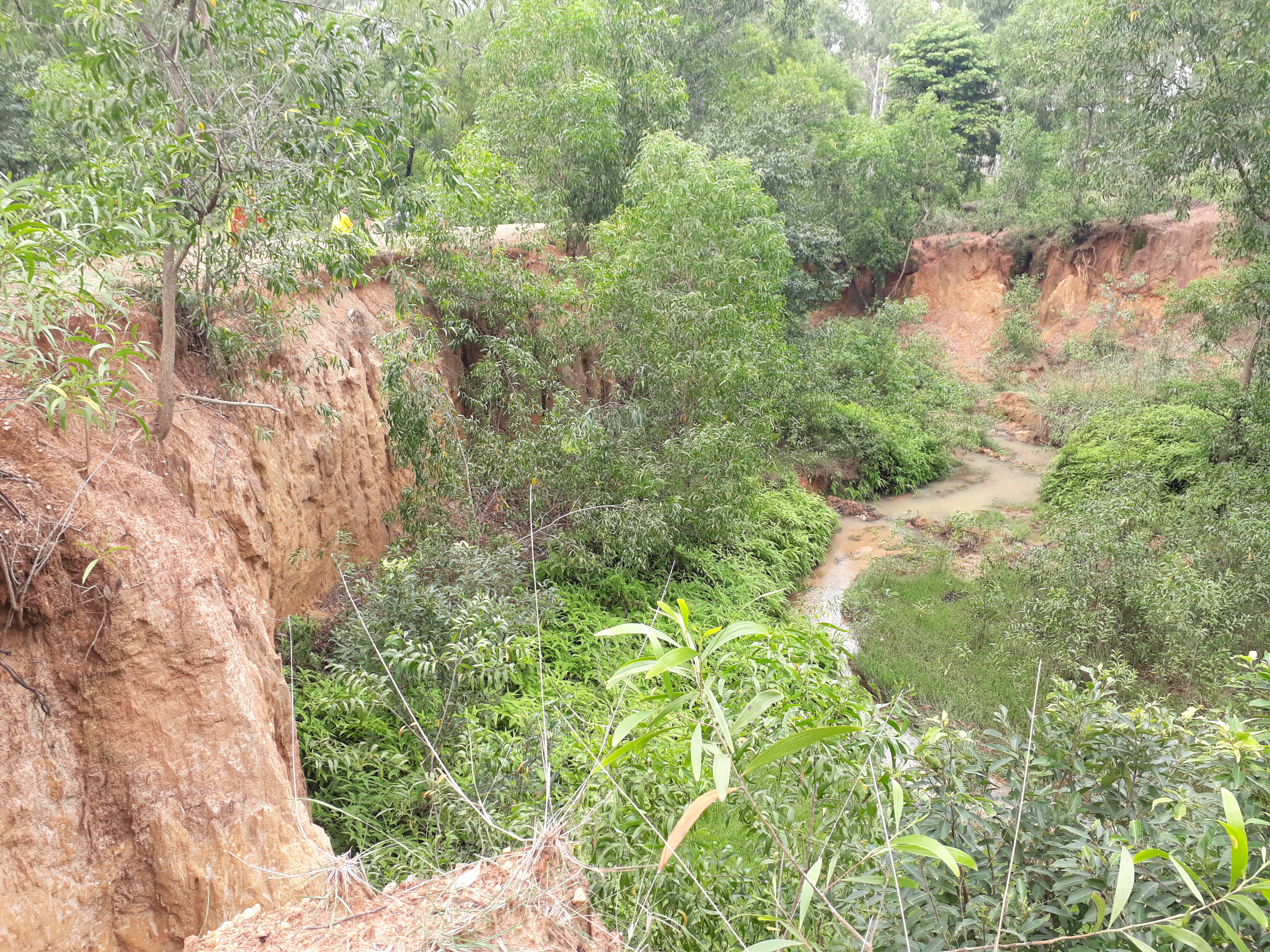
Khoai at Shantiniketan

Khoai in Bengali refers to a geological formation specifically in the Birbhum, Bardhaman, and Bankura districts of West Bengal, India and some parts of Jharkhand, India that is made up of laterite soil rich in iron oxide, often in the shapes of tiny hills. This canyon like terrain is caused by wind and water erosion on red laterite soil. Khoai is part of India's natural heritage.

== History ==
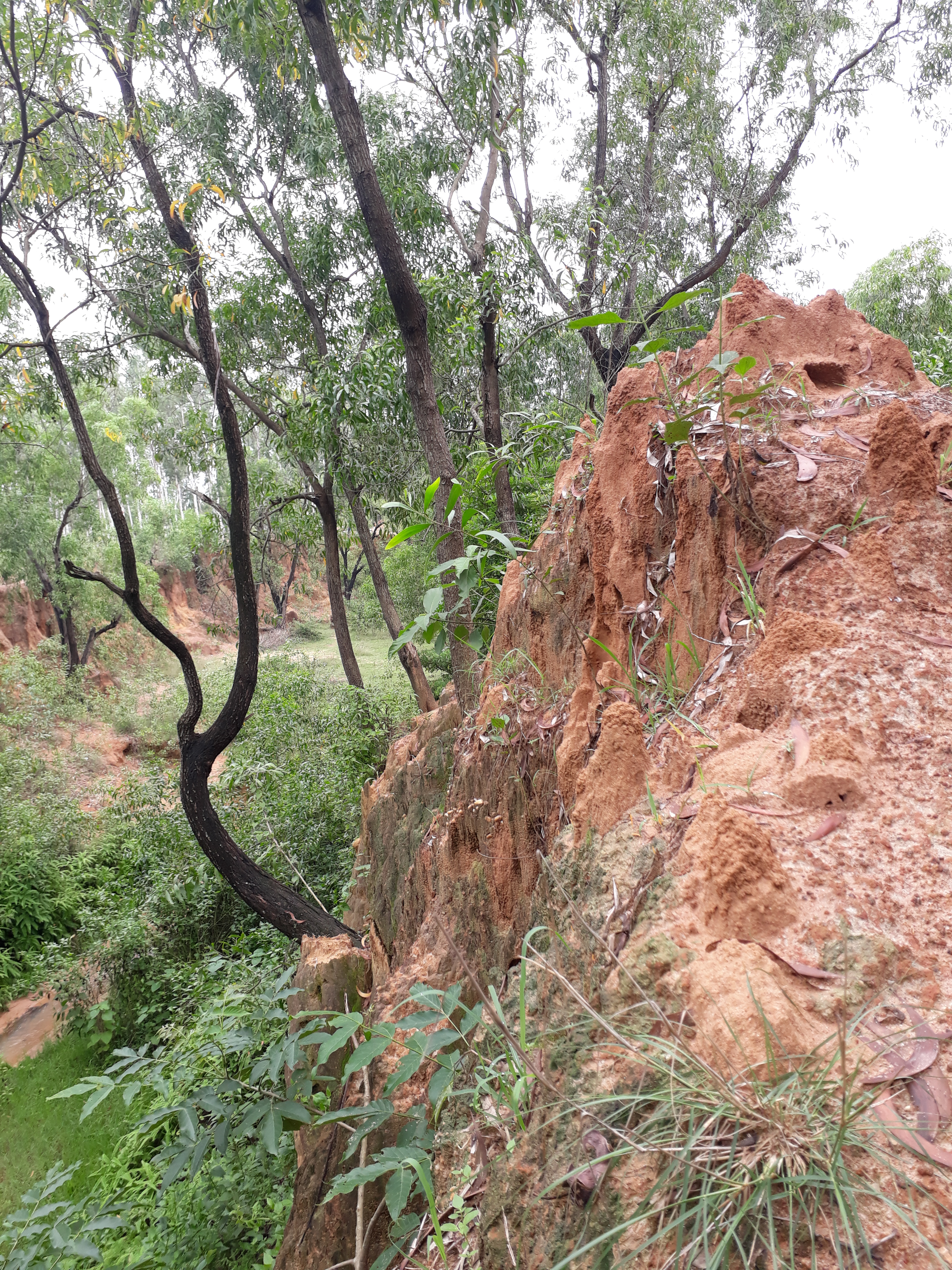
Khoai at Shantiniketan

The Khoai can only support certain types of plants. It is a very poor soil for most types of agriculture practiced in the areas in which it is found. Yet often, a khoai maybe situated adjacent to a naturally forested area. Although a large area in Birbhum is covered by laterite, the areas where the laterite is exposed is termed as Khoai. In some areas the laterite is covered by a layer of ordinary soil and can support normal vegetation. In these areas, there are rice fields or mango groves or different varieties of plantations. These areas are not termed as khoai. In khoai areas there is no vegetation. Except for certain types of trees like Sonajhuri or Acacia, nothing grows on khoai. The beauty of khoai in and around Bolpur, Santiniketan enthralled Rabindranath Tagore and he immortalized khoai in his numerous writings. Famous painters like Nandalal Bose, Ramkinkar and Binodbehari Mukherjee painted khoai in many of their creations and khoai became a part of cultural heritage of Shantiniketan and Visva-Bharati.
