= Jhilimili =

- Village
- Location in West Bengal, India Jhilimili (India)
- Coordinates: 22.8167°N 86.6167°E
- Country: India
- State: West Bengal
- District: Bankura
- Elevation: 228 m (748 ft)

Population (2011)
  - Total: 1,429

Languages*
  - Official: Bengali, Santali, English
- Time zone: UTC+5:30 (IST)
- ISO 3166 code: IN-WB
- Vehicle registration: WB 67,68
- Website: bankura.gov.in

Jhilimili is a tourist centre in the Ranibandh CD block in the Khatra subdivision of the Bankura district in the Indian state of West Bengal.

== Etymology ==
In Bengali, Jhilimili means sparkle or twinkle.

== Geography ==
Places in Khatra subdivision in Bankura district
CT: census town, R: rural/ urban centre, C: craft centre, T: ancient/ temple centre
Owing to space constraints in the small map, the actual locations in a larger map may vary slightly

=== Location ===
Jhilimili is located at 22.8167°N 86.6167°E. It has an average elevation of 228 metres (748 ft). Jhilimili is located on the banks of Kangsabati River, and is about 70 kilometres (43 mi) from Bankura.

=== Area overview ===
The map alongside shows the Khatra subdivision of Bankura district. Physiographically, this area is having uneven lands with hard rocks. In the Khatra CD block area there are some low hills. The Kangsabati project reservoir is prominently visible in the map. The subdued patches of shaded area in the map show forested areas. It is an almost fully rural area.

Note: The map alongside presents some of the notable locations in the subdivision. All places marked in the map are linked in the larger full screen map.

== Demographics ==
According to the 2011 Census of India, Jhilimili had a total population of 1,429 of which 715 (50%) were males and 714 (50%) were females. Population below 6 years was 148. The total number of literates in Jhilimili was 1,046 (81.65% of the population over 6 years).

.*For language details see Ranibandh (community development block)#Language and religion

== Transport ==
State Highway 5 running from Rupnarayanpur (in Bardhaman district) to Junput (in Purba Medinipur district) passes through Jhilimili.

== Education ==
Jhilimili High School is a Bengali-medium coeducational institution established in 1956. It has facilities for teaching from class V to class XII. The school has 6 computers, a library with 2,000 books and a playground.

== Culture ==
During mid-January, Tusu parab is celebrated. Goddess Tusu is worshipped. Santhals organise village fairs during Makara Sankranti. Myths heard for generations says once a King had two daughter Jhili & Mili. Based on their daughter name the location is identified as Jhilimili.
