= Ranibandh Assembly constituency =

Ranibandh
- Constituency No. 249 for the West Bengal Legislative Assembly
- Interactive Map Outlining Ranibandh Assembly Constituency

Constituency details
- Country: India
- Region: East India
- State: West Bengal
- District: Bankura
- Lok Sabha constituency: Bankura
- Established: 1962
- Total electors: 200,735
- Reservation: ST

Member of Legislative Assembly
- 18th West Bengal Legislative Assembly
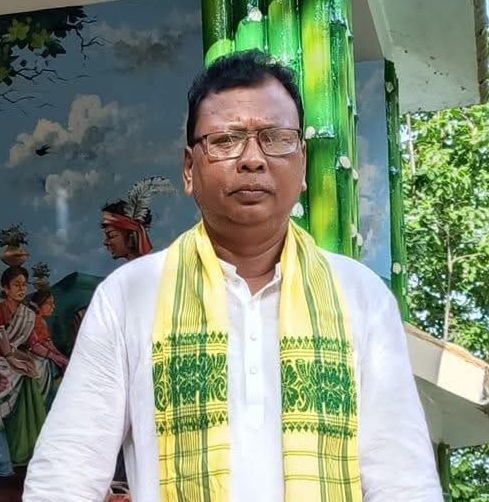
- Incumbent Kshudiram Tudu
- Party: Bharatiya Janata Party
- Elected year: 2026

Ranibandh is an assembly constituency in Bankura district in the Indian state of West Bengal. It is reserved for scheduled tribes.

== Overview ==
As per orders of the Delimitation Commission, No. 249 Ranibandh Assembly constituency (ST) is composed of the following: Ranibandh, Hirbandh and Khatra community development blocks.

Ranibandh Assembly constituency is part of No. 36 Bankura (Lok Sabha constituency).

== Members of the Legislative Assembly ==
Year	Name	Party
1962	Jaleswar Hansda	Communist Party of India
1967	B. Hembran	Indian National Congress
1969	Suchand Saren	Communist Party of India (Marxist)
1971	Suchand Saren	Communist Party of India (Marxist)
1972	Amala Saren	Indian National Congress
1977	Suchand Soren	Communist Party of India (Marxist)
1982	Jaleswar Saren	Independent politician
1987	Rampada Mandi	Communist Party of India (Marxist)
1991	Arati Hembram	Communist Party of India (Marxist)
1996	Deblina Hembram	Communist Party of India (Marxist)
2001	Makar Tudu	Communist Party of India (Marxist)
2006	Deblina Hembram	Communist Party of India (Marxist)
2011	Deblina Hembram	Communist Party of India (Marxist)
2016	Jyotsna Mandi	Trinamool Congress
2021	Jyotsna Mandi	Trinamool Congress
2026	Kshudiram Tudu	Bharatiya Janata Party

== Election results ==
=== 2026 ===
2026 West Bengal Legislative Assembly election: Ranibandh
Party	Candidate	Votes	%	±%
BJP	Kshudiram Tudu	131,145	55.38	▲14.19
AITC	Tanushree Hansda	78,876	33.31	▼9.75
CPI(M)	Deblina Hembram	13,200	5.57	▼3.93
NOTA	None of the above	3,884	1.64	▼0.36
Majority		52,269	22.07	▲20.2
Turnout		236,828	92.8	▲9.45
BJP gain from AITC		Swing		

=== 2021 ===
West Bengal assembly elections,2021: Ranibandh constituency
Party	Candidate	Votes	%	±%
AITC	Jyotsna Mandi	90,928	43.06	
BJP	Kshudiram Tudu	86,989	41.19	
CPI(M)	Deblina Hembram	20,057	9.5	
Independent	Biswanath Sardar	4,807	2.28	
NOTA	None of the above	4,226	2.0	
Majority		3,939	1.87	
Turnout		211,170	83.35	
AITC hold		Swing		

=== 2016 ===
West Bengal assembly elections, 2016: Ranibandh
Party	Candidate	Votes	%	±%
AITC	Jyotsna Mandi	92,181	47.48	▲7.26
CPI(M)	Deblina Hembram	68,868	35.48	▼8.77
BJP	Kshudiram Tudu	18,720	9.64	▲5.86
Turnout		194,129	83.90	▼0.87
AITC gain from CPI(M)		Swing		

=== 2011 ===
2011 West Bengal state assembly election: Ranibandh
Party	Candidate	Votes	%	±%
CPI(M)	Deblina Hembram	75,338	44.25	−1.10
AITC	Falguni Hembram	68,529	40.22	
JHAP	Aditya Kisku	10,950	6.43	
BJP	Lakshmikanta Sardar	6,447	3.78	
Independent	Biswanath Tudu	5,407		
CPI(ML)L	Sudhir Kumar Murmu	2,580		
JVM(P)	Krishnapada Mandi	107		
Turnout		170,373	84.87	
CPI(M) hold		Swing	#	

.# Trinamool Congress did not contest this seat in 2006.

=== 2006 ===
In the 2006 state assembly elections, Deblina Hembram of CPI(M) won the Ranibandh assembly seat defeating her nearest rival Aditya Kisku of Jharkhand Party (Naren). Contests in most years were multi cornered but only winners and runners are being mentioned. Makar Tudu of CPI(M) defeated Gopinath Saren of JMM in 2001. Deblina Hembram of CPI(M) defeated Anil Hansda of Congress in 1996. Arati Hembram of CPI(M) defeated Sudarsan Baskey of Congress in 1991. Rampada Mandi of CPI(M) defeated Chandra Mohan Murmu of Congress in 1987, Jaleswar Saren, Independent, in 1982. Suchand Soren of CPI(M) defeated Jadunath Murmu of Janata Party in 1977.

=== 1972 ===
Amala Saren of Congress won in 1972. Suchand Saren of CPI(M) won in 1971 and 1969. B. Hembran of Congress in 1967. Jaleswar Hansda of CPI won in 1962. Prior to that the Ranibandh seat did not exist.
