= Onda, Bankura =

Onda
- Village
- Location in West Bengal, India Onda (India)
- Coordinates: 23°08′31.2″N 87°12′07.2″E
- Country: India
- State: West Bengal
- District: Bankura

Population (2011)
  - Total: 5,933

Languages
  - Official: Bengali, English
- Time zone: UTC+5:30 (IST)
- PIN: 722144 (Onda)
- Telephone/STD code: 03242
- Lok Sabha constituency: Bishnupur
- Vidhan Sabha constituency: Onda
- Website: bankura.gov.in

Onda is a village in Onda CD block in the Bankura Sadar subdivision of the Bankura district in the state of West Bengal, India.

== Geography ==
Places in Bankura Sadar subdivision in Bankura district
CT: census town, R: rural/ urban centre, H: hill centre, T: temple, B: barrage
Owing to space constraints in the small map, the actual locations in a larger map may vary slightly

=== Location ===
Onda is located at 23°08′31.2″N 87°12′07.2″E.

=== Area overview ===
The map alongside shows the Bankura Sadar subdivision of Bankura district. Physiographically, this area is part of the Bankura Uplands in the west gradually merging with the Bankura-Bishnupur Rarh Plains in the north-east. The western portions are characterised by undulating terrain with many hills and ridges. The area is having a gradual descent from the Chota Nagpur Plateau. The soil is laterite red and hard beds are covered with scrub jungle and sal wood. Gradually it gives way to just uneven rolling lands but the soil continues to be lateritic. There are coal mines in the northern part, along the Damodar River. It is a predominantly rural area with 89% of the population living in rural areas and only 11% living in the urban areas.

Note: The map alongside presents some of the notable locations in the subdivision. All places marked in the map are linked in the larger full screen map.

== Demographics ==
According to the 2011 Census of India, Onda had a total population of 5,933 of which 3,005 (51%) were males and 2,928 (49%) were females. Population below 6 years was 557. The total number of literates in Onda was 4,130 (76.82% of the population over 6 years).

== Civic administration ==
=== CD block HQ ===
The headquarters of Onda CD block are located at Onda.

=== Police station ===
Onda police station has jurisdiction over Onda CD block. The area covered is 499.41 km^{2} and the population covered was 220,572.

== Transport ==
Ondagram railway station is on the Kharagpur-Bankura-Adra line of South Eastern Railway.

National Highway 14, (old numbering NH 60), running from Morgram to Kharagpur, passes through Onda.

== Education ==
Onda High School is a Bengali-medium coeducational institution established in 1942. It has facilities for teaching from class V to class XII. The school has 40 computers, a library with 2,757 books and a playground. This is one of the fourteen schools in Bankura district in which the opening of an Olchiki medium section (for Santali language) from class V was sanctioned in 2012.

Onda Girls High School is a Bengali-medium girls only institution established in 1959. It has facilities for teaching from class V to class X. The school has 15 computers and a library with 1,000 books.

Onda Thana Mahavidyalaya was established in 2007 at Murakata. Affiliated with the Bankura University, it offers honours courses in Bengali, Sanskrit, English and history, and a general course in arts.

== Healthcare ==
Onda Rural Hospital, with 30 beds at PO Medinipurgram, is the major government medical facility in the Onda CD block. There are primary health centres at Ratanpur (with 10 beds), Nakaijuri (Ghorasol) (with 10 beds), Ramsagar (with 10 beds), Santore (Garh Kotalpur) (with 10 beds) and Nikunjapur (with 10 beds).

Onda superspecialty hospital was inaugurated in 2016.

== Notable people ==
- Mohammad Shamsuzzoha (1934–1969) writer, professor and proctor
