= Laugram =

- Village
- Location in West Bengal, India Laugram (India)
- Coordinates: 23.0043°N 87.672611°E
- Country: India
- State: West Bengal
- District: Bankura

Population (2011)
  - Total: 4,469

Languages
  - Official: Bengali, English
- Time zone: UTC+5:30 (IST)
- PIN: 722141
- Telephone/STD code: 03451
- Lok Sabha constituency: Bishnupur
- Vidhan Sabha constituency: Katulpur
- Website: bankura.gov.in

Laugram is a village and a gram panchayat in the Kotulpur CD block in the Bishnupur subdivision of the Bankura district in the state of West Bengal, India.

== History ==
Adi Malla was the founder of the Malla dynasty, that ruled over Mallabhum for around nine centuries, and popular as the Bishnupur Raj. There is a story associated with his beginning. In 695 AD, a prince of one of the royal families of northern India made a pilgrimage with his wife to the Jagannath temple at Puri. He halted in the midst of a great forest at Laugram, 8.4 kilometres (5.2 mi) from Kotulpur. He left his wife who was about to give birth to a child in the care of a Brahmin. The wife gave birth to a son and they remained back in Laugram. When the child was around 7 years old, he started working as a cowherd. The child started showing signs of greatness and was ultimately trained as a warrior. When he was 15 years old he had no equal as a wrestler in the territory all around. It was this that earned him the sobriquet of Adi Malla, the original or unique wrestler. He became a chieftain by the grace of Raja of Padampur, near modern Joypur, 12.8 kilometres (8.0 mi) from Laugram. The Raja made him a grant of Laugram and some villages around it. There are other variants of this story.

== Geography ==
Places in Bishnupur subdivision in Bankura district
M: Municipal town, CT: census town, R: rural/ urban centre, T: ancient/ temple centre
Owing to space constraints in the small map, the actual locations in a larger map may vary slightly

=== Location ===
Laugram is located at 23.0043°N 87.672611°E.

=== Area overview ===
The map alongside shows the Bishnupur subdivision of Bankura district. Physiographically, this area has fertile low lying alluvial plains. It is a predominantly rural area with 90.06% of the population living in rural areas and only 8.94% living in the urban areas. It was a part of the core area of Mallabhum.

Note: The map alongside presents some of the notable locations in the subdivision. All places marked in the map are linked in the larger full screen map.

== Demographics ==
According to the 2011 Census of India, Laugram had a total population of 4,469, of which 2,285 (51%) were males and 2,184 (49%) were females. There were 524 persons in the age range of 0–6 years. The total number of literate persons in Laugram was 2,728 (69.15% of the population over 6 years).

== Education ==
Lowgram Junior High School is a Bengali-medium coeducational institution established in 2008. It has facilities for teaching from class V to class VIII.

== Healthcare ==
Laugram Karakheria primary health centre functions with 10 beds.
