= Kotulpur (community development block) =

- Community development block
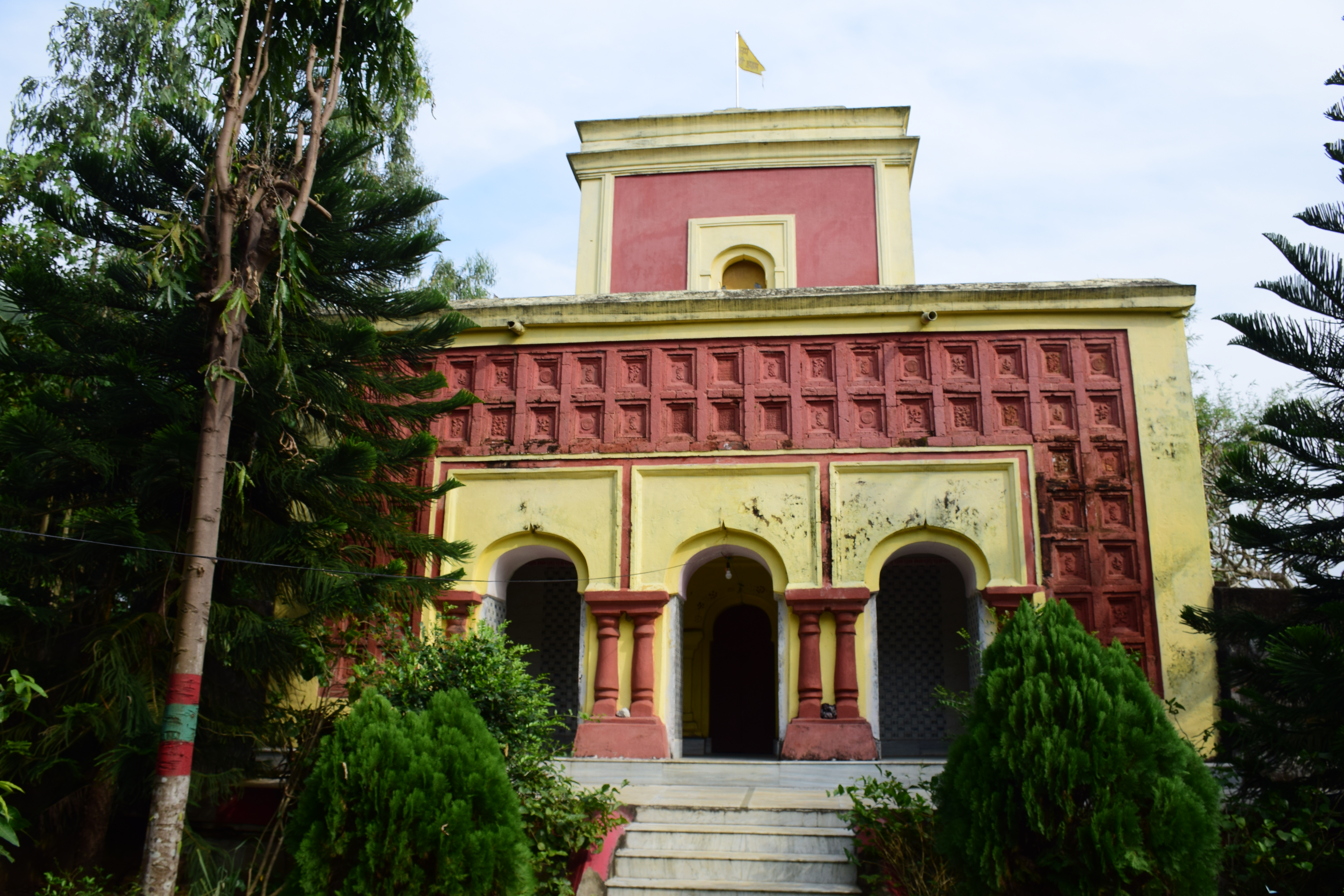
- Krisha Ray Jiu Temple in Bhagalpur village

- Coordinates: 23.0125°N 87.59361°E
- Country: India
- State: West Bengal
- District: Bankura

Government
  - Type: Representative democracy

Area
  - Total: 250.50 km^{2} (96.72 sq mi)
- Elevation: 44 m (144 ft)

Population (2011)
  - Total: 188,775
  - Density: 753.59/km^{2} (1,951.8/sq mi)

Languages
  - Official: Bengali, English
- Time zone: UTC+5:30 (IST)
- PIN: 722141 (Kotalpur); 722161 (Jayrambati)
- Telephone/STD code: 03451
- ISO 3166 code: IN-WB
- Vehicle registration: WB-67, WB-68
- Literacy: 78.01%
- Lok Sabha constituency: Bishnupur
- Vidhan Sabha constituency: Katulpur
- Website: bankura.gov.in

Kotulpur is a community development block (CD block) that forms an administrative division in the Bishnupur subdivision of the Bankura district in the Indian state of West Bengal.

== Etymology ==
The important river in the area is "Amodor" (not Damodar). Its origin is from a fountain at Knuchiakol. This has a great impact on agriculture and thus on local economy. It has gone through almost to the south-east direction. It has some historical importance also. Gar Mandaran (a nearby place, now in Hooghly district and the capital of the then king of this region) is surrounded by this river and in a war Kotlu Khan was defeated in Mughal age because of its geographical location. This Kotulpur is known by the name of this Kotlu Khan.

== History ==
=== From Bishnupur kingdom to the British Raj ===
From around the 7th century AD till around the advent of British rule, for around a millennium, history of Bankura district is identical with the rise and fall of the Hindu Rajas of Bishnupur. The Bishnupur Rajas, who were at the summit of their fortunes towards the end of the 17th century, started declining in the first half of the 18th century. First, the Maharaja of Burdwan seized the Fatehpur Mahal, and then the Maratha invasions laid waste their country.

Bishnupur was ceded to the British with the rest of Burdwan chakla in 1760. In 1787, Bishnupur was united with Birbhum to form a separate administrative unit. In 1793 it was transferred to the Burdwan collectorate. In 1879, the district acquired its present shape with the thanas of Khatra and Raipur and the outpost of Simplapal being transferred from Manbhum, and the thanas of Sonamukhi, Kotulpur and Indas being retransferred from Burdwan. However, it was known for sometime as West Burdwan and in 1881 came to be known as Bankura district.

== Geography ==
Map of Bankura District showing CD blocks and municipalities

Kotulpur is located at 23°00′45″N 87°35′37″E.

Kotulpur CD block is located in the eastern part of the district and belongs to the fertile low lying alluvial plains, similar to the predominating rice lands in the adjacent districts of West Bengal. Here, the eye constantly rests on wide expanses of rice fields, green in the rains but parched and dry in summer.

Kotulpur CD block is bounded by Indas CD block on the north, Goghat II CD block, in Hooghly district, on the east and on the south and Joypur CD block on the west.

Kotulpur CD block has an area of 250.38 km^{2}. It has 1 panchayat samity, 8 gram panchayats, 141 gram sansads (village councils), 170 mouzas and 165 inhabited villages. Kotulpur police station serves this block. Headquarters of this CD block is at Kotulpur.

Gram panchayats of Kotulpur block/ panchayat samiti are: Deshra Koalpara, Gopinathpur, Kotulpur, Lego g.p., Lowgram, Madanmohanpur, Mirzapur and Sihar.

=== Places of interest ===
- Joyrambati - famous for Sarada Devi, wife of Sri Ramakrishna.
- Sri Sri Laxminarayan Jew Mandir, Harihar Jew Mondir, Sri Ganesh Jew Mandir, Sri Bhoirab Thakur Jew Mandir : these mandirs were constructed around 1907 by Late Kshetramonhan Rakshit by registered Arpannama. Now they are over 100 years old. Every year they celebrate Jhulan Jatra with 3 days functions. Local people participate in these celebrations. These mandirs are situated in Rakshit Para in Kotalpur.
- Koalpara - tourists visit the place for another house of Sarada Devi. Here she used to encourage Swadeshi movement against the British rulers.
- Sihar - There is a pancharatna temple of Sri Sri Raghunath of Dr Gunamoy Mukherjee's family of 267 yrs old and Sri Sri Durga Mandir of 150 years old, Sri Sri Santinath temple (temple's art is of Jain age), Sri Sri Ratanti Kalika temple (Sri Sivananda Saraswati, Sri Shyamananda Saraswati) and Sri Sarada Math have made the village a place of interest.
- Kotulpur - Kotulpur Sridhar Temple

== Demographics ==
=== Population ===
According to the 2011 Census of India, Kotulpur CD block had a total population of 188,775, of which 180,292 were rural and 8,483 were urban. There were 96,394 (51%) males and 92,381 (49%) females. Population in the age range of 0 to 6 years was 20,430. Scheduled Castes numbered 66,780 (35.38%) and Scheduled Tribes numbered 6,211 (3.29%).

According to the 2001 census, Kotulpur block had a total population of 167,543, out of which 86,288 were males and 81,255 were females. Kotulpur block registered a population growth of 15.92 per cent during the 1991-2001 decade. Decadal growth for the district was 15.15 per cent. Decadal growth in West Bengal was 17.84 per cent.

Census Towns in Kotulpur CD block are (2011 census figures in brackets): Kotulpur (8,483).

Large villages (with 4,000+ population) in Kotulpur CD block are (2011 census figures in brackets): Mirzapur (4,658), Madanmohanpur (4,181), Lego (4,978), Balitha (4,760), Laugram (4,469), Shiromanipur (5,479), Kunarpur (4,403), Gopinathpur (4,357) and Deshra (7,671).

Other villages in Kotulpur CD block are (2011 census figures in brackets): Sihar (2,164), Koalpara (2,305) and Joyrambati (862).

=== Literacy ===
According to the 2011 census, the total number of literates in Kotulpur CD block was 131,327 (78.01% of the population over 6 years) out of which males numbered 73,133 (85.00% of the male population over 6 years) and females numbered 58,194 (70.70%) of the female population over 6 years). The gender disparity (the difference between female and male literacy rates) was 14.30%.

See also – List of West Bengal districts ranked by literacy rate

Literacy in CD blocks of
Bankura district
Bankura Sadar subdivision
Saltora – 61.45%
Mejia – 66.83%
Gangajalghati – 68.11%
Chhatna – 65.73%
Bankura I – 68.74%
Bankura II – 73.59%
Barjora – 71.67%
Onda – 65.82%
Bishnupur subdivision
Indas – 71.70%
Joypur – 74.57%
Patrasayer – 64.8%
Kotulpur – 78.01%
Sonamukhi – 66.16%
Bishnupur – 66.30%
Khatra subdivision
Indpur – 67.42%
Ranibandh – 68.53%
Khatra – 72.18%
Hirbandh – 64.18%
Raipur – 71.33%
Sarenga – 74.25%
Simlapal – 68.44%
Taldangra – 70.87%
2011 Census: CD Block Wise

Primary Census Abstract Data

=== Language and religion ===
Religion in Kotulpur CD block (2011)
Hinduism	82.32%
Islam	17.44%
Other or not stated	0.24%

In the 2011 census Hindus numbered 155,396 and formed 82.32% of the population in Kotulpur CD block. Muslims numbered 32,922 and formed 17.44% of the population. Christians numbered 38 and formed 0.02% of the population. Others numbered 457 and formed 0.24% of the population. Others include Addi Bassi, Marang Boro, Santal, Saranath, Sari Dharma, Sarna, Alchchi, Bidin, Sant, Saevdharm, Seran, Saran, Sarin, Kheria, and other religious communities. In 2001, Hindus were 82.95% and Muslims 16.39% of the population respectively.

Languages of Kotulpur CD block (2011)
1. Bengali (98.0%)
2. Santali (1.81%)
3. Others (0.18%)

At the time of the 2011 census, 98.01% of the population spoke Bengali and 1.81% Santali as their first language.

== Rural poverty ==
In Kotulpur CD block 29.30% families were living below poverty line in 2007. According to the Rural Household Survey in 2005, 28.87% of the total number of families were BPL families in the Bankura district.

== Economy ==
=== Livelihood ===
Livelihood
in Kotulpur CD block
1. Cultivators (30.6%)
2. Agricultural labourers (39.0%)
3. Household industries (4.28%)
4. Other Workers (26.1%)

In the Kotulpur CD block in 2011, among the class of total workers, cultivators numbered 23,737 and formed 30.61%, agricultural labourers numbered 30,249 and formed 39.00%, household industry workers numbered 3,318 and formed 4.28% and other workers numbered 20,255 and formed 26.12%. Total workers numbered 77,559 and formed 41.09% of the total population, and non-workers numbered 111,216 and formed 58.91% of the population.

Note: In the census records a person is considered a cultivator, if the person is engaged in cultivation/ supervision of land owned by self/government/institution. When a person who works on another person's land for wages in cash or kind or share, is regarded as an agricultural labourer. Household industry is defined as an industry conducted by one or more members of the family within the household or village, and one that does not qualify for registration as a factory under the Factories Act. Other workers are persons engaged in some economic activity other than cultivators, agricultural labourers and household workers. It includes factory, mining, plantation, transport and office workers, those engaged in business and commerce, teachers, entertainment artistes and so on.

=== Infrastructure ===
There are 165 inhabited villages in the Kotulpur CD block, as per the District Census Handbook, Bankura, 2011. 100% villages have power supply. 100% villages have drinking water supply. 25 villages (15.15%) have post offices. 165 villages (100%) have telephones (including landlines, public call offices and mobile phones). 43 villages (26.06%) have pucca (paved) approach roads and 66 villages (40.00%) have transport communication (includes bus service, rail facility and navigable waterways). 23 villages (13.94%) have agricultural credit societies and 4 villages (2.42%) have banks.

=== Agriculture ===
There were 156 fertiliser depots, 47 seed stores and 51 fair price shops in the CD block.

In 2013–2014, persons engaged in agriculture in Kotulpur CD block could be classified as follows: bargadars 12.15%, patta (document) holders 13.18%, small farmers (possessing land between 1 and 2 hectares) 8.26%, marginal farmers (possessing land up to 1 hectare) 3.19% and agricultural labourers 63.21%.

In 2003-2004 net area sown Kotulpur CD block was 17,741 hectares and the area in which more than one crop was grown was 12,446 hectares.

In 2013–2014, the total area irrigated in Kotulpur CD block was 19,987 hectares, out of which 13,192 hectares was by canal water, 1,612 hectares by tank water, 820 hectares by river lift irrigation, 702 hectares by deep tube well and 3,661 hectares by shallow tubewell.

In 2013–2014, Kotulpur CD block produced 108,046 tonnes of Aman paddy, the main winter crop, from 37,750 hectares, 16,917 tonnes of Aus paddy from 6,424 hectares, 18,746 tonnes of Boro paddy from 5,147 hectares, 244 tonnes of wheat from 104 hectares and 28,196,000 tonnes of potatoes from 4,633 hectares. It also produced pulses and mustard.

=== Handloom and pottery industries ===
The handloom industry engages the largest number of persons in the non farm sector and hence is important in Bankura district. The handloom industry is well established in all the CD blocks of the district and includes the famous Baluchari saris. In 2004-05 Kotulpur CD block had 508 looms in operation.

Bankura district is famous for the artistic excellence of its pottery products that include the famous Bankura horse. The range of pottery products is categorised as follows: domestic utilities, terracota and other decorative items and roofing tiles and other heavy pottery items. Around 3,200 families were involved in pottery making in the district in 2002. 137 families were involved in Kotulpur CD block.

=== Banking ===
In 2013–14, Kotulpur CD block had offices of 9 commercial banks and 3 gramin banks.

=== Backward Regions Grant Fund ===
The Bankura district is listed as a backward region and receives financial support from the Backward Regions Grant Fund. The fund, created by the Government of India, is designed to redress regional imbalances in development. As of 2012, 272 districts across the country were listed under this scheme. The list includes 11 districts of West Bengal.

== Transport ==
In 2013–14, Kotulpur CD block had 4 ferry services and 11 originating/ terminating bus routes.

State Highway 2 (West Bengal) running from Bankura to Malancha (in North 24 Parganas district) passes through this CD Block.

== Education ==
In 2013–14, Kotulpur CD block had 161 primary schools with 15,328 students, 25 middle schools with 3,999 students, 13 high schools with 5,821 students and 13 higher secondary schools with 11,574 students. Kotulpur CD block had 3 professional/ technical institutions with 3,333 students and 296 institutions for special and non-formal education with 9,944 students.

See also – Education in India

According to the 2011 census, in the Kotulpur CD block, among the 165 inhabited villages, 29 villages did not have a school, 48 villages had two or more primary schools, 50 villages had at least 1 primary and 1 middle school and 22 villages had at least 1 middle and 1 secondary school.

Chatra Ramai Pandit Mahavidyalaya, located at Chatra, PO Darapur, was established in 2001.

== Healthcare ==
In 2014, Kotulpur CD block had 1 rural hospital, 6 primary health centres and 2 private nursing homes with total 130 beds and 9 doctors. It had 31 family welfare sub centres and 1 family welfare centre. 8,380 patients were treated indoor and 210,085 patients were treated outdoor in the hospitals, health centres and subcentres of the CD block.

Kotulpur Rural Hospital, with 60 beds at Kotulpur, is the major government medical facility in the Kotulpur CD block. There are primary health centres at Gopinathpur (with 6 beds), Lego (with 10 beds), Laugram Karakheria (with 10 beds), Sihar (with 10 beds), Mirjapur (with 4 beds) and Deshra (Deopara) (with 10 beds).
