= Chatra, Bankura =

Chatra
- Village
- Location in West Bengal, India Chatra (India)
- Coordinates: 23.02001°N 87.51534°E
- Country: India
- State: West Bengal
- District: Bankura

Population (2011)
  - Total: 2,995

Languages
  - Official: Bengali, English
- Time zone: UTC+5:30 (IST)
- PIN: 722141
- Telephone/STD code: 03244
- Lok Sabha constituency: Bishnupur
- Vidhan Sabha constituency: Katulpur
- Website: bankura.gov.in

Chatra (also referred to as Chatra Krishnanagar, as it is in Krishnangar mouza) is a village in the Kotulpur CD block in the Bishnupur subdivision of the Bankura district in the state of West Bengal, India.

== Geography ==
Places in Bishnupur subdivision in Bankura district
M: Municipal town, CT: census town, R: rural/ urban centre, T: ancient/ temple centre
Owing to space constraints in the small map, the actual locations in a larger map may vary slightly

=== Location ===
Chatra is located at 23.02001°N 87.51534°E.

=== Area overview ===
The map alongside shows the Bishnupur subdivision of Bankura district. Physiographically, this area has fertile low lying alluvial plains. It is a predominantly rural area with 90.06% of the population living in rural areas and only 8.94% living in the urban areas. It was a part of the core area of Mallabhum.

Note: The map alongside presents some of the notable locations in the subdivision. All places marked in the map are linked in the larger full screen map.

== Demographics ==
According to the 2011 Census of India, Chatra Krishnangar had a total population of 2,995, of which 1,476 (50%) were males and 1,479 (50%) were females. There were 339 persons in the age range of 0–6 years. The total number of literate persons in Chatra Krishnanagar was 1,586 (60.63% of the population over 6 years).

== Education ==
Chatra Ramai Pandit Mahavidyalaya, was established at Chatra, PO Darapur in 2000. Affiliated with Bankura University, it offers honours courses in Bengali, Sanskrit, English, history, geography, political science, philosophy and education, and a general course in arts. The institution is named after the medieval poet and scholar Ramai Pandit.

Chatra Junior High School is a Bengali-medium coeducational institution established in 2009. It has facilities for teaching from class V to class VIII.

Ashurali Jyotish Chandra High School is a Bengali-medium coeducational institution established in 1964. It has facilities for teaching from class V to class XII. The school has 3 computers and a library with 2,700 books.

== Healthcare ==
Kotulpur Rural Hospital, with 60 beds at Kotulpur, is the major government medical facility in the Kotulpur CD block.
