= Midnapore (disambiguation) =

Midnapore or Medinipur is a city in West Bengal, India.

It may also refer to:

== Places ==
- Midnapore District, former district of West Bengal, India, split during the Partition of Midnapore
  - Purba Medinipur district [short. Midnapore (E)], in West Bengal, India
  - Paschim Medinipur district [short. Midnapore (W)], in West Bengal, India
- Medinipur Sadar subdivision, in West Bengal, India
- Midnapore Sadar (community development block), in West Bengal, India
- Medinipur, Bankura, a village in Bankura district, West Bengal, India
- Midnapore, Alberta, former community in Alberta, Canada, now a neighbourhood in Calgary, Alberta, Canada

== Other ==
- Midnapore College, a college in Midnapore, West Bengal, India
- Midnapore Collegiate School, a school in Bengal, India
- Medinipur (Lok Sabha constituency), in West Bengal, India
- Medinipur (Vidhan Sabha constituency), in West Bengal, India
- Calgary Midnapore, a Canadian parliament constituency in Alberta, Canada
