= Sonamukhi Assembly constituency =

SONAMUKHI
- Constituency No. 258 for the West Bengal Legislative Assembly
- Interactive Map Outlining Sonamukhi Assembly Constituency

Constituency details
- Country: India
- Region: East India
- State: West Bengal
- District: Bankura
- Lok Sabha constituency: Bishnupur
- Established: 1951
- Total electors: 180,316
- Reservation: SC

Member of Legislative Assembly
- 18th West Bengal Legislative Assembly
- Incumbent Dibakar Gharami
- Party: BJP
- Alliance: NDA
- Elected year: 2026

Sonamukhi Assembly constituency is an assembly constituency in Bankura district in the Indian state of West Bengal. It is reserved for scheduled castes.

== Overview ==
As per orders of the Delimitation Commission, No. 258 Sonamukhi Assembly constituency (SC) is composed of the following: Sonamukhi municipality; Sonamukhi community development block; and Belut Rasulpur, Beersingha, Hamirpur, Narayanpur and Patrasayar gram panchayats of Patrasayer community development block.

Sonamukhi Assembly constituency is part of No. 37 Bishnupur (Lok Sabha constituency).

== Members of the Legislative Assembly ==
Year	Members	Party
1952	Sishuram Mandal	Indian National Congress
1952	Bhabataran Chakrabarty	Indian National Congress
1957	No Seat Exist	Casual vacancy
1962	No Seat Exist	Casual vacancy
1967	K Saha	Indian National Congress
1969	Sukhendu Khan	Communist Party of India (Marxist)
1971	Sukhendu Khan	Communist Party of India (Marxist)
1972	Gurupada Khan	Indian National Congress
1977	Sukhendu Khan	Communist Party of India
1982	Sukhendu Khan	Communist Party of India
1987	Sukhendu Khan	Communist Party of India
1991	Haradhan Bauri	Communist Party of India
1996	Haradhan Bauri	Communist Party of India
2001	Sukhendu Khan	Communist Party of India
2006	Niresh Bagdi	Communist Party of India
2011	Dipali Saha	Trinamool Congress
2016	Ajit Ray	Communist Party of India (Marxist)
2021	Dibakar Gharami	Bharatiya Janata Party
2026	Dibakar Gharami	Bharatiya Janata Party

== Election results ==
=== 2026 ===
2026 West Bengal Legislative Assembly election: Sonamukhi
Party	Candidate	Votes	%	±%
BJP	Dibakar Gharami	115,549	52.08	+4.83
AITC	Kallol Saha	86,139	38.83	−3.18
CPI(M)	Ajit Ray	10,537	4.75	−2.82
Independent	Sujoy Sarkar	2,302	1.04	
NOTA	None of the above	2,061	0.93	−0.07
Majority		29,410	13.25	+8.01
Turnout		221,852	93.89	+4.75
BJP hold		Swing		

=== 2021 ===
West Bengal assembly elections, 2021: Sonamukhi
Party	Candidate	Votes	%	±%
BJP	Dibakar Gharami	98,161	47.25	▲39.17
AITC	Shyamal Santra	87,273	42.01	▲0.62
CPI(M)	Ajit Ray	15,725	7.57	▼38.48
SUCI(C)	Avranil Mondal	2,772	1.33	
NOTA	None of the above	2,076	1.0	
Majority		10,888	5.24	
Turnout		207,739	89.14	
BJP gain from CPI(M)		Swing		

=== 2016 ===
2016 West Bengal Legislative Assembly election: Sonamukhi
Party	Candidate	Votes	%	±%
CPI(M)	Ajit Ray	86,125	46.05	▲0.67
AITC	Dipali Saha	77,406	41.39	▼8.41
BJP	Debjani Roy	15,118	8.08	▲3.46
NOTA	None of the above	4,811	2.57	New
Majority		8,719	4.66	▲0.24
Turnout		1,87,035	88.99	▼2.55
CPI(M) gain from AITC		Swing		

=== 2011 ===
West Bengal assembly elections, 2011: Sonamukhi
Party	Candidate	Votes	%	±%
AITC	Dipali Saha	82,199	49.80	▲11.34
CPI(M)	Monoranjan Chongre	74,910	45.38	▼11.01
BJP	Madhab Bagdi	7,961	4.82	
Majority		7,289	4.42	
Turnout		1,65,070	91.54	
AITC gain from CPI(M)		Swing	22.35	

.# Swing calculated on Congress+Trinamool Congress vote percentages taken together in 2006.

=== 2006 ===
In the 2006 state assembly elections, Niresh Bagdi of CPI(M) won the Sonamukhi assembly seat defeating his nearest rival Dipali Saha of Trinamool Congress. Contests in most years were multi cornered but only winners and runners are being mentioned. Sukhendu Khan of CPI(M) defeated Dipali Saha of Trinamool Congress in 2001. Haradhan Bauri of CPI(M) defeated Pulakesh Saha of Congress in 1996 and Sastidhar Bagdi of Congress in 1991. Sukhendu Khan of CPI(M) defeated Kallol Saha of Congress in 1987, Sasthi Bauri of Congress in 1982 and Kanai Saha of Janata Party in 1977.

=== 1972 ===
Gurupada Khan of Congress won in 1972. Sukhendu Khan of CPI(M) won in 1971 and 1969. K.Saha of Congress won in 1967. The Sonamukhi seat was not there in 1962 and 1957. In independent India's first election in 1952, the Sonamukhi dual seat was won by Shishuram Mandal and Bhabataran Chakrabarty, both of Congress.
