= Medinipur, Bankura =

Medinipur Medinipurgram
- Village
- Location in West Bengal, India Medinipur (India)
- Coordinates: 23.1063°N 87.1848°E
- Country: India
- State: West Bengal
- District: Bankura

Population (2011)
  - Total: 1,444

Languages
  - Official: Bengali, English
- Time zone: UTC+5:30 (IST)
- PIN: 722144
- Telephone/STD code: 03244
- Lok Sabha constituency: Bishnupur
- Vidhan Sabha constituency: Onda
- Website: bankura.gov.in

Medinipur (also referred to as Medinipurgram) is a village in the Onda CD block in the Bankura Sadar subdivision of the Bankura district in the state of West Bengal, India.

== Geography ==
Places in Bankura Sadar subdivision in Bankura district
M: municipal town/ city, CT: census town, R: rural/ urban centre, H: hill centre, T: temple, B: barrage
Owing to space constraints in the small map, the actual locations in a larger map may vary slightly

=== Location ===
Medinipur is located at 23.1063°N 87.1848°E.

=== Area overview ===
The map alongside shows the Bankura Sadar subdivision of Bankura district. Physiographically, this area is part of the Bankura Uplands in the west gradually merging with the Bankura-Bishnupur Rarh Plains in the north-east. The western portions are characterised by undulating terrain with many hills and ridges. The area is having a gradual descent from the Chota Nagpur Plateau. The soil is laterite red and hard beds are covered with scrub jungle and sal wood. Gradually it gives way to just uneven rolling lands but the soil continues to be lateritic. There are coal mines in the northern part, along the Damodar River. It is a predominantly rural area with 89% of the population living in rural areas and only 11% living in the urban areas.

Note: The map alongside presents some of the notable locations in the subdivision. All places marked in the map are linked in the larger full screen map.

== Demographics ==
According to the 2011 Census of India, Medinipur had a total population of 2,662, of which 1,368 (51%) were males and 1,294 (49%) were females. There were 151 persons in the age range of 0–6 years. The total number of literate persons in Medinipur was 1,500 (63.69% of the population over 6 years).

== Education ==
Krishnanagar J.K. High School is a Bengali-medium coeducational institution established in 1966. It has facilities for teaching from class V to class XII. The school has 1 computer, a library with 160 books and a playground.

Medinipur Junior Girls High School is a Bengali-medium girls only institution established in 2008. It has facilities for teaching from class V to class VIII.

Onda Thana Mahavidyalaya was established in 2007 at Murakata. Affiliated with the Bankura University, it offers honours courses in Bengali, Sanskrit, English and history, and a general course in arts.

== Healthcare ==
Onda Rural Hospital, with 30 beds is the major government medical facility in the Onda CD block. There are primary health centres at Ratanpur (with 10 beds), Nakaijuri (Ghorasol) (with 10 beds), Ramsagar (with 10 beds), Santore (Garh Kotalpur) (with 10 beds) and Nikunjapur (with 10 beds).
