= Kotulpur =

- village
- Kotulpur Police Station

- Location in West Bengal, India 23°00'45.0"N 87°35'37.0"E Kotulpur (India)
- Coordinates: 23°00′45.0″N 87°35′37.0″E
- Country: India
- State: West Bengal
- District: Bankura

Area
  - Total: 5.6454 km^{2} (2.1797 sq mi)

Population (2011)
  - Total: 8,483
  - Density: 1,503/km^{2} (3,892/sq mi)

Languages
  - Official: Bengali, English
- Time zone: UTC+5:30 (IST)
- PIN: 722141 (Kotulpur)
- Telephone/STD code: 03451
- Lok Sabha constituency: Bishnupur
- Vidhan Sabha constituency: Katulpur
- Website: bankura.gov.in

Kotulpur is a village in the Kotulpur CD block in the Bishnupur subdivision of the Bankura district in the state of West Bengal, India.

== Etymology ==
Kotlu Khan of Gar Mandaran, then capital of the local kingdom, was killed in a war in the Mughal era. Kotulpur was named after him.

== Geography ==
Places in Bishnupur subdivision in Bankura district
M: Municipal town, CT: census town, R: rural/ urban centre, T: ancient/ temple centre
Owing to space constraints in the small map, the actual locations in a larger map may vary slightly

=== Location ===
Kotulpur is located at 23°00′45.0″N 87°35′37.0″E

=== Area overview ===
The map alongside shows the Bishnupur subdivision of Bankura district. Physiographically, this area has fertile low lying alluvial plains. It is a predominantly rural area with 90.06% of the population living in rural areas and only 8.94% living in the urban areas. It was a part of the core area of Mallabhum.

Note: The map alongside presents some of the notable locations in the subdivision. All places marked in the map are linked in the larger full screen map.

== Demographics ==
According to 2011 Census of India, Kotulpur had a total population of 8,483, of which 4,280 (50%) were males and 4,203 (50%) were females. Population below 6 years was 759. The total number of literates in Kotulpur was 6,653 (86.13% of the population over 6 years).

== Civic administration ==
=== Police station ===
Kotulpur police station, founded in 1907 has jurisdiction over Kotulpur CD block. The area covered is 250.50 km^{2} with a population of 167,547.

=== CD block HQ ===
The headquarters of Kotulpur CD block are located at Kotulpur.

== Infrastructure ==
According to the District Census Handbook 2011, Bankura, Kotulpur covered an area of 5.6454 km^{2}. Among the civic amenities, the protected water supply involved tap water from un-treated sources, hand pumps. It had 790 domestic electric connections. Among the medical facilities it had 1 hospital, 11 medicine shops. Among the educational facilities it had were 7 primary schools, 2 middle schools, 2 secondary schools, 2 senior secondary schools, the nearest general degree college at Chatra 13 km away.

== Transport ==
State Highway 2 running from Khatra to Malancha (in North 24 Parganas district) passes through Kotulpur. A well connected bus services available from Kotulpur. Various long-distance bus routes like Tarakeswar - Bankura, Tarakeswar - Khatra, Arambagh - Purulia, Kolkata - Bishnupur, Chuchura - Bankura, Kotulpur - Durgapur, Kotulpur - Namkhana etc. present now, beside this local busses available for Jairambati, Indas, Arambagh, Kamarpukur, Bishnupur, Badanganj etc.

== Education ==
Kotulpur High School

- Kotulpur High School is a Bengali-medium coeducational institution established in 1891. It has facilities for teaching from class V to class XII. The school has 12 computers, a library with 1,000 books and a playground.
- Kotulpur Sarojbasini Balika Vidyalaya is a Bengali-medium coeducational institution established in 1965. It has facilities for teaching from class V to class XII. The school has 5 computers, a library with 2,350 books and a playground.
- Chatra Ramai Pandit Mahavidyalaya, was established at Chatra, PO Darapur in 2000.

== Healthcare ==
Kotulpur Rural Hospital, with 60 beds at Kotulpur, is the major government medical facility in the Kotulpur CD block. There are primary health centres at Gopinathpur (with 6 beds), Lego (with 10 beds), Laugram Karakheria (with 10 beds), Sihar (with 10 beds), Mirjapur (with 4 beds) and Deshra (Deopara) (with 10 beds). also a multi-speciality hospital is located inside this town.
