= Onda (community development block) =

- Community development block
- Coordinates: 23.13°N 87.20°E
- Country: India
- State: West Bengal
- District: Bankura

Government
  - Type: Representative democracy

Area
  - Total: 502.46 km^{2} (194.00 sq mi)
- Elevation: 74 m (243 ft)

Population (2011)
  - Total: 252,984
  - Density: 503.49/km^{2} (1,304.0/sq mi)

Languages
  - Official: Bengali, English
- Time zone: UTC+5:30 (IST)
- PIN: 722144 (Onda)
- Telephone/STD code: 03244
- ISO 3166 code: IN-WB
- Vehicle registration: WB-67, WB-68
- Literacy: 65.82%
- Lok Sabha constituency: Bishnupur
- Vidhan Sabha constituency: Onda
- Website: bankura.gov.in

Onda is a community development block (CD block) that forms an administrative division in the Bankura Sadar subdivision of the Bankura district in the Indian state of West Bengal.

== History ==
=== From Bishnupur kingdom to the British Raj ===
From around 7th century AD till around the advent of British rule, for around a millennium, history of Bankura district is identical with the rise and fall of the Hindu Rajas of Bishnupur. The Bishnupur Rajas, who were at the summit of their fortunes towards the end of the 17th century, started declining in the first half of the 18th century. First, the Maharaja of Burdwan seized the Fatehpur Mahal, and then the Maratha invasions laid waste their country.

Bishnupur was ceded to the British with the rest of Burdwan chakla in 1760. In 1787, Bishnupur was united with Birbhum to form a separate administrative unit. In 1793 it was transferred to the Burdwan collectorate. In 1879, the district acquired its present shape with the thanas of Khatra and Raipur and the outpost of Simplapal being transferred from Manbhum, and the thanas of Sonamukhi, Kotulpur and Indas being retransferred from Burdwan. However, it was known for sometime as West Burdwan and in 1881 came to be known as Bankura district.

== Geography ==
Map of Bankura District showing CD blocks and municipalities

Onda is located at 23°08′N 87°12′E.

Onda CD block is located in the central part of the district. It belongs to the uneven lands/ hard ring rock area. The soil is laterite red and hard beds are covered with scrub jungle and sal wood.

Onda CD block is bounded by Bankura II CD block on the north, Bishnupur CD block on the east, Taldangra CD block on the south and Indpur and Bankura I CD blocks on the west.

Onda CD block has an area of 502.46 km^{2}. It has 1 panchayat samity, 15 gram panchayats, 185 gram sansads (village councils), 291 mouzas and 271 inhabited villages. Onda police station serves this block. Headquarters of this CD block is at Onda.

Gram panchayats of Onda block/ panchayat samiti are: Chingani, Churamanipur, Kalyani, Kantaberia, Lodna, Majdiha, Medinipur, Nakaijuri, Nikunjapur, Onda I, Onda II, Punisole, Ramsagar, Ratanpur and Santore.

== Demographics ==
=== Population ===
According to the 2011 Census of India, Onda CD block had a total population of 252,984, all of which were rural. There were 129,248 (51%) males and 123,736 (49%) females. Population in the age range of 0 to 6 years was 33,274. Scheduled Castes numbered 83,933 (33.18%) and Scheduled Tribes numbered 12,443 (4.92%).

According to the 2001 census, Onda block had a total population of 219,845, out of which 112,429 were males and 107,416 were females. Onda block registered a population growth of 15.06 per cent during the 1991-2001 decade. Decadal growth for the district was 15.15 per cent. Decadal growth in West Bengal was 17.84 per cent.

Large villages (with 4,000+ population) in Onda CD block are (2011 census figures in brackets): Onda (5,933), Aguri Band Punisol (22,193), Nutangram (4,077) and Chingani (4,004).

Other villages in Onda CD block are (2011 census figures in brackets): Majdiha (1,173), Churamanipur (992), Medinipur (2,662), Lodna (3,072), Kalyani (1,632), Ratanpur (1,822), Santor (1,739), Nikunjapur (2,239), Bahulara (1,124) and Ramsagar (712).

=== Literacy ===
According to the 2011 census the total number of literates in Onda CD block was 144,618 (65.82% of the population over 6 years) out of which males numbered 85,546 (75.44% of the male population over 6 years) and females numbered 60,072 (55.81%) of the female population over 6 years). The gender disparity (the difference between female and male literacy rates) was 19.63%.

As per the 2011 census, literacy in Bankura district was 70.26%, up from 63.44 in 2001 and 52.00% in 1991. Literacy in West Bengal was 77.08% in 2011. Literacy in India in 2011 was 74.04%.

See also – List of West Bengal districts ranked by literacy rate

Literacy in CD blocks of
Bankura district
Bankura Sadar subdivision
Saltora – 61.45%
Mejia – 66.83%
Gangajalghati – 68.11%
Chhatna – 65.73%
Bankura I – 68.74%
Bankura II – 73.59%
Barjora – 71.67%
Onda – 65.82%
Bishnupur subdivision
Indas – 71.70%
Joypur – 74.57%
Patrasayer – 64.8%
Kotulpur – 78.01%
Sonamukhi – 66.16%
Bishnupur – 66.30%
Khatra subdivision
Indpur – 67.42%
Ranibandh – 68.53%
Khatra – 72.18%
Hirbandh – 64.18%
Raipur – 71.33%
Sarenga – 74.25%
Simlapal – 68.44%
Taldangra – 70.87%
2011 Census: CD Block Wise

Primary Census Abstract Data

=== Language and religion ===
Religion in Onda CD block (2011)
Hinduism	83.30%
Islam	13.68%
Other (tribal religion)	2.85%
Other or not stated	0.17%

In the 2011 census, Hindus numbered 201,742 and formed 83.30% of the population in Onda CD block. Muslims numbered 34,620 and formed 13.68% of the population. Christians numbered 86 and formed 0.03% of the population. Others numbered 7,536 and formed 2.98% of the population. Others include Addi Bassi, Marang Boro, Santal, Saranath, Sari Dharma, Sarna, Alchchi, Bidin, Sant, Saevdharm, Seran, Saran, Sarin, Kheria, and other religious communities. In 2001, Hindus were 86.38% and Muslims 11.25% of the population respectively.

Languages of Onda CD block (2011)
1. Bengali (96.1%)
2. Santali (3.86%)
3. Others (0.07%)

At the time of the 2011 census, 96.07% of the population spoke Bengali and 3.86% Santali as their first language.

== Rural poverty ==
In Onda CD block 44.39% families were living below poverty line in 2007. According to the Rural Household Survey in 2005, 28.87% of the total number of families were BPL families in the Bankura district.

== Economy ==
=== Livelihood ===
Livelihood
in Onda CD block
1. Cultivators (24.5%)
2. Agricultural labourers (46.7%)
3. Household industries (4.62%)
4. Other Workers (24.1%)

In the Onda CD block in 2011, among the class of total workers, cultivators numbered 24,522 and formed 24.53%, agricultural labourers numbered 46,704 and formed 46.71%, household industry workers numbered 4,616 and formed 4.62% and other workers numbered 24,142 and formed 24.15%. Total workers numbered 99,984 and formed 39.52% of the total population, and non-workers numbered 153,000 and formed 60.48% of the population.

Note: In the census records a person is considered a cultivator, if the person is engaged in cultivation/ supervision of land owned by self/government/institution. When a person who works on another person's land for wages in cash or kind or share, is regarded as an agricultural labourer. Household industry is defined as an industry conducted by one or more members of the family within the household or village, and one that does not qualify for registration as a factory under the Factories Act. Other workers are persons engaged in some economic activity other than cultivators, agricultural labourers and household workers. It includes factory, mining, plantation, transport and office workers, those engaged in business and commerce, teachers, entertainment artistes and so on.

=== Infrastructure ===
There are 271 inhabited villages in the Onda CD block, as per the District Census Handbook, Bankura, 2011. 100% villages have power supply. 266 villages (98.15%) have drinking water supply. 30 villages (11.07%) have post offices. 257 villages (94.63%) have telephones (including landlines, public call offices and mobile phones). 51 villages (18.82%) have pucca (paved) approach roads and 88 villages (32.47%) have transport communication (includes bus service, rail facility and navigable waterways). 16 villages (5.90%) have agricultural credit societies and 13 villages (4.8%) have banks.

=== Agriculture ===
There were 125 fertiliser depots, 12 seed stores and 76 fair price shops in the Onda CD block.

In 2013–14, persons engaged in agriculture in Onda CD block could be classified as follows: bargadars 12.99%, patta (document) holders 9.32%, small farmers (possessing land between 1 and 2 hectares) 6.96%, marginal farmers (possessing land up to 1 hectare) 21.44% and agricultural labourers 49.29%.

In 2003-04 net area sown in Onda CD block was 26,981 hectares and the area in which more than one crop was grown was 6,712 hectares.

In 2013–14, the total area irrigated in Onda CD block was 18,667 hectares, out of which 9,796 hectares was by canal water, 900 hectares by tank water, 1,140 hectares by river lift irrigation, 606 hectares by deep tubewells, 6,080 hectares by shallow tubewell, 30 hectares by open dug wells and 115 hectares by other methods.

In 2013–14, Onda CD block produced 53,122 tonnes of Aman paddy, the main winter crop, from 19,947 hectares, 6,525 tonnes of Aus paddy from 2,246 hectares, 15,395 tonnes of Boro paddy from 5,020 hectares, 969 tonnes of wheat from 327 hectares and 44,557,000 tonnes of potatoes from 1,984 hectares. It also produced pulses and mustard.

=== Handloom and pottery industries ===
The handloom industry engages the largest number of persons in the non farm sector and hence is important in Bankura district. The handloom industry is well established in all the CD blocks of the district and includes the famous Baluchari saris. In 2004-05 Onda CD Block had 749 looms in operation.

Bankura district is famous for the artistic excellence of its pottery products that include the famous Bankura horse. The range of pottery products is categorised as follows: domestic utilities, terracota and other decorative items and roofing tiles and other heavy pottery items. Around 3,200 families were involved in pottery making in the district in 2002. 234 families were involved in Onda CD block.

=== Banking ===
In 2013–14, Onda CD block had offices of 9 commercial banks and 3 gramin banks.

=== Backward Regions Grant Fund ===
The Bankura district is listed as a backward region and receives financial support from the Backward Regions Grant Fund. The fund, created by the Government of India, is designed to redress regional imbalances in development. As of 2012, 272 districts across the country were listed under this scheme. The list includes 11 districts of West Bengal.

== Transport ==
In 2013–14, Onda CD block had 2 ferry services and 7 originating/ terminating bus routes.

The Kharagpur-Bankura-Adra line of South Eastern Railway passes through this CD block. There are stations at Kalisen, Ondagram and Ramsagar railway station.

National Highway 14, (old numbering NH 60), running from Morgram to Kharagpur, passes through this CD block.

State Highway 9 running from Durgapur (in Paschim Bardhaman district) to Nayagram (in Jhargram district) passes through this CD block.

== Education ==
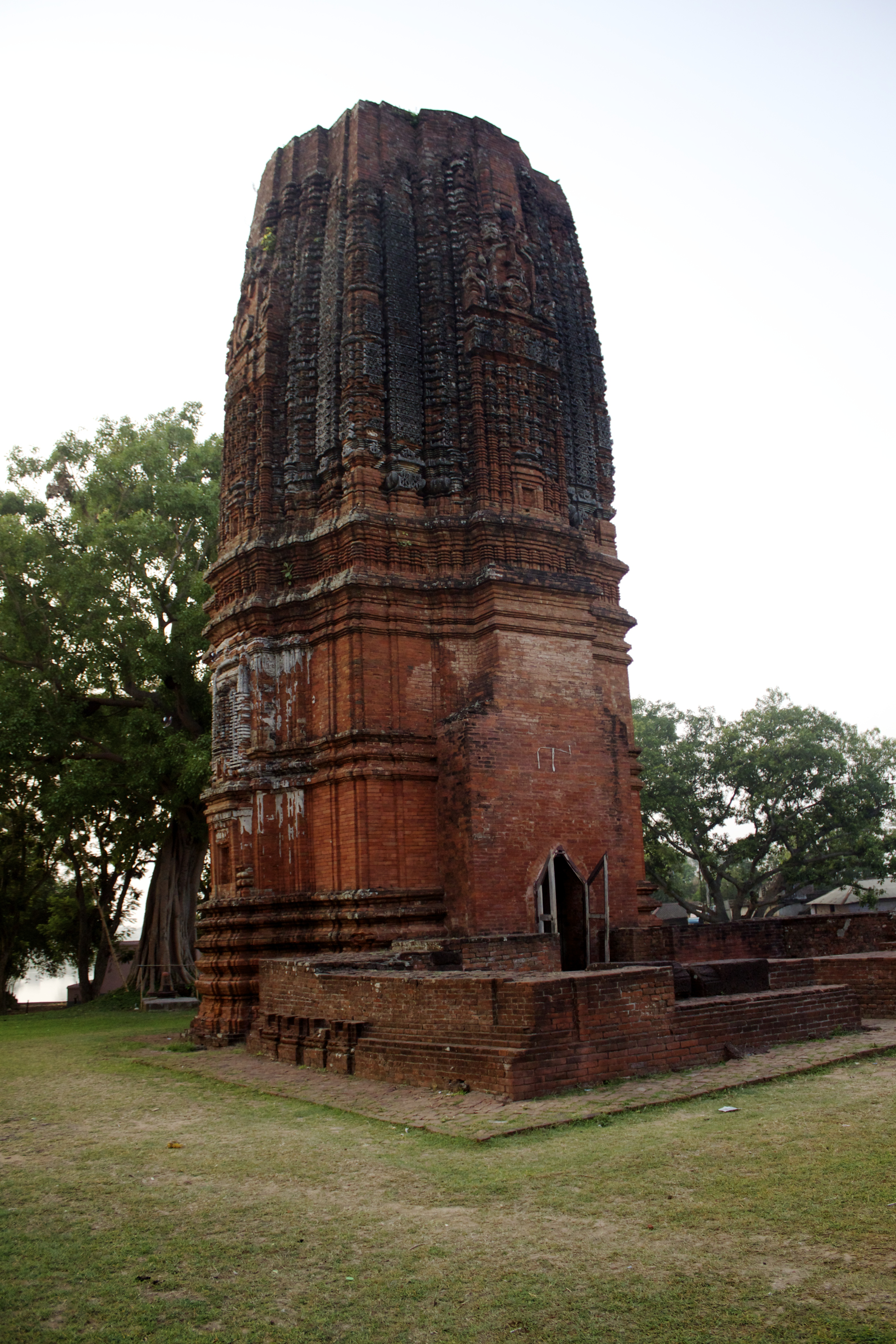
Siddheshwara Temple at Bahulara

In 2013–14, Onda CD block had 246 primary schools with 24,146 students, 32 middle schools with 3,711 students, 16 high schools with 14,390 students and 12 higher secondary schools with 8,442 students. Onda CD block had 1 general college with 1,180 students and 385 institutions for special and non-formal education with 14,880 students.

See also – Education in India

According to the 2011 census, in the Onda CD block, among the 271 inhabited villages, 37 villages did not have a school, 52 villages had two or more primary schools, 65 villages had at least 1 primary and 1 middle school and 29 villages had at least 1 middle and 1 secondary school.

Onda Thana Mahavidyalaya was established at Murakata in 2007.

== Culture ==
Bahulara, a census village under Onda II village panchayat, is the site of the Siddheshwara temple dedicated to Shiva. It is the finest specimen of brick rekha deul temple ascribed to Pala (medieval) period. It is about 5 km from Ondagram railway station, midway between Bankura and Vishnupur.

At Onda a Dol Mela is held every year for nine days starting on the day of Holi. Datina is a culturally enriched village, situated under Medinipur Gram Panchyat. Here (at Uporpara) a Mela is also held every year for five days starting on Buddha Purnima. Poet Mira Barat informed that, the Kalipuja of Kalidas Chakraborty was famous at his time. The gazan of BURASHIV Dugdheshwar has old tradition of Majhpara, Gogra.

== Healthcare ==
In 2014, Onda CD block had 1 rural hospital and 5 primary health centres with total 66 beds and 12 doctors. It had 35 family welfare sub centres and 1 family welfare centre. 3,807 patients were treated indoor and 252,239 patients were treated outdoor in the hospitals, health centres and subcentres of the CD block.

Onda Rural Hospital, with 30 beds at PO Medinipurgram, is the major government medical facility in the Onda CD block. There are primary health centres at Ratanpur (with 10 beds), Nakaijuri (Ghorasol) (with 10 beds), Ramsagar (with 10 beds), Santore (Garh Kotalpur) (with 10 beds) and Nikunjapur (with 10 beds). A super speciality hospital has been established at Gogra under a scheme of the central government named Backward Region Rural Fund (BGRF).
