= Murakata =

- Village
- Location in West Bengal, India Murakata (India)
- Coordinates: 23.1693°N 87.1635°E
- Country: India
- State: West Bengal
- District: Bankura

Population (2011)
  - Total: 1,444

Languages
  - Official: Bengali, English
- Time zone: UTC+5:30 (IST)
- PIN: 722144
- Telephone/STD code: 03244
- Lok Sabha constituency: Bishnupur
- Vidhan Sabha constituency: Onda
- Website: bankura.gov.in

Murakata is a village in the Onda CD block in the Bankura Sadar subdivision of the Bankura district in the state of West Bengal, India.

== Geography ==
Places in Bankura Sadar subdivision in Bankura district
CT: census town, R: rural/ urban centre, H: hill centre, T: temple, B: barrage
Owing to space constraints in the small map, the actual locations in a larger map may vary slightly

=== Location ===
Murakata is located at 23.1693°N 87.1635°E.

=== Area overview ===
The map alongside shows the Bankura Sadar subdivision of Bankura district. Physiographically, this area is part of the Bankura Uplands in the west gradually merging with the Bankura-Bishnupur Rarh Plains in the north-east. The western portions are characterised by undulating terrain with many hills and ridges. The area is having a gradual descent from the Chota Nagpur Plateau. The soil is laterite red and hard beds are covered with scrub jungle and sal wood. Gradually it gives way to just uneven rolling lands but the soil continues to be lateritic. There are coal mines in the northern part, along the Damodar River. It is a predominantly rural area with 89% of the population living in rural areas and only 11% living in the urban areas.

Note: The map alongside presents some of the notable locations in the subdivision. All places marked in the map are linked in the larger full screen map.

== Demographics ==
According to the 2011 Census of India, Murakata had a total population of 1,444, of which 752 (52%) were males and 692 (48%) were females. There were 151 persons in the age range of 0–6 years. The total number of literate persons in Murakata was 834 (64.50% of the population over 6 years).

== Education ==
Onda Thana Mahavidyalaya was established in 2007. Affiliated with the Bankura University, it offers honours courses in Bengali, Sanskrit, English and history, and a general course in arts.

Kalisen High School was established in 1970, this is a co-Ed school. It's a Bengali medium school. The school has library, play ground, and also a big surrounding area.

Nikunjapur High School is a Bengali-medium coeducational institution established in 1927. It has facilities for teaching from class V to class XII. The school has 11 computer, a library with 160 books and a playground.

Murakata Primary School is a Bengali-medium coeducational institution established in 1947. It has facilities for teaching from class I to class IV.
