= Ajit Ray =

Indian politician

Member of the West Bengal Legislative Assembly
- In office 2016–2021
- Preceded by: Dipali Saha
- Succeeded by: Dibakar Gharami
- Constituency: Sonamukhi

Personal details
- Party: CPIM
- Profession: Politician

Ajit Ray is an Indian politician from West Bengal. He was elected as a Member of the Legislative Assembly in 2016 West Bengal Legislative Assembly election from Sonamukhi, as a member of the CPIM.
