= Dibakar Gharami =

Indian politician

Minister of State, Government of West Bengal
- Incumbent
- Assumed office 1 June 2026
- Governor: R. N. Ravi
- Chief Minister: Suvendu Adhikari

Member of the West Bengal Legislative Assembly
- Incumbent
- Assumed office 2 May 2021
- Preceded by: Ajit Ray
- Constituency: Sonamukhi

Personal details
- Party: Bharatiya Janata Party
- Spouse: Pratima Gharami
- Parent: Narayan Gharami
- Occupation: Cultivator
- Profession: Politician

Dibakar Gharami (Bengali: দিবাকর ঘরামী) is an Indian politician from West Bengal and a member of Bharatiya Janata Party. He was first elected to the West Bengal Legislative Assembly from the Sonamukhi Assembly constituency in the 2021 West Bengal Assembly election, defeating Dr. Shyamal Santra of the All India Trinamool Congress (AITC) by a margin of 10,888 votes. In May 2026, he was re-elected from the same constituency, securing a second consecutive term in the Assembly.

== Early life and education ==
Gharami is from Bakura district of West Bengal. He is VIII Passed from Puratangram Junior High School in the year 1993.

== Political career ==
He is a member of West Bengal Legislative Assembly. On 1 June 2026, he took oath as a Minister of State, along with eighteen other members. On 10 June, as cabinet portfolios were distributed, Dibakar was assigned Department of Cooperation, Department of Forests and Department of Environment.

=== Electoral performance ===
West Bengal Legislative Assembly
Year	Constituency	Party	Votes	%	Opponent	Party	Votes	%	Margin	Result
2021	Sonamukhi	BJP	98,161	47.25	Shyamal Santra	AITC	87,273	42.01	10,888	Won
2026	Sonamukhi	BJP	115,549	52.08	Kallol Saha	AITC	86,139	38.83	29,410	Won

== See also ==
- 2026 West Bengal Legislative Assembly election
- List of chief ministers of West Bengal
- West Bengal Legislative Assembly
- 18th West Bengal Assembly
