= Khandaghosh Assembly constituency =

Khandaghosh
- Constituency No. 259 for the West Bengal Legislative Assembly
- Interactive Map Outlining Khandaghosh Assembly Constituency

Constituency details
- Country: India
- Region: East India
- State: West Bengal
- District: Purba Bardhaman
- Lok Sabha constituency: Bishnupur
- Established: 1951
- Total electors: 194,747
- Reservation: SC

Member of Legislative Assembly
- 18th West Bengal Legislative Assembly
- Incumbent Nabin Chandra Bag
- Party: DTC
- Elected year: 2026

Khandaghosh Assembly constituency is an assembly constituency in Purba Bardhaman district in the Indian state of West Bengal. It is reserved for scheduled castes.

== Overview ==
As per order of the Delimitation Commission, No. 259 Khandaghosh (SC) assembly constituency covers Khandaghosh community development block and Adra, Bhuri, Gohogram, Khano, Maszidpur, Sanko and Satinadi gram panchayats of Galsi II CD Block.

Khandaghosh assembly constituency is part of No. 37 Bishnupur Lok Sabha constituency.

== Members of the Legislative Assembly ==
Year	Name	Party
1951	Janab Mohammad Hossain	Indian National Congress
1957	No constituency	
1962	Jahar Lal Banerjee	Indian National Congress
1967	P. Dhibar	Indian National Congress
1969	Gobardhan Pakray	Samyukta Socialist Party
1971	Purna Chandra Malik	Communist Party of India (Marxist)
1972	Monoranjan Pramanick	Indian National Congress
1977	Purna Chandra Malik	Communist Party of India (Marxist)
1982	Purna Chandra Malik	Communist Party of India (Marxist)
1987	Shibaprasad Dalui	Communist Party of India (Marxist)
1991	Shibaprasad Dalui	Communist Party of India (Marxist)
1996	Shibaprasad Dalui	Communist Party of India (Marxist)
2001	Jyotsna Singh	Communist Party of India (Marxist)
2006	Prasanta Majhi	Communist Party of India (Marxist)
2011	Nabin Chandra Bag	Communist Party of India (Marxist)
2016	Nabin Chandra Bag	Trinamool Congress
2021	Nabin Chandra Bag	Trinamool Congress
2026	Nabin Chandra Bag	Trinamool Congress

== Election results ==
=== 2026 ===
2026 West Bengal Legislative Assembly election: Khandaghosh
Party	Candidate	Votes	%	±%
AITC	Nabin Chandra Bag	104,183	46.67	▼1.18
BJP	Goutam Dhara	95,899	42.96	▲4.7
CPI(M)	Ramjiban Ray	17,535	7.85	▼2.67
NOTA	None of the above	1,271	0.57	▼0.32
Majority		8,284	3.71	▼5.88
Turnout		223,246	95.49	▲5.72
AITC hold		Swing		

=== 2021 ===
2021 West Bengal Legislative Assembly election: Khandaghosh
Party	Candidate	Votes	%	±%
AITC	Nabin Chandra Bag	104,264	47.85	▲1.97
BJP	Bijan Mandal	83,378	38.26	▲31.15
CPI(M)	Asima Roy	22,923	10.52	▼33.73
BSP	Protul Biswas	3,465	1.59	▲0.18
NOTA	None of the above	1,944	0.89	
Majority		20,886	9.59	
Turnout		217,897	89.77	
AITC hold		Swing		

=== 2016 ===
2016 West Bengal Legislative Assembly election: Khandaghosh
Party	Candidate	Votes	%	±%
AITC	Nabin Chandra Bag	90,151	45.88	▲1.03
CPI(M)	Asima Roy	86,949	44.25	▼7.86
BJP	Ashoke Santra	13,973	7.11	▲4.07
BSP	Protul Biswas	2,780	1.41	New entry
NOTA	None of the above	2,624	1.34	New entry
Majority		3,202	1.63	▼5.66
Turnout		1,96,477	89.12	▼3.70
AITC gain from CPI(M)		Swing		

=== 2011 ===
2011 West Bengal Legislative Assembly election: Khandaghosh
Party	Candidate	Votes	%	±%
CPI(M)	Nabin Chandra Bag	94,284	52.11	
AITC	Alok Kumar Majhi	81,137	44.85	
BJP	Krishna Das Singha	5,505	3.04	
Majority		13,147	7.29	
Turnout		1,80,926	92.82	
CPI(M) hold		Swing		

=== 2006 ===
Prasanta Majhi of the CPI (M) won the Khandaghosh (SC) assembly seat in 2006 defeating his nearest rival Biswanath Roy of Trinamool Congress. Contests in most years were multi cornered but only winners and runners are being mentioned. In 2001, Jyotsna Singha of CPI (M) defeated Banshi Badan Roy of Trinamool. In 1996, 1991 and 1986 Shiba Prasad Dalui of CPI (M) defeated Basudev Mandal, Sankar Nath Maji and Pramatha Dhibar, all of Congress, in the respective years. In 1982 and 1977, Purna Chandra Malik of CPI (M) defeated Manoranjan Pramanik of Congress.

=== 1972 ===
Monoranjan Pramanik of Congress won the seat in 1972. In 1971, the seat was won by Purna Chandra Malik of CPI (M). Gobardhan Pakray of Samyukta Socialist Party won it in 1969. P. Dhibar of Congress won the seat in 1967. Jaharlal Banerjee of Congress won it in 1962. Khandaghosh constituency was not there in 1957 and in 1951 it was a general constituency. It was won by Jb Md Hossain of Congress.
