= Dipali Saha =

Indian politician

MLA of Sonamukhi
- In office 2011–2016
- Preceded by: Niresh Bagdi
- Succeeded by: Ajit Roy

Personal details
- Party: All India Trinamool Congress

Dipali Saha is an Indian politician belonging to All India Trinamool Congress. She was elected as a legislator of the West Bengal Legislative Assembly from Sonamukhi in 2011.
