= Saumitra Khan =

Indian Member of Parliament

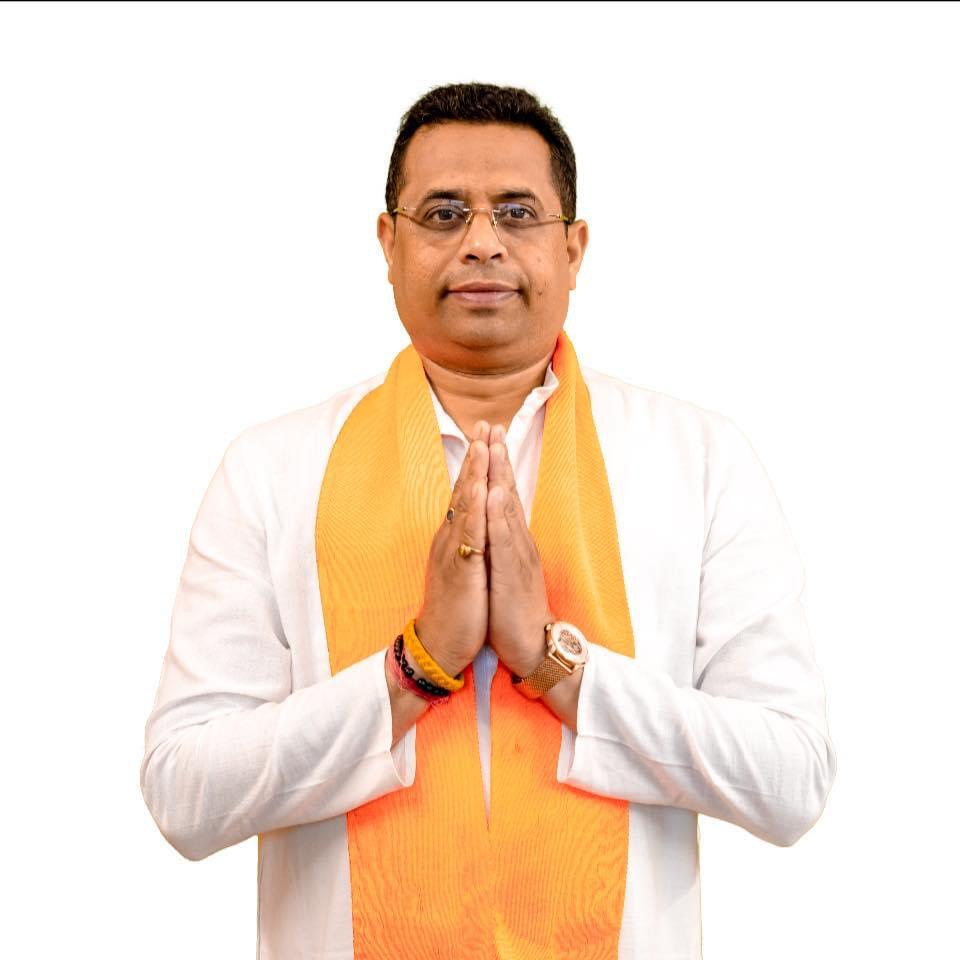

Member of Parliament, Lok Sabha
- Incumbent
- Assumed office 16 May 2014
- Preceded by: Susmita Bauri
- Constituency: Bishnupur

Member of West Bengal Legislative Assembly
- In office 13 May 2011 – 16 May 2014
- Preceded by: Kalpana Koley
- Succeeded by: Shyamal Santra
- Constituency: Katulpur

Personal details
- Born: 8 December 1980 (age 45) Durlabhpur, Bankura district, West Bengal, India
- Party: Bharatiya Janata Party (2019-present)
- Other political affiliations: Trinamool Congress (2014-2019); Indian National Congress (till 2014)
- Education: Panchmura Mahavidyalaya
- Parliamentary Committee Memberships: 2019 onwards: Member, Committee on Welfare of Scheduled Castes and Scheduled Tribes; 2019 onwards: Member, Standing Committee on Transport, Tourism and Culture; 2019 onwards: Member, Consultative Committee, Ministry of Social Justice & Empowerment; 2016 - 2019: Member, Standing Committee on Commerce; 2014 - 2016: Member, Standing Committee on Energy; 2014: Member, Consultative Committee, Ministry of Urban Development, Housing and Urban Poverty Alleviation

Saumitra Khan (born 8 December 1980) is an Indian politician representing the Bishnupur constituency of West Bengal in the Lok Sabha since 2014. He joined Bharatiya Janata Party in 2019 and currently (as of December 2020) serves as the president of Bharatiya Janata Yuva Morcha West Bengal.

Khan started his political career with Indian National Congress and was elected to West Bengal Legislative Assembly from Katulpur constituency. In 2013, he switched to the Trinamool Congress, which ruled West Bengal. In the 2014 Indian general election, he was elected to the Lok Sabha from Bishnupur constituency. In early 2019, he defected to Bharatiya Janata Party, the ruling party at the centre. Following his defection, a police case was lodged against him for allegedly extorting money from job aspirants. The Kolkata High Court prevented him from entering his constituency. He won with a margin of more than 78,000 votes without even holding any political rally in the area.

== Personal life ==
Khan was born in a Bengali Hindu family of Shunri jati on 8 December 1980 to Dhanonjoy Khan and Chhaya Rani Khan at Durlabhpur in Bankura district, West Bengal. He studied at Panchmura Mahavidyalaya. His wife, Sujata Mondal Khan, joined Trinamool Congress, after Saumitra Khan filed for divorce. On 7 February 2023, with the order of the Hon'ble court of Bankura, he got divorced. This has led to an ongoing controversy in West Bengal politics. Another controversy occurred when he demanded a separate state of Junglemahal state.

== Political career ==
In the 2011 West Bengal Legislative Assembly election, Khan was elected to the assembly from Katulpur constituency as a candidate of the Indian National Congress. On 12 December 2013, he announced his intention to join the ruling Trinamool Congress. He alleged that the state Congress unit was ignoring the Bankura district. Four days later, he officially joined Trinamool Congress.

In 2014 Indian general election, Khan was elected to the 16th Lok Sabha from Bishnupur constituency. After getting elected, he said that his priority as an MP would be to develop Bishnupur as a tourist spot and to protect the rights of workers who make Baluchari Sari. On 9 January 2019, he defected to Bharatiya Janata Party. Subsequently, he was expelled by his former party. The Times of India reported that Mukul Roy, who himself defected to the Bharatiya Janata Party played an important role in recruiting Khan. The "dynastic rule" in the Trinamool Congress and the political violence in the state were the reasons cited by Khan to switch parties.

In February 2019 it was alleged that Khan had extorted money from job aspirants on false promises. The Kolkata High Court announced that he could not be arrested though it prevented him from entering Bankura. In the following month, Khan was interrogated by the Bankura police. On 12 April, the Supreme Court of India refused to overturn the ban on him although he was allowed to enter the district for filing his nomination papers. In the absence of Khan, his wife Sujata Khan started campaigning for him for the upcoming general election. Khan managed to win from the same constituency with a margin of 78,047 votes even without holding any roadshow or addressing any political rally.
