= Mohammad Shamsuzzoha =

Bangladeshi academic and writer

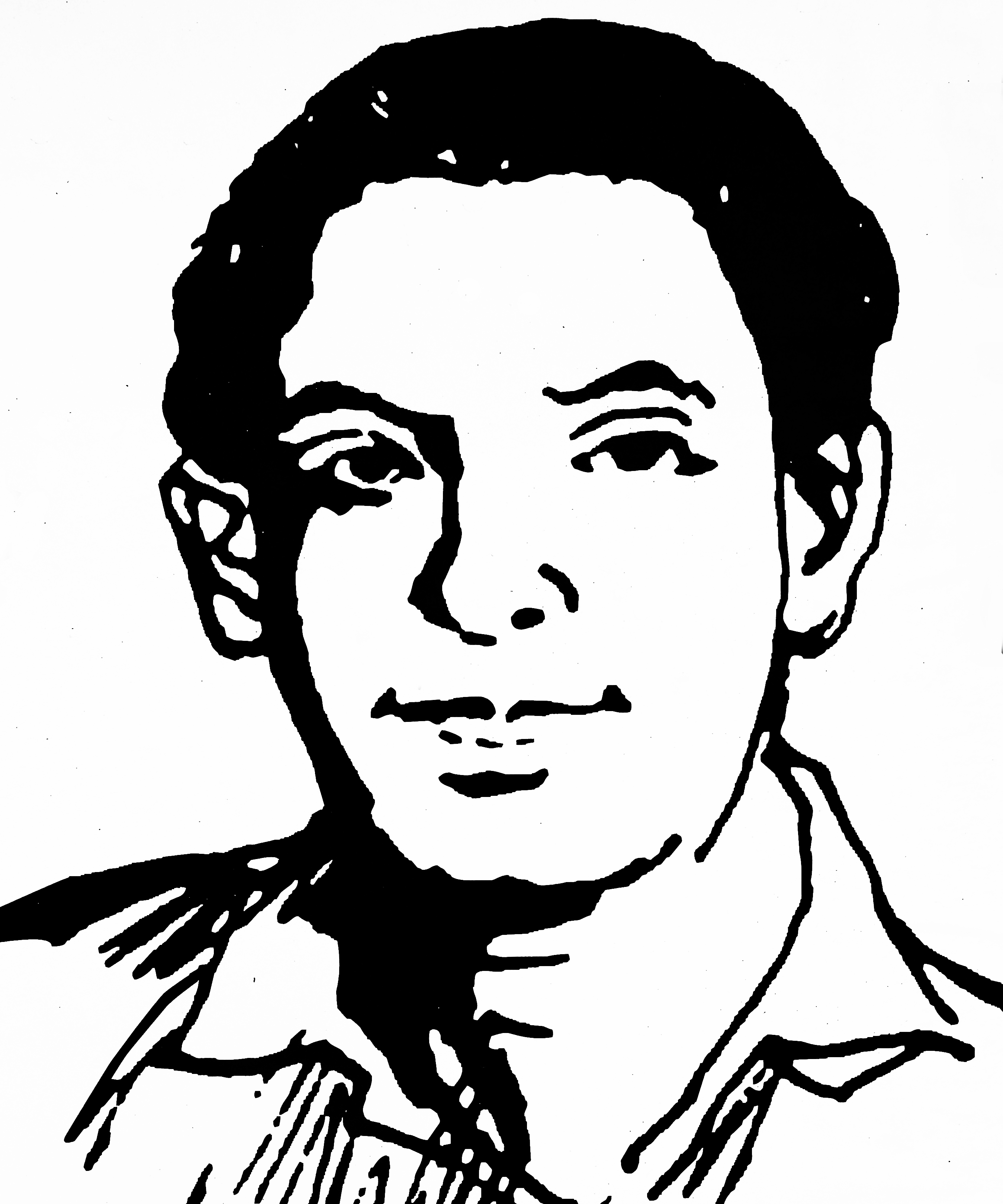
- Samsuzzoha
- Born: 1 May 1934; Onda, Bengal, British India
- Died: 18 February 1969 (aged 34); Rajshahi, East Pakistan, Pakistan
- Education: Imperial College London
- Occupation: Teacher
- Movement: 1969 uprising in East Pakistan
- Spouse: Nilufar Zoha
- Awards: Independence Day Award

Mohammad Shamsuzzoha (Bengali: মোহাম্মদ শামসুজ্জোহা; 1 May 1934 – 18 February 1969) was a Bengali writer, professor, and proctor at the University of Rajshahi. Shamsuzzoha was the first university teacher in erstwhile East Pakistan (now Bangladesh) who was killed by the Pakistani military forces at the eve of the 1969 revolution movement of East Pakistan, which ultimately became the Bangladesh Liberation War. In 2008, he was awarded the Independence Day Award.

== Early life ==
He was born in Onda, Bankura, West Bengal, British India. After the partition of Bengal, he migrated to erstwhile East Bengal in 1950. He passed his matriculation exam in 1948 from Bankura Zilla School and passed ISc in 1950 from Bankura Christian College. He achieved a BSc (honours) degree in chemistry in 1953 and an MSc in 1954 from Dhaka University. Mohammad Shamsuzzoha also participated bravely in the Bengali language movement during his university life. In 1964 he obtained his PhD degree from Imperial College London.

== Career ==
At first Mohammad Shamsuzzoha joined Rajshahi University as a development officer in 1961, and that year he also became a lecturer in the Department of Chemistry. He was promoted to reader of the Chemistry Department. On 1 May 1968, he received the proctor post of the university. He was the first university teacher who was martyred from 1947 to 1969.

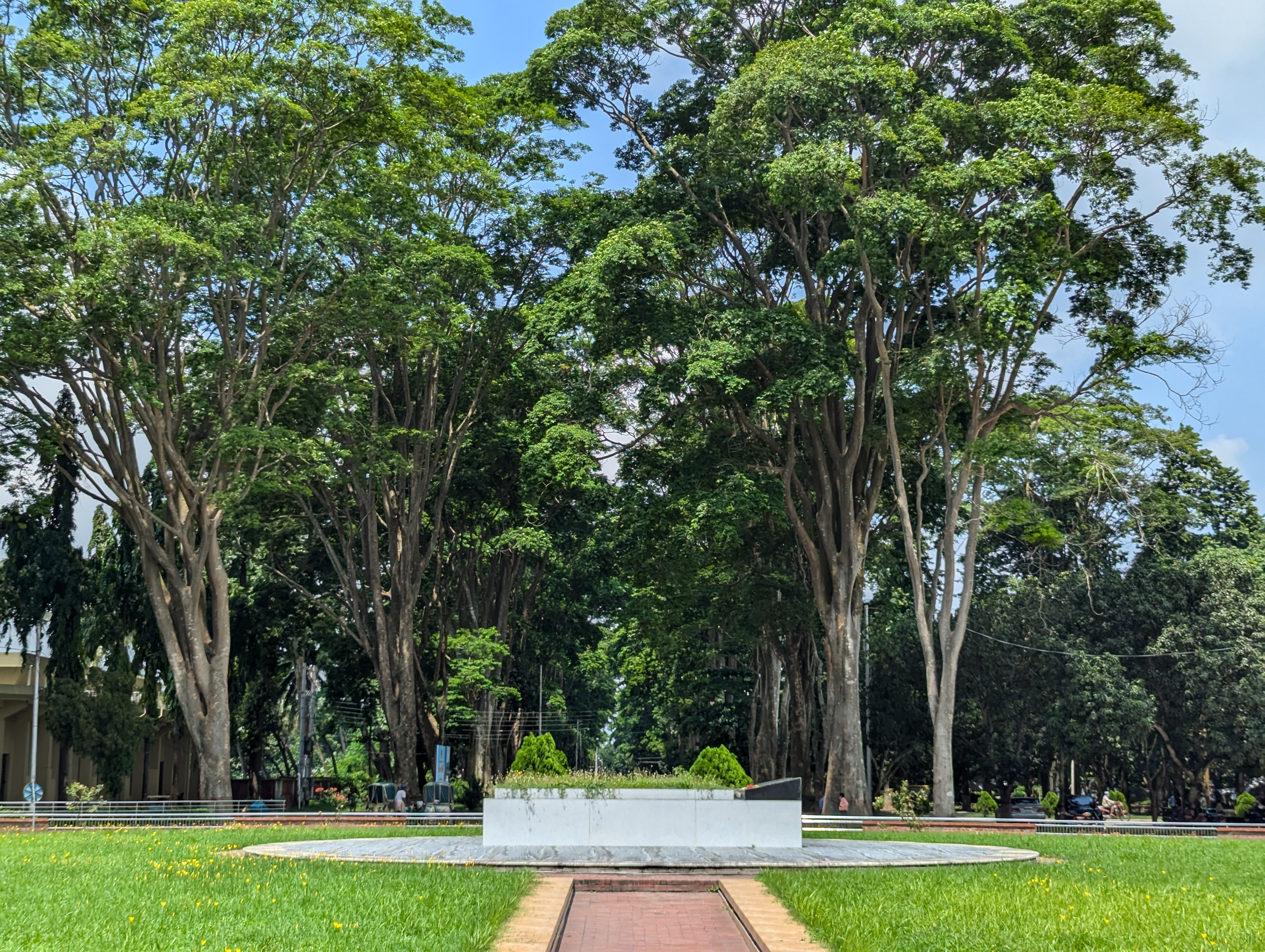
Grave of Shamsuzzoha in Rajshahi University

== Death ==
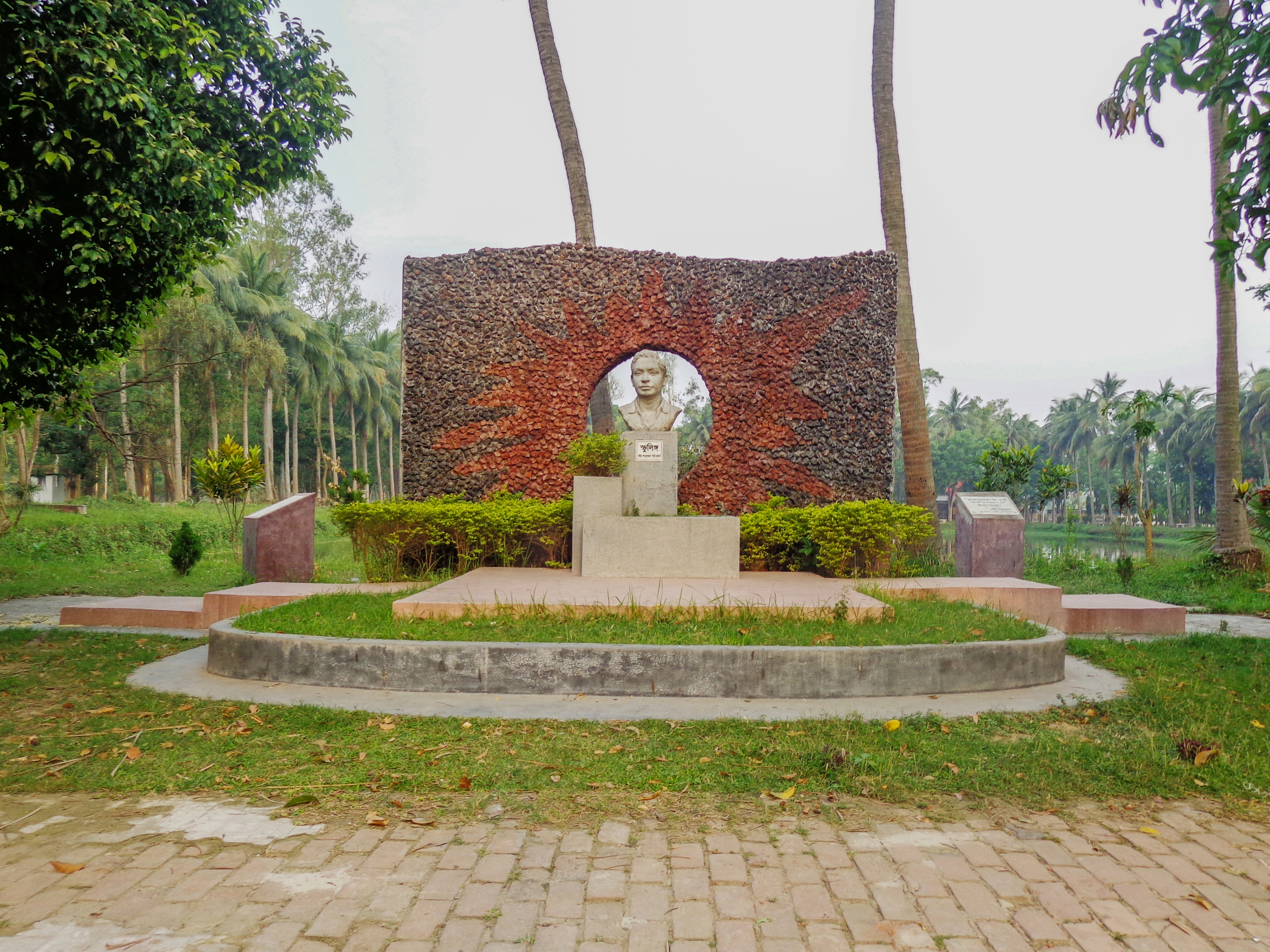
Memorial Sculpture of Martyr Shamsuzzoha

Following the murder of Sergeant Zahurul Haq in custody, one of the accused in the Agartala Conspiracy Case on 15 February, the students of Rajshahi University started staging demonstrations. On 17 February, the students were injured by the Pakistani police. On the same day, local administration imposed section 144 on the Natore-Rajshahi Highway near to Rajshahi University. When the students violated the section, the Pakistani army was deployed to shoot the students, but Shamsuzzoha talked with them and urged them not to fire. When the tension grew, the army fired on Shamsuzzoha. He was taken to the hospital and died there. A memorial sculpture was built right beside the Shahid Shamsuzzoha Hall, called "Sfulinga" for Shamsuzzoha as a symbol of respect.

== Legacy ==
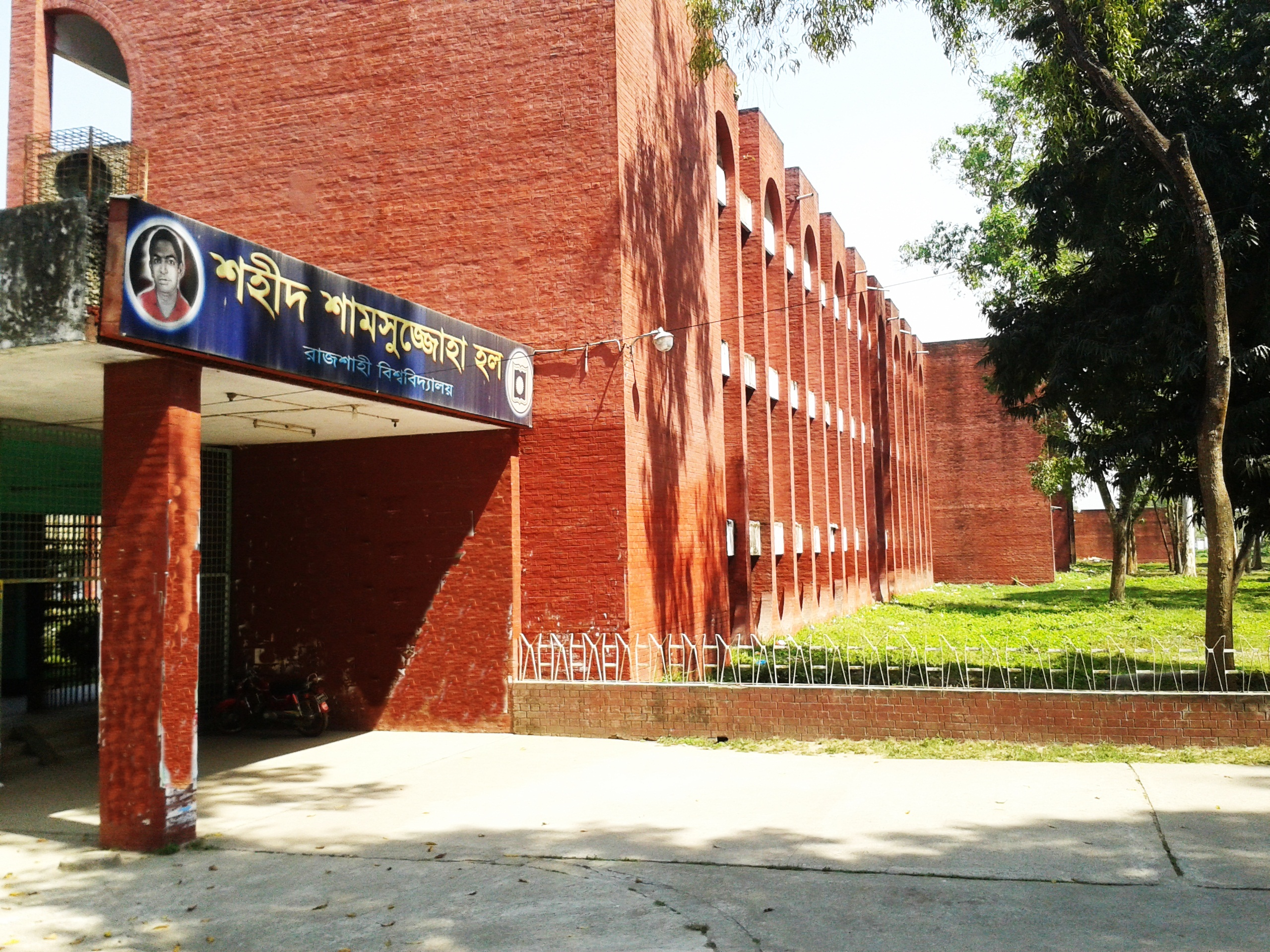
Shaheed Shamsuzzoha Hall in Rajshahi University

Mohammad Shamsuzzoha was buried in front of the administration building of Rajshahi University. His death added a new dimension to the anti-Ayub mass movement, as well as the fall of the Ayub government was quickened. 18 February is observed as Shahid Zoha Dibos (Martyr Zoha Day) in Bangladesh. A student hall of the University of Rajshahi was named Shaheed Shamsuzzoha Hall in commemoration of his highest sacrifice for the cause of the nation.
