= Harakali Protiher =

Indian politician

Member of the West Bengal Legislative Assembly
- In office 2 May 2021 – 2026
- Preceded by: Shyamal Santra
- Succeeded by: Lakshmi Kanta Majumdar
- Constituency: Katulpur

Personal details
- Party: TMC
- Education: Master of Arts
- Alma mater: Vinayaka Missions University
- Profession: Assistant Teacher

Harakali Protiher is a politician from Katulpur Assembly constituency in Bankura District. He was elected as a member of West Bengal Legislative Assembly from Katulpur Assembly constituency in May 2021.
