= Pashupati Mandal =

Indian politician

Member of Parliament, Lok Sabha
- In office 1962-1971
- Succeeded by: Ajit Kumar Saha
- Constituency: Vishnupur
- In office 1952-1962
- Succeeded by: J.M.Biswas
- Constituency: Bankura, West Bengal

Personal details
- Born: Vill. Chingani, P.O. Onda, Bankura District, Bengal Presidency, British India
- Party: Indian National Congress
- Spouse: Mithila Bala Mandal
- Children: 4 daughter and 4 sons

Dr Pashupati Mandal was an Indian politician. He was elected to the 3rd and 4th Lok Sabha, lower house of the Parliament of India from Vishnupur, West Bengal as member of the Indian National Congress.

Earlier he was the member of 1st and 2nd Lok Sabha from Bankura seat.
