= Kotulpur Sridhar Temple =

Kotulpur Sridhar temple
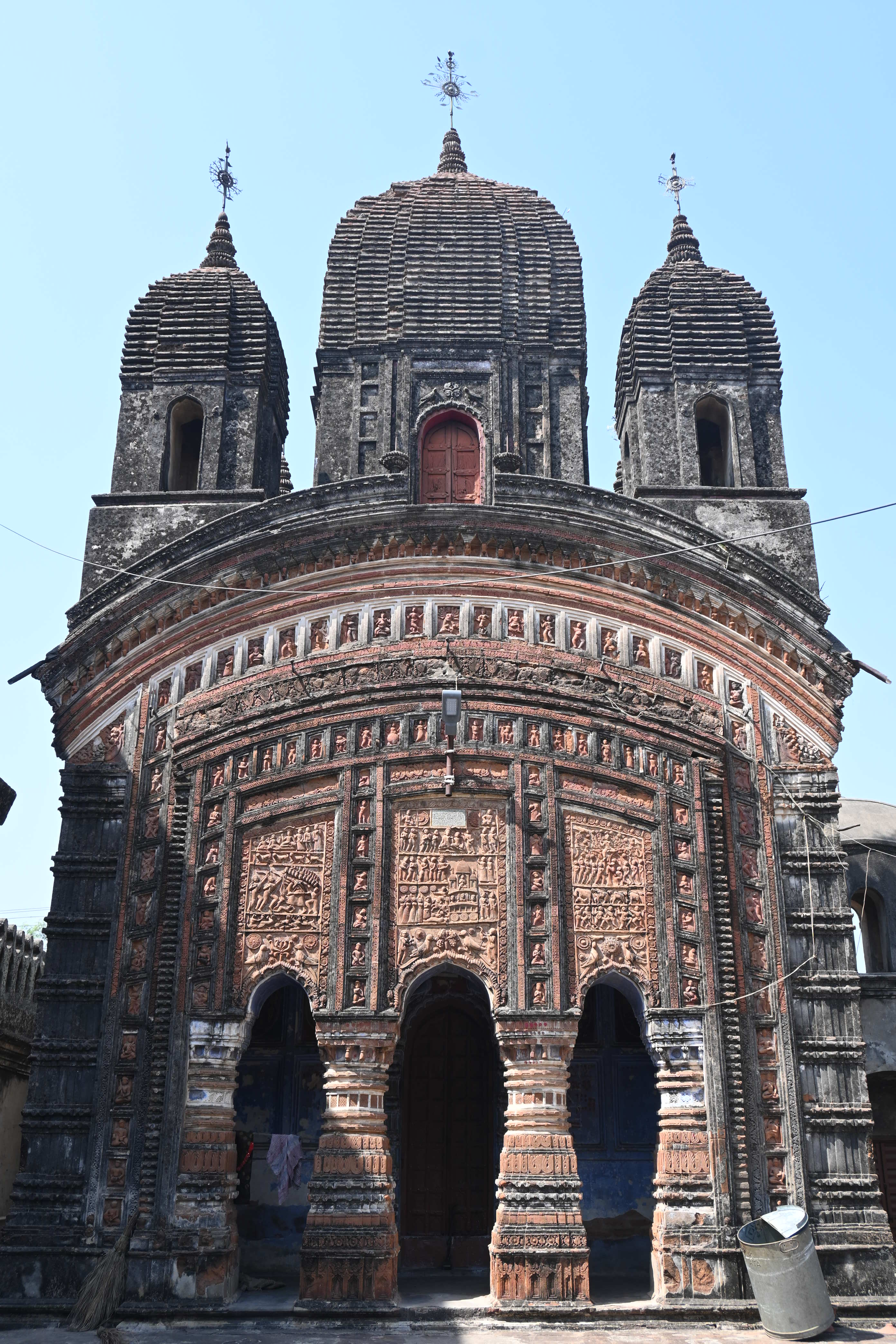

Religion
- Affiliation: Hinduism
- District: Bankura
- Deity: Sridhar Chandra Thakur

Location
- Location: Kotulpur
- State: West Bengal
- Country: India
- Interactive map of Kotulpur Sridhar temple
- Coordinates: 23.0097401°N 87.5885288°E

Architecture
- Type: Bengal temple architecture
- Style: Ratna Style
- Funded by: Bhadra family
- Established: 1833
- Completed: 1833 (1345 Baṅgābda)

Kotulpur Sridhar temple is a Vishnu temple at Shiromanipur village in West Bengal. Hindu God Vishnu is worshiped as Sridhar (Shaligram) in this temple. It is located in Kotulpur police station of Bankura district. Built by the Bhadra family, known as traders and zamindars, the temple stands within the Bhadra palace. The temple is a great example of ratna architecture, which was erected in the early 1830s.

== History ==
A man named Sadananda Bhadra settled in Kotulpur in the late seventeenth century. He established the zamindari by purchasing the zamindari ownership of seventeen taluks near Kotulpur from Maharaja of Burdwan Uday Chand Mahtab. But, Bhadra was essentially a merchant, and traded in salt, thread and mustard. Later, the Zamindar family built the Pancharatna style "Sridhar Jiu Mandir", also built the Durgamondapa, Nahabatkhana, Girigovardhan Mondir, Rasamancha.

Sri Ramakrishna stayed at Kamarpukur for eight months from March 3 to October 10, 1880. According to the Sri Sri Ramakrishna Kathamrita, Ramakrishna appeared at Bhadra Zamindar's house at this time.

== Architecture ==
The temple is a good example of the terracotta temples of Bengal. One of the ratna style of Bengal temple architecture is observed in it. The temple is surrounded by a rectangular plinth, slightly higher than the temple courtyard, but lower than the floor of the temple. There is a threshold (staircase) with three steps between the temple courtyard and the plinth.

The temple has five ratnas (pinnacles) – four at the four corners of the roof and one in the middle – which classifies it as a pancha-ratna style temple. The ratnas or pinnacles of this temple are similar to the rekha deul. The temple gradually tapers towards the sloping roof. Both the length and breadth of the temple are 15 ft. 9 in. and about 30 ft. in height.

== Artwork ==
Panels above the arches of the temple facade
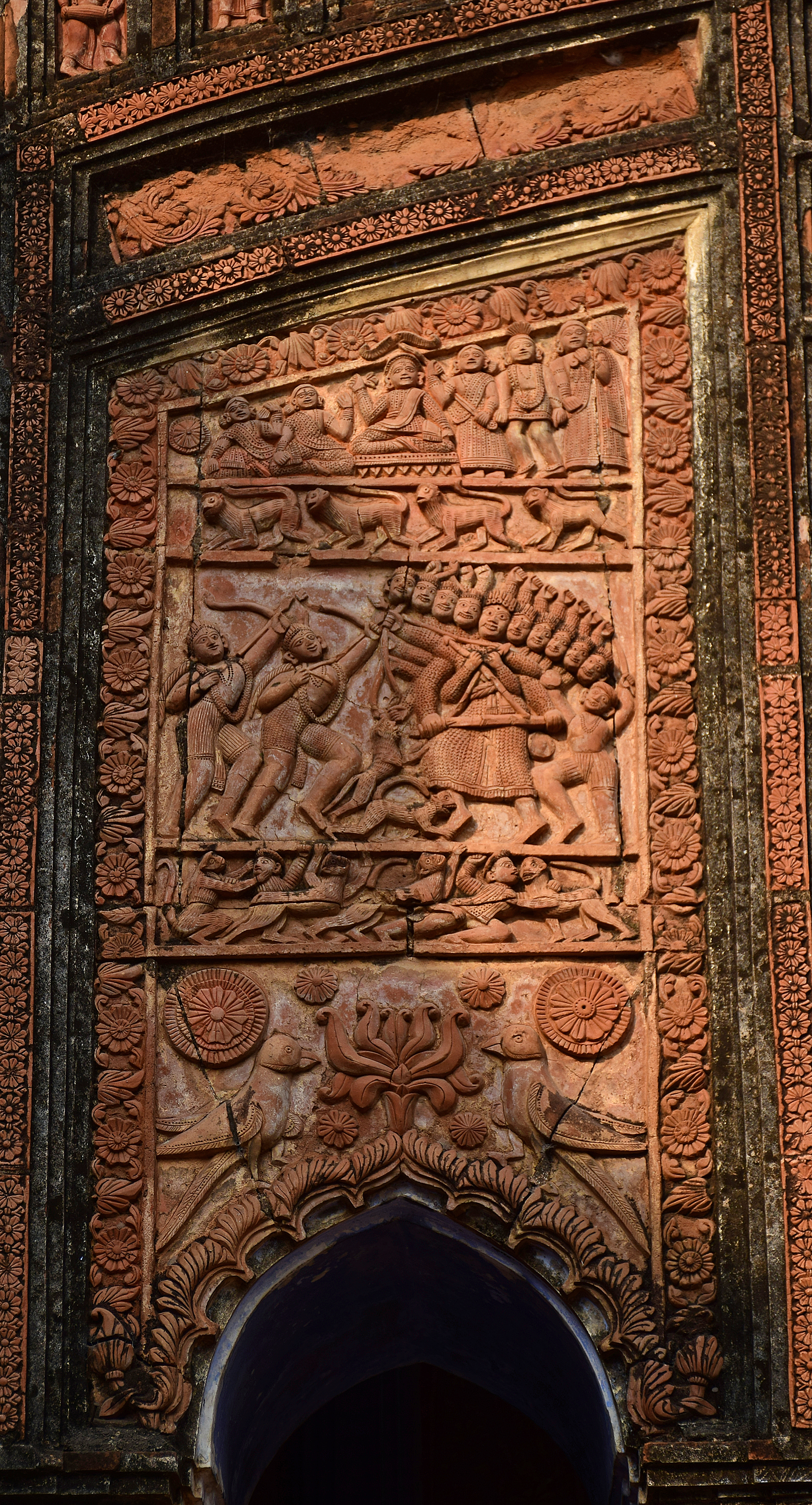
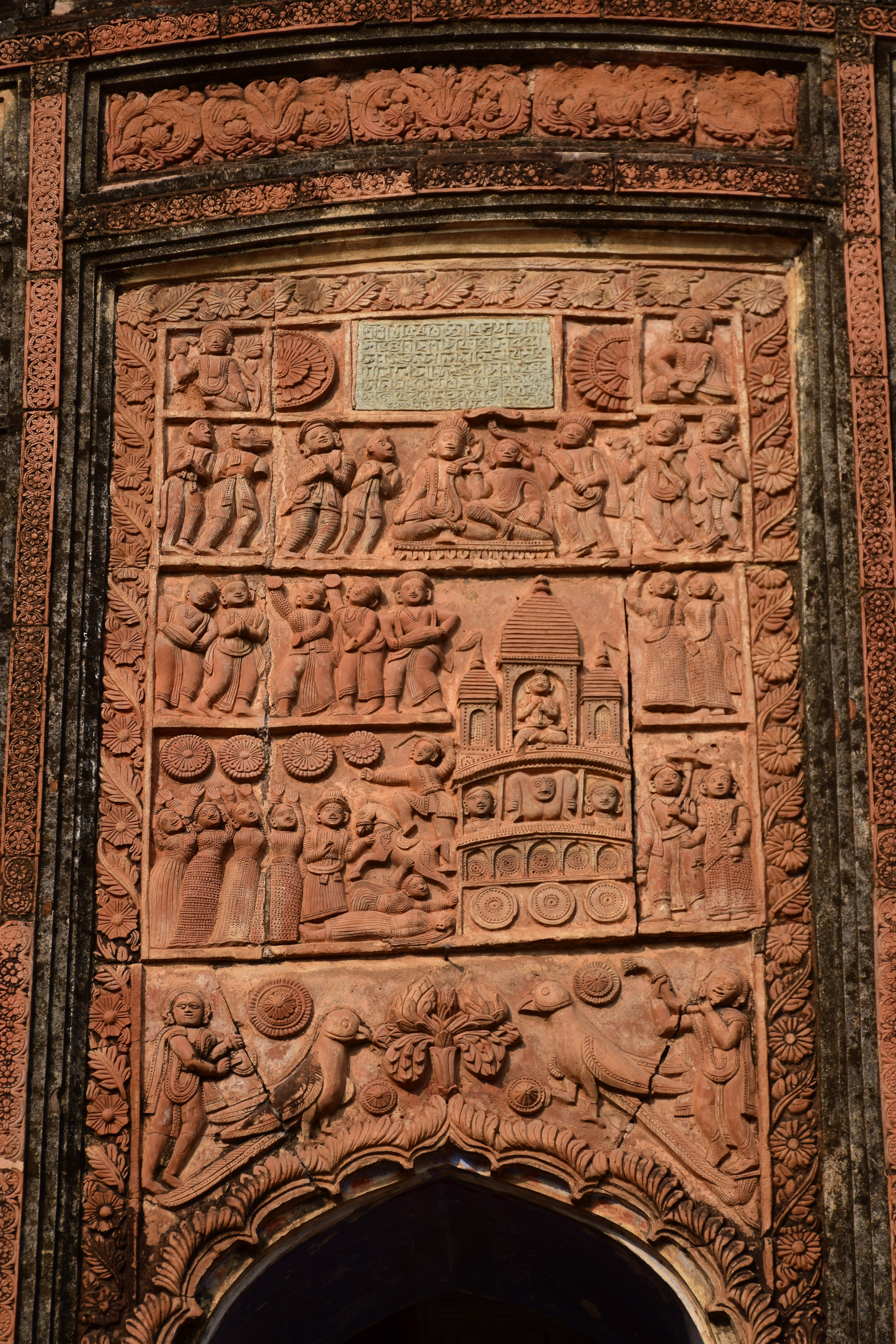
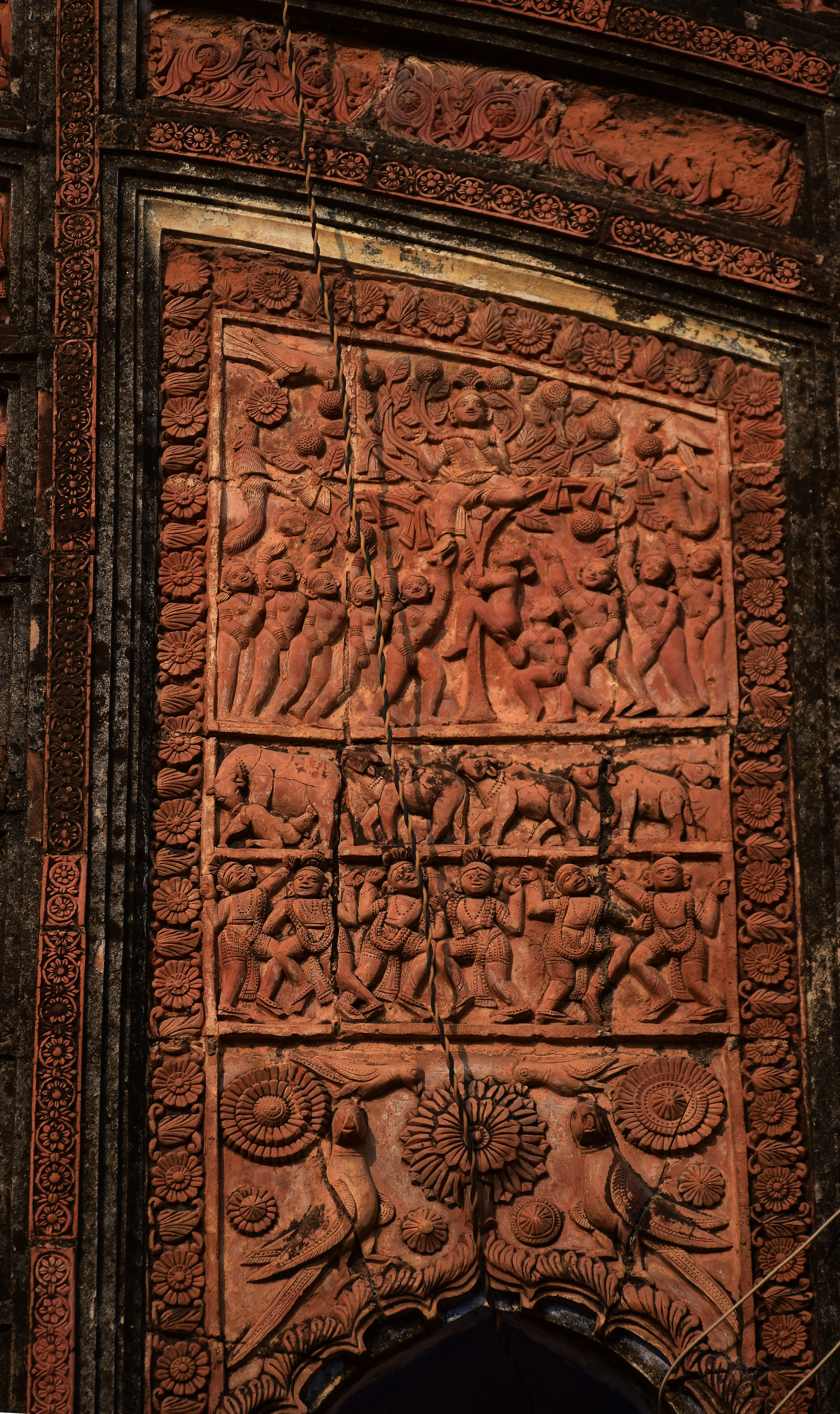
Left: The left panel depicts the battle between Rama and Ravana, Center: Median panel depicting a chariot procession, Right: The right panel is engraved with a Vastraharan scenario.

Terracotta art work and decorations are observed in the temple. The terracotta plaque on the center of the facade is engraved with a scenario of Ratha Yatra (chariot procession). In front of the chariot, there is a crowd procession of dancing men and women in a row, and a figure of kneeling priest is carved on the chariot. The chariot procession shows Krishna and Balarama leaving for Mathura while the gopinis crying and lying down in front of the chariot to persuading Krishna to not leave for Mathura. The upper terracotta plaque contains figures of Rama and Sita, flanked by Lakshmana holding an umbrella and Bharata with chamar in hand, and Hanuman and Jambuban standing with joined hands. The scenario of battle between Rama and Ravana is engraved on the left side terracotta plaque. Right side terracotta plaque has Vastraharan scenario on the top, Gostholila on the middle, and figures of bird and flower are bottom. The Vastraharan scenario shows that Krishna is teaching to give up shame from the 8th side of the creature.

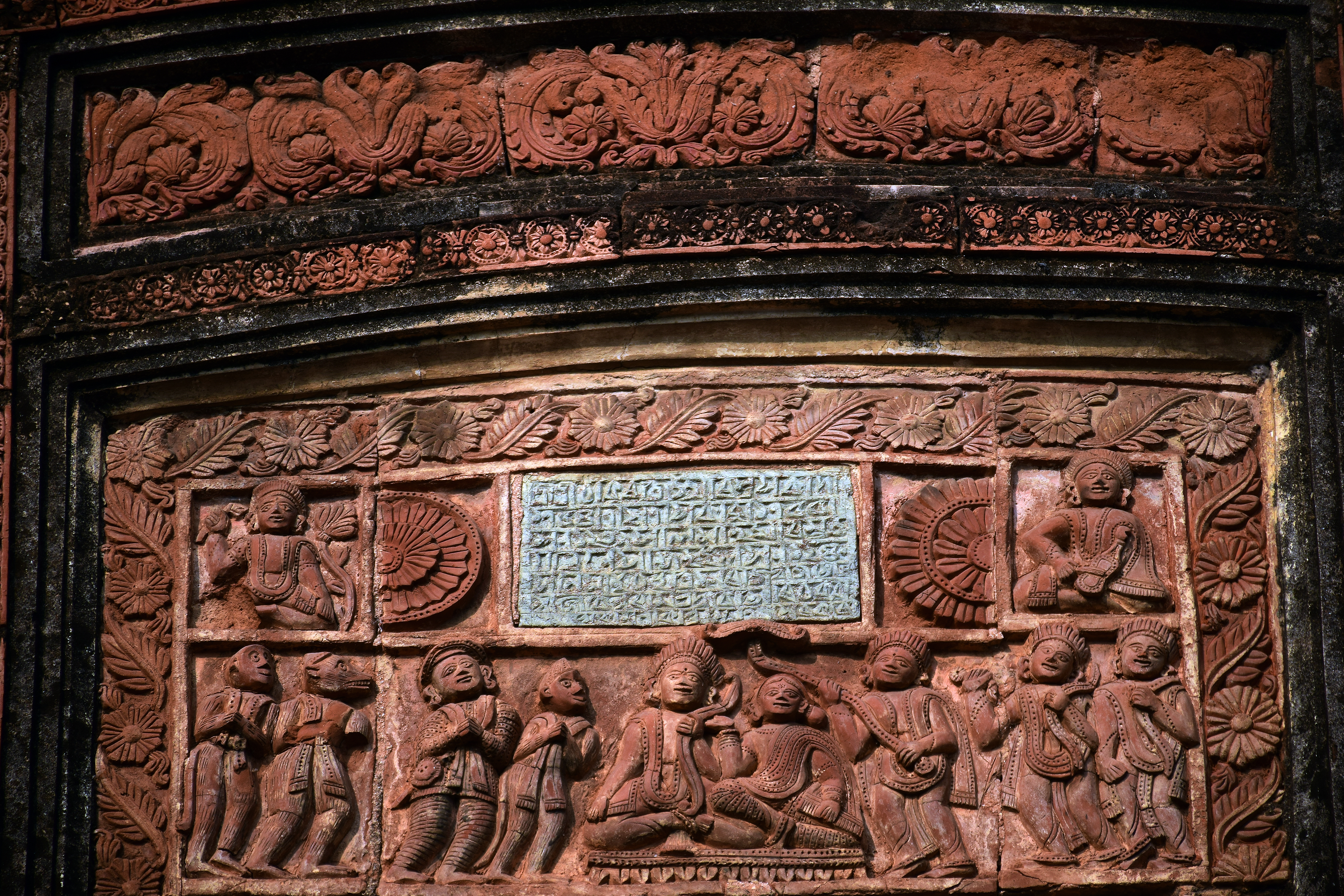
The upper part of central terracotta plaque contains figures of Rama and Sita with foundation plaque.

At the two corners of the cornice at the top of the temple arch are carved scenes of boat journeys, reminding us that Bhadra, like Chand Sadagar at Manasamangal Kāvya, used to boats on the river to trade in distant lands. There are 12 terracotta plaques on the left and 12 on the right and 19 in the middle of the facade of temple with Dashavatara and mythological stories engraved on them.

Social scenarios in the terracotta sculpture are tobacco consumption, spices in Hamandista, worship of Shiva decorated in social episodes and drum player. Sculpture of Dasbhuja Durga in the middle plaque, but the sons and daughters are excluded. Besides, the scenarios of the dancing posture reminds the classical culture in the context of Gaudiya Vaishnavism. The abundance of geometric and floral sculptures can be seen on terracotta plaques of the columns.

The plaques of this temple are found in the art of the two-dimensional human statue painted by Nandalal Bose and Jamini Roy. Also, similarities to the Pattachitra made by patua of Bharatpur, Shushunia.

== Bibliography ==
- Bandyopadhyay, Amiya kumar (February 1971). বাঁকুড়া জেলার পুরাকীর্তি Bām̐kuṛā jēlāra purākīrti [Antiquities of Bankura District] (in Bengali). Public Works Department, Government of West Bengal.
- Dasgupta, R. K (June 1986). Sri Sri Ramakrishna Kathamrita as a religious classic. Bulletin of the Ramakrishna Mission Institute of Culture.
