= Ajit Kumar Saha =

Indian politician

Member of Parliament, Lok Sabha
- In office 1971-1989
- Preceded by: Pashupati Mandal
- Succeeded by: Sukhendu Khan
- Constituency: Vishnupur

Personal details
- Born: 1938 (age 87–88) Salboni Village, Bankura District, Bengal Presidency, British India
- Party: Communist Party of India (Marxist)

Ajit Kumar Saha was an Indian politician. He was elected to the Lok Sabha, lower house of the Parliament of India from Vishnupur, West Bengal as member of the Communist Party of India (Marxist). He was a student of Bankura Christian College.
