= Susmita Bauri =

Indian politician (born 1975)

Member of Parliament for Bishnupur
- In office 2004-2014
- Preceded by: Sandhya Bauri
- Succeeded by: Saumitra Khan

Personal details
- Born: 5 January 1975 (age 51) Khatra, Bankura district
- Party: CPI(M)
- Spouse: Gurucharan Bhattacharya
- Profession: Lawyer

Susmita Bauri (born 5 January 1975) is an Indian politician and had been elected on a CPI(M) ticket from the Bishnupur (Lok Sabha constituency) in the Indian state of West Bengal to the 14th and 15th Lok Sabha.

Daughter of Nimai Charan Bauri and Sandhya Bauri, she is a law graduate or LL.B from Hazra Law College of University of Calcutta. As an advocate she provides free legal aid to poor people, especially illiterate women. She belongs to the Bauri community. Her mother, Sandhya Bauri, was a three-time member of Lok Sabha from the same constituency.

In the 14th Lok Sabha she was a member of the Committee on Social Justice and Empowerment and the Standing Committee on Energy. In the 15th Lok Sabha she was a member of the Committee on Chemicals and Fertilizers and the Committee on Absence of Members from Sitting of the House.
