= Mohammad Hossain =

West Bengal politician

Member of West Bengal Legislative Assembly
- In office 1951–1957
- Preceded by: Constituency established
- Succeeded by: Constituency abolished
- Constituency: Khandaghosh

Personal details
- Born: Khandaghosh, Bardhaman district, Bengal Presidency
- Party: Indian National Congress

Mohammad Hossain is an Indian politician belonging to the Indian National Congress. He was the inaugural MLA of Khandaghosh Assembly constituency in the West Bengal Legislative Assembly.

== Early life and family ==
Hossain was born into a Bengali Muslim family in Khandaghosh, Bardhaman district, Bengal Presidency.

== Career ==
Hossain contested in the 1951 West Bengal Legislative Assembly election where he ran as an Indian National Congress candidate for Khandaghosh Assembly constituency.
