= Arup Kumar Khan =

Indian politician

Member of West Bengal Legislative Assembly
- In office 2011–2021
- Preceded by: Tarapada Chakrabarti
- Succeeded by: Amarnath Shakha
- Constituency: Onda

Personal details
- Party: All India Trinamool Congress

Arup Kumar Khan is an Indian politician. He was elected as MLA of Onda Vidhan Sabha Constituency in 2011 and 2016 in West Bengal Legislative Assembly. He is an All India Trinamool Congress politician.
