= Sandhya Bauri =

Indian politician and social worker

Member of parliament, Lok Sabha
- In office 1996–2004
- Constituency: Vishnupur

Personal details
- Born: 2 September 1951 (age 74)
- Party: Communist Party of India (Marxist)
- Spouse: Nimai Charan Bauri
- Profession: Politician, Social worker, Agriculturist

Sandhya Bauri (born 2 September 1951) is a political and social worker and a Member of Parliament elected from the Vishnupur constituency in the Indian state of West Bengal being a Communist Party of India (Marxist) candidate.

== Early life ==
Sandhya was born on 2 September 1951 in Khatra, district Bankura (West Bengal). She married Shri Nimai Charan Bauri on 28 February 1972. She has four daughters. One of her daughters, Susmita Bauri, was also a member of parliament.

== Education & career ==
Sandhya is an undergraduate and studied at Bankura Christian College, Bankura (West Bengal).

She was first elected to the 11th Lok Sabha in 1996. From 1996 to 1997, she served as

- Member, Committee on Food, Civil Supplies and Public Distribution
- Member, Committee on the Empowerment of Women
- Member, Consultative Committee, Ministry of Welfare

She was elected to the 13th Lok Sabha for a 3rd term in 1999. During 1999–2004, she served as

- Member, Committee on Labour and Welfare
- Member, Consultative Committee, Ministry of Textiles

== Special interests & social activities ==
She has worked for women and child development and support of the poor and the lower castes. She has also organized and staged dramas for children. She enjoys reading, writing and playing games during her leisure time. She also plays indoor games like carom and table tennis.
