= Nabin Chandra Bag =

Indian politician

Member of the West Bengal Legislative Assembly
- Incumbent
- Assumed office 2011
- Preceded by: Prasanta Majhi
- Constituency: Khandaghosh

Personal details
- Party: AITC (until 2026); Democratic Trinamool Congress (from 2026)
- Profession: Politician

Nabin Chandra Bag is an Indian politician, member of Democratic Trinamool Congress. He is an MLA, elected from the Khandaghosh constituency in the 2011 West Bengal Legislative Assembly election as a Communist Party of India (Marxist) candidate. He left the party and joined Trinamool Congress in 2015. In 2016 and 2021 assembly election he was re-elected from the same constituency.
