= Lakshmi Kanta Majumdar =

Indian politician (born 1976)

Lakshmi Kanta Majumdar (born 1976) is an Indian politician from West Bengal. He is a member of West Bengal Legislative Assembly from the Katulpur Assembly constituency, which is reserved for Scheduled Caste community, in Bankura district representing the Bharatiya Janata Party.

== Early life and education ==
Majumdar is from Katulpur, Bankura district, West Bengal. He is the son of the late Debendra Nath Majumdar. He completed his Bachelor of Physical Education at University of Burdwan in 1999. He works as an Assistant Teacher at Ramnagar Atul High School, Khanakul. He declared assets worth Rs.54 lakhs in his affidavit to the Election Commission of India.

== Career ==
Majumdar won the Katulpur Assembly constituency representing the Bharatiya Janata Party in the 2026 West Bengal Legislative Assembly election. He polled 1,26,241 votes and defeated his nearest rival, Harakali Protiher of the All India Trinamool Congress (AITC), by a margin of 34,367 votes.
