= Amarnath Shakha =

Indian politician

Member of the West Bengal Legislative Assembly
- In office 2 May 2021 – Incumbent
- Preceded by: Arup Kumar Khan
- Constituency: Onda

Personal details
- Party: Bharatiya Janata Party
- Education: 10th Pass
- Profession: Cultivation

Amarnath Shakha is an Indian politician from Bharatiya Janata Party. In May 2021, he was elected as a member of the West Bengal Legislative Assembly from Onda (constituency). He defeated Arup Kumar Khan of All India Trinamool Congress by 11,551 votes in 2021 West Bengal Assembly election.
