= Onda Assembly constituency =

Onda
- Constituency No. 254 for the West Bengal Legislative Assembly
- Interactive Map Outlining Onda Assembly Constituency

Constituency details
- Country: India
- Region: East India
- State: West Bengal
- District: Bankura
- Lok Sabha constituency: Bishnupur
- Established: 1957
- Total electors: 199,396
- Reservation: None

Member of Legislative Assembly
- 18th West Bengal Legislative Assembly
- Incumbent Amarnath Shakha
- Party: BJP
- Alliance: NDA
- Elected year: 2026

Onda Assembly constituency is an assembly constituency in Bankura district in the Indian state of West Bengal.

== Overview ==
As per orders of the Delimitation Commission, No. 254 Onda Assembly constituency is composed of the following: Onda community development block; and Bikna, Kosthia, Narrah and Sanbandha gram panchayats of Bankura II community development block.

Onda Assembly constituency is part of No. 37 Bishnupur Lok Sabha constituency.

== Members of the Legislative Assembly ==
Year	Members	Party
1957	Gokul Behari Das	Indian National Congress
1957	Ashutosh Mullick	Indian National Congress
1962	Gokul Behari Das	Indian National Congress
1967	S Dutta	Indian National Congress
1969	Anil Kumar Mukherjee	All India Forward Bloc
1971	Manik Dutta	Communist Party of India
1972	Shambhu Narayan Goswami	Indian National Congress
1977	Anil Kumar Mukherjee	All India Forward Bloc
1982	Anil Kumar Mukherjee	All India Forward Bloc
1987	Anil Kumar Mukherjee	All India Forward Bloc
1991	Anil Kumar Mukherjee	All India Forward Bloc
1996	Anil Kumar Mukherjee	All India Forward Bloc
2001	Anil Kumar Mukherjee	All India Forward Bloc
2006	Tarapada Chakraborty	All India Forward Bloc
2011	Arup Kumar Khan	Trinamool Congress
2016	Arup Kumar Khan	Trinamool Congress
2021	Amarnath Shakha	Bharatiya Janata Party
2026	Amarnath Shakha	Bharatiya Janata Party

== Election results ==
=== 2026 ===
2026 West Bengal Legislative Assembly election: Onda
Party	Candidate	Votes	%	±%
BJP	Amarnath Shakha	128,296	52.09	▲5.61
AITC	Subrata Dutta	96,573	39.21	▼2.16
AIFB	Asit Sharma	9,702	3.94	▼2.98
SUCI(C)	Magaram Ghosh	3,389	1.38	
NOTA	None of the above	3,963	1.61	▼0.55
Majority		31,723	12.88	▲7.77
Turnout		246,292	93.61	▲5.73
BJP hold		Swing		

=== 2021 ===
2021 West Bengal Legislative Assembly election: Onda
Party	Candidate	Votes	%	±%
BJP	Amarnath Shakha	104,940	46.48	
AITC	Arup Kumar Khan	93,389	41.37	
AIFB	Tarapada Chakraborty	15,613	6.92	
Independent	Krishna Chandra Bauri	3,439	1.52	
NOTA	None of the above	4,879	2.16	
Majority		11,551	5.11	
Turnout		225,759	87.88	
BJP gain from AITC		Swing		

=== 2016 ===
2016 West Bengal Legislative Assembly election: Onda
Party	Candidate	Votes	%	±%
AITC	Arup Kumar Khan	80,603	40.70	▼2.80
AIFB	Manik Mukherjee	69,755	35.23	▼7.93
BJP	Amarnath Shakha	27,417	13.85	▲8.07
Independent	Ashok Chattopadhyay	6,158	3.11	
BSP	Sadhan Chattaraj	5,015	2.53	▲0.69
NOTA	None of the above	4,489	2.27	
SUCI(C)	Sabiruddin Bhuina	3,042	1.54	
CPI(ML)L	Baidyanath China	1,539	0.78	▼1.66
Majority		10,848	5.47	▲5.13
Turnout		1,98,018	86.63	▼0.63
AITC hold		Swing		

=== 2011 ===
2011 West Bengal Legislative Assembly election: Onda
Party	Candidate	Votes	%	±%
AITC	Arup Kumar Khan	75,699	43.50	▲11.03
AIFB	Tarapada Chakraborty	75,103	43.16	▼17.10
BJP	Amarnath Shakha	10,056	5.78	
CPI(ML)L	Baidyanath China	4,245	2.44	
BSP	Amitava Dey	3,201	1.84	
JMM	Abdul Hai Mallick	2,141	1.23	
JVM(P)	Abdul Samid Mandal	1,787	1.03	
JDP	Dilip Murmu	1,783	1.02	
Majority		596	0.34	
Turnout		1,74,015	87.27	
AITC gain from AIFB		Swing	28.13	

.# Swing calculated on Congress+Trinamool Congress vote percentages taken together in 2006.

=== 2006 ===
In the 2006 state assembly elections, Tarapada Chakrabarti of Forward Bloc won the Onda assembly seat defeating his nearest rival Abeda Bibi Sk of Trinamool Congress. Contests in most years were multi cornered but only the winner and runners are being mentioned. Anil Mukherjee of Forward Bloc defeated Sk. Sajahan of Congress in 2001, Arup Khan of Congress in 1996, Sambhu Narayan Goswami of Congress in 1991, Tapan Banerjee of Congress in 1987 and Sambhu Narayan Goswami of Congress in 1982 and 1977.

=== 1972 ===
Sambhu Narayan Goswami of Congress won in 1972. Manik Dutta of CPI(M) won in 1971. Anil Kumar Mukherjee of Forward Block won in 1969. S.Dutta of Congress won in 1967. Gokul Behari Das of Congress won in 1962. Onda dual seat was won by Gokul Behari Das and Ashutosh Mallick, both of Congress, in 1957. The Onda seat did not exist prior to that.
