= Bishnupur Lok Sabha constituency =

Lok Sabha constituency in West Bengal

Coordinates: 23°05′N 87°19′E

Bishnupur WB-37
- Lok Sabha constituency
- Interactive Map Outlining Bishnupur Lok Sabha Constituency

Constituency details
- Country: India
- Region: East India
- State: West Bengal
- Assembly constituencies: Barjora; Onda; Bishnupur; Katulpur; Indas; Sonamukhi; Khandaghosh
- Established: 1962
- Total electors: 17,54,268
- Reservation: SC

Member of Parliament
- 18th Lok Sabha
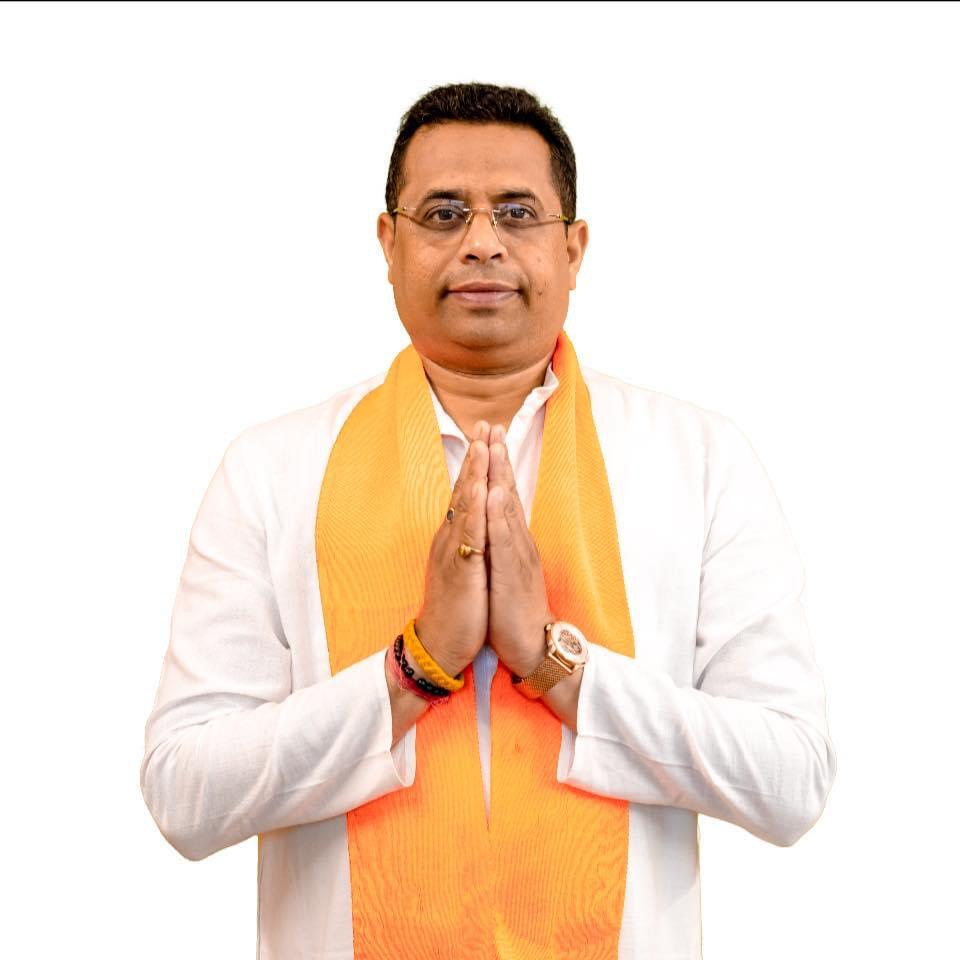
- Incumbent Saumitra Khan
- Party: BJP
- Alliance: NDA
- Elected year: 2024

Bishnupur Lok Sabha constituency is one of the 543 parliamentary constituencies in India. The constituency centres on Bishnupur in West Bengal. While six of the assembly seats of Bishnupur Lok Sabha constituency are in Bankura district, one assembly segment is in Purba Bardhaman district. The seat is reserved for scheduled castes.

== Assembly segments ==
Parliamentary constituencies in West Bengal - 1. Cooch Behar, 2. Alipurduars, 3. Jalpaiguri, 4. Darjeeling, 5. Raiganj, 6. Balurghat, 7. Maldaha Uttar, 8. Maldaha Dakshin, 9. Jangipur, 10. Baharampur, 11. Murshidabad, 12. Krishnanagar, 13. Ranaghat, 14. Bangaon, 15. Barrackpore, 16. Dum Dum, 17. Barasat, 18. Basirhat, 19. Jaynagar, 20. Mathurapur, 21. Diamond Harbour, 22. Jadavpur, 23. Kolkata Dakshin, 24. Kolkata Uttar, 25. Howrah, 26. Uluberia, 27. Serampore, 28. Hooghly, 29. Arambagh, 30. Tamluk, 31, Kanthi, 32. Ghatal, 33. Jhargram, 34. Medinipur, 35. Purulia, 36. Bankura, 37. Bishnupur, 38. Bardhaman Purba, 39. Bardhaman Durgapur, 40. Asansol, 41. Bolpur, 42. Birbhum

As per order of the Delimitation Commission issued in 2006 in respect of the delimitation of constituencies in the West Bengal, parliamentary constituency no. 37 Bishnupur (SC) is composed of the following segments:

#	Name	District	Member	Party	2024 Lead
253	Barjora	Bankura	Billeswar Sinha	BJP	BJP
254	Onda	Bankura	Amarnath Shakha	BJP	BJP
255	Bishnupur	Bankura	Shukla Chatterjee	BJP	BJP
256	Katulpur (SC)	Bankura	Lakshmi Kanta Majumdar	BJP	BJP
257	Indas (SC)	Bankura	Nirmal Kumar Dhara	BJP	AITC
258	Sonamukhi (SC)	Bankura	Dibakar Gharami	BJP	BJP
259	Khandaghosh (SC)	Purba Bardhaman	Nabin Chandra Bag	AITC	AITC

Prior to delimitation, Vishnupur Lok Sabha constituency was composed of the following assembly segments:Taldangra (assembly constituency no. 244), Raipur (ST) (assembly constituency no. 245), Ranibandh (ST) (assembly constituency no. 246), Indpur (SC) (assembly constituency no. 247), Vishnupur (assembly constituency no. 253), Kotulpur (assembly constituency no. 254) and Indas (SC) (assembly constituency no. 255).

== Members of Parliament ==
Year	Member	Party
1962	Pashupati Mandal	Indian National Congress
1967	Pashupati Mandal	Indian National Congress
1971	Ajit Kumar Saha	Communist Party of India (Marxist)
1977	Ajit Kumar Saha	Communist Party of India (Marxist)
1980	Ajit Kumar Saha	Communist Party of India (Marxist)
1984	Ajit Kumar Saha	Communist Party of India (Marxist)
1989	Sukhendu Khan	Communist Party of India (Marxist)
1991	Sukhendu Khan	Communist Party of India (Marxist)
1996	Sandhya Bauri	Communist Party of India (Marxist)
1998	Sandhya Bauri	Communist Party of India (Marxist)
1999	Sandhya Bauri	Communist Party of India (Marxist)
2004	Susmita Bauri	Communist Party of India (Marxist)
2009	Susmita Bauri	Communist Party of India (Marxist)
2014	Saumitra Khan	Trinamool Congress
2019	Saumitra Khan	Bharatiya Janata Party
2024	Saumitra Khan	Bharatiya Janata Party

== Election results ==
Vote share of Winning candidates
2024	44.93%
2019	46.25%
2014	45.51%
2009	51.92%
2004	64.28%
1999	57.89%
1998	56.79%
1996	58.14%
1991	58.57%
1989	59.78%
1984	54.77%
1980	58.27%
1977	67.30%
1971	33.29%
1967	49.12%
1962	52.94%

=== 2024 ===
2024 Indian general election: Bishnupur
Party	Candidate	Votes	%	±%
BJP	Saumitra Khan	680,130	44.93	▼1.32
AITC	Sujata Mondal	674,563	44.56	▲3.81
CPI(M)	Sital Chandra Kaibartya	105,411	6.96	▼0.26
NOTA	None of the Above	19,132	1.26	▲0.24
SUCI(C)	Sadananda Mandal	16,074	1.06	▲0.27
BSP	Joydev Dhank	9,079	0.60	
IND	Basudeb Sikari	5,106	0.34	
IND	Narendranath Ray	4,377	0.29	
Majority		5,567	0.37	▼5.13
Turnout		1,513,872	86.30	▼1.04
BJP hold		Swing		

=== 2019 ===
2019 Indian general election: Bishnupur
Party	Candidate	Votes	%	±%
BJP	Saumitra Khan	657,019	46.25	▲32.14
AITC	Shyamal Santra	578,972	40.75	▼4.76
CPI(M)	Sunil Khan	102,615	7.22	▼26.52
INC	Narayan Chandra Khan	17,932	1.26	▼0.87
NOTA	None of the Above	14,436	1.02	▼0.63
BMP	Basudeb Sikari	13,545	0.95	▲0.34
SUCI(C)	Ajit Kumar Bauri	11,225	0.79	▲0.41
IND	Tarani Roy	11,070	0.78	
IND	Sanjit Khan	7,396	0.52	
CPI(ML) Red Star	Jitendra Nath Roy	6,438	0.45	
Majority		78,047	5.50	▼6.27
Turnout		1,421,191	87.34	▲0.62
BJP gain from AITC		Swing		

=== 2014 ===
2014 Indian general election: Bishnupur
Party	Candidate	Votes	%	±%
AITC	Saumitra Khan	578,870	45.51	▲6.46
CPI(M)	Susmita Bauri	429,185	33.74	▼18.18
BJP	Jayanta Mondal	179,530	14.11	▲10.14
INC	Narayan Chandra Khan	27,054	2.13	
NOTA	None of the Above	20,928	1.65	
BMP	Joydeb Bauri	7,816	0.61	
IND	Tarani Roy	6,854	0.54	
IND	Dinesh Lohar	6,820	0.54	
SUCI(C)	Sadananda Mandal	4,886	0.38	
BSP	Jagadananda Roy	10,127	0.80	▼0.03
Majority		149,685	11.77	▼0.50
Turnout		1,272,070	86.72	▲1.56
AITC gain from CPI(M)		Swing		

=== 2009 ===
General Election, 2009: Bishnupur
Party	Candidate	Votes	%	±%
CPI(M)	Susmita Bauri	541,075	51.92	▼12.36
AITC	Seuli Saha	411,709	39.05	▲15.91
BJP	Jayanta Mondal	41,908	3.97	N/A
JMM	Tapas Das	21,634	2.02	N/A
IND	Uma Kanta Bhakat	17,727	1.68	N/A
IND	Uttam Bouri	11,280	1.07	N/A
BSP	Manik Bauri	8,816	0.83	▼0.48
Majority		129,366	12.27	▼28.87
Turnout		1,054,188	85.16	
CPI(M) hold		Swing	-12.96	

=== 2004 ===
General Election, 2004: Bishnupur
Party	Candidate	Votes	%	±%
CPI(M)	Susmita Bauri	518,507	64.28	▲6.39
AITC	Janardan Saha	186,678	23.14	▼12.99
INC	Achintya Majhi	61,793	7.66	▲4.16
IND	Sraban Mondal	29,009	3.59	
BSP	Ajoy Bauri	10,637	1.31	
Majority		3,31,829	41.14	▲19.38
Turnout		8,06,624		
CPI(M) hold		Swing		

=== 1999 ===
1999 Indian general election: Vishnupur (SC)
Party	Candidate	Votes	%	±%
CPI(M)	Sandhya Bauri	483,084	57.89	▲1.10
AITC	Adhibas Duley	301,514	36.13	▼0.15
INC	Mallika Mandal	29,237	3.50	
JKP(N)	Saha Ajit	17,109	2.05	▼1.71
IND	Bahadur Duley	3,558	0.43	
Majority		181,570	21.76	▲1.25
Turnout		846,339	78.96	▼2.10
CPI(M) hold		Swing		

=== 1998 ===
1998 Indian general election: Vishnupur (SC)
Party	Candidate	Votes	%	±%
CPI(M)	Sandhya Bauri	479,727	56.79	▼1.35
AITC	Purnima Lohar	306,486	36.28	
JKP(N)	Ajit Saha	31,723	3.76	
JMM	Banshi Badan Dule	25,074	2.97	
IND	Kamal Duley	1,796	0.21	
Majority		173,241	20.51	▼11.64
Turnout		862,530	81.06	▼3.07
CPI(M) hold		Swing		

=== 1996 ===
1996 Indian general election: Vishnupur (SC)
Party	Candidate	Votes	%	±%
CPI(M)	Sandhya Bauri	480,777	58.14	▼0.43
INC	Ashis Rajak	214,931	25.99	▼6.19
BJP	Pravakar Mondal	79,357	9.60	▲1.48
IND	Prasanta Mallik	29,763	3.60	
IND	Aswini Duley	19,037	2.30	
IND	Ranjit Namata	3,100	0.37	
Majority		265,846	32.15	▲5.76
Turnout		851,257	84.13	▲5.14
CPI(M) hold		Swing		

=== 1991 ===
1991 Indian general election: Vishnupur (SC)
Party	Candidate	Votes	%	±%
CPI(M)	Sukhendu Khan	422,385	58.57	▼1.21
INC	Sadhan Majhi	232,112	32.18	▼2.02
BJP	Provakar Mondal	58,555	8.12	
IND	Gadadhar Duley	6,185	0.86	
DDP	Rabindra Nath Bag	1,974	0.27	▲0.16
Majority		190,273	26.39	▲0.81
Turnout		738,614	78.99	▼3.13
CPI(M) hold		Swing		

=== 1989 ===
1989 Indian general election: Vishnupur (SC)
Party	Candidate	Votes	%	±%
CPI(M)	Sukhendu Khan	438,322	59.78	▲5.01
INC	Jayanta Kumar Mallick	250,733	34.20	▼7.97
JKD	Ajit Saha	38,529	5.26	
AMB	Mahadeb Mandal	4,798	0.65	
DDP	Shyamapada Bag	788	0.11	
Majority		187,589	25.58	▲12.98
Turnout		744,882	82.12	▲1.62
CPI(M) hold		Swing		

=== 1984 ===
1984 Indian general election: Vishnupur (SC)
Party	Candidate	Votes	%	±%
CPI(M)	Ajit Kumar Saha	328,580	54.77	▼3.50
INC	Gourandra Cha Lohar	252,940	42.17	▲5.36
IND	Amulya Ahir	11,259	1.88	
IND	Mondal Mahadeb	3,608	0.60	
IND	Bhagbat Duley	3,488	0.58	
Majority		75,640	12.60	▼8.86
Turnout		613,196	80.50	▲4.32
CPI(M) hold		Swing		

=== 1980 ===
1980 Indian general election: Vishnupur (SC)
Party	Candidate	Votes	%	±%
CPI(M)	Ajit Kumar Saha	299,289	58.27	▼9.03
INC(I)	Tulsi Das Mandal	189,089	36.81	▲5.42
JKD	Aswini Kumar Malik	12,055	2.35	
JP	Madan Mohan Mallick	9,755	1.90	
JP(S)	Saha Shila	3,432	0.67	
Majority		110,200	21.46	▼14.45
Turnout		527,721	76.18	▲13.58
CPI(M) hold		Swing		

=== 1977 ===
1977 Indian general election: Vishnupur (SC)
Party	Candidate	Votes	%	±%
CPI(M)	Ajit Kumar Saha	244,370	67.30	▲34.01
INC	Gour Chandra Lohar	113,996	31.39	▼1.07
IND	Pashupati Mondal	4,737	1.30	
Majority		130,374	35.91	▲35.08
Turnout		376,332	62.60	▲3.46
CPI(M) hold		Swing		

=== 1971 ===
1971 Indian general election: Vishnupur (SC)
Party	Candidate	Votes	%	±%
CPI(M)	Ajit Kumar Saha	98,438	33.29	▲21.52
INC	Khan Guru Pada	95,978	32.46	▼16.66
BAC	Krishna Chandra Duley	42,553	14.39	▼21.06
CPI	Indrajit Tangi	40,053	13.54	
INC(O)	Dr. Pashupati Mandal	18,704	6.32	
Majority		2,460	0.83	▼12.84
Turnout		316,885	59.14	▼1.44
CPI(M) gain from INC		Swing		

=== 1967 ===
1967 Indian general election: Vishnupur (SC)
Party	Candidate	Votes	%	±%
INC	Pashupati Mandal	148,024	49.12	▼3.82
BAC	M. M. Mallick	106,834	35.45	
CPI(M)	R. P. Dhibar	35,481	11.77	
ABJS	C. Sahana	10,986	3.65	
Majority		41,190	13.67	▼11.73
Turnout		315,034	60.58	▲14.95
INC hold		Swing		

=== 1962 ===
1962 Indian general election: Vishnupur (SC)
Party	Candidate	Votes	%	±%
INC	Pashupati Mandal	108,908	52.94	
CPI	Biswanath Bauri	56,657	27.54	
HM	Bagala Prasad Mondal	35,232	17.13	
IND	Satish Saha Show Mondal	4,921	2.39	
Majority		52,251	25.40	
Turnout		214,661	45.63	
INC win (new seat)				

== See also ==
- List of constituencies of the Lok Sabha
