= Katulpur Assembly constituency =

Katulpur
- Constituency No. 256 for the West Bengal Legislative Assembly
- Interactive Map Outlining Katulpur Assembly Constituency

Constituency details
- Country: India
- Region: East India
- State: West Bengal
- District: Bankura
- Lok Sabha constituency: Bishnupur
- Established: 1957
- Total electors: 189,915
- Reservation: SC

Member of Legislative Assembly
- 18th West Bengal Legislative Assembly
- Incumbent Lakshmi Kanta Majumdar
- Party: BJP
- Alliance: NDA
- Elected year: 2026

Katulpur Assembly constituency is an assembly constituency in Bankura district in the Indian state of West Bengal. It is reserved for scheduled castes.

== Overview ==
As per orders of the Delimitation Commission, No. 256 Katulpur Assembly constituency (SC) is composed of the following: Deshra-koyalpara, Gopinathpur, Kotulpur, Lego, Mirzapur and Sihar gram panchayats of Kotulpur community development block; Gelia, Jagannathpur, Kuchiakol, Maynapur, Salda, Uttarbarh, Hetia, Routkhanda and Shyamnagar gram panchayats of Joypur community development block.

Katulpur Assembly constituency is part of No. 37 Bishnupur Lok Sabha constituency.

== Members of the Legislative Assembly ==
Year	Name	Party
1957	Jagannath Kolay	Indian National Congress
1962	Jagannath Kolay	Indian National Congress
1967	S. Sarkar	Bangla Congress
1969	Niranjan Bhadra	Bangla Congress
1971	Jatadhari Mukhopadhyay	Communist Party of India (Marxist)
1972	Akshay Kumar Kolay	Indian National Congress
1977	Gunadhar Choudhury	Communist Party of India (Marxist)
1982	Gunadhar Choudhury	Communist Party of India (Marxist)
1987	Gouripada Dutta	Communist Party of India (Marxist)
1991	Gouripada Dutta	Communist Party of India (Marxist)
1996	Gouripada Dutta	Communist Party of India (Marxist)
2001	Manashi Ghose	Communist Party of India (Marxist)
2006	Kalpana Koley	Communist Party of India (Marxist)
2011	Saumitra Khan	Indian National Congress
2014^	Shyamal Santra	Trinamool Congress
2016	Shyamal Santra	Trinamool Congress
2021	Harakali Protiher (Note: Harakali Protiher was elected as a BJP MLA. However, on 27 October 2023, he defected to the Trinamool Congress)	Bharatiya Janata Party
2021	Harakali Protiher	Trinamool Congress
2026	Lakshmi Kanta Majumdar	Bharatiya Janata Party

- ^ by-election

== Election results ==
=== 2026 ===
2026 West Bengal Legislative Assembly election: Katulpur
Party	Candidate	Votes	%	±%
BJP	Lakshmi Kanta Majumdar	126,241	52.55	+5.24
AITC	Harakali Protiher	91,874	38.24	−3.81
CPI(M)	Ramchandra Roy	13,380	5.57	
INC	Sumitra Mallik Santra	2,890	1.2	−6.72
SUCI(C)	Mohan Santra	2,192	0.91	
NOTA	None of the above	1,662	0.69	−0.14
Majority		34,367	14.31	+9.05
Turnout		240,253	94.44	+3.62
BJP hold		Swing		

=== 2021 ===
2021 West Bengal Legislative Assembly election: Katulpur
Party	Candidate	Votes	%	±%
BJP	Harakali Protiher (Note: Harakali Protiher was elected as BJP MLA. However, on 27 October 2023 he defected to the Trinamool Congress.)	106,022	47.31	
AITC	Sangeeta Malik	94,237	42.05	
INC	Akshay Santra	17,757	7.92	
BSP	Haru Roy	2,519	1.12	
NOTA	None of the above	1,856	0.83	
Majority		11,785	5.26	
Turnout		224,123	90.82	
BJP gain from AITC		Swing		

=== 2016 ===
2016 West Bengal Legislative Assembly election: Katulpur
Party	Candidate	Votes	%	±%
AITC	Shyamal Santra	98,901	49.03	▼3.61
INC	Akshay Santra	77,653	38.50	▲34.55
BJP	Tarun Kumar Kotal	19,255	9.55	▼2.71
NOTA	None of the Above	3,470	1.72	▲0.13
Majority		21,248	10.53	▼10.96
Turnout		2,01,712	90.66	▼0.67
AITC hold		Swing		

=== 2014 bypoll ===
The bypoll was necessitated after sitting MLA of Congress Saumitra Khan switched to the Trinamool Congress & was elected as MP of Bishnupur Lok Sabha constituency.

West Bengal Legislative Assembly by-election, 2014: Katulpur
Party	Candidate	Votes	%	±%
AITC	Shyamal Santra	98,878	52.64	New
CPI(M)	Sital Kaibartya	58,521	31.15	▼15.44
BJP	Lakshmi Kanta Majumdar	23,037	12.26	▲8.75
INC	Akshay Santra	7,419	3.95	▼43.45
NOTA	None of the Above	3,043	1.59	New
Majority		40,357	21.49	▲20.68
Turnout		1,91,051	89.99	▼2.6
AITC gain from INC		Swing		

=== 2011 ===
2011 West Bengal Legislative Assembly election: Katulpur
Party	Candidate	Votes	%	±%
INC	Saumitra Khan	83,355	47.40	
CPI(M)	Purnima Bagdi	81,922	46.59	
BJP	Tarun Kumar Kotal	6,180	3.51	
SUCI(C)	Mohan Santra	4,389	2.50	
Majority		1,433	0.81	
Turnout		1,75,846	92.59	
INC gain from CPI(M)		Swing		

=== 2006 ===
In the 2006 state assembly elections, Kalpana Koley of CPI(M) won the Katulpur assembly seat defeating her nearest rival Aloka Sen Majumdar of Trinamool Congress. Contests in most years were multi cornered but only winners and runners are being mentioned. Manashi Ghose of CPI(M) defeated Sunil Das of Trinamool Congress in 2001. Gouripada Dutta of CPI(M) defeated Nikhil Bose of Congress in 1996, Akshay Kumar Koley of Congress in 1991, and Bablu Kolay of Congress in 1987. Gunadhar Choudhury of CPI(M) defeated Aksay Kumar Koley of Congress in 1982 and 1977.

=== 1972 ===
Akshay Kumar Kolay of Congress won in 1972. Jatadhari Mukhopadhyay of CPI(M) won in 1971, Niranjan Bhadra of Bangla Congress won in 1969. S.Sarkar of Bangla Congress won in 1967. Jagannath Kolay of Congress won in 1962 and 1957. Prior to that the Katulpur seat was not there.
