= Shyamal Santra =

Indian politician

Member of West Bengal Legislative Assembly
- In office 2014–2021
- Preceded by: Saumitra Khan
- Succeeded by: Harakali Protiher
- Constituency: Katulpur

Personal details
- Born: Diha, Bankura
- Party: All India Trinamool Congress
- Spouse: Pritikana Santra
- Children: Antarip Santra

Shyamal Santra is an Indian politician. He was elected to the West Bengal Legislative Assembly from Katulpur in 2014 and 2016.
