= Maynapur =

- Village
- Location in West Bengal, India Maynapur (India)
- Coordinates: 23.0144°N 87.4917°E
- Country: India
- State: West Bengal
- District: Bankura

Population (2011)
  - Total: 5,256

Languages
  - Official: Bengali, English
- Time zone: UTC+5:30 (IST)
- PIN: 722138
- Telephone/STD code: 03244
- Lok Sabha constituency: Bishnupur
- Vidhan Sabha constituency: Katulpur
- Website: bankura.gov.in

Maynapur is a village and a gram panchayat in the Joypur CD block in the Bishnupur subdivision of the Bankura district in the state of West Bengal, India.

== History ==
According to Binoy Ghosh, various claims about Maynapur's links with Lau Sen and Ramai Pandit, of ‘Sunya Puran’ fame, are merely mythological speculation when many historians have doubts about their existence. Maynapur was an ancient cultural centre of Mallabhum. The discovery of images of Buddha has only given rise to some new thinking, but the place is deeply rooted in the Dharmathakur-based culture of the region. The Hakanda temple is an important landmark in the village.

== Geography ==
Places in Bishnupur subdivision in Bankura district
M: Municipal town, CT: census town, R: rural/ urban centre, T: ancient/ temple centre
Owing to space constraints in the small map, the actual locations in a larger map may vary slightly

=== Location ===
Maynapur is located at 23.0144°N 87.4917°E.

Note: The map alongside presents some of the notable locations in the subdivision. All places marked in the map are linked in the larger full screen map.

== Culture ==
David J. McCutchion mentions that the Damodara temple built in 1845 has a terracotta façade and the Hakanda temple as a plain laterite structure.

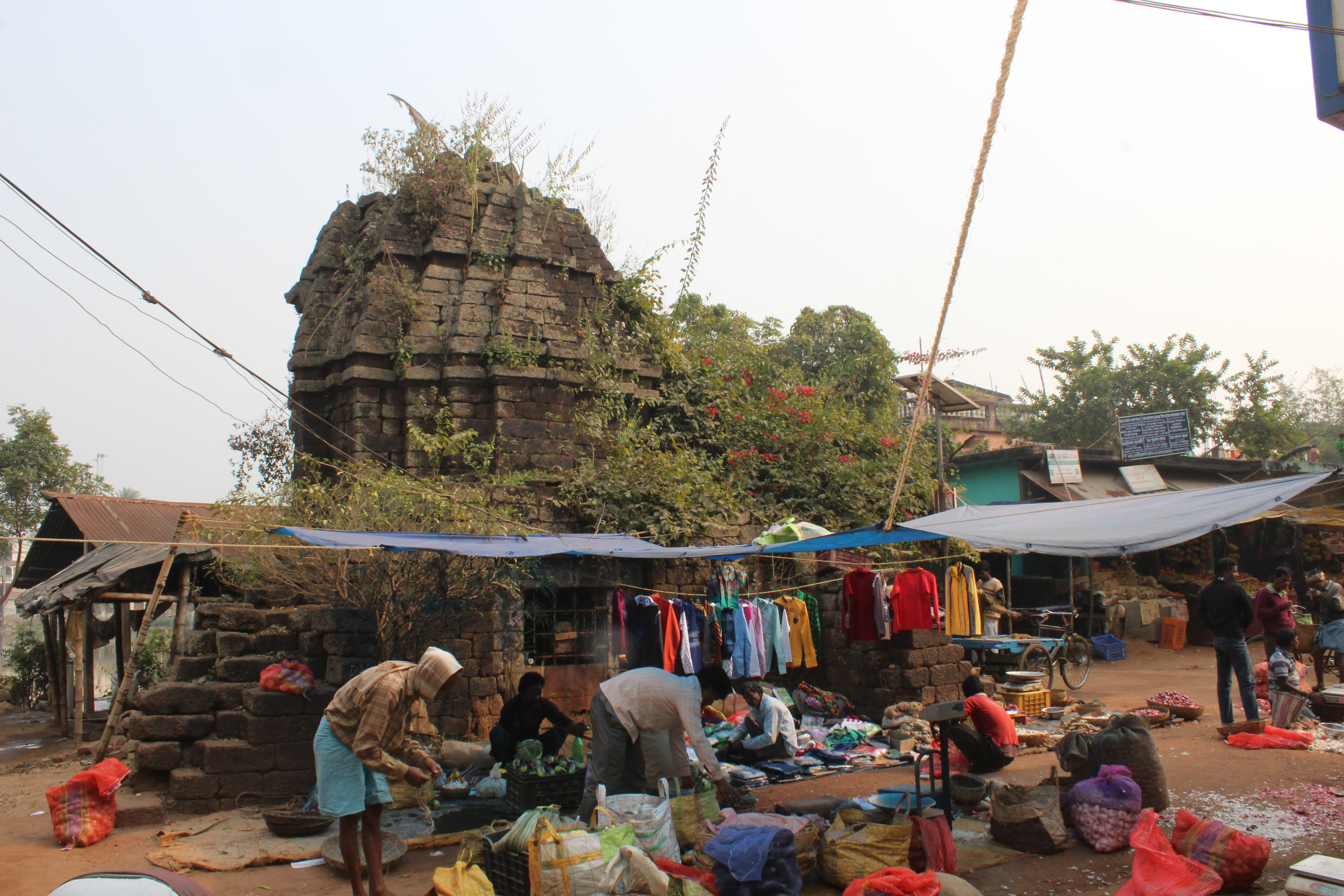
Hakanda temple in Maynapur

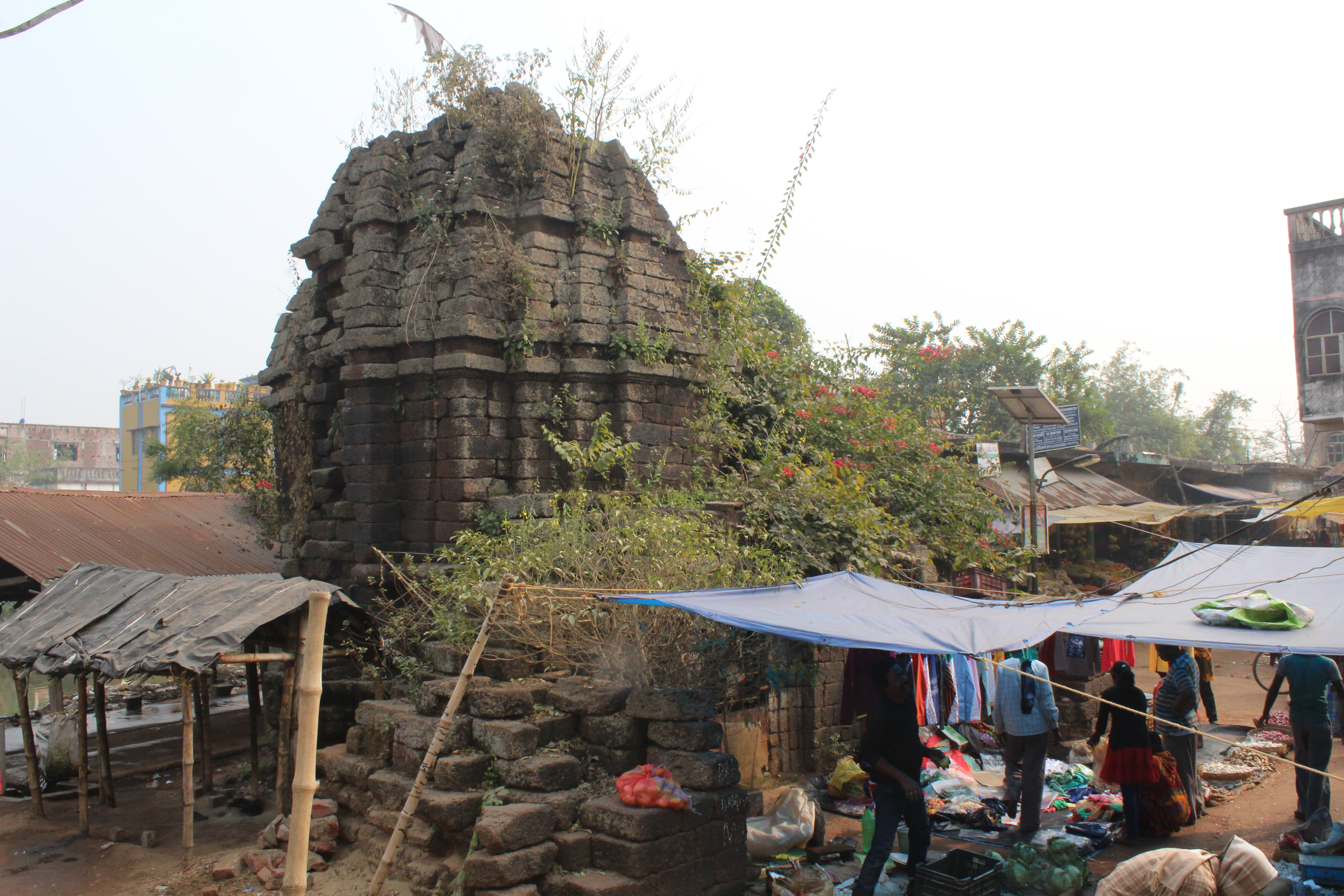
Hakanda temple

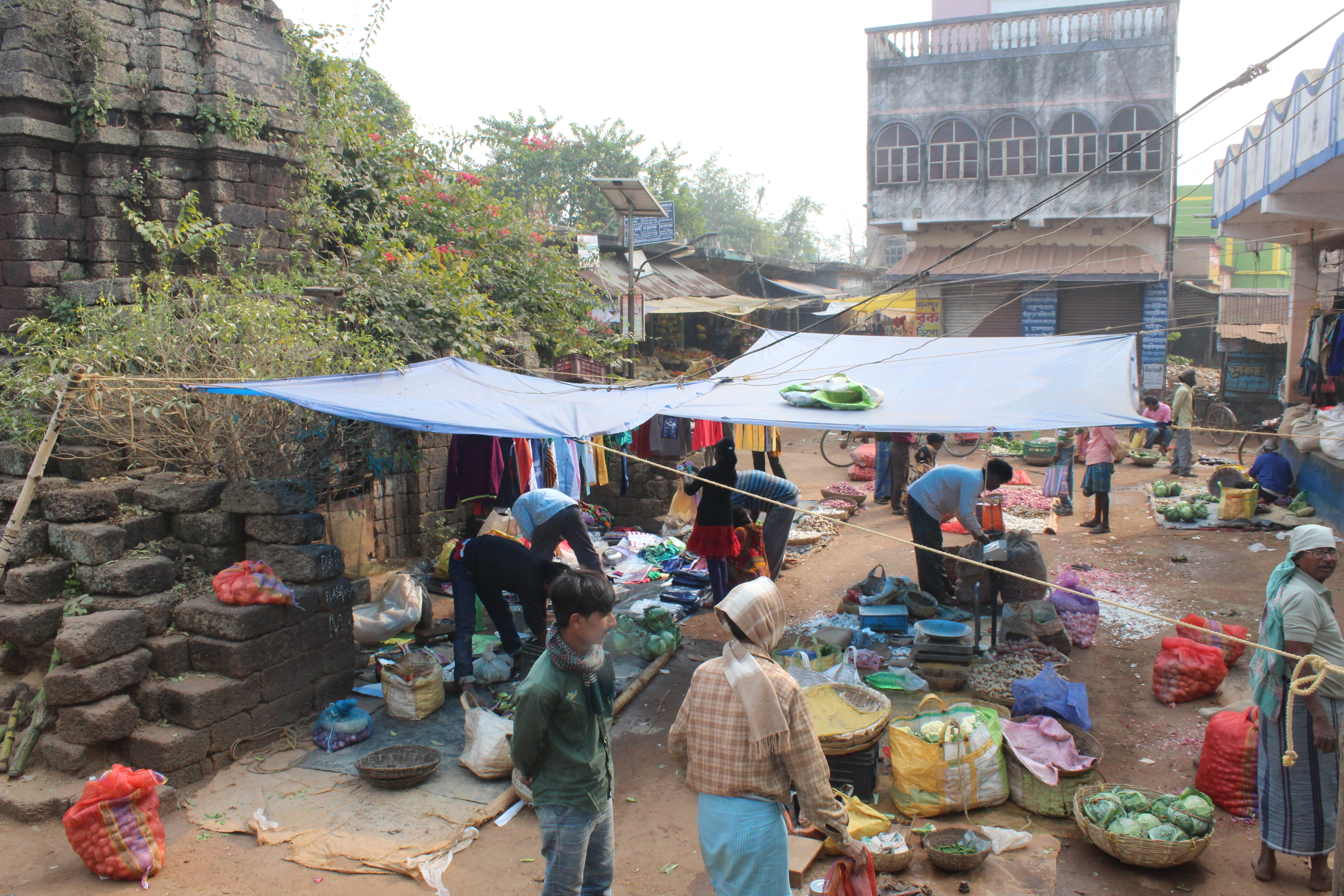
The area around Hakanda temple

Actually Chandicharan Mukhopadhyay was the Dewan of last independent Mallaking, Chaitanya Singh. Dewan Chandicharan started Durga Puja in Maynapur in 1791 AD at a Atchala made of straw and his son Tarini Prasad Mukhopadhyay reconstructed that Atchala as well as Chandimandap in 1847.

== Demographics ==
According to the 2011 Census of India, Maynapur had a total population of 5,256, of which 2,690 (51%) were males and 2,566 (49%) were females. There were 484 persons in the age range of 0–6 years. The total number of literate persons in Maynapur was 4,043 (84.72% of the population over 6 years).

== Education ==
Maynapur C. Mukhopadhaya Madhyamik Shiksha Kendra is a Bengali-medium coeducational institution established in 2004. It has facilities for teaching from class V to class VIII.

Kuchiakole R.B. Institution is a Bengali-medium coeducational institution established in 1862. It has facilities for teaching from class V to class XII. The school has 6 computers, a library with 1,356 books and a playground.

Ashurali Jyotish Chandra High School is a Bengali-medium coeducational institution established in 1964. It has facilities for teaching from class V to class XII. The school has 3 computers and a library with 2,700 books.

Chatra Ramai Pandit Mahavidyalaya, was established at Chatra, PO Darapur in 2000.

== Healthcare ==
Joypur Block Primary Health Centre, with 15 beds at Joypur, is the major government medical facility in the Joypur CD block.

== Transport ==
Maynapur is linked to Bishnupur by an electrified single track line. There is a daily train service between Maynapur and Bankura.
