= Gokulnagar, Bankura =

Gokulnagar
- Village
- Location in West Bengal, India Gokulnagar (India)
- Coordinates: 23.0412°N 87.4617°E
- Country: India
- State: West Bengal
- District: Bankura

Population (2011)
  - Total: 650

Languages
  - Official: Bengali, English
- Time zone: UTC+5:30 (IST)
- PIN: 722122
- Telephone/STD code: 03244
- Lok Sabha constituency: Bishnupur
- Vidhan Sabha constituency: Bishnupur
- Website: bankura.gov.in

Gokulnagar is a village in the Joypur CD block in the Bishnupur subdivision of the Bankura district in the state of West Bengal, India.

== Geography ==
Places in Bishnupur subdivision in Bankura district
M: Municipal town, CT: census town, R: rural/ urban centre, T: ancient/ temple centre
Owing to space constraints in the small map, the actual locations in a larger map may vary slightly

=== Location ===
Gokulnagar is located at 23.0412°N 87.4617°E

=== Area overview ===
The map alongside shows the Bishnupur subdivision of Bankura district. Physiographically, this area has fertile low lying alluvial plains. It is a predominantly rural area with 90.06% of the population living in rural areas and only 8.94% living in the urban areas. It was part of the core area of Mallabhum.

Note: The map alongside presents some of the notable locations in the subdivision. All places marked in the map are linked in the larger full screen map.

== Demographics ==
According to the 2011 Census of India, Gokulnagar had a total population of 650, of which 346 (53%) were males and 304 (47%) were females. There were 64 persons in the age range of 0–6 years. The total number of literate persons in Gokulnagar was 370 (63.14% of the population over 6 years).

== Transport ==
There is a station at Gokulnagar on the Sheoraphuli-Bishnupur branch line (partially under construction).

== Education ==
Gokulnagar R.B. Primary School was established in 1961 and Gokulnagar S. Primary School was established in 1980.

Salda Junior High School was established in 2010. It has facilities for teaching from class V to class VIII.

== Culture ==
The Gokulchand Temple is one of the earliest pancharatna temples of the Malla kings, built of laterite in 1639. Gokulchand Temple is included in the List of Monuments of National Importance in West Bengal by the Archaeological Survey of India (serial no. N-WB-22). Gandheswar Shiva Temple is a more recent addition.

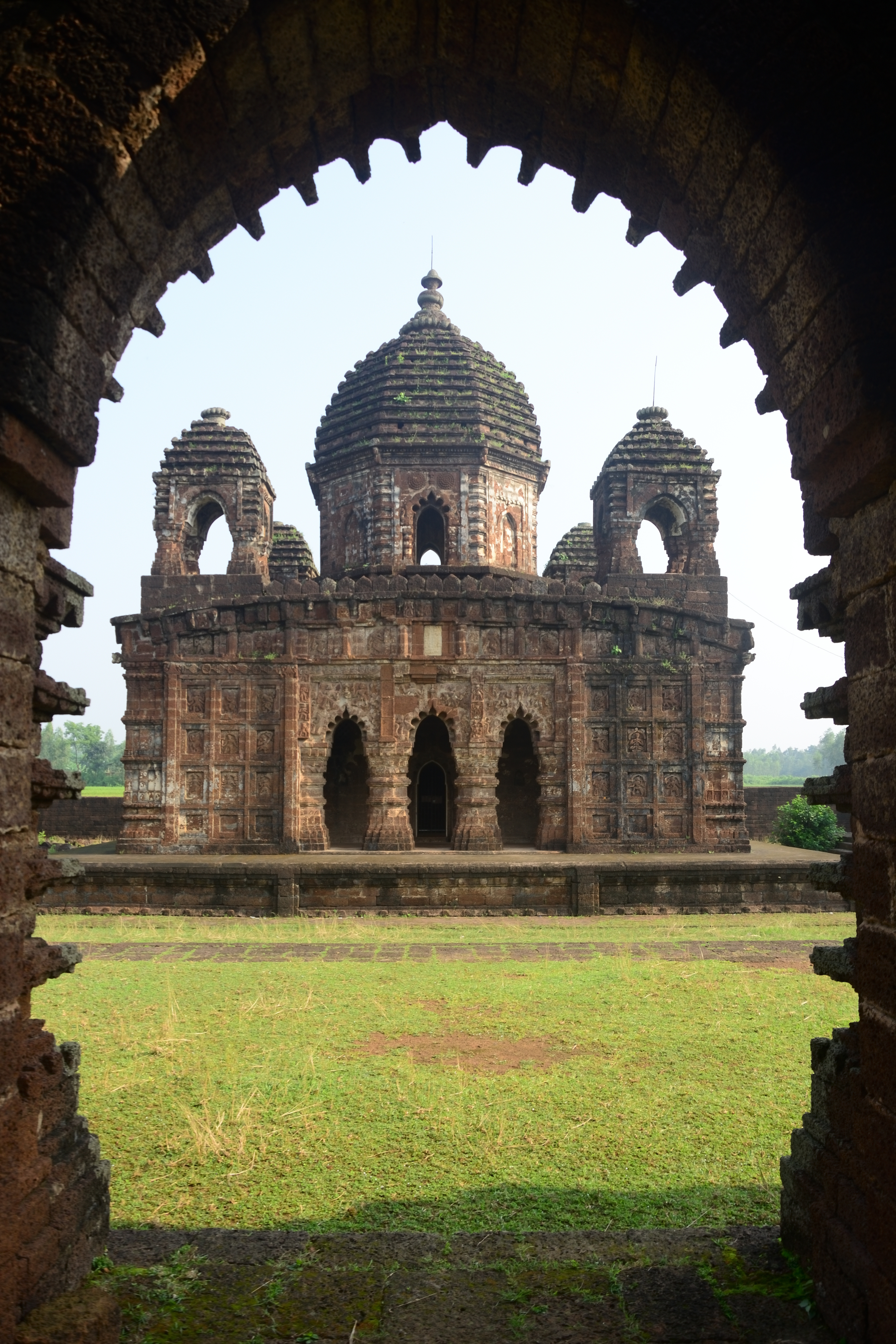
Gokulchand Temple

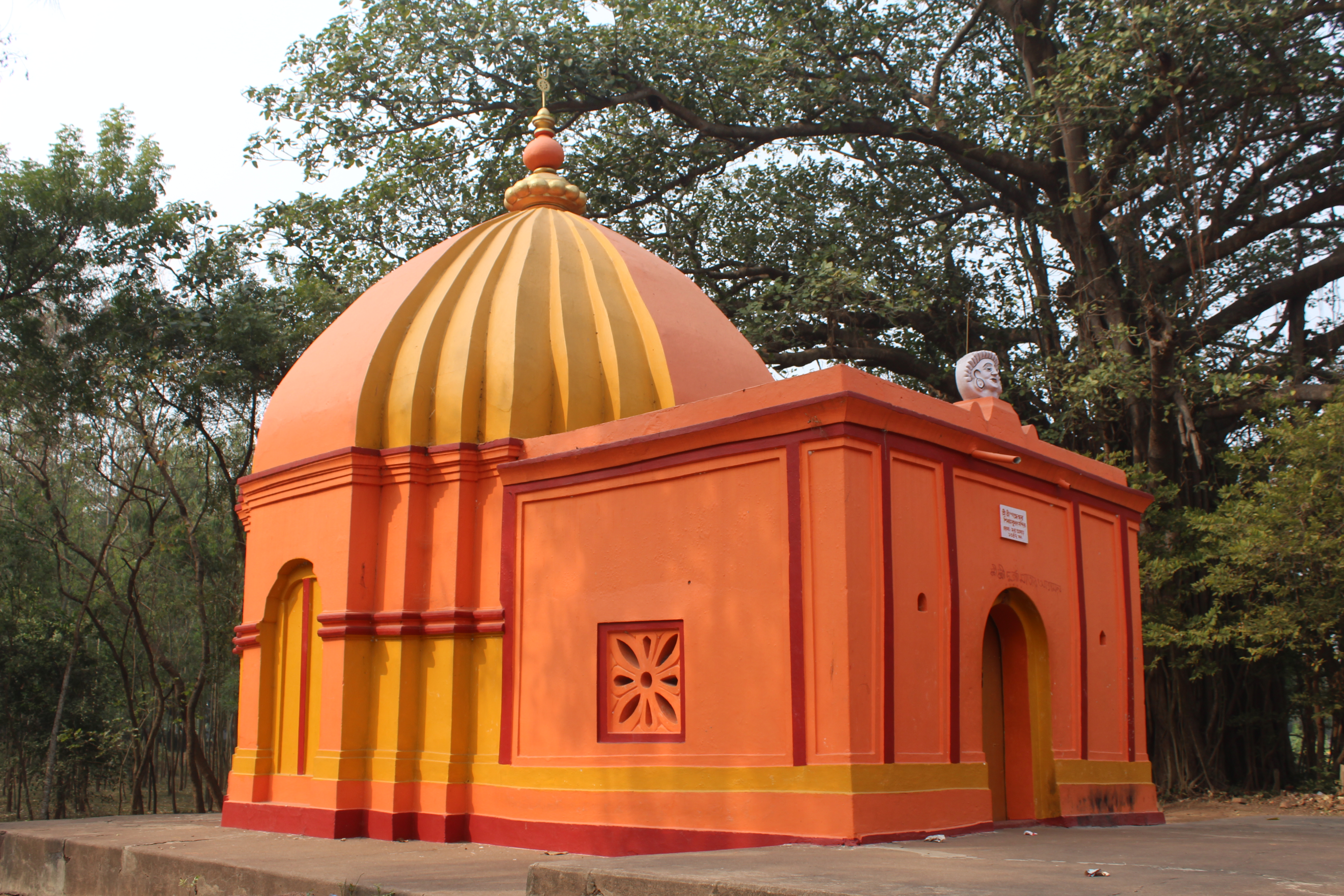
Gandeshwar Shiva Temple

== Healthcare ==
Joypur Block Primary Health Centre, with 15 beds at Joypur, is the major government medical facility in the Joypur CD block.
