= Baital, Bankura =

Baital
- Village
- Location in West Bengal, India Baital (India)
- Coordinates: 22.9634°N 87.4977°E
- Country: India
- State: West Bengal
- District: Bankura

Population (2011)
  - Total: 4,031

Languages
  - Official: Bengali, English
- Time zone: UTC+5:30 (IST)
- PIN: 722140
- Telephone/STD code: 03243
- Lok Sabha constituency: Bishnupur
- Vidhan Sabha constituency: Bishnupur
- Website: bankura.gov.in

Baital is a village in the Joypur CD block in the Bishnupur subdivision of the Bankura district in the state of West Bengal, India. It is a part of Dakshinbar village.

== Geography ==
Places in Bishnupur subdivision in Bankura district
M: Municipal town, CT: census town, R: rural/ urban centre, T: ancient/ temple centre
Owing to space constraints in the small map, the actual locations in a larger map may vary slightly

=== Location ===
Baital is located at 22.9634°N 87.4977°E.

Note: The map alongside presents some of the notable locations in the subdivision. All places marked in the map are linked in the larger full screen map.

== Demographics ==
According to the 2011 Census of India, Dakshinbar had a total population of 4,031, of which 2,070 (51%) were males and 1,961 (49%) were females. There were 408 persons in the age range of 0–6 years. The total number of literate persons in Dakshinbar was 2,754 (76.01% of the population over 6 years).

== Education ==
Baital G.P. Vidyapith is a Bengali-medium coeducational institution established in 1926. It has facilities for teaching from class V to class XII. The school has 11 computers, a library with 1,100 books and a playground.

Baital Girls’ High School is a Bengali-medium girls only institution established in 2011. It has facilities for teaching from class V to class X.

Chatra Ramai Pandit Mahavidyalaya, was established at Chatra, PO Darapur in 2000.

== Culture ==
David J. McCutchion speaks of 2 temples at Baital. One is the Shyama Chandi temple, a pancha ratna with rigged rekha turrets and porch on triple archway, with 35 ft 4 in square base, a laterite plain structure built in 1660. The other is the Jhagrai Chandi temple, a smooth curvilinear rekha, with 11’ 2" square base, a laterite, largely plain structure, built in 1659.

== Baital picture gallery ==
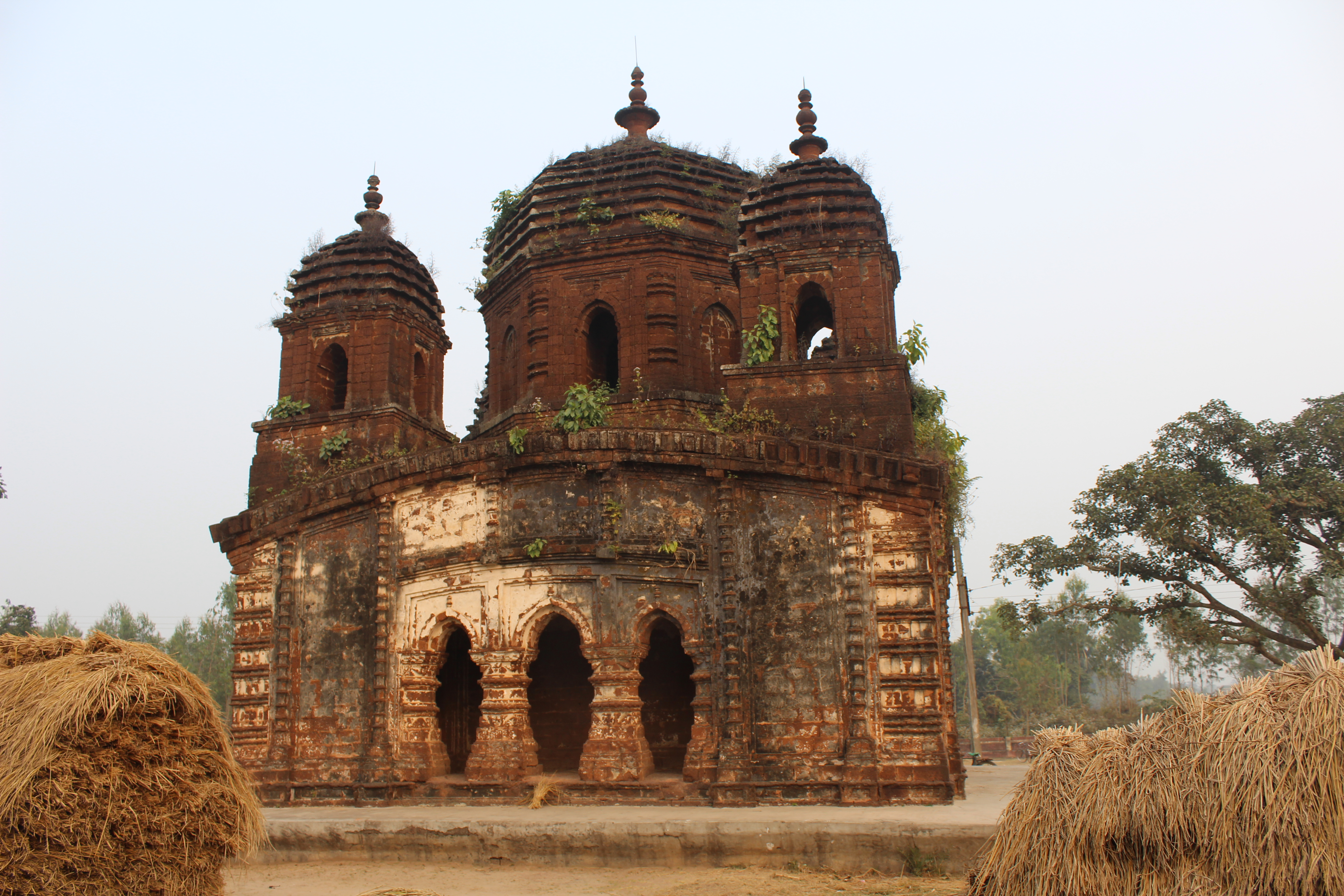
Shayama Chandi temple

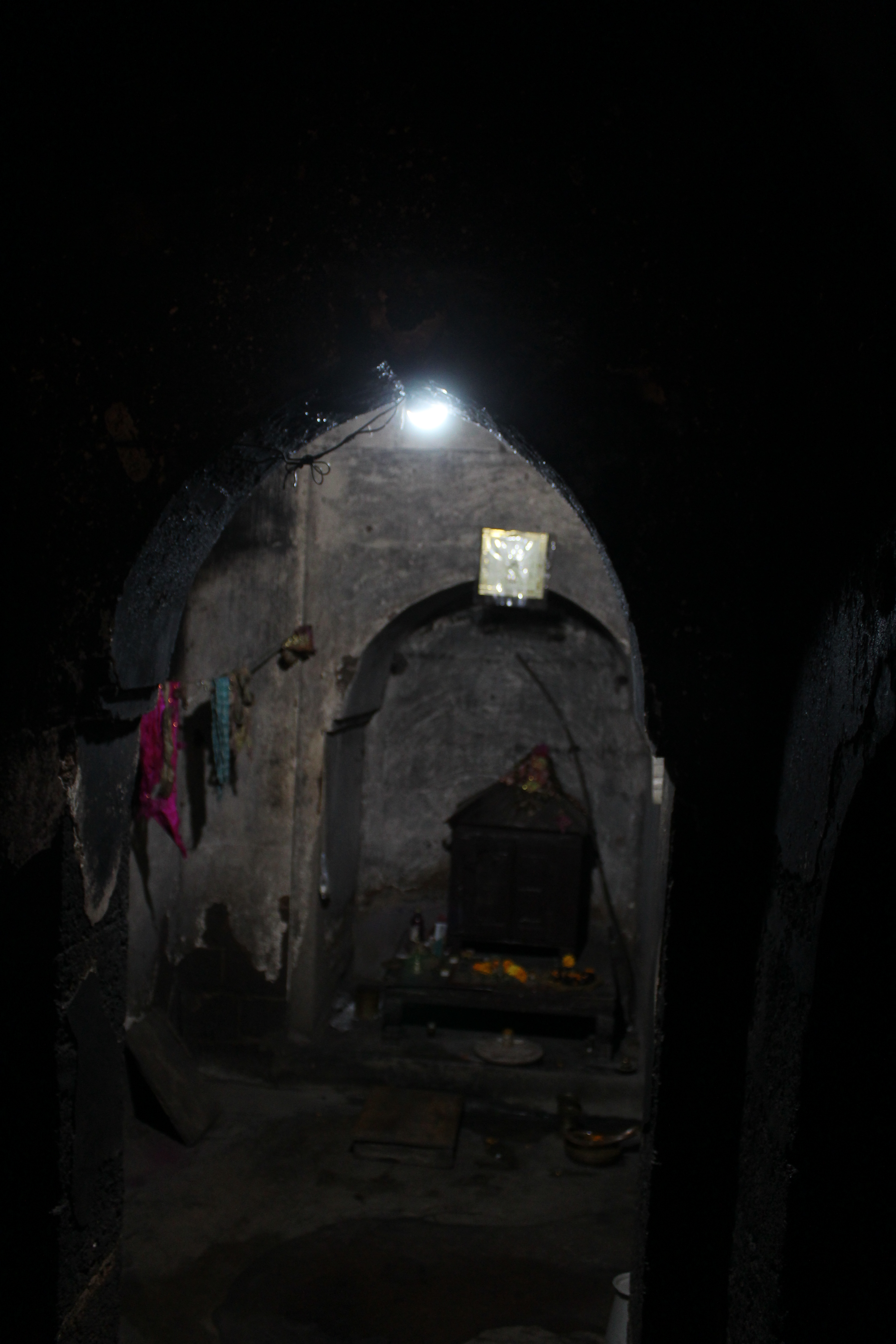
Inside the temple

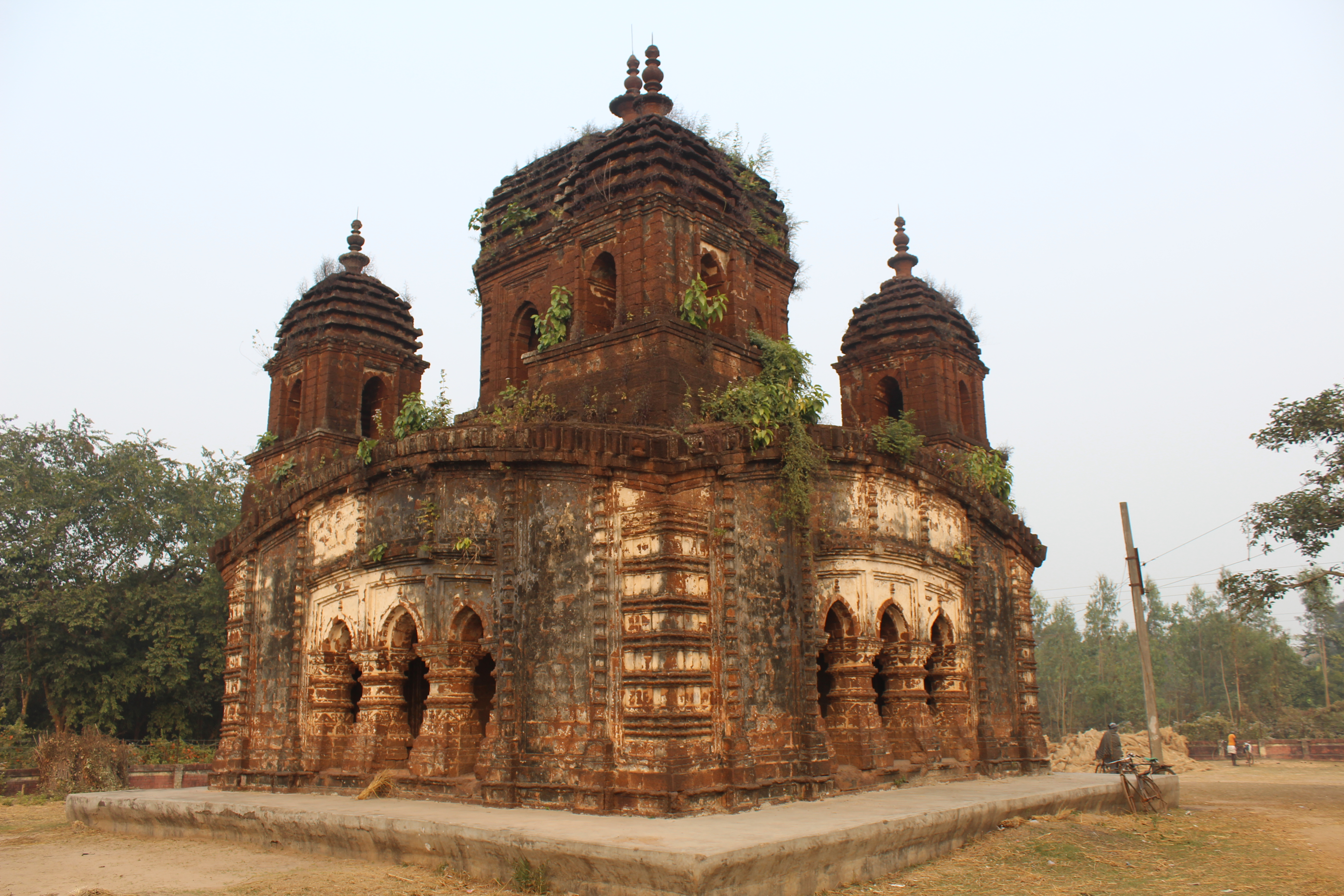
Shyama Chandi temple

== Healthcare ==
Joypur Block Primary Health Centre, with 15 beds at Joypur, is the major government medical facility in the Joypur CD block.
