= Joypur, Bankura (community development block) =

Joypur
- Community development block
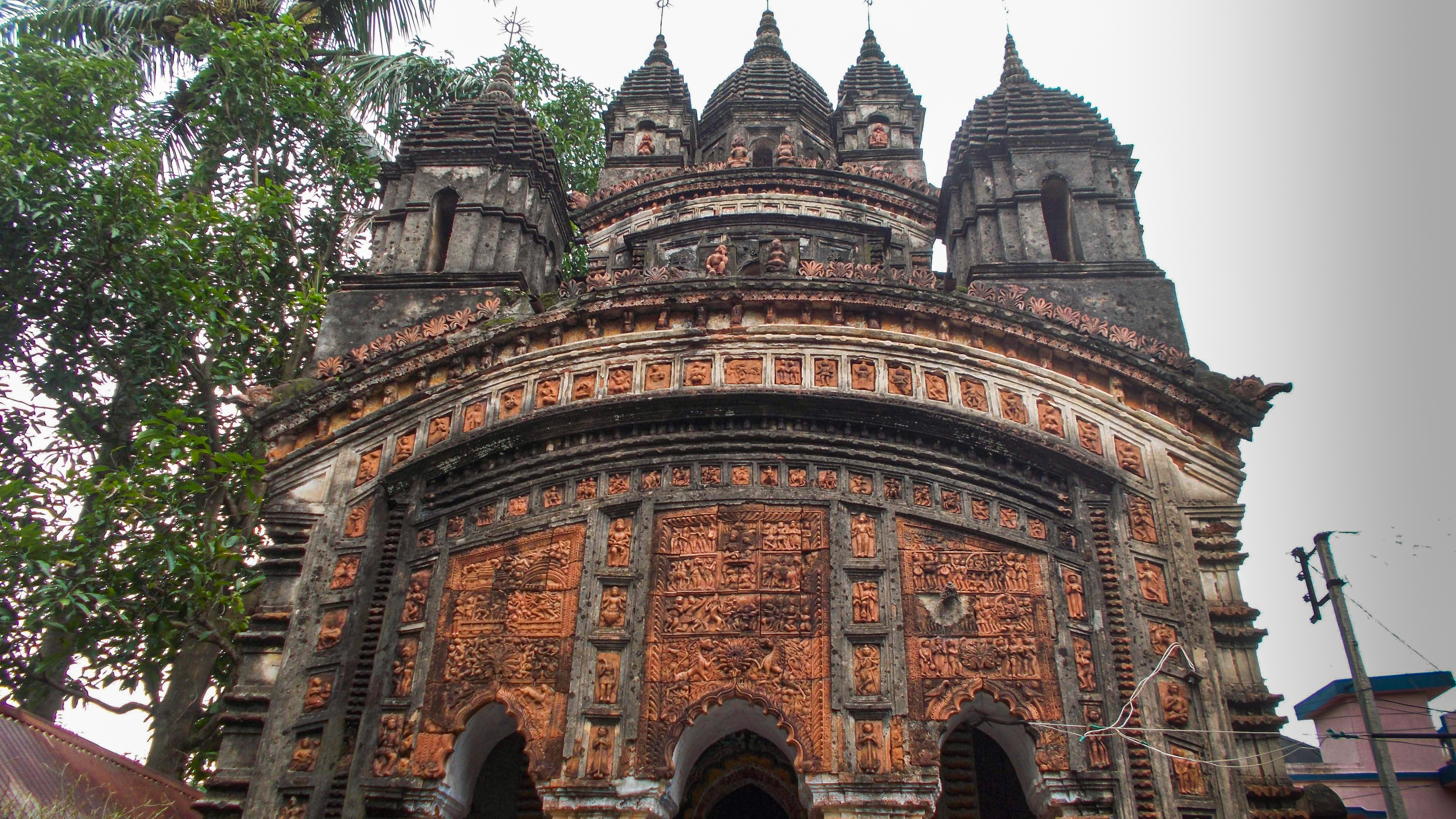
- Depara Navaratna temple at Joypur

- Coordinates: 23.0474°N 87.4467°E
- Country: India
- State: West Bengal
- District: Bankura

Government
  - Type: Representative democracy

Area
  - Total: 262.74 km^{2} (101.44 sq mi)
- Elevation: 74 m (243 ft)

Population (2011)
  - Total: 156,920
  - Density: 597.24/km^{2} (1,546.9/sq mi)

Languages
  - Official: Bengali, English
- Time zone: UTC+5:30 (IST)
- PIN: 722138 (Joypur); 722154 (Gelia)
- Telephone/STD code: 03244
- ISO 3166 code: IN-WB
- Vehicle registration: WB-67, WB-68
- Literacy: 74.57%
- Lok Sabha constituency: Bishnupur
- Vidhan Sabha constituency: Katulpur
- Website: bankura.gov.in

Joypur (also spelled Jaypur, Jaipur) is a community development block (CD block) that forms an administrative division in the Bishnupur subdivision of the Bankura district in the Indian state of West Bengal.

== History ==
=== From Bishnupur kingdom to the British Raj ===
From around the 7th century AD till around the advent of British rule, for around a millennium, history of Bankura district is identical with the rise and fall of the Hindu Rajas of Bishnupur. The Bishnupur Rajas, who were at the summit of their fortunes towards the end of the 17th century, started declining in the first half of the 18th century. First, the Maharaja of Burdwan seized the Fatehpur Mahal, and then the Maratha invasions laid waste their country.

Bishnupur was ceded to the British with the rest of Burdwan chakla in 1760. In 1787, Bishnupur was united with Birbhum to form a separate administrative unit. In 1793 it was transferred to the Burdwan collectorate. In 1879, the district acquired its present shape with the thanas of Khatra and Raipur and the outpost of Simplapal being transferred from Manbhum, and the thanas of Sonamukhi, Kotulpur and Indas being retransferred from Burdwan. However, it was known for sometime as West Burdwan and in 1881 came to be known as Bankura district.

== Geography ==
Map of Bankura District showing CD blocks and municipalities. The only CD block not marked on the map is Joypur

Joypur is located at 23°02′51″N 87°26′48″E.

Joypur CD block is located in the eastern part of the district and belongs to the fertile low lying alluvial plains, similar to the predominating rice lands in the adjacent districts of West Bengal. Here, the eye constantly rests on wide expanses of rice fields, green in the rains but parched and dry in summer.

Joypur CD block is bounded by Patrasayer CD block on the north, Indas and Kotulpur CD blocks on the east, Garhbeta I CD block in Paschim Medinipur district, on the south and Bishnupur CD block on the west.

Joypur CD block has an area of 263.82 km^{2}. It has 1 panchayat samity, 9 gram panchayats, 116 gram sansads (village councils), 139 mouzas and 137 inhabited villages. Jaypur police station serves this block. Headquarters of this CD block is at Joypur.

In Bankura district 148,177 hectares or 21.5% of total geographical area of the district is forested. The forests contain the best quality sal (Shorea robusta) trees. Large forest areas exist in Sonamukhi, Joypur, Bishnupur, Khatra and Ranibandh areas.

Gram panchayats of Joypur block/ panchayat samiti are: Gelia, Hetia, Jagannathpur, Kuchiakole, Maynapur, Routhkhanda, Salda, Shyamnagar and Uttarbar.

== Demographics ==
=== Population ===
According to the 2011 Census of India, Joypur CD block had a total population of 156,920, all of which were rural. There were 80,138 (51%) males and 76,782 (49%) females. Population in the age range of 0 to 6 years was 17,516. Scheduled Castes numbered 61,005 (38.88%) and Scheduled Tribes numbered 3,210 (2.05%).

According to the 2001 census, Joypur block had a total population of 141,483, out of which 72,339 were males and 69,144 were females. Joypur block registered a population growth of 15.89 per cent during the 1991-2001 decade. Decadal growth for the district was 15.15 per cent. Decadal growth in West Bengal was 17.84 per cent.

Large villages (with 4,000+ population) in Joypur CD block are (2011 census figures in brackets): Salda (4,851), Kuchiakol (4,246), Maynapur (5,256) and Dakshinbar (4,031).

Other villages in Joypur CD block are (2011 census figures in brackets): Jaypur (3,136), Gelia (1,655), Hetia (2,757), Rauthkhanda (3,697), Shyamnagar (1,134) and Gokulnagar (650).

=== Literacy ===
According to the 2011 census, the total number of literates in Joypur CD block was 103,951 (74.57% of the population over 6 years) out of which males numbered 59,088 (83.04% of the male population over 6 years) and females numbered 44,863 (65.74%) of the female population over 6 years). The gender disparity (the difference between female and male literacy rates) was 17.30%.

See also – List of West Bengal districts ranked by literacy rate

Literacy in CD blocks of
Bankura district
Bankura Sadar subdivision
Saltora – 61.45%
Mejia – 66.83%
Gangajalghati – 68.11%
Chhatna – 65.73%
Bankura I – 68.74%
Bankura II – 73.59%
Barjora – 71.67%
Onda – 65.82%
Bishnupur subdivision
Indas – 71.70%
Joypur – 74.57%
Patrasayer – 64.8%
Kotulpur – 78.01%
Sonamukhi – 66.16%
Bishnupur – 66.30%
Khatra subdivision
Indpur – 67.42%
Ranibandh – 68.53%
Khatra – 72.18%
Hirbandh – 64.18%
Raipur – 71.33%
Sarenga – 74.25%
Simlapal – 68.44%
Taldangra – 70.87%
2011 Census: CD Block Wise

Primary Census Abstract Data

=== Language and religion ===
Religion in Joypur CD block (2011)
Hinduism	84.60%
Islam	14.93%
Other or not stated	0.47%

In the 2011 census Hindus numbered 132,747 and formed 84.60% of the population in Jaipur CD block. Muslims numbered 23,431 and formed 14.93% of the population. Others numbered 742 and formed 0.47% of the population. Others include Addi Bassi, Marang Boro, Santal, Saranath, Sari Dharma, Sarna, Alchchi, Bidin, Sant, Saevdharm, Seran, Saran, Sarin, Kheria, and other religious communities. In 2001, Hindus were 85.83% and Muslims 13.94% of the population respectively.

Languages of Joypur CD block (2011)
1. Bengali (98.4%)
2. Santali (1.52%)
3. Others (0.05%)

At the time of the 2011 census, 98.43% of the population spoke Bengali and 1.52% Santali as their first language.

== Rural poverty ==
In Joypur CD Block 34.37% families were living below poverty line in 2007. According to the Rural Household Survey in 2005, 28.87% of the total number of families were BPL families in the Bankura district.

== Economy ==
=== Livelihood ===
Livelihood
in Joypur CD block
1. Cultivators (25.4%)
2. Agricultural labourers (44.9%)
3. Household industries (5.81%)
4. Other Workers (23.8%)

In the Joypur CD block in 2011, among the class of total workers, cultivators numbered 16,314 and formed 25.45%, agricultural labourers numbered 28,805 and formed 44.93%, household industry workers numbered 3,723 and formed 5.81% and other workers numbered 15,272 and formed 23.82%. Total workers numbered 64,114 and formed 40.86% of the total population, and non-workers numbered 92,806 and formed 59.14% of the population.

Note: In the census records a person is considered a cultivator, if the person is engaged in cultivation/ supervision of land owned by self/government/institution. When a person who works on another person's land for wages in cash or kind or share, is regarded as an agricultural labourer. Household industry is defined as an industry conducted by one or more members of the family within the household or village, and one that does not qualify for registration as a factory under the Factories Act. Other workers are persons engaged in some economic activity other than cultivators, agricultural labourers and household workers. It includes factory, mining, plantation, transport and office workers, those engaged in business and commerce, teachers, entertainment artistes and so on.

=== Infrastructure ===
There are 137 inhabited villages in the Joypur CD block, as per the District Census Handbook, Bankura, 2011. 100% villages have power supply. 100% villages have drinking water supply. 25 villages (18.25%) have post offices. 114 villages (83.21%) have telephones (including landlines, public call offices and mobile phones). 48 villages (35.04%) have pucca (paved) approach roads and 77 villages (56.20%) have transport communication (includes bus service, rail facility and navigable waterways). 16 villages (11.68%) have agricultural credit societies and 7 villages (5.11%) have banks.

=== Agriculture ===
There were 123 fertiliser depots, 13 seed stores and 40 fair price shops in Joypur CD block.

In 2013–14, persons engaged in agriculture in Joypur CD block could be classified as follows: bargadars 19.10%, patta (document) holders 14.41%, small farmers (possessing land between 1 and 2 hectares) 4.88%, marginal farmers (possessing land up to 1 hectare) 15.43% and agricultural labourers 46.17%.

In 2003-04 net area sown Joypur CD block was 14,039 hectares and the area in which more than one crop was grown was 9,650 hectares.

In 2013–14, the total area irrigated in Joypur CD block was 19,907 hectares, out of which 14,474 hectares was by canal water, 2,021 hectares by tank water, 560 hectares by river lift irrigation, 524 hectares by deep tube well, 2,178 hectares by shallow tubewell and 150 hectares by open dug wells.

In 2013–14, Joypur CD block produced 29,897 tonnes of Aman paddy, the main winter crop, from 10,990 hectares, 7,016 tonnes of Aus paddy from 2,699 hectares, 14,751 tonnes of Boro paddy from 5,569 hectares, 1,046 tonnes of wheat from 450 hectares and 21,585,000 tonnes of potatoes from 2,384 hectares. It also produced pulses and mustard.

=== Handloom and pottery industries ===
The handloom industry engages the largest number of persons in the non farm sector and hence is important in Bankura district. The handloom industry is well established in all the CD Blocks of the district and includes the famous Baluchari saris. In 2004-05 Joypur CD block had 575 looms in operation.

Bankura district is famous for the artistic excellence of its pottery products that include the famous Bankura horse. The range of pottery products is categorised as follows: domestic utilities, terracota and other decorative items and roofing tiles and other heavy pottery items. Around 3,200 families were involved in pottery making in the district in 2002. 160 families were involved in Joypur CD block.

=== Banking ===
In 2013–14, Joypur CD block had offices of 5 commercial banks and 2 gramin banks.

=== Backward Regions Grant Fund ===
The Bankura district is listed as a backward region and receives financial support from the Backward Regions Grant Fund. The fund, created by the Government of India, is designed to redress regional imbalances in development. As of 2012, 272 districts across the country were listed under this scheme. The list includes 11 districts of West Bengal.

== Transport ==
In 2013–14, Joypur CD block had 2 ferry services and 6 originating/ terminating bus routes.

State Highway 2 (West Bengal) running from Bankura to Malancha (in North 24 Parganas district) passes through this CD block.

== Education ==
In 2013–14, Joypur CD block had 161 primary schools with 12,226 students, 18 middle schools with 2,705 students, 9 high schools with 4,158 students and 13 higher secondary schools with 12,059 students. Joypur CD block had 1 general college with 1,112 students and 260 institutions for special and non-formal education with 8,119 students.

See also – Education in India

According to the 2011 census, in the Joypur CD block, among the 137 inhabited villages, 10 villages did not have a school, 54 villages had two or more primary schools, 43 villages had at least 1 primary and 1 middle school and 24 villages had at least 1 middle and 1 secondary school.

Joypur B.Ed. College at Jaypur,

== Culture ==
There are several heritage temples in the Joypur CD block:

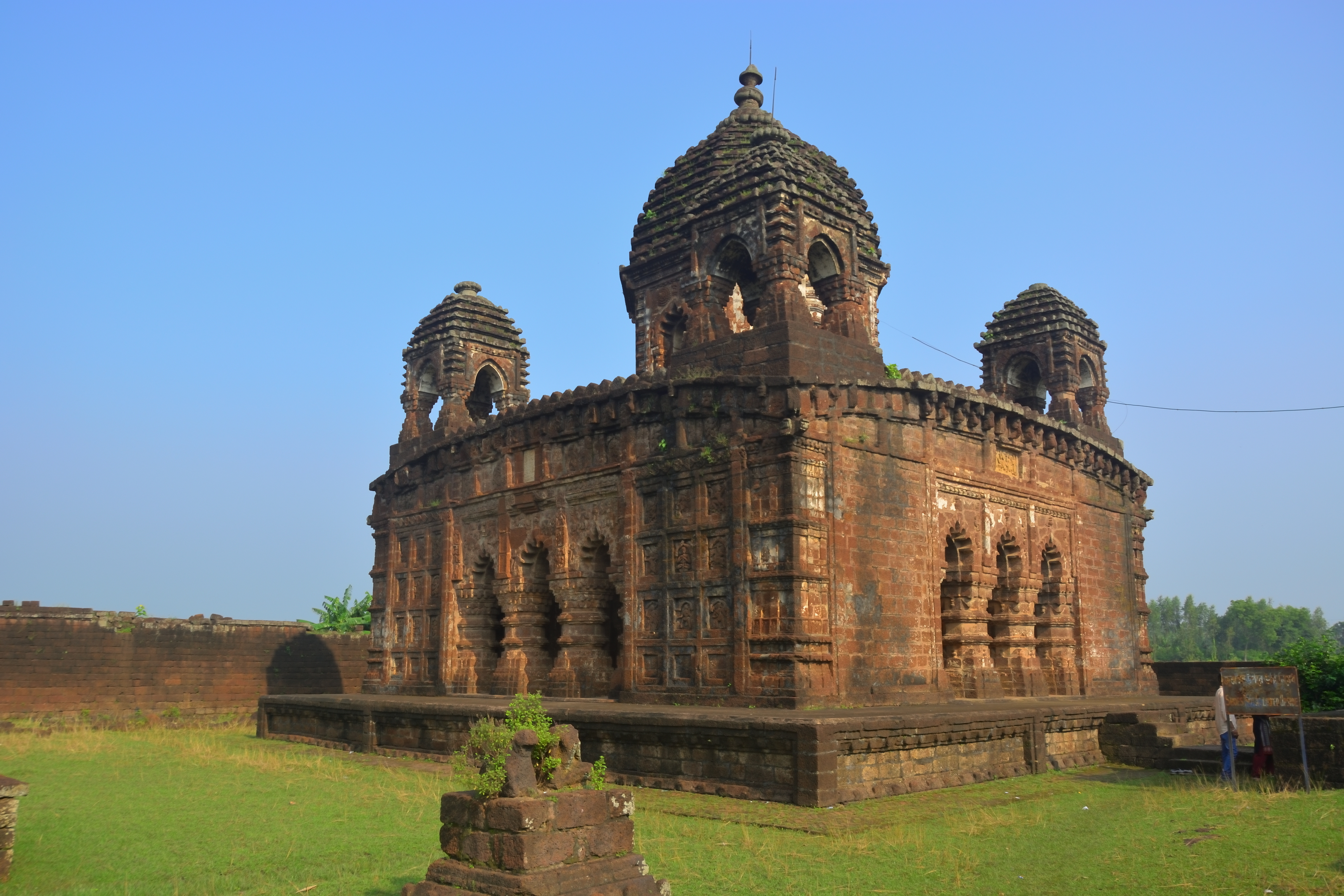
Gokulnagar: Gokulchand Temple - Monument of National Importance Pancha ratna, laterite built in the 17th century, with stucco figures.

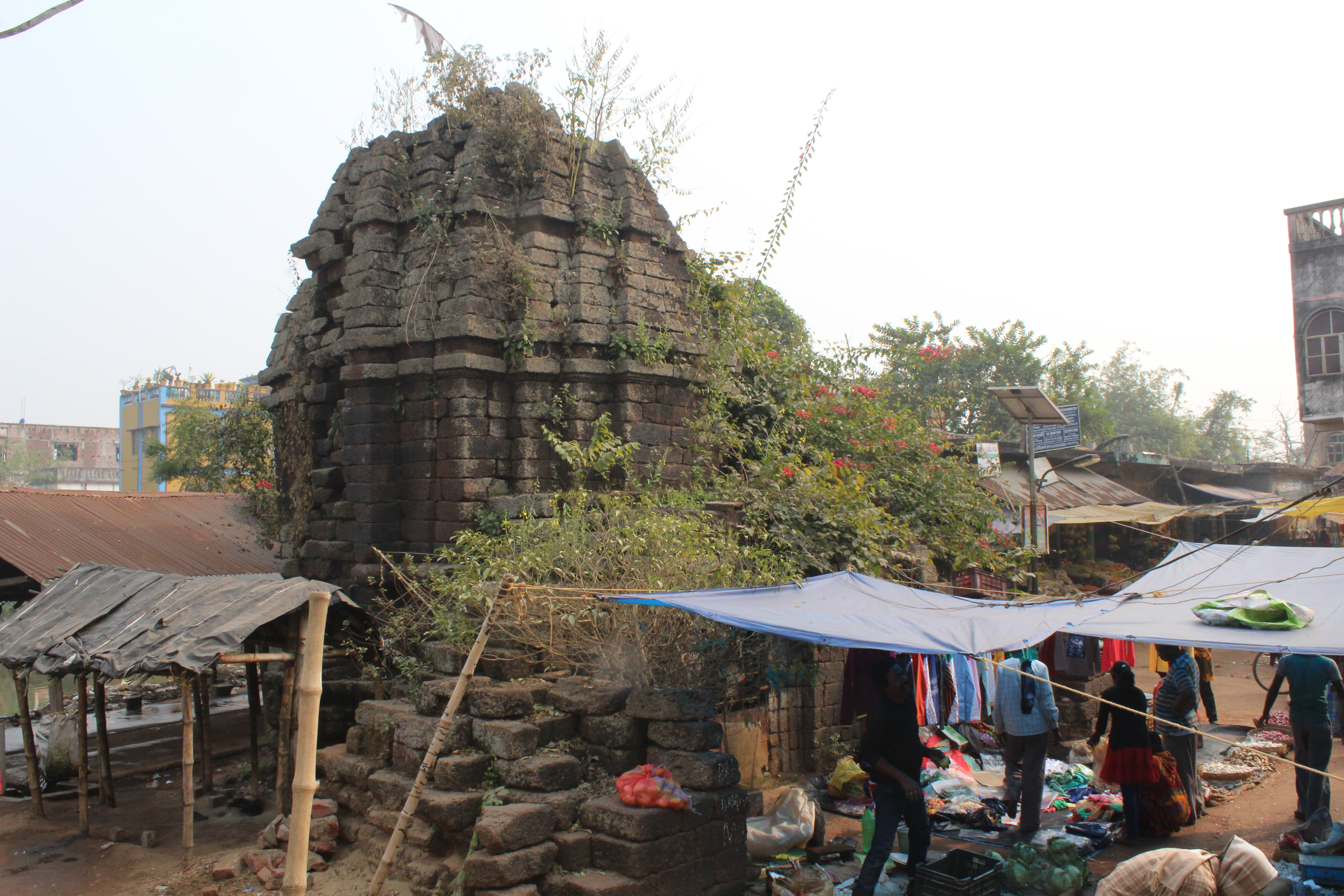
Maynapur, Hakanda temple, plain, laterite built in 18th century.

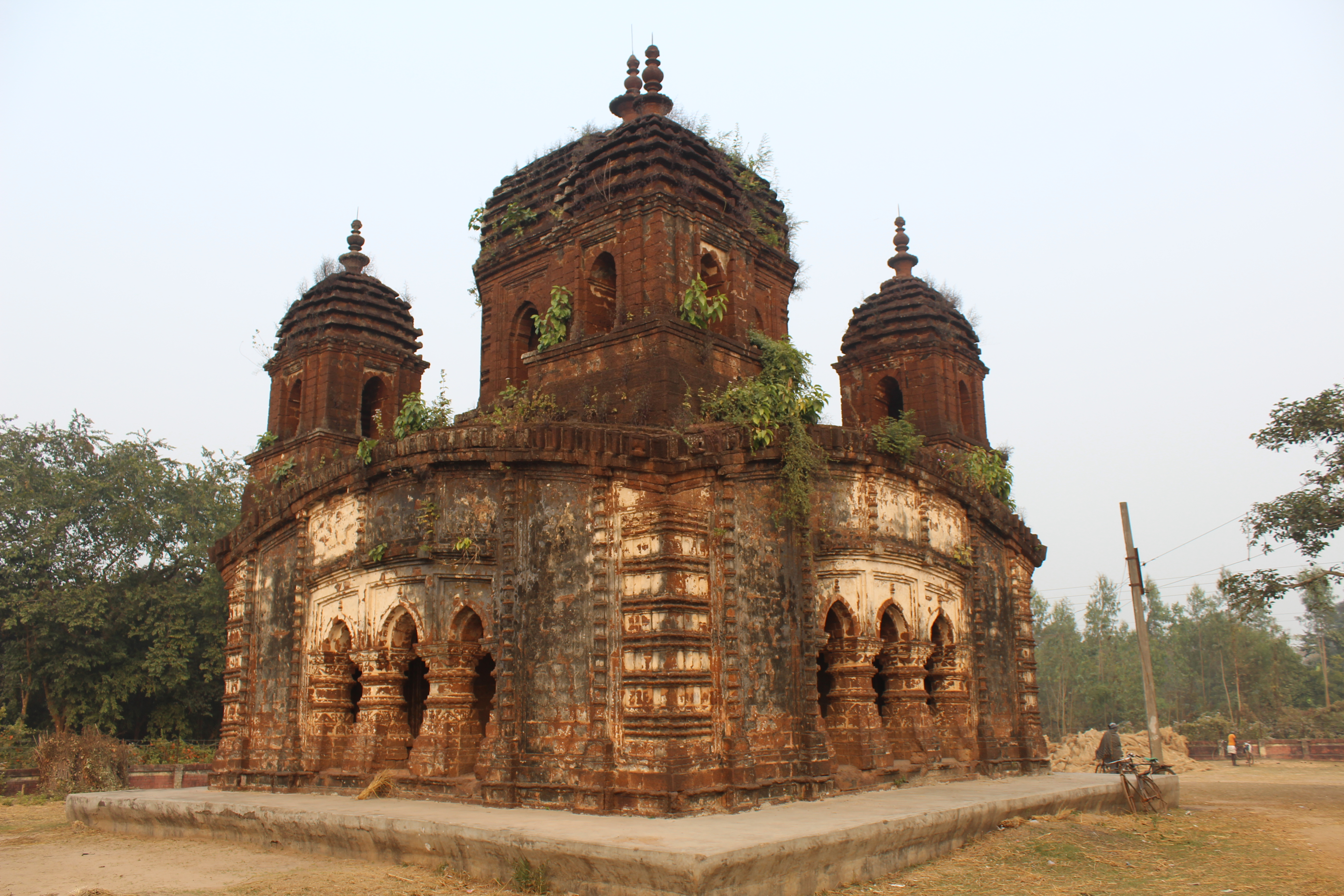
Baital: Pancha ratna Shyama Chandi temple, plain laterite structure built in 1660.

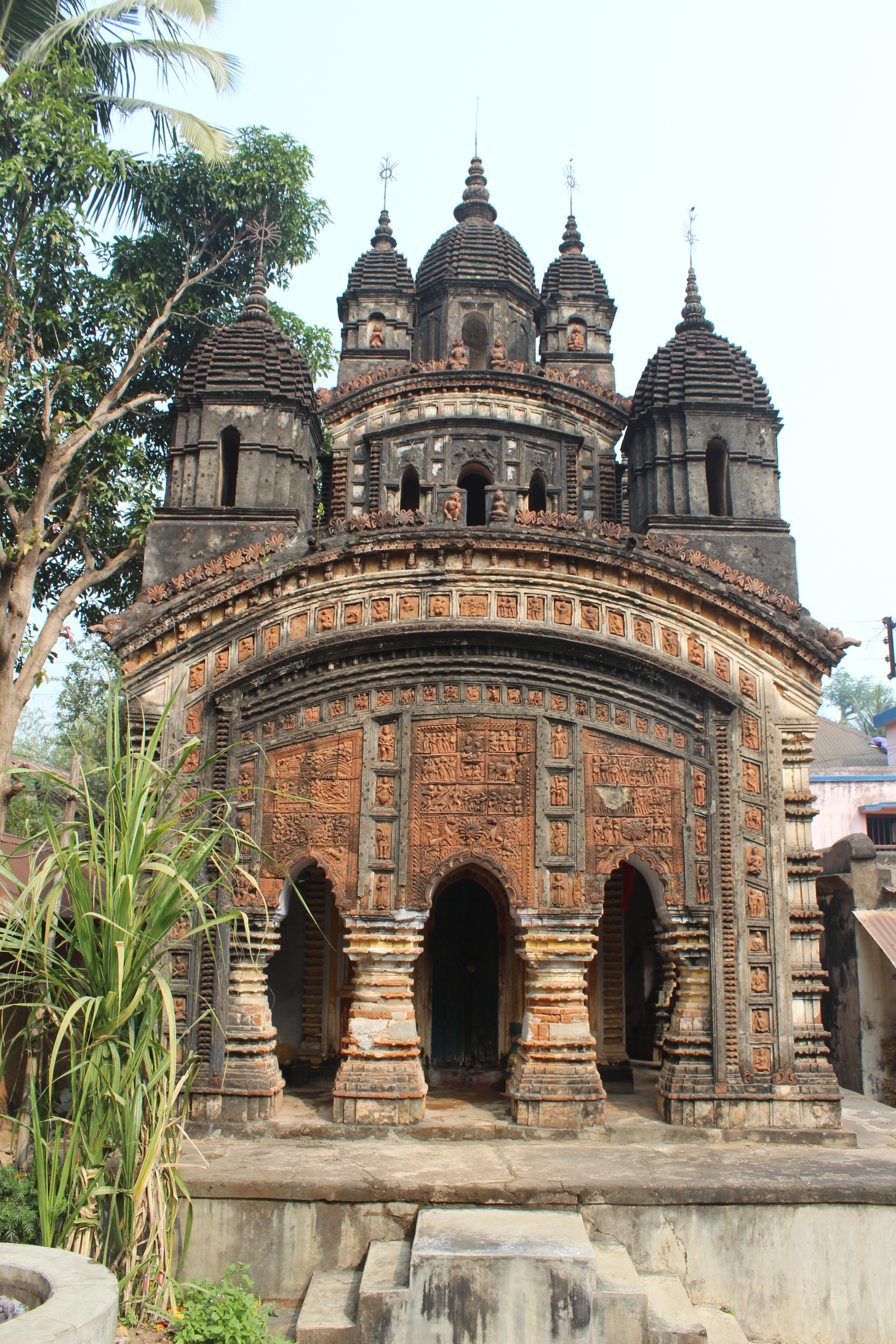
Joypur: De para nava ratna temple (in picture), Dutta para nava ratna temple and deul and atchala temples, all with rich terracotta decoration. There is an inscription on the wall of that nava ratna temple of De para, which indicates the establishment year of that temple‌, which was 16thJanuary in the year of 1844, In this temple, the Janardhana as well as lord Krishna is worshipped by de family till now,*.

== Healthcare ==
In 2014, Joypur CD block had 1 block primary health centre and 4 primary health centres with total 52 beds and 5 doctors. It had 25 family welfare sub centres and 1 family welfare centre. 2,636 patients were treated indoor and 10,043 patients were treated outdoor in the hospitals, health centres and subcentres of the CD block.

Joypur Block Primary Health Centre, with 15 beds at Joypur, is the major government medical facility in the Joypur CD block. There are primary health centres at Hijaldiha (with 10 beds), Uttarbar (Magura) (with 10 beds), Hetia (panchayat management) (with 6 beds) and Jagannathpur (with 10 beds).
