= Gokulchand temple =

Hindu temple in Gokulnagar, India

- An ASI Listed Monument
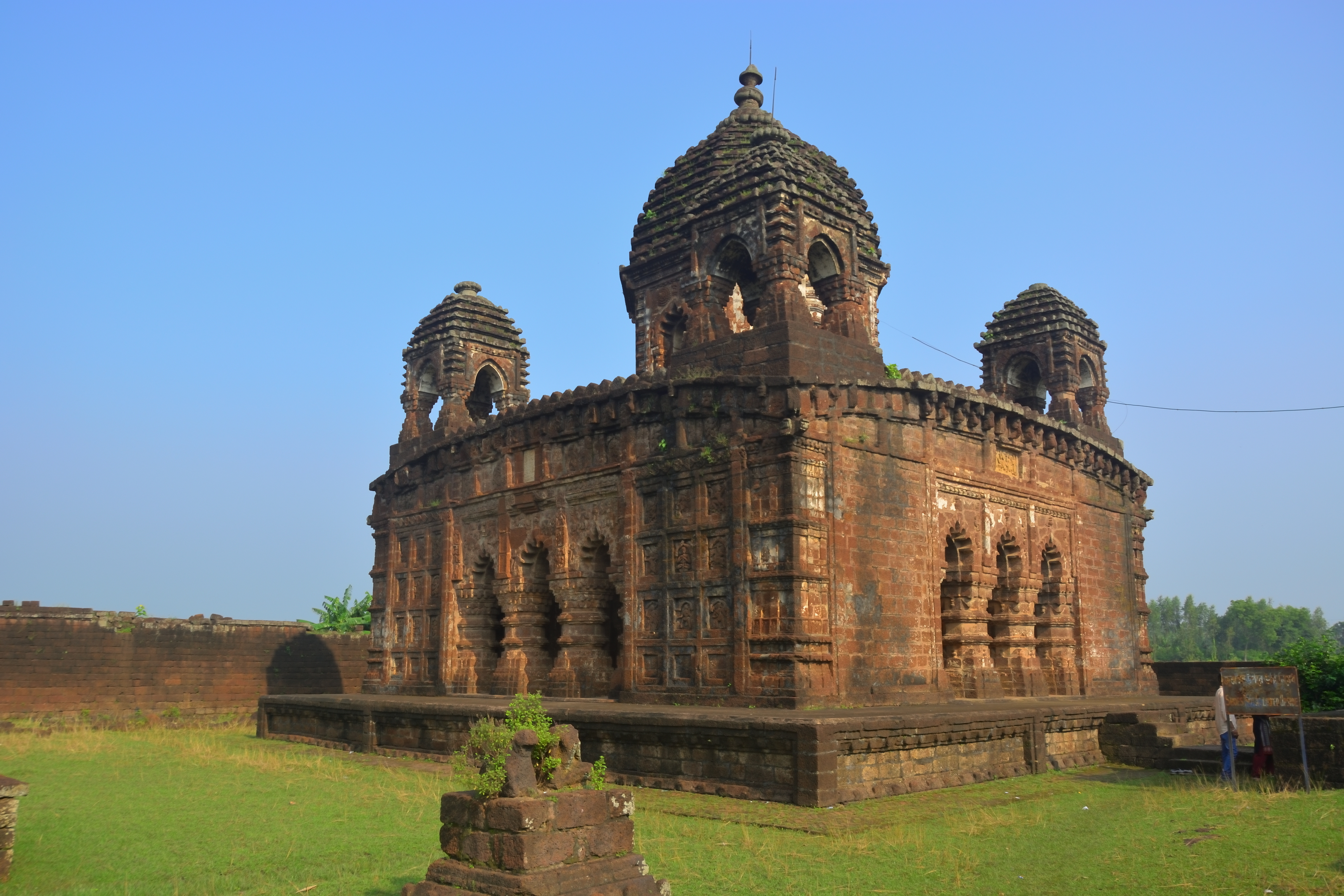
- Gokulchand temple

- Location within West Bengal Location within India

Religion
- Affiliation: Hinduism

Location
- Location: Gokulnagar; Bankura district
- State: West Bengal
- Country: India
- Interactive map of Gokulchand temple
- Coordinates: 23.0412°N 87.4617°E

Architecture
- Type: Bengal temple architecture
- Style: Pancharatna style
- Founder: Raghunath Singha
- Established: 1643; 383 years ago
- Monument of National Importance
- Official name: Gokul Chand temple
- Type: Cultural
- Reference no.: N-WB-31

Gokulchand temple is a 17th-century stone built pancharatna temple in Gokulnagar village in the Joypur CD block in the Bishnupur subdivision of the Bankura district in the state of West Bengal, India.

== Geography ==
Places in Bishnupur subdivision in Bankura district
M: Municipal town, CT: census town, R: rural/ urban centre, T: ancient/ temple centre
Owing to space constraints in the small map, the actual locations in a larger map may vary slightly

=== Location ===
Gokulnagar is located at 23.0412°N 87.4617°E.

Gokulnagar is off the State Highway 2 at Salda.

Note: The map alongside presents some of the notable locations in the subdivision. All places marked in the map are linked in the larger full screen map.

== History and architecture ==
David J. McCutchion mentions the Gokulchand temple at Gokulnagar as one of the earliest pancharatna temples of the Malla kings. It has turrets on four columns, a kind of chhatri, instead of the corner wall sections. Along with the at-chala, the pancharatna is the most popular type of temple in Bengal. With a 45 feet square base, it is built of laterite with stucco figures. According to the badly damaged temple plate it was built in 1639 (and that obviously goes with a question mark).

This pancharatna (five-pinnacled) temple at Gokulnagar is the largest stone temple in Bankura district. It is 64 ft. in height and the area of temple complex is 23,500 sq. ft. According to the ASI information board at the temple, it was built in 1643, during the reign of the Malla king, Raghunath Singha. The style of construction of the temple is similar to that of the Shaymaraya temple at Bishnupur. The wall decorations depict various avatars of Vishnu and raslila motifs and other mythological incidents.

The temple was in a bad shape and plundered till it was taken over by the Archaeological Survey of India in 1996. The idol of Lord Krishna has long been removed to Bishnupur. The complex is abuzz with activity when the idol is brought back for 5 days during Holi and worshipped here.

According to the List of Monuments of National Importance in West Bengal (serial no. N-WB-31) Gokulchand temple is an ASI listed monument.

== Gokulchand temple picture gallery ==
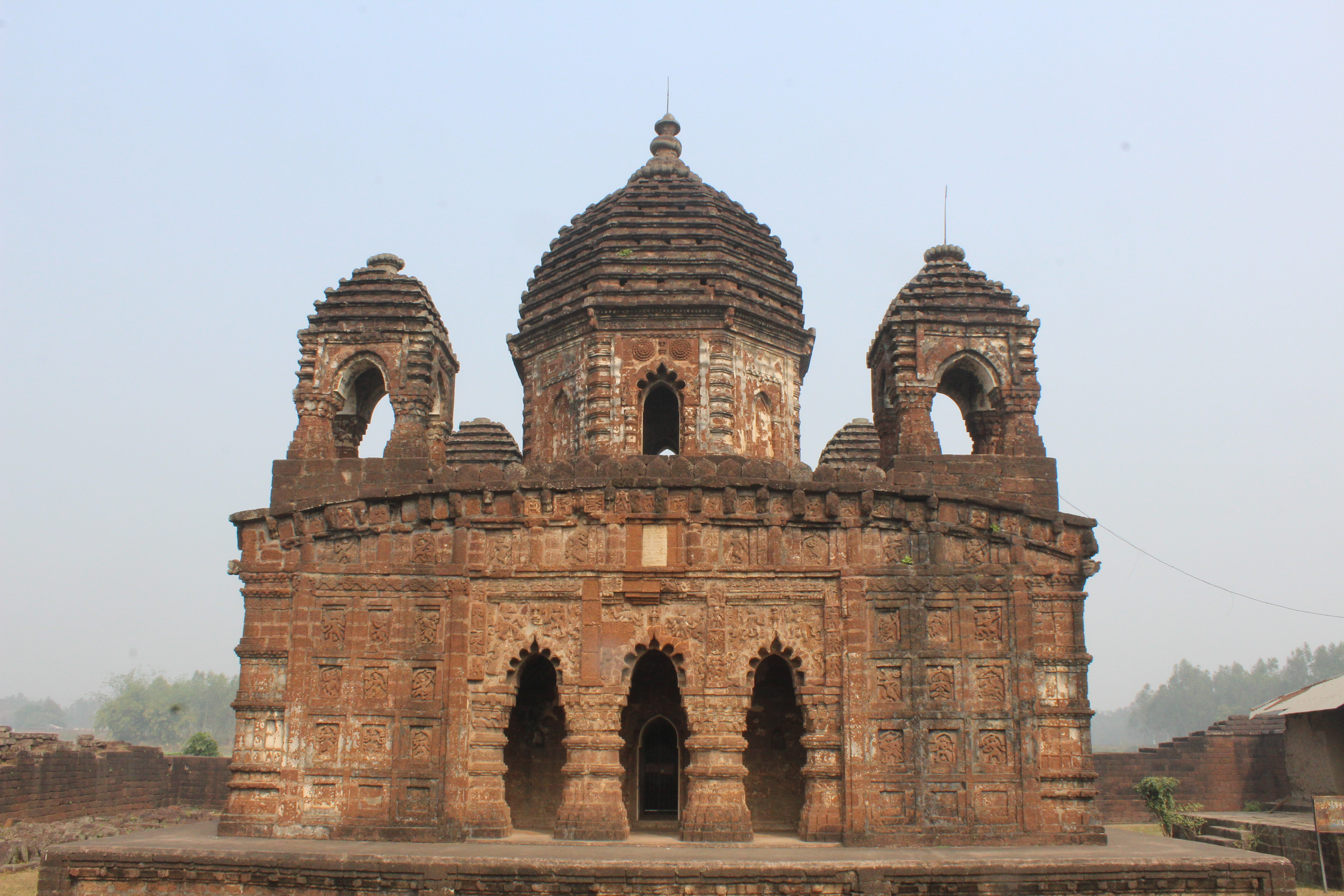
Gokulchand temple

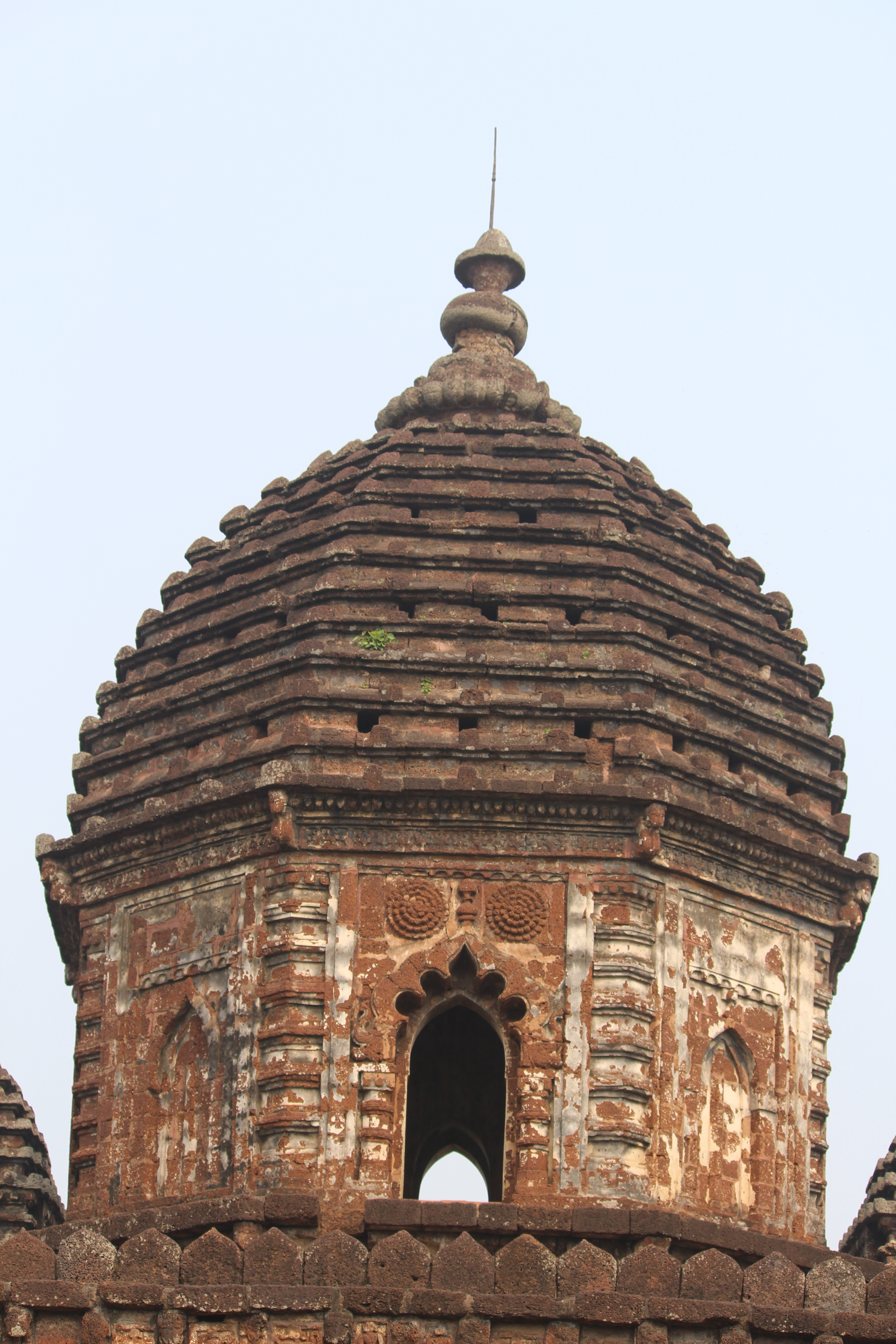
The central top structure

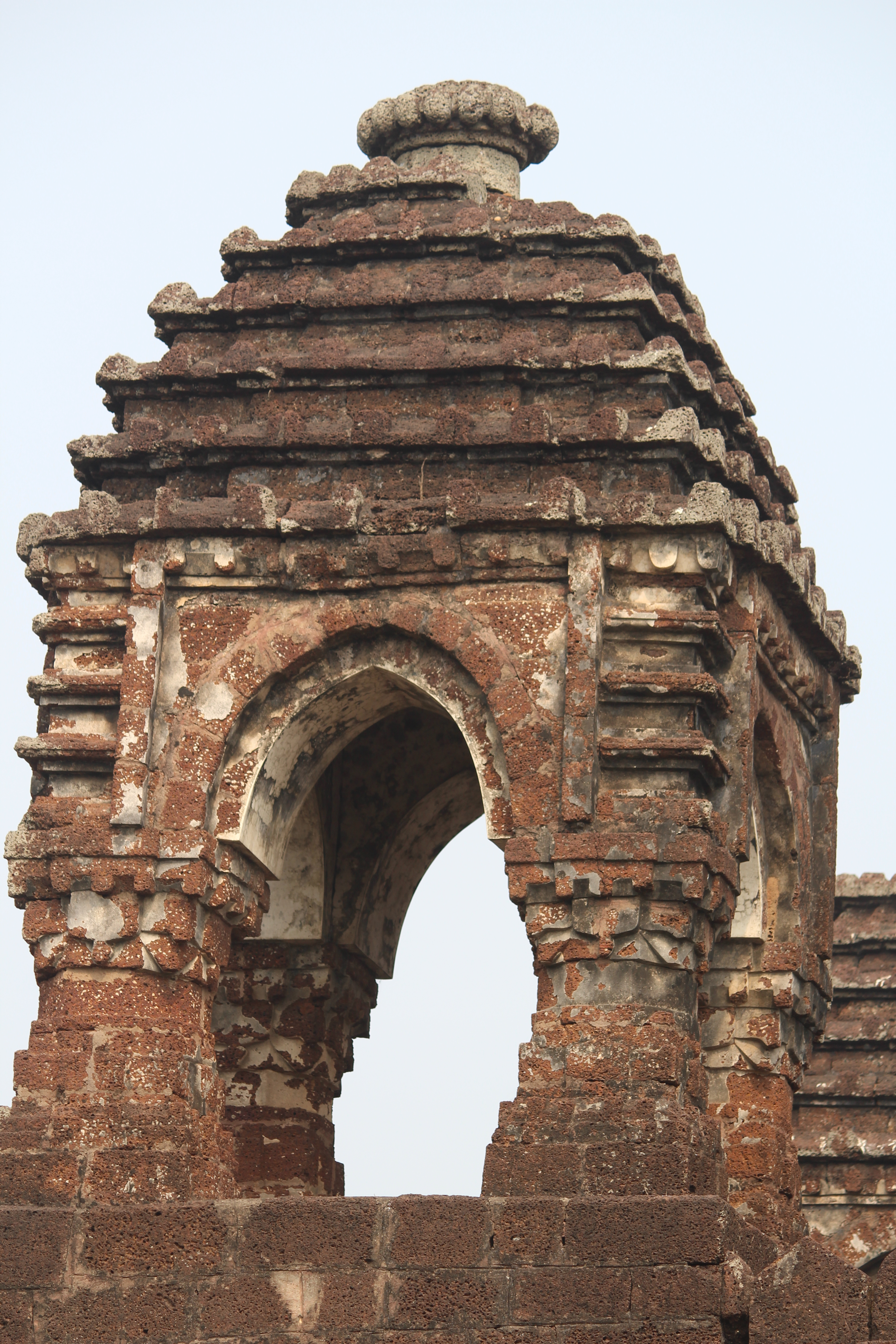
A corner structure

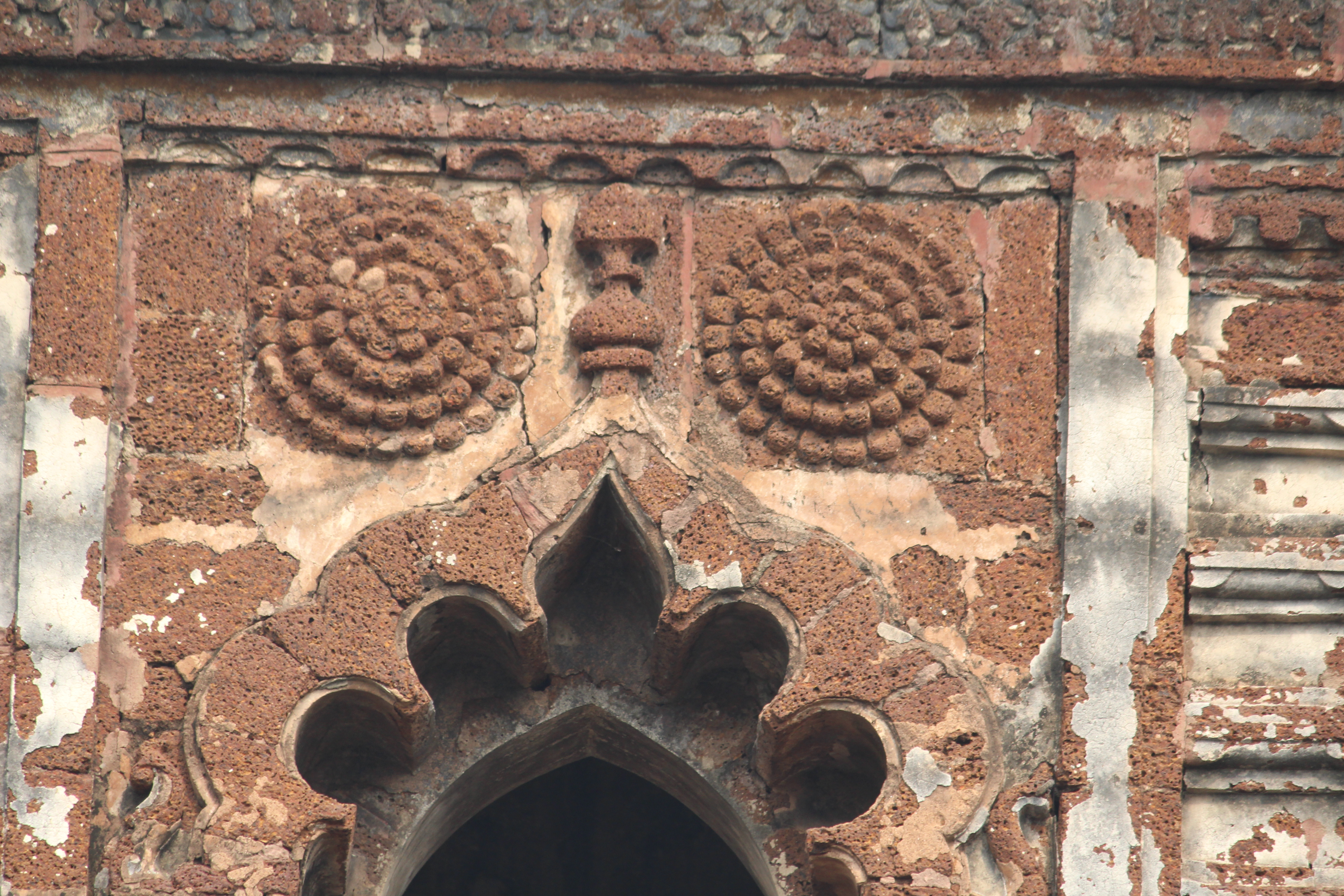
The central top structure doorway

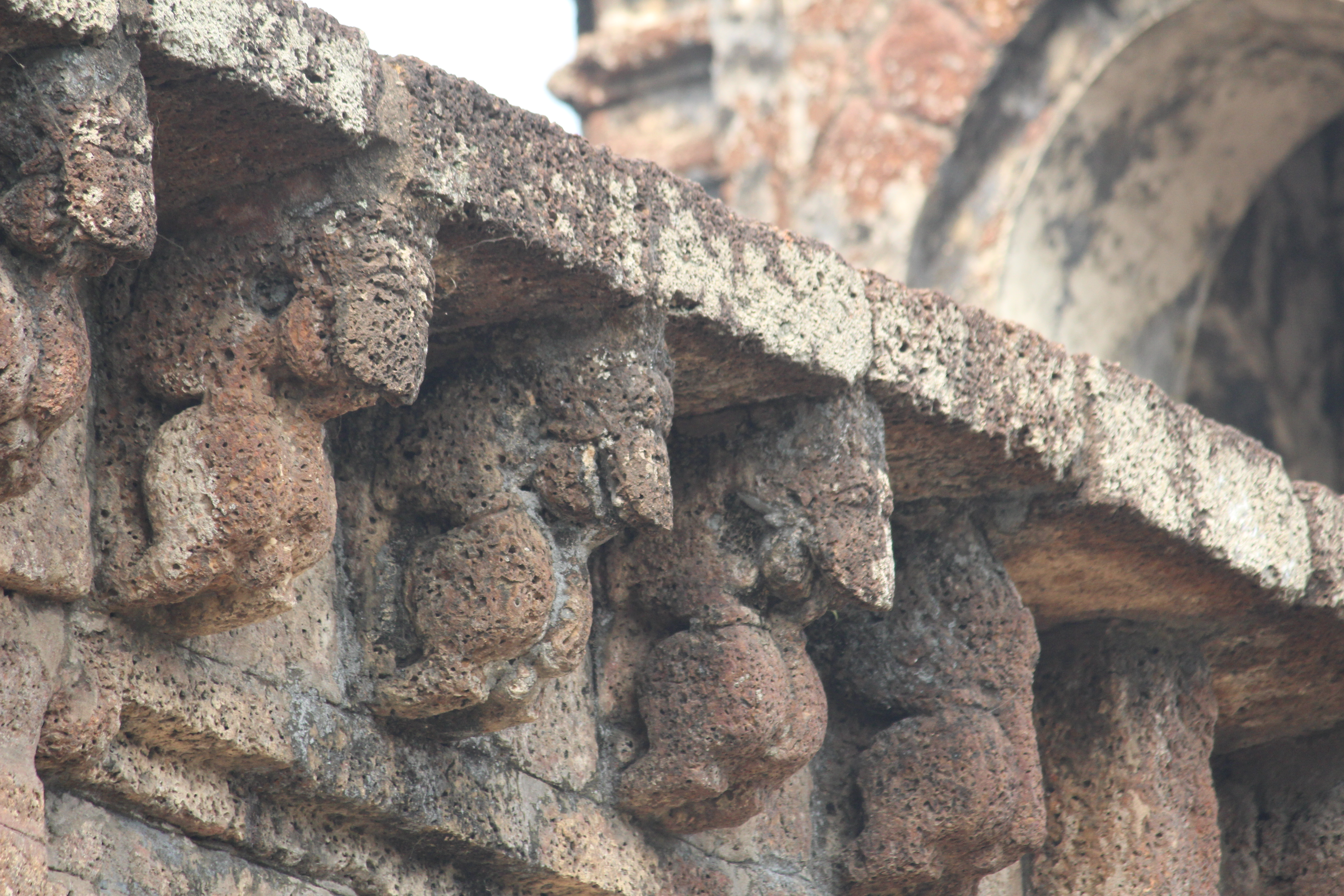
Roof support

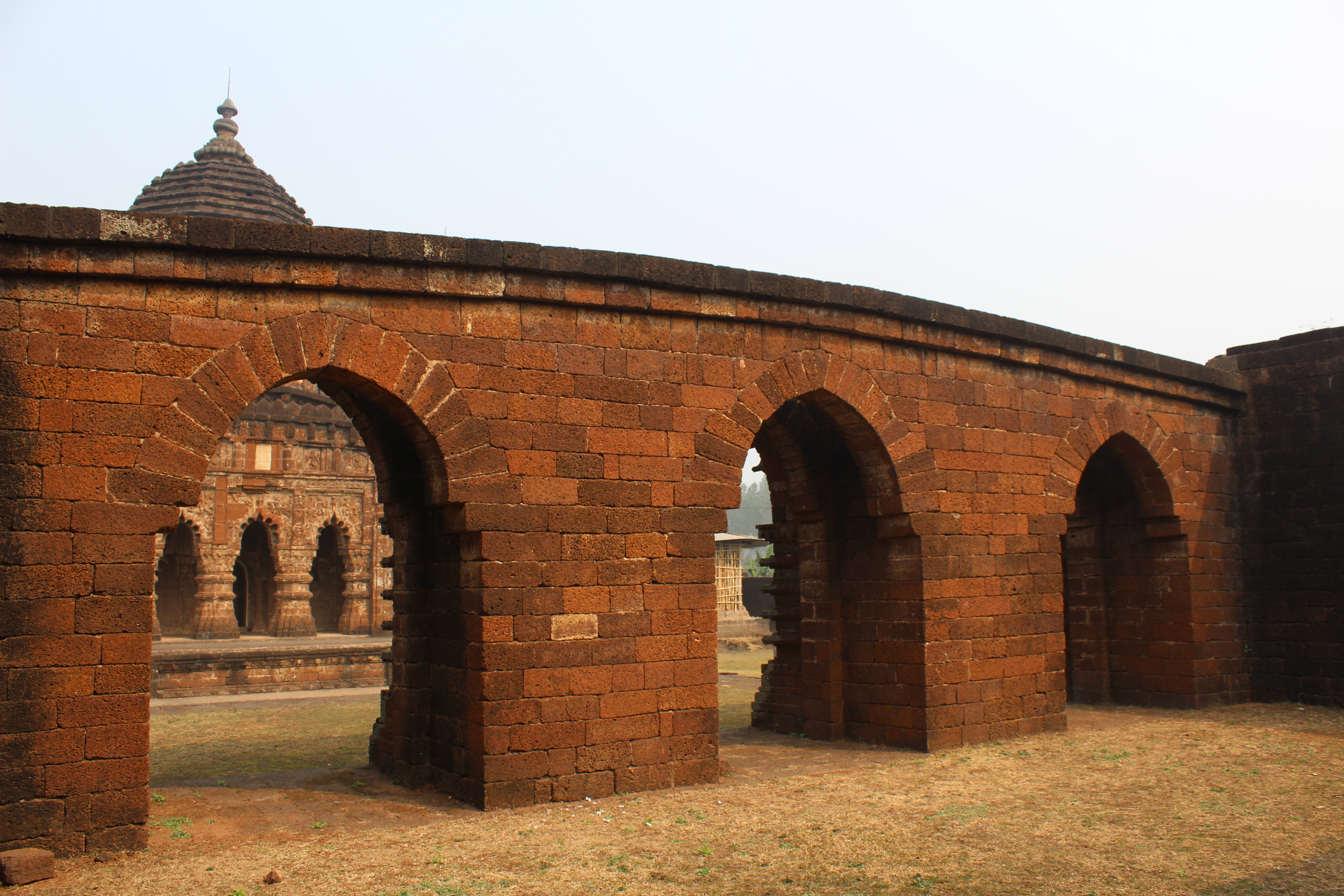
Natmandir

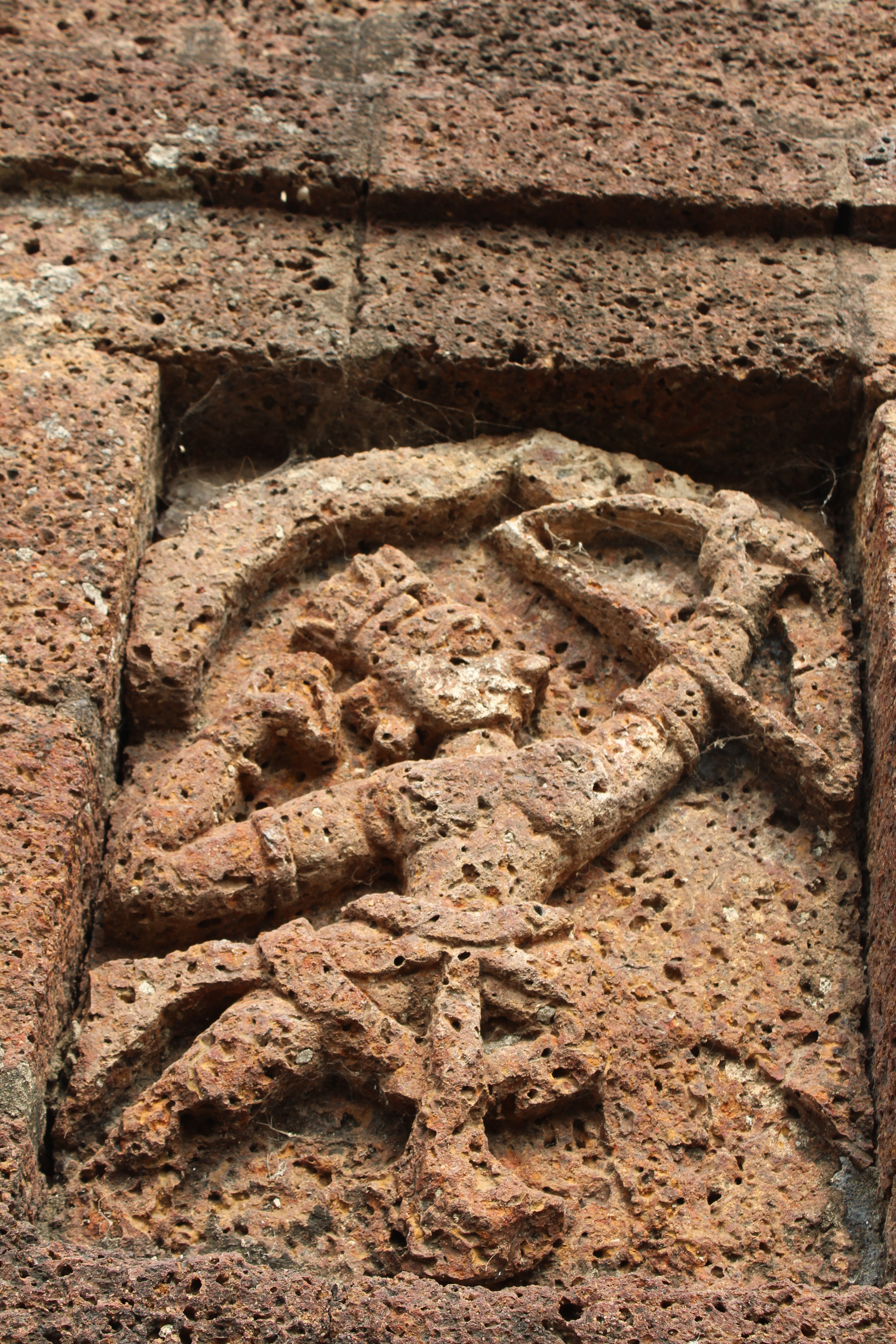
Stone relief

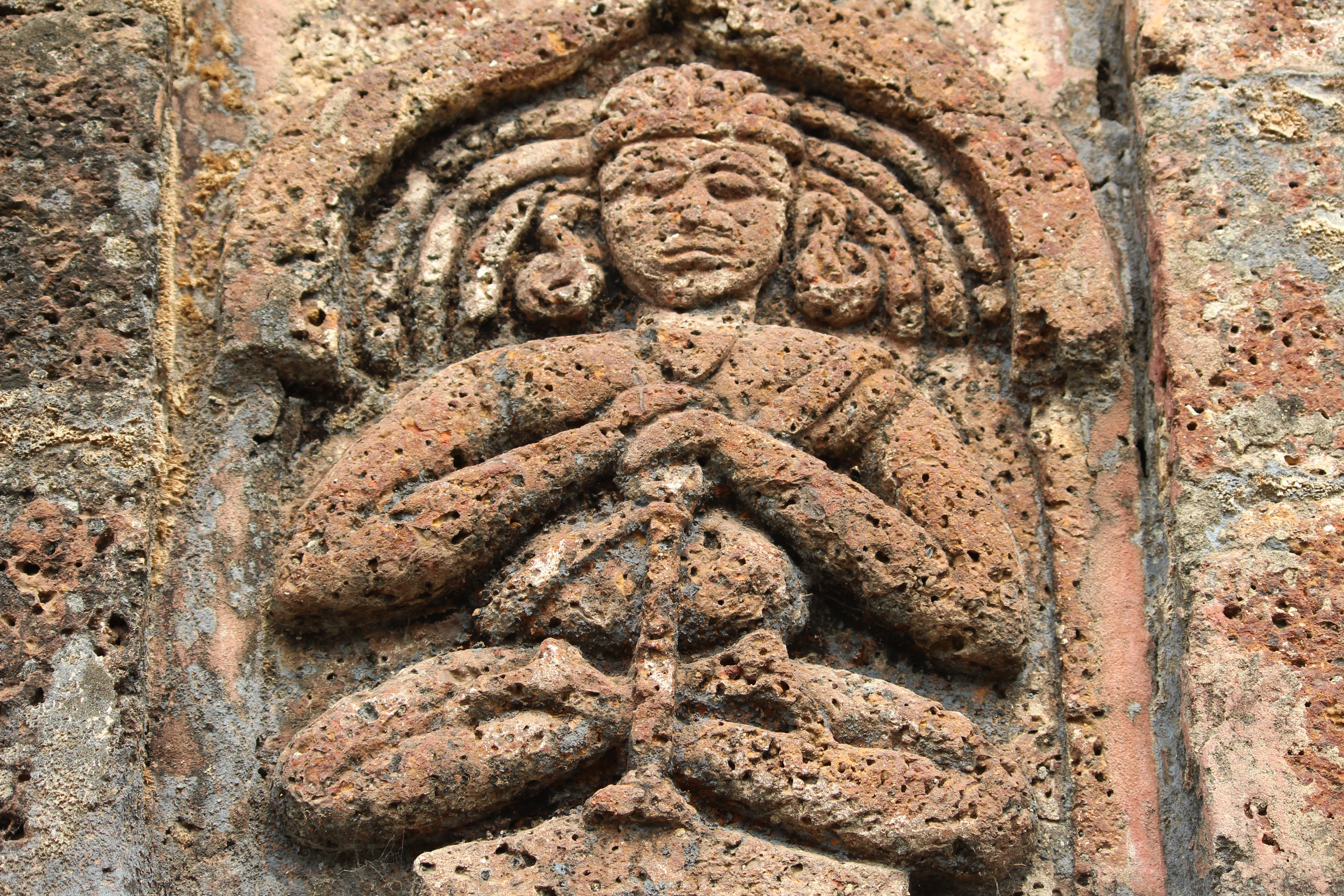
Stone relief

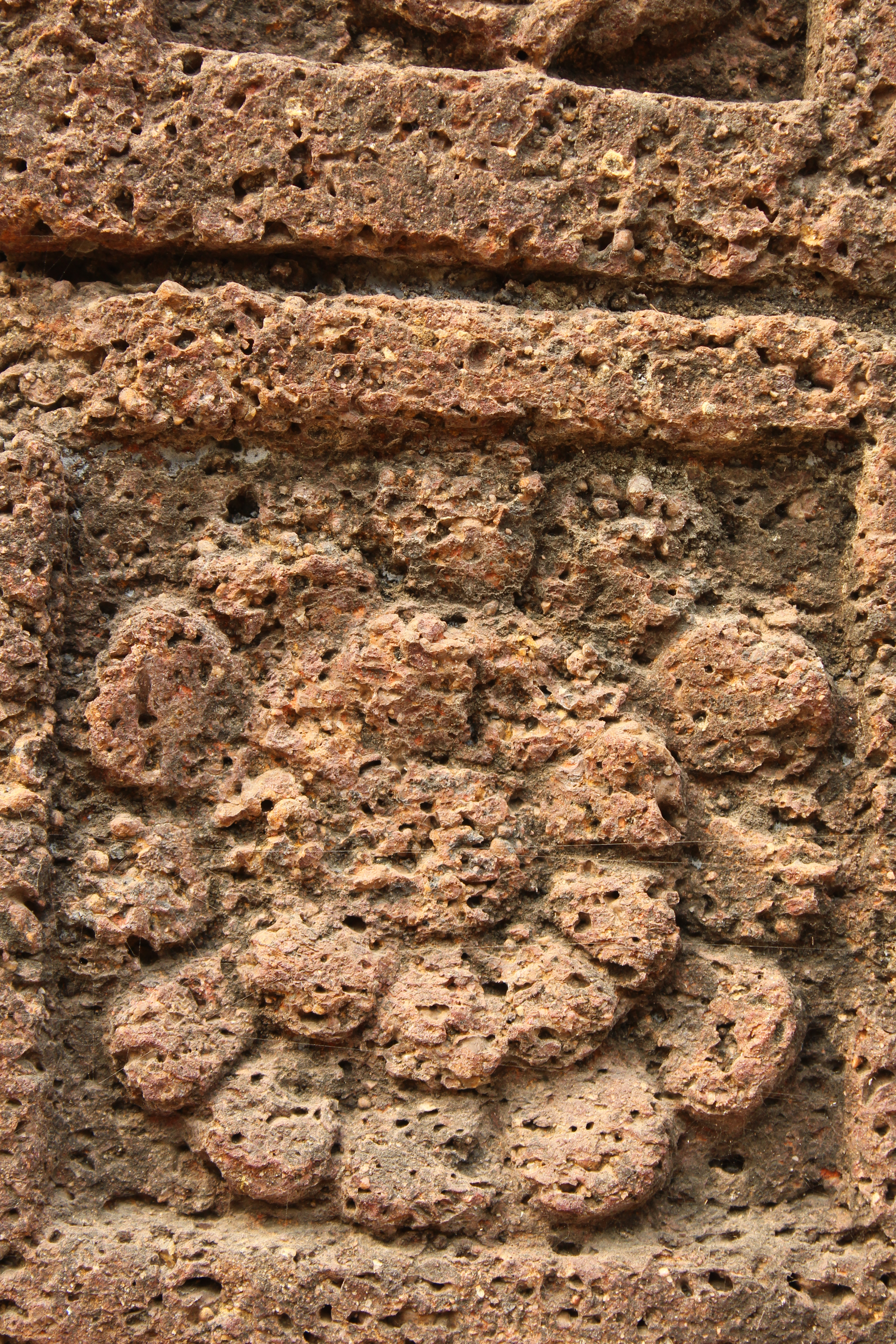
Stone relief

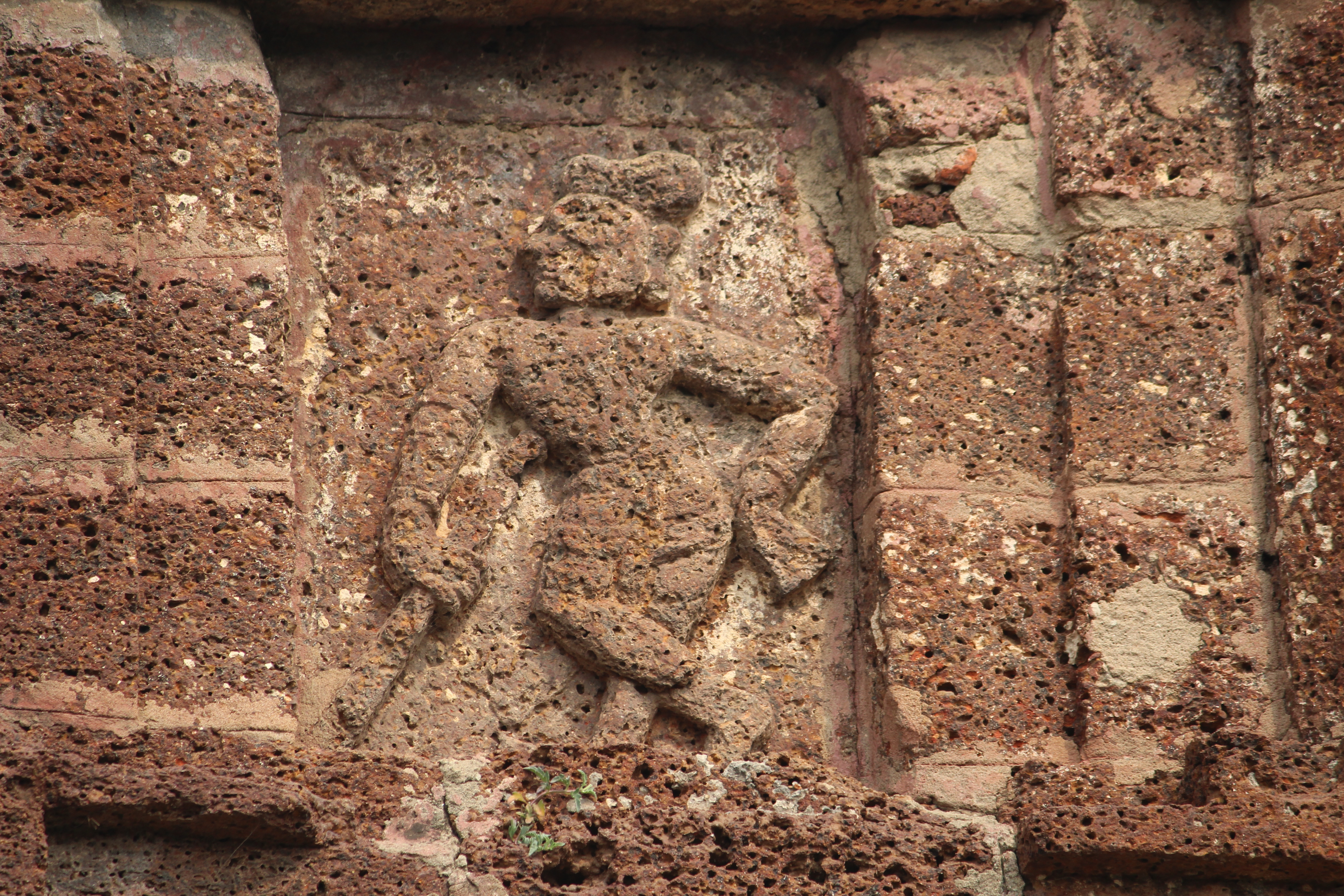
Stone relief

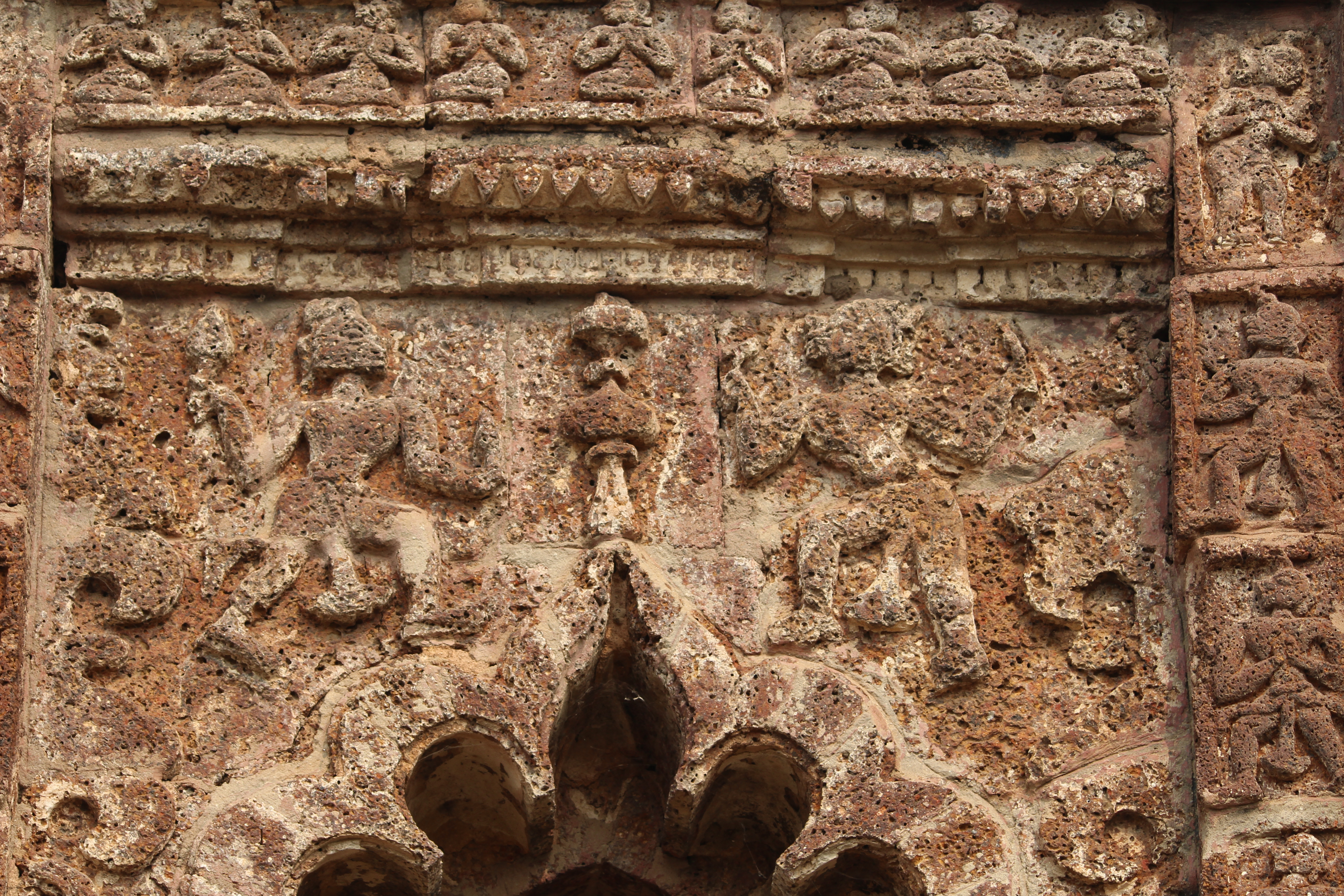
Stone relief

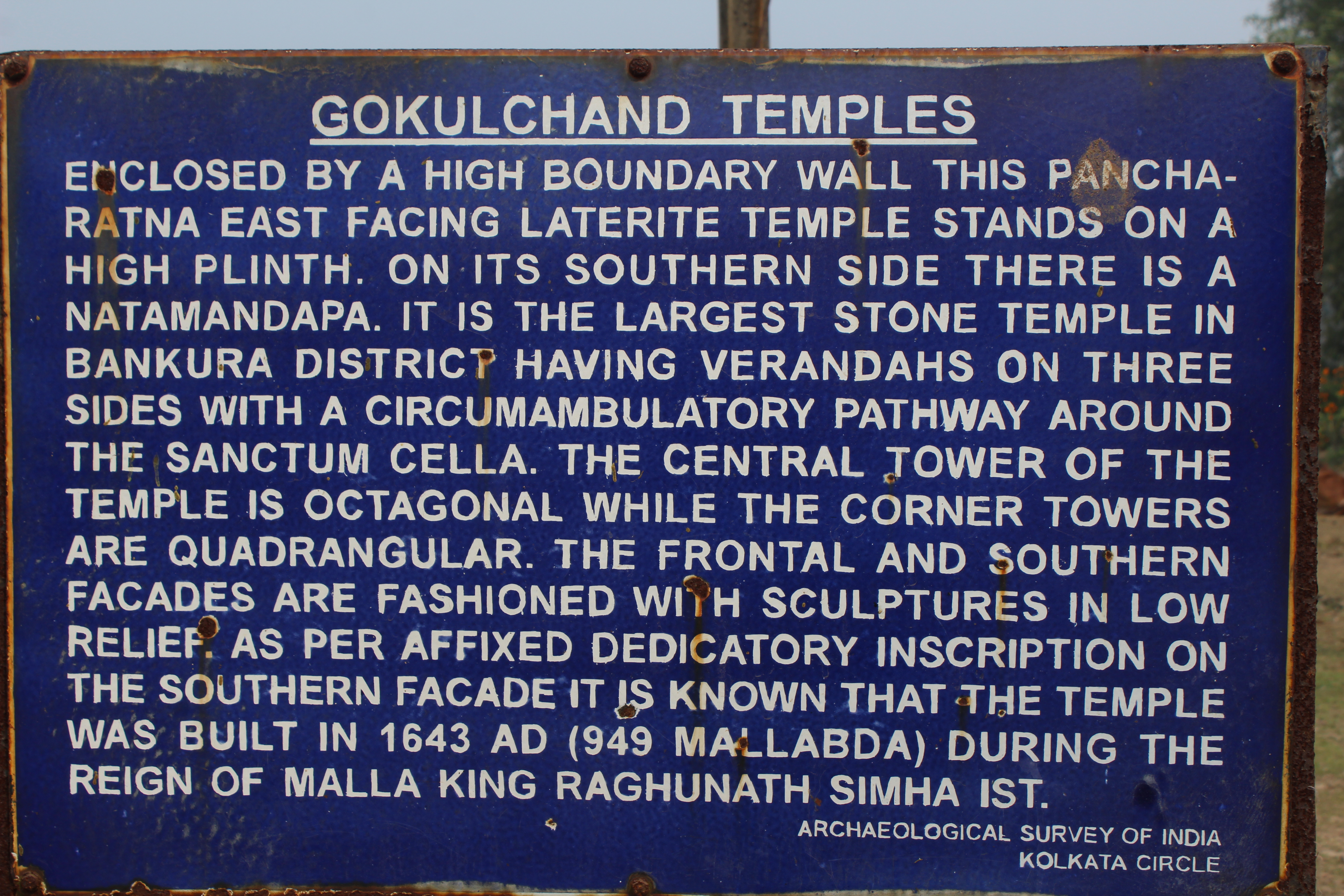
ASI board
