= Joypur, Bankura =

Joypur
- Village
- Location in West Bengal, India Joypur (India)
- Coordinates: 23.0474°N 87.4467°E
- Country: India
- State: West Bengal
- District: Bankura

Population (2011)
  - Total: 3,136

Languages
  - Official: Bengali, English
- Time zone: UTC+5:30 (IST)
- PIN: 722138 (Joypur)
- Telephone/STD code: 03244
- Lok Sabha constituency: Bishnupur
- Vidhan Sabha constituency: Katulpur
- Website: bankura.gov.in

Joypur is a village with a police station in the Joypur CD block in the Bishnupur subdivision of the Bankura district in the state of West Bengal, India.

== Geography ==
Places in Bishnupur subdivision in Bankura district
M: Municipal town, CT: census town, R: rural/ urban centre, T: ancient/ temple centre
Owing to space constraints in the small map, the actual locations in a larger map may vary slightly

=== Location ===
Joypur is located at 23.0474°N 87.4467°E.

=== Area overview ===
The map alongside shows the Bishnupur subdivision of Bankura district. Physiographically, this area has fertile low lying alluvial plains. It is a predominantly rural area with 90.06% of the population living in rural areas and only 8.94% living in the urban areas. It was a part of the core area of Mallabhum.

Note: The map alongside presents some of the notable locations in the subdivision. All places marked in the map are linked in the larger full screen map.

== Civic administration ==
=== Police station ===
Joypur police station has jurisdiction over Joypur CD block. The area covered is 262.74 km^{2} with a population of 139,693.

=== CD block HQ ===
The headquarters of Joypur CD block are located at Joypur.

== Demographics ==
According to the 2011 Census of India, Joypur had a total population of 3,136 of which 1,588 (51%) were males and 1,548 (49%) were females. Population below 6 years was 317. The total number of literates in Joypur was 2,173 (77.08% of the population over 6 years).

== Education ==
- Joypur B.Ed. College is a private non-aided college. It is affiliated to the Baba Saheb Ambedkar Education University and offers courses leading to the Bachelor of Education degree.
- Joypur High School is a Bengali-medium coeducational institution established in 1962.
- Joypur Madhyamik Balika Vidyalaya is a Bengali-medium girls only institution established in 2000.

== Healthcare ==
Joypur Block Primary Health Centre, with 15 beds at Joypur, is the major government medical facility in the Joypur CD block. There are primary health centres at Hijaldiha (with 10 beds), Uttarbar (Magura) (with 10 beds), Hetia (panchayat management) (with 6 beds) and Jagannathpur (with 10 beds).

== Transport ==
State Highway 2 (West Bengal) running from Bankura to Malancha (in North 24 Parganas district) passes through Joypur.

== Gallery ==
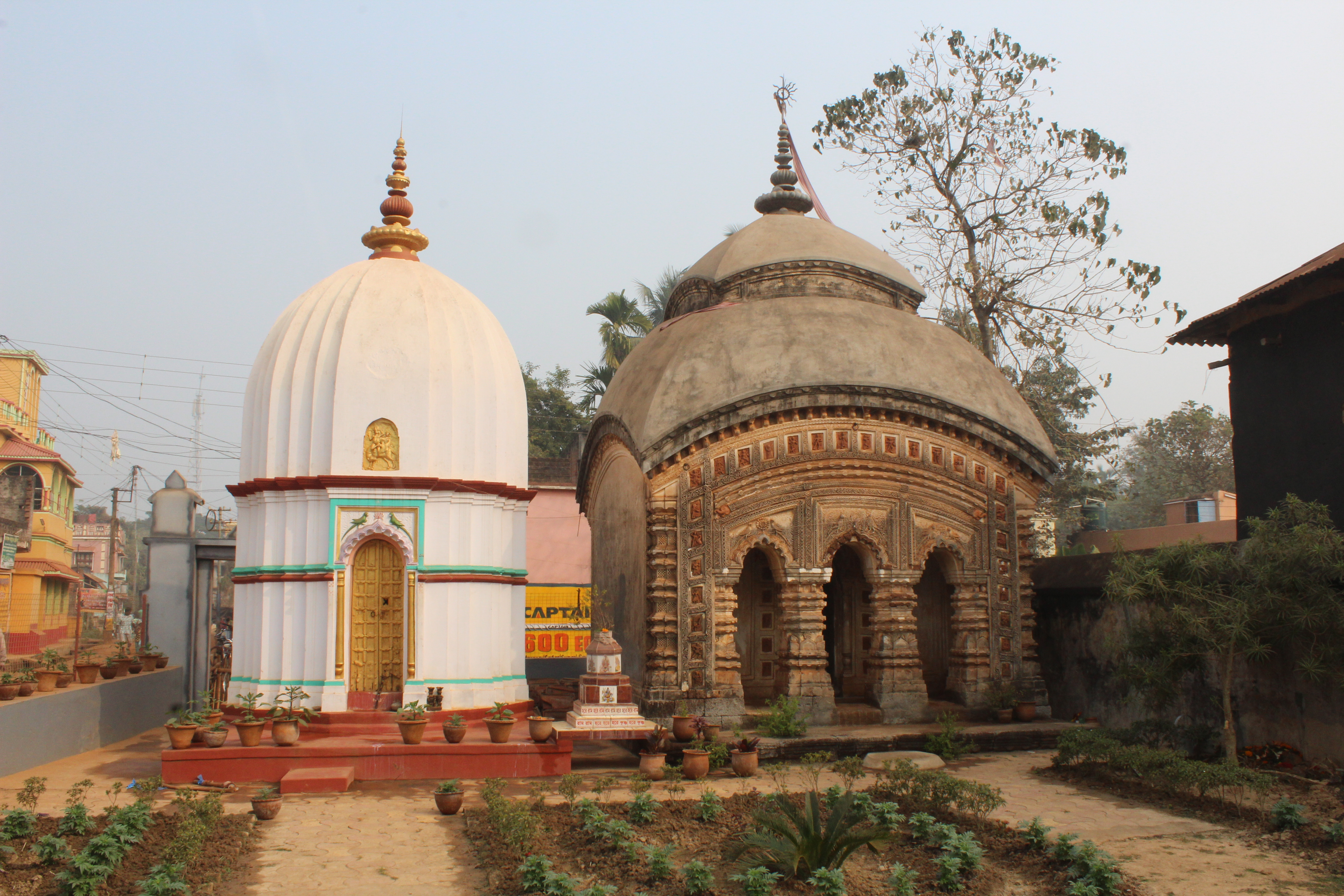
Deul and atchala temple

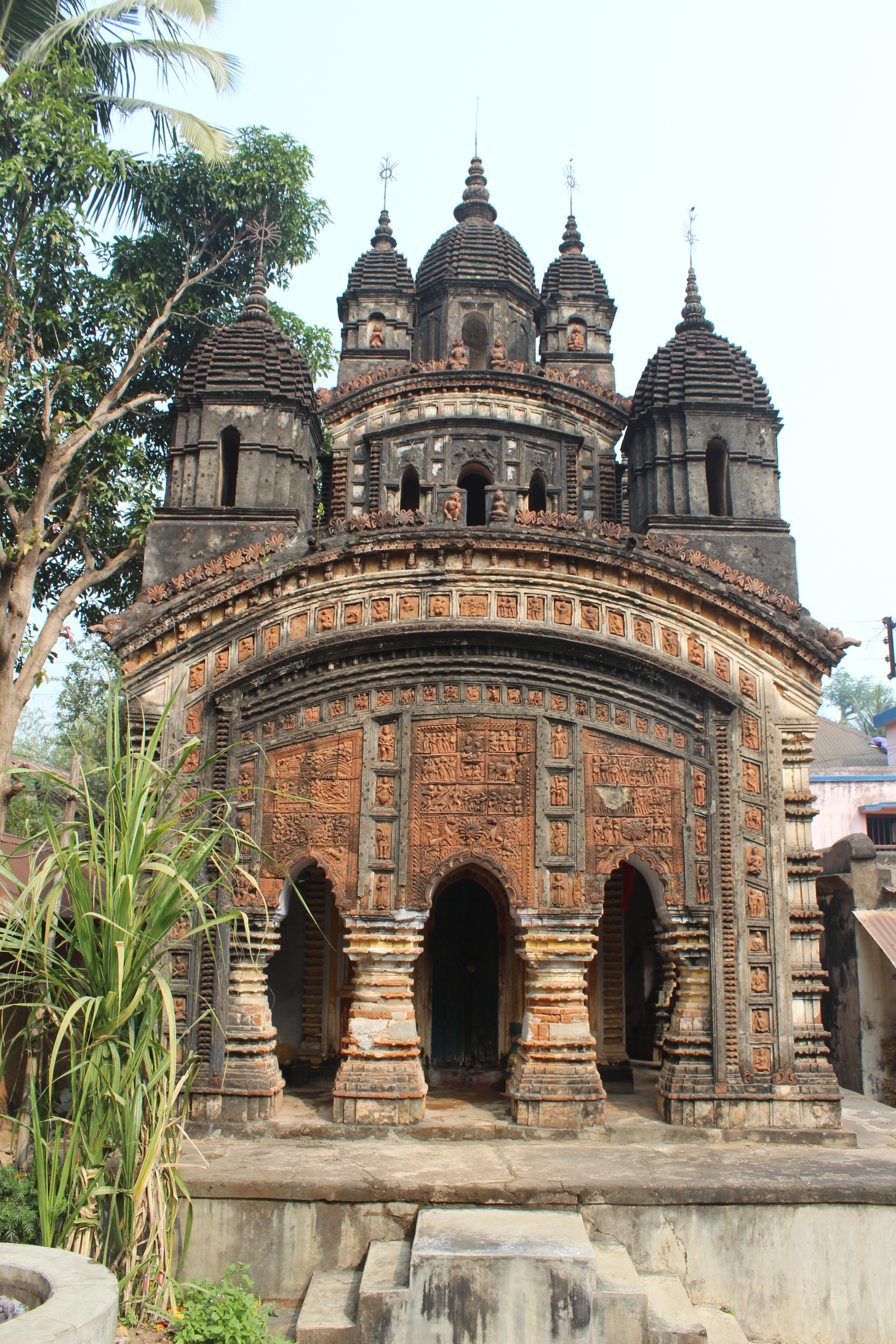
Depara Navaratna temple

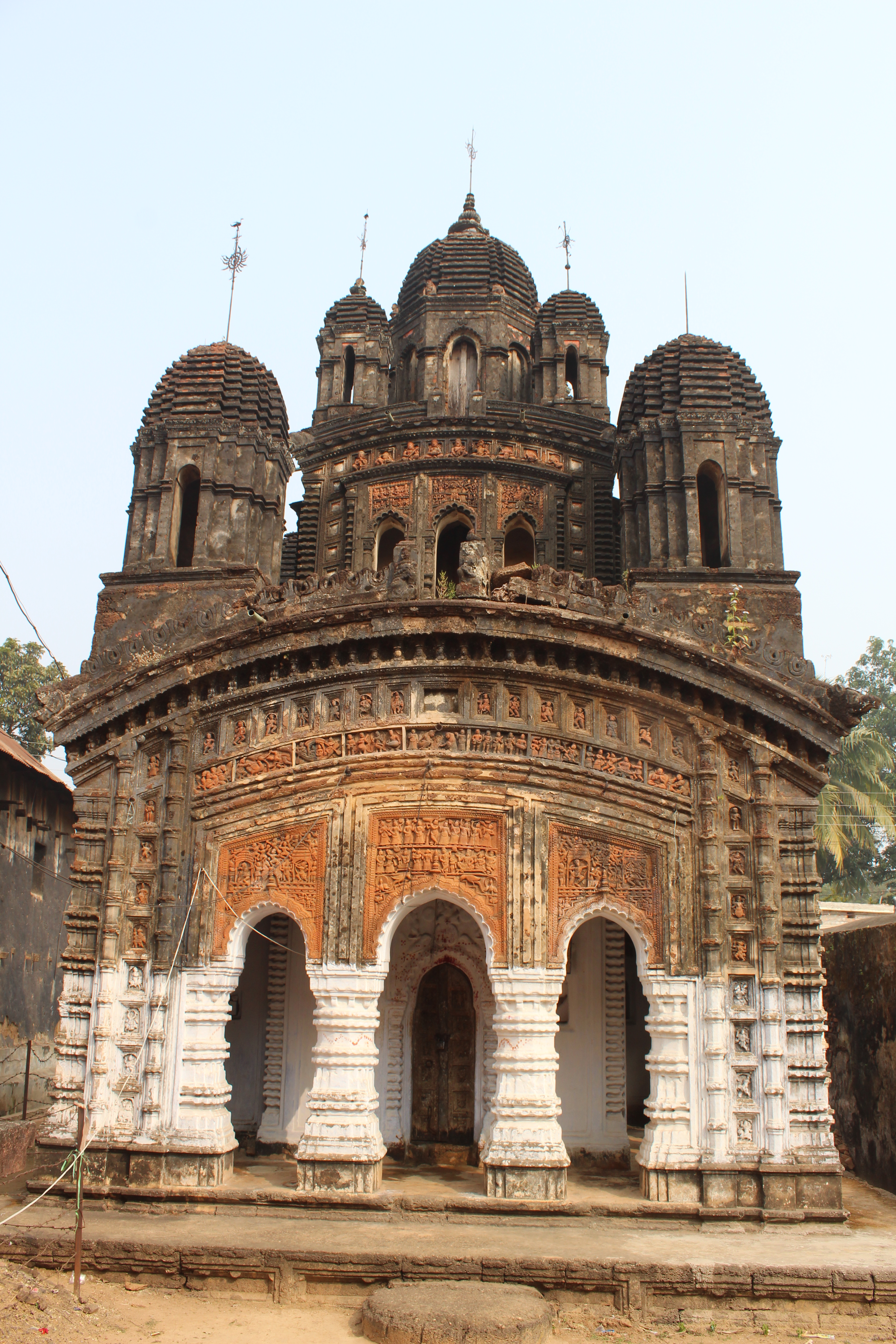
Duttapara Navaratna temple

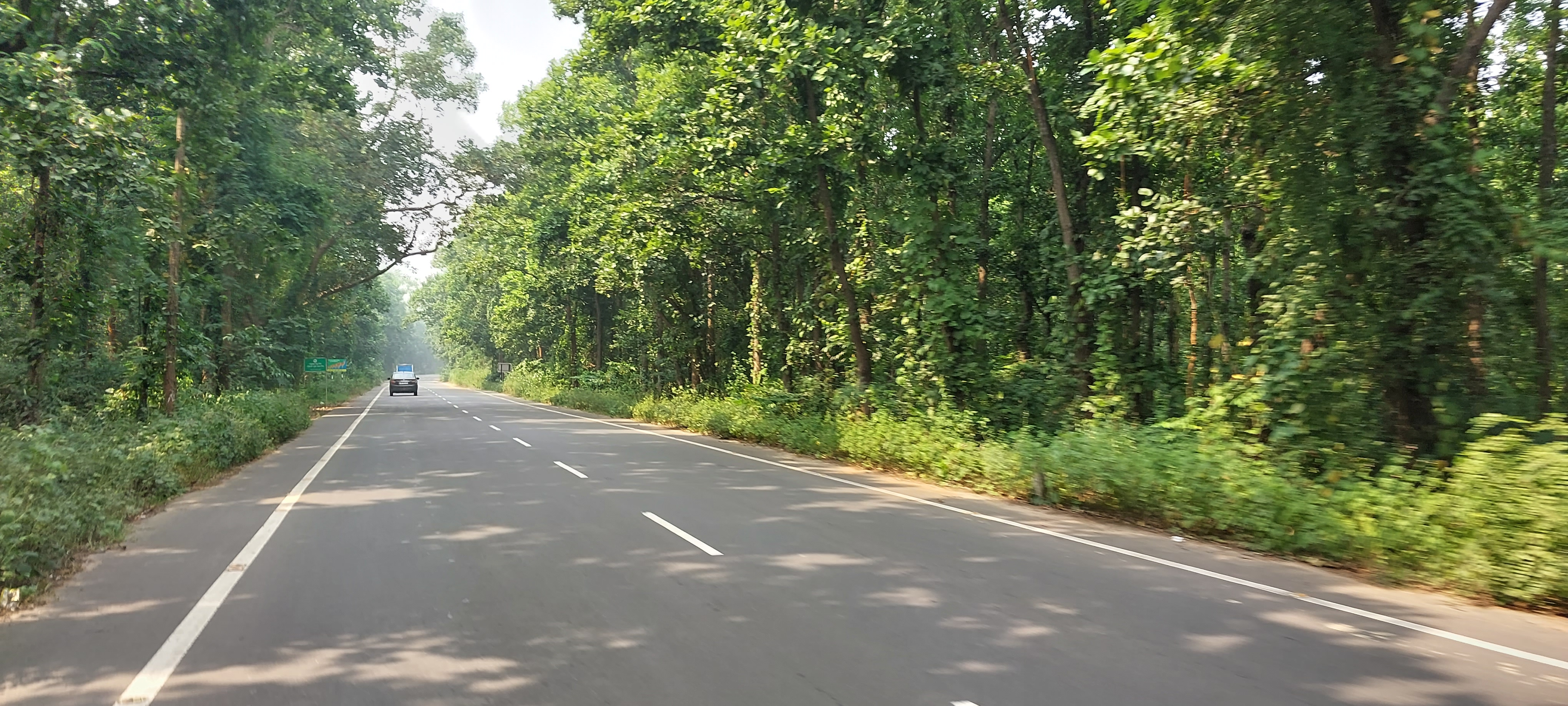
Highway at Joypur forest range

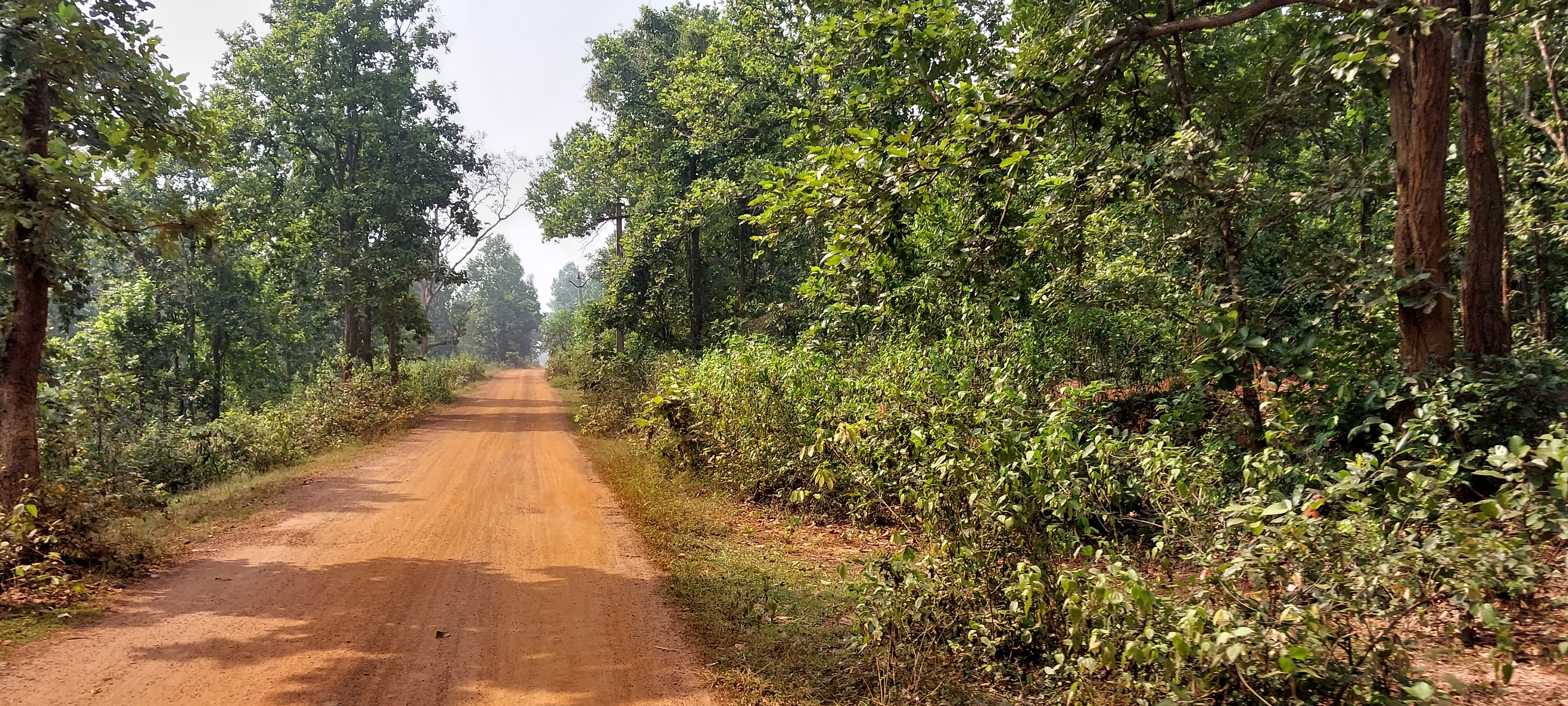
Joypur forest inside

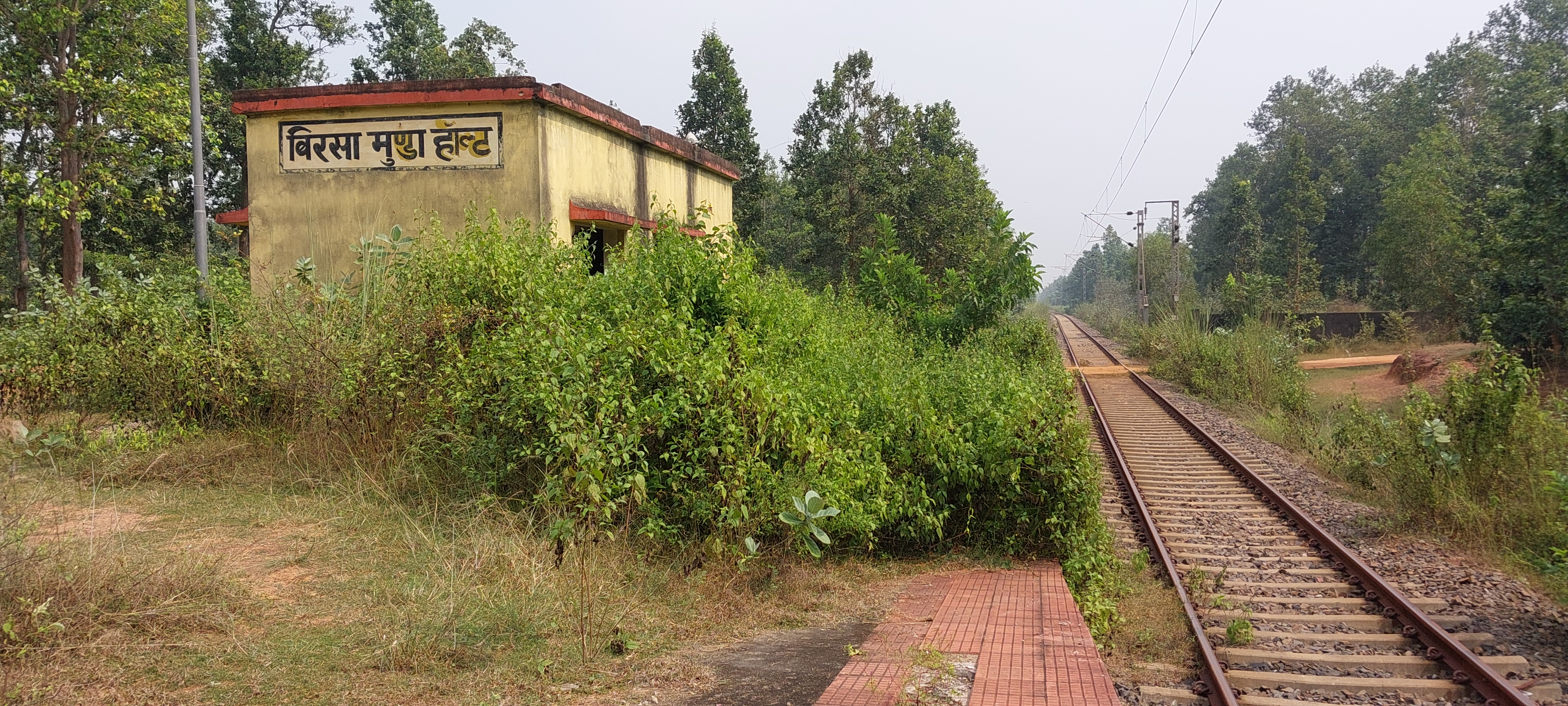
Birshamunda Halt railway station at Joypur, Bankura

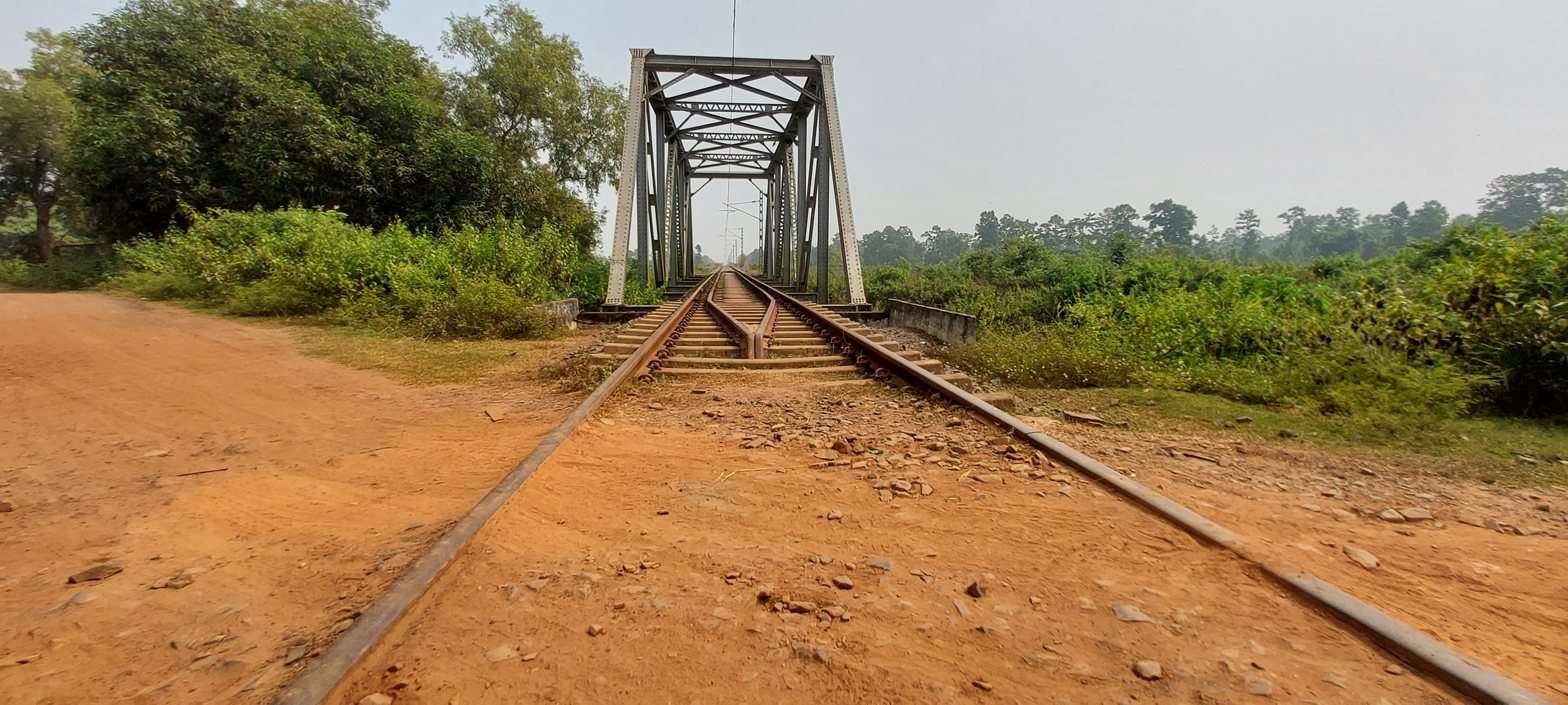
Basudebpur canal bridge in Joypur

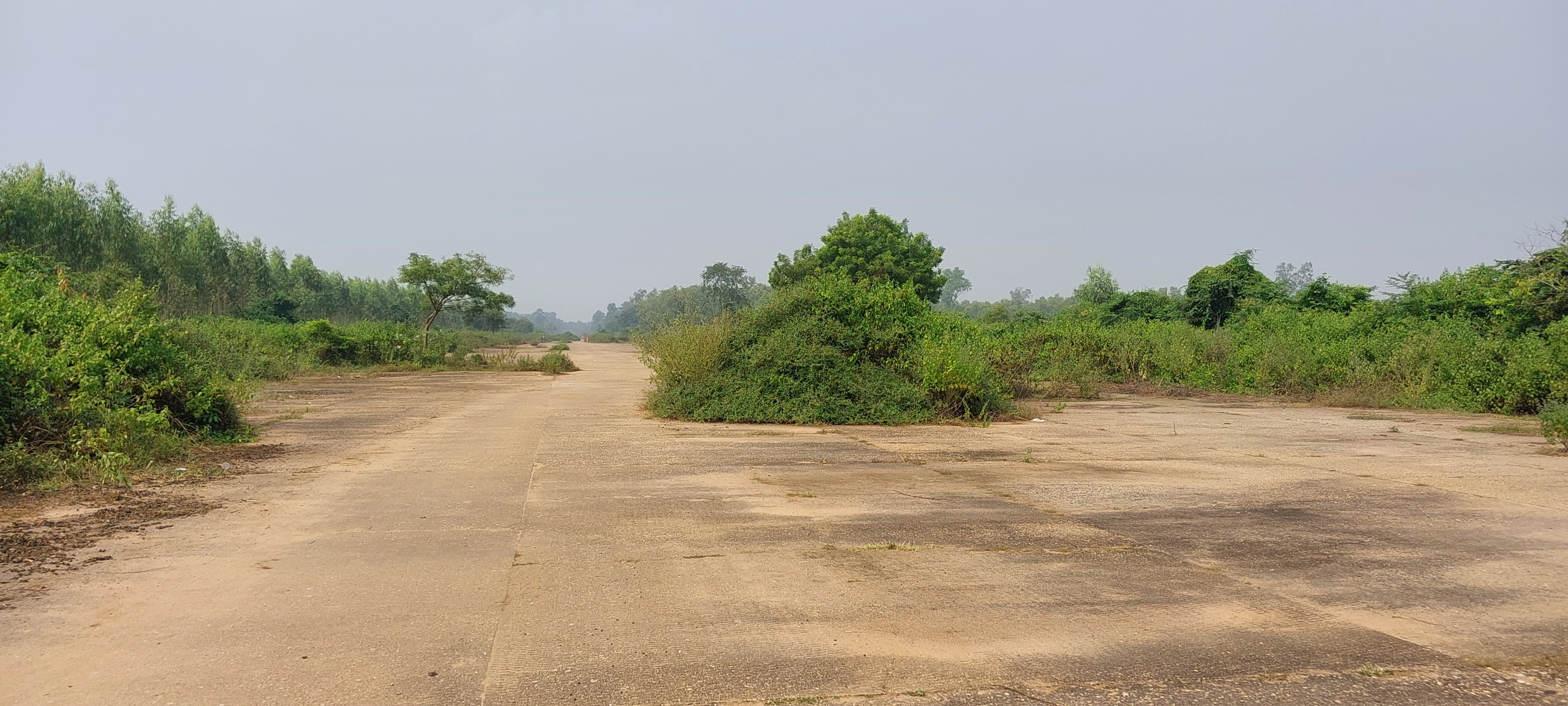
Abandoned US army airfield at Jaypur
