= Patrasayer (community development block) =

- Community development block
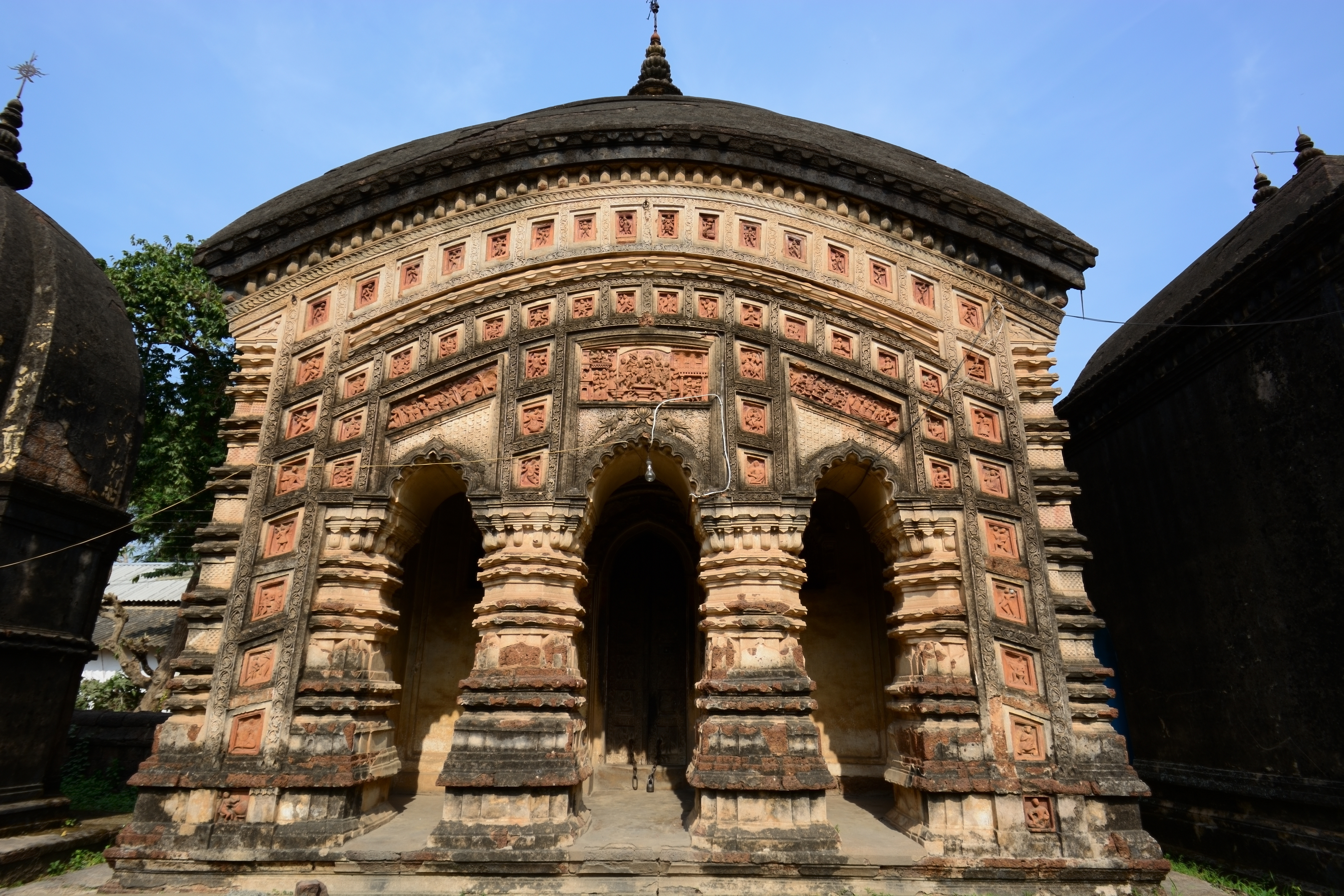
- Raghuveer Temple in Patrasayer

- Coordinates: 23.2167°N 87.5167°E
- Country: India
- State: West Bengal
- District: Bankura

Government
  - Type: Representative democracy

Area
  - Total: 321.07 km^{2} (123.97 sq mi)
- Elevation: 61 m (200 ft)

Population (2011)
  - Total: 184,070
  - Density: 573.30/km^{2} (1,484.8/sq mi)

Languages
  - Official: Bengali, English
- Time zone: UTC+5:30 (IST)
- PIN: 722206 (Patrasayer)
- Telephone/STD code: 03244
- ISO 3166 code: IN-WB
- Vehicle registration: WB-67, WB-68
- Literacy: 64.87%
- Lok Sabha constituency: Bishnupur
- Vidhan Sabha constituency: Indas, Sonamukhi
- Website: patrasayerblock.org

Patrasayer is a community development block (CD block) that forms an administrative division in the Bishnupur subdivision of the Bankura district in the Indian state of West Bengal.

== History ==
=== From Bishnupur kingdom to the British Raj ===
From around the 7th century AD till around the advent of British rule, for around a millennium, history of Bankura district is identical with the rise and fall of the Hindu Rajas of Bishnupur. The Bishnupur Rajas, who were at the summit of their fortunes towards the end of the 17th century, started declining in the first half of the 18th century. First, the Maharaja of Burdwan seized the Fatehpur Mahal, and then the Maratha invasions laid waste their country.

Bishnupur was ceded to the British with the rest of Burdwan chakla in 1760. In 1787, Bishnupur was united with Birbhum to form a separate administrative unit. In 1793 it was transferred to the Burdwan collectorate. In 1879, the district acquired its present shape with the thanas of Khatra and Raipur and the outpost of Simplapal being transferred from Manbhum, and the thanas of Sonamukhi, Kotulpur and Indas being retransferred from Burdwan. However, it was known for sometime as West Burdwan and in 1881 came to be known as Bankura district.

== Geography ==
Map of Bankura District showing CD blocks and municipalities

Patrasayer is located at 23°13′00″N 87°31′00″E.

Patrasayer CD block is located in the eastern part of the district and belongs to the fertile low lying alluvial plains, similar to the predominating rice lands in the adjacent districts of West Bengal. The area is also referred to as Patrasayer plains. Here, the eye constantly rests on wide expanses of rice fields, green in the rains but parched and dry in summer.

Patrasayer CD block is bounded by the Galsi II CD block, in Purba Bardhaman district across the Damodar, on the north, Khandaghosh CD block, in Purba Bardhaman district, and Indas CD block on the east, Joypur CD block on the south and Bishnupur and Sonamukhi CD blocks on the west.

Patrasayer CD block has an area of 322.62 km^{2}. It has 1 panchayat samity, 10 gram panchayats, 134 gram sansads (village councils), 160 mouzas and 151 inhabited villages. Patrasayer police station serves this block. Headquarters of this CD block is at Patrasayer.

Gram panchayats of Patrasayer block/ panchayat samiti are: Balsi I, Balsi II, Belut Rasulpur, Birsingha, Biur Betur, Hamirpur, Jamkuri, Kushadwip, Narayanpur and Patrasayer.

== Demographics ==
=== Population ===
According to the 2011 Census of India, Patrasayer CD block had a total population of 184,070, all of which were rural. There were 93,614 (51%) males and 90,456 (49%) females. Population in the age range of 0 to 6 years was 21,226. Scheduled Castes numbered 85,501 (46.45%) and Scheduled Tribes numbered 5,533 (3.01%).

According to the 2001 census, Patrasayer block had a total population of 164,048, out of which 83,432 were males and 80,616 were females. Patrasayer block registered a population growth of 16.68 per cent during the 1991-2001 decade. Decadal growth for the district was 15.15 per cent. Decadal growth in West Bengal was 17.84 per cent.

Large villages (with 4,000+ population) in Patrasayer CD block are (2011 census figures in brackets): Kantaban (4,209), Patrasair (10,844), Chak Patra Saer (5,100), Biur (4,105) and Birsinha (5,231).

Other villages in Patrasayer CD block are (2011 census figures in brackets): Jamkuri (3,348), Rasulpur (3,266), Belut (2,780), Hamirpur (2,635), Balsi Purbapara (1,516), Balsi Dakshinpara (1,003), Jamkuri (3,341), Kushadwip (1,943), Hadal Narayanpur (487 + 1148) and Patit Dommahal (3,971).

=== Literacy ===
According to the 2011 census the total number of literates in Patrasayer CD block was 105,629 (64.87% of the population over 6 years) out of which males numbered 60,755 (73.46% of the male population over 6 years) and females numbered 44,874 (56.00%) of the female population over 6 years). The gender disparity (the difference between female and male literacy rates) was 17.46%.

See also – List of West Bengal districts ranked by literacy rate

Literacy in CD blocks of
Bankura district
Bankura Sadar subdivision
Saltora – 61.45%
Mejia – 66.83%
Gangajalghati – 68.11%
Chhatna – 65.73%
Bankura I – 68.74%
Bankura II – 73.59%
Barjora – 71.67%
Onda – 65.82%
Bishnupur subdivision
Indas – 71.70%
Joypur – 74.57%
Patrasayer – 64.8%
Kotulpur – 78.01%
Sonamukhi – 66.16%
Bishnupur – 66.30%
Khatra subdivision
Indpur – 67.42%
Ranibandh – 68.53%
Khatra – 72.18%
Hirbandh – 64.18%
Raipur – 71.33%
Sarenga – 74.25%
Simlapal – 68.44%
Taldangra – 70.87%
2011 Census: CD Block Wise

Primary Census Abstract Data

=== Language and religion ===
Religion in Patrasayer CD block (2011)
Hinduism	85.20%
Islam	12.58%
Other (tribal religion)	2.10%
Other or not stated	0.12%

In the 2011 census Hindus numbered 156,826 and formed 85.20% of the population in Patrasayer CD block. Muslims numbered 23,160 and formed 12.58% of the population. Others numbered 4,084 and formed 2.22% of the population. Others include Addi Bassi, Marang Boro, Santal, Saranath, Sari Dharma, Sarna, Alchchi, Bidin, Sant, Saevdharm, Seran, Saran, Sarin, Kheria, and other religious communities. In 2001, Hindus were 86.38%, Muslims 11.25% and tribal religion followers 2.07% of the population respectively.

Languages of Patrasayer CD block (2011)
1. Bengali (97.4%)
2. Santali (2.55%)
3. Others (0.09%)

At the time of the 2011 census, 97.36% of the population spoke Bengali and 2.55% Santali as their first language.

== Rural poverty ==
In Patrasayer CD block 37.63% families were living below poverty line in 2007. According to the Rural Household Survey in 2005, 28.87% of the total number of families were BPL families in the Bankura district.

== Economy ==
=== Livelihood ===
Livelihood
in Patrasayer CD block
1. Cultivators (23.2%)
2. Agricultural labourers (53.5%)
3. Household industries (4.27%)
4. Other Workers (19.0%)

In the Patrasayer CD block in 2011, among the class of total workers, cultivators numbered 18,441 and formed 23.22%, agricultural labourers numbered 42,494 and formed 53.51%, household industry workers numbered 3,391 and formed 4.27% and other workers numbered 15,093 and formed 19.00%. Total workers numbered 79,419 and formed 43.15% of the total population, and non-workers numbered 104,651 and formed 56.85% of the population.

Note: In the census records a person is considered a cultivator, if the person is engaged in cultivation/ supervision of land owned by self/government/institution. When a person who works on another person's land for wages in cash or kind or share, is regarded as an agricultural labourer. Household industry is defined as an industry conducted by one or more members of the family within the household or village, and one that does not qualify for registration as a factory under the Factories Act. Other workers are persons engaged in some economic activity other than cultivators, agricultural labourers and household workers. It includes factory, mining, plantation, transport and office workers, those engaged in business and commerce, teachers, entertainment artistes and so on.

=== Infrastructure ===
There are 151 inhabited villages in the Patrasayer CD block, as per the District Census Handbook, Bankura, 2011. 100% villages have power supply. 150 villages (99.34%) have drinking water supply. 20 villages (13.25%) have post offices. 146 villages (96.69%) have telephones (including landlines, public call offices and mobile phones). 48 villages (31.79%) have pucca (paved) approach roads and 46 villages (30.46%) have transport communication (includes bus service, rail facility and navigable waterways). 17 villages (11.26%) have agricultural credit societies and 9 villages (5.96%) have banks.

=== Agriculture ===
There were 99 fertiliser depots, 12 seed stores and 48 fair price shops in the CD block.

In 2013-14, persons engaged in agriculture in Patrasayer CD block could be classified as follows: bargadars 13.86%, patta (document) holders 20.65%, small farmers (possessing land between 1 and 2 hectares) 4.82%, marginal farmers (possessing land up to 1 hectare) 15.68% and agricultural labourers 44.99%.

In 2003-04 net area sown Patrasayer CD block was 16,413 hectares and the area in which more than one crop was grown was 5,000 hectares.

In 2013-14, the total area irrigated in Patrasayer CD Block was 17,867 hectares, out of which 7,727 hectares was by canal water, 225 hectares by tank water, 980 hectares by river lift irrigation, 438 hectares by deep tube well, 8,432 hectares by shallow tubewell, 55 hectares by open dug wells and 10 hectares by other methods.

In 2013-14, Patrasayer CD block produced 3,390 tonnes of Aman paddy, the main winter crop, from 1,405 hectares, 7,964 tonnes of Aus paddy from 3,191 hectares, 16,859 tonnes of Boro paddy from 4,851 hectares, 293 tonnes of wheat from 152 hectares and 12,578,000 tonnes of potatoes from 2,030 hectares. It also produced pulses and mustard.

=== Handloom and pottery industries ===
The handloom industry engages the largest number of persons in the non farm sector and hence is important in Bankura district. The handloom industry is well established in all the CD blocks of the district and includes the famous Baluchari saris. In 2004-05 Patrasayer CD block had 546 silk looms in operation.

Bankura district is famous for the artistic excellence of its pottery products that include the famous Bankura horse. The range of pottery products is categorised as follows: domestic utilities, terracota and other decorative items and roofing tiles and other heavy pottery items. Around 3,200 families were involved in pottery making in the district in 2002. 225 families were involved in Patrasayer CD block.

=== Banking ===
In 2013-14, Patrasayer CD block had offices of 7 commercial banks and 3 gramin banks. 1 District central Co-Operative Bank

=== Backward Regions Grant Fund ===
The Bankura district is listed as a backward region and receives financial support from the Backward Regions Grant Fund. The fund, created by the Government of India, is designed to redress regional imbalances in development. As of 2012, 272 districts across the country were listed under this scheme. The list includes 11 districts of West Bengal.

== Transport ==
In 2013-14, Patrasayer CD block had 2 ferry services and 11 originating/ terminating bus routes.

DEMU services are available between Bankura and Masagram on the Bankura-Masagram line. There are stations at Kumrul, Betur, Patrasayer and Dhagaria.

The State Highway 8 (West Bengal) running from Santaldih (in Purulia district) to Majhdia (in Nadia district) passes through this CD block.

== Education ==
In 2013-14, Patrasayer CD block had 143 primary schools with 15,294 students, 17 middle schools with 2,258 students, 7 high schools with 3,825 students and 14 higher secondary schools with 14,021 students. Patrasayer CD block had 1 general college with 1,215 students and 305 institutions for special and non-formal education with 10,303 students.

See also – Education in India

According to the 2011 census, in the Patrasayer CD block, among the 151 inhabited villages, 18 villages did not have a school, 34 villages had two or more primary schools, 37 villages had at least 1 primary and 1 middle school and 22 villages had at least 1 middle and 1 secondary school.

Patrasayer Mahavidyalaya was established in 2005 at Patrasayer

== Culture ==
The Patrasayer CD block has several heritage temples.

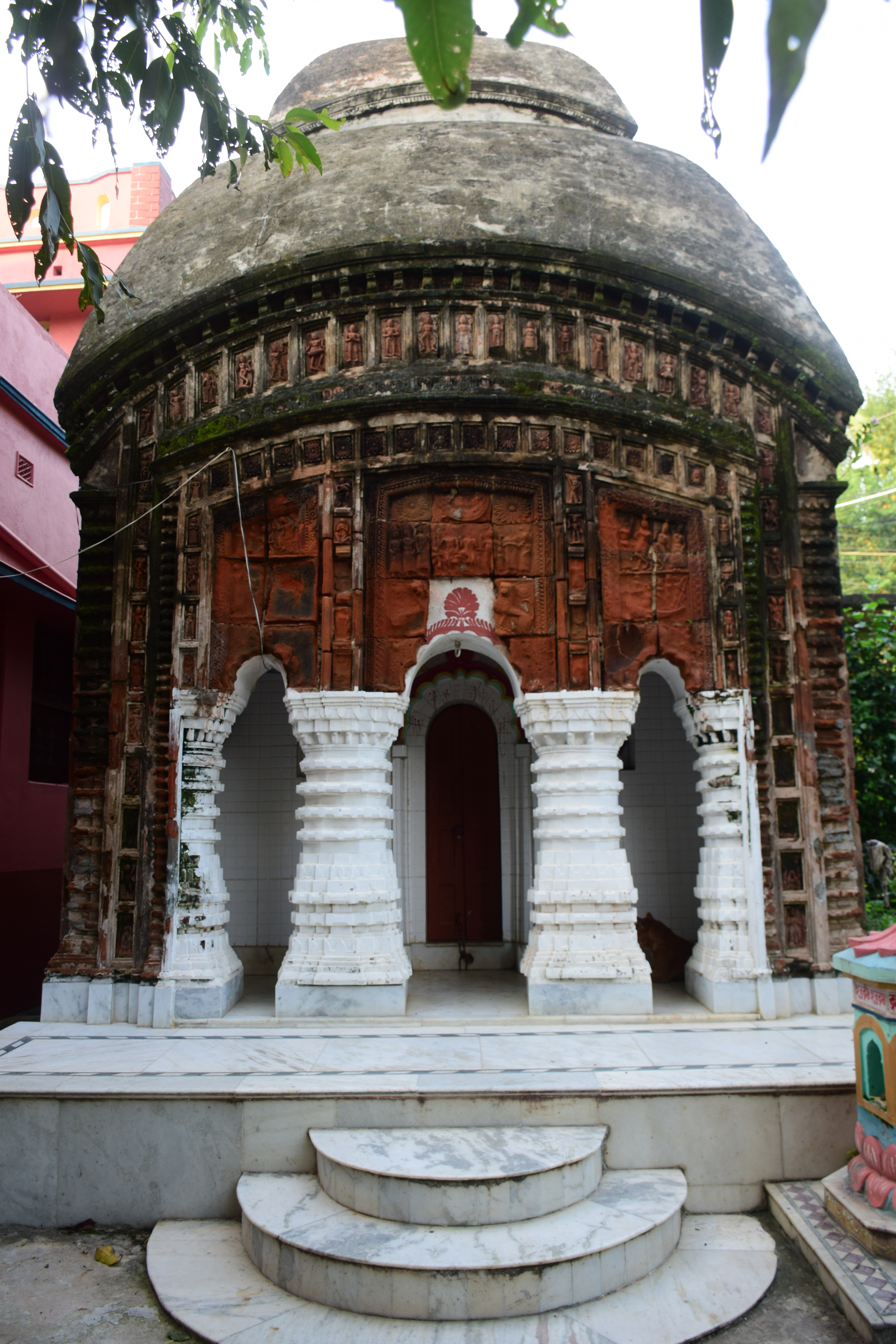
Patit Dommahal: At chala Sridhar temple built in the 19th century.

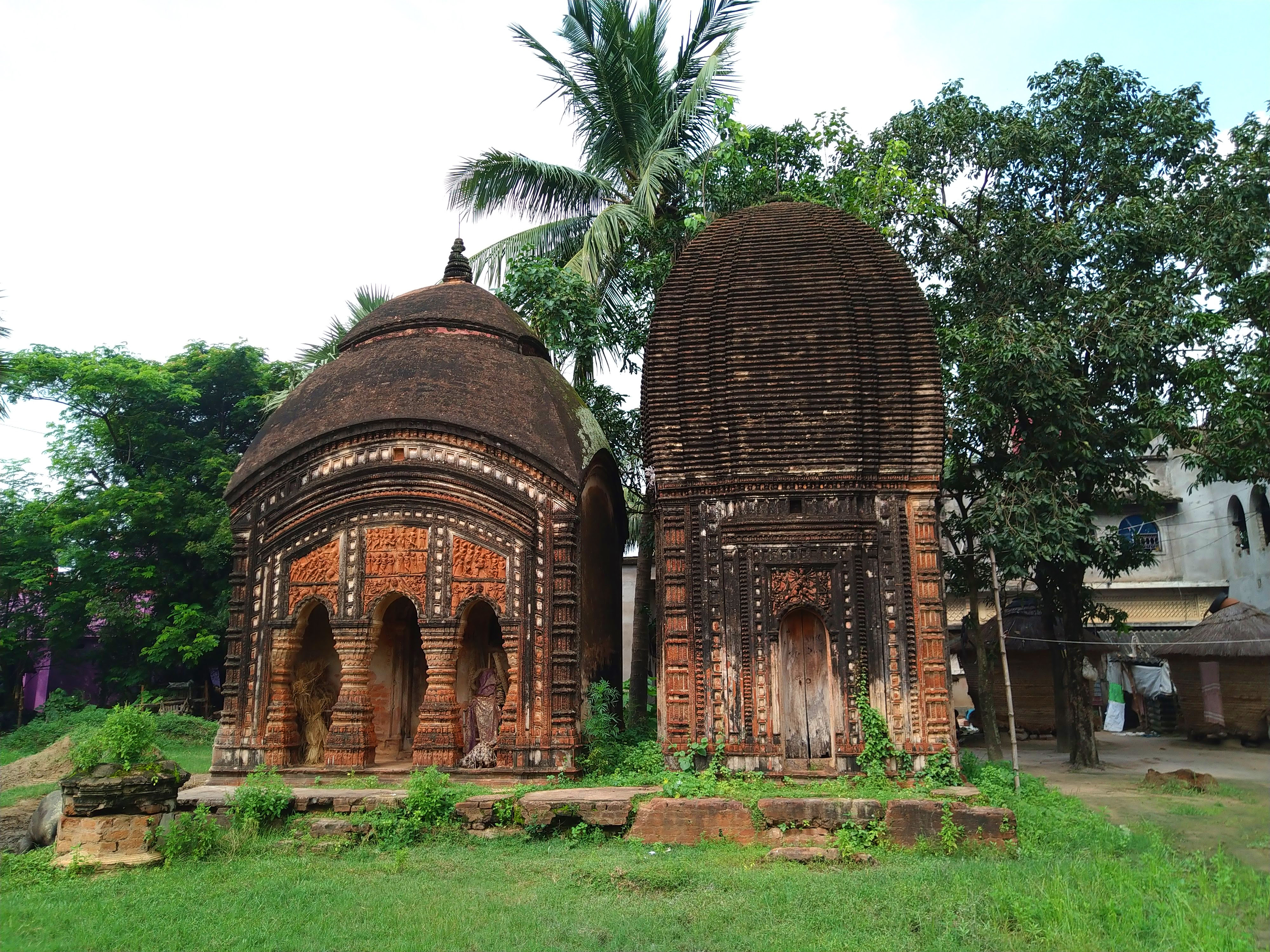
Balsi Purbapara: At chala Shiva temple, Vishnu deul, both with terracotta decoration.

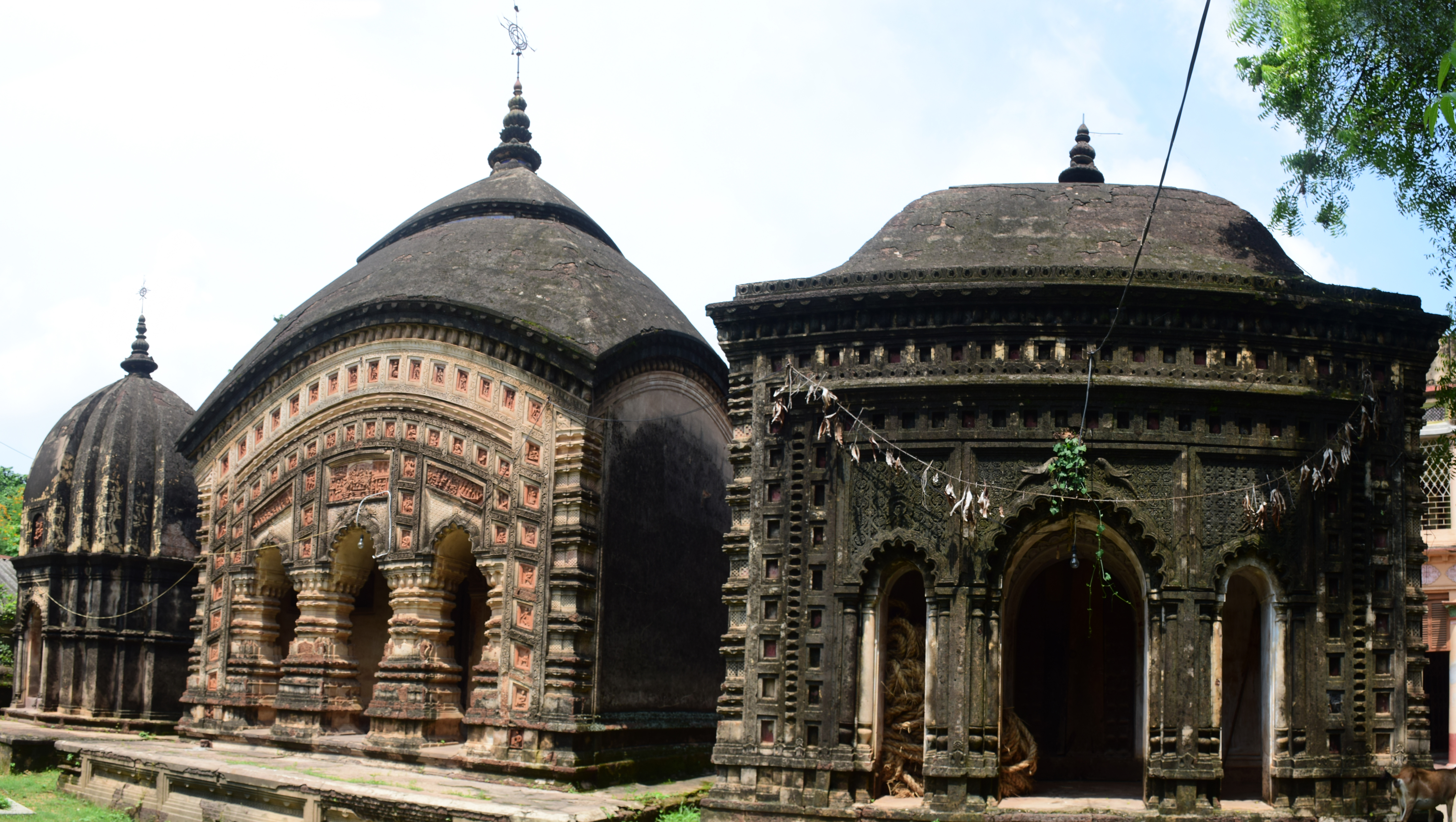
Patrasayer: Deul, at chala and dalan temples.

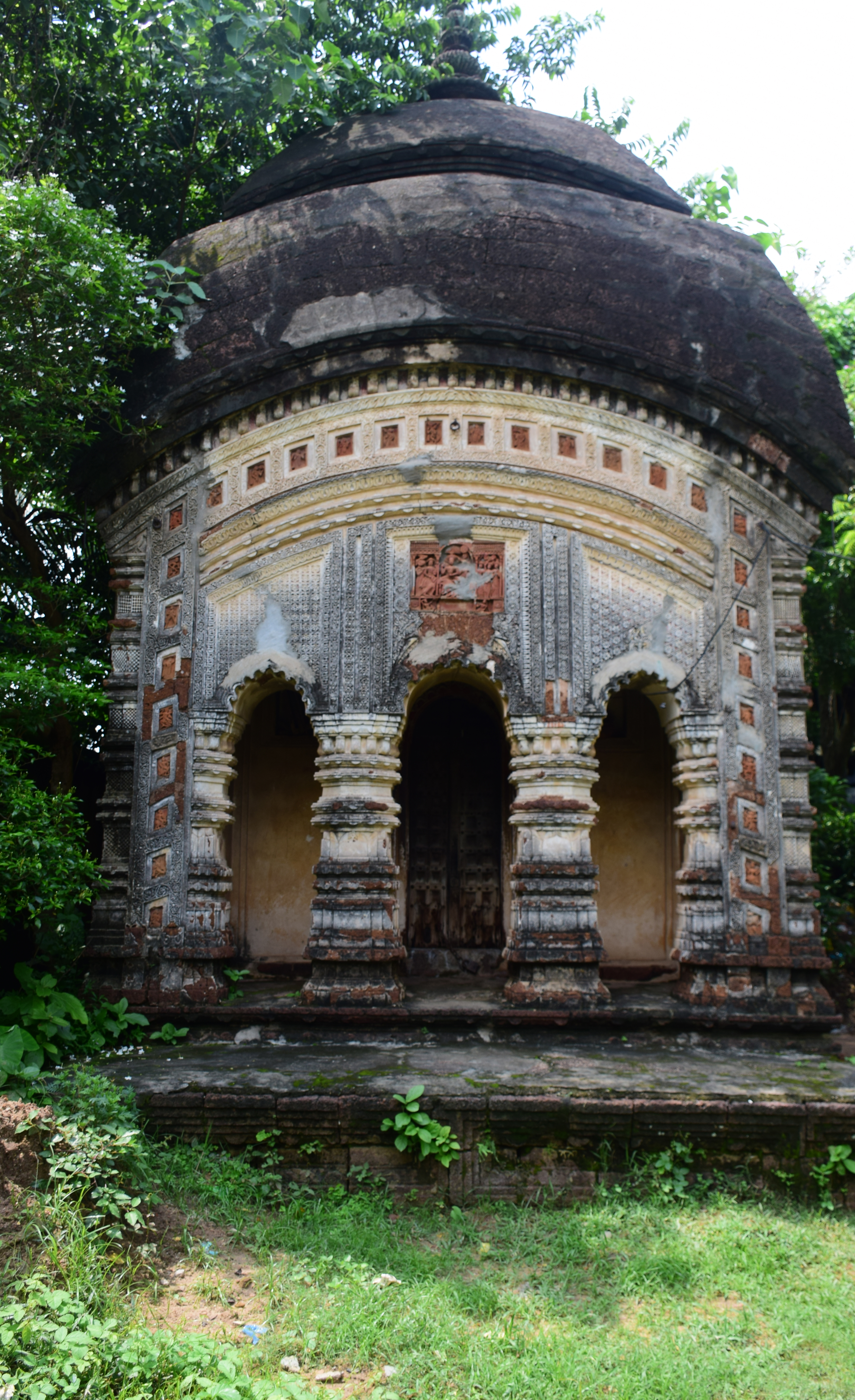
Patrasayer: At chala Sridhar temple

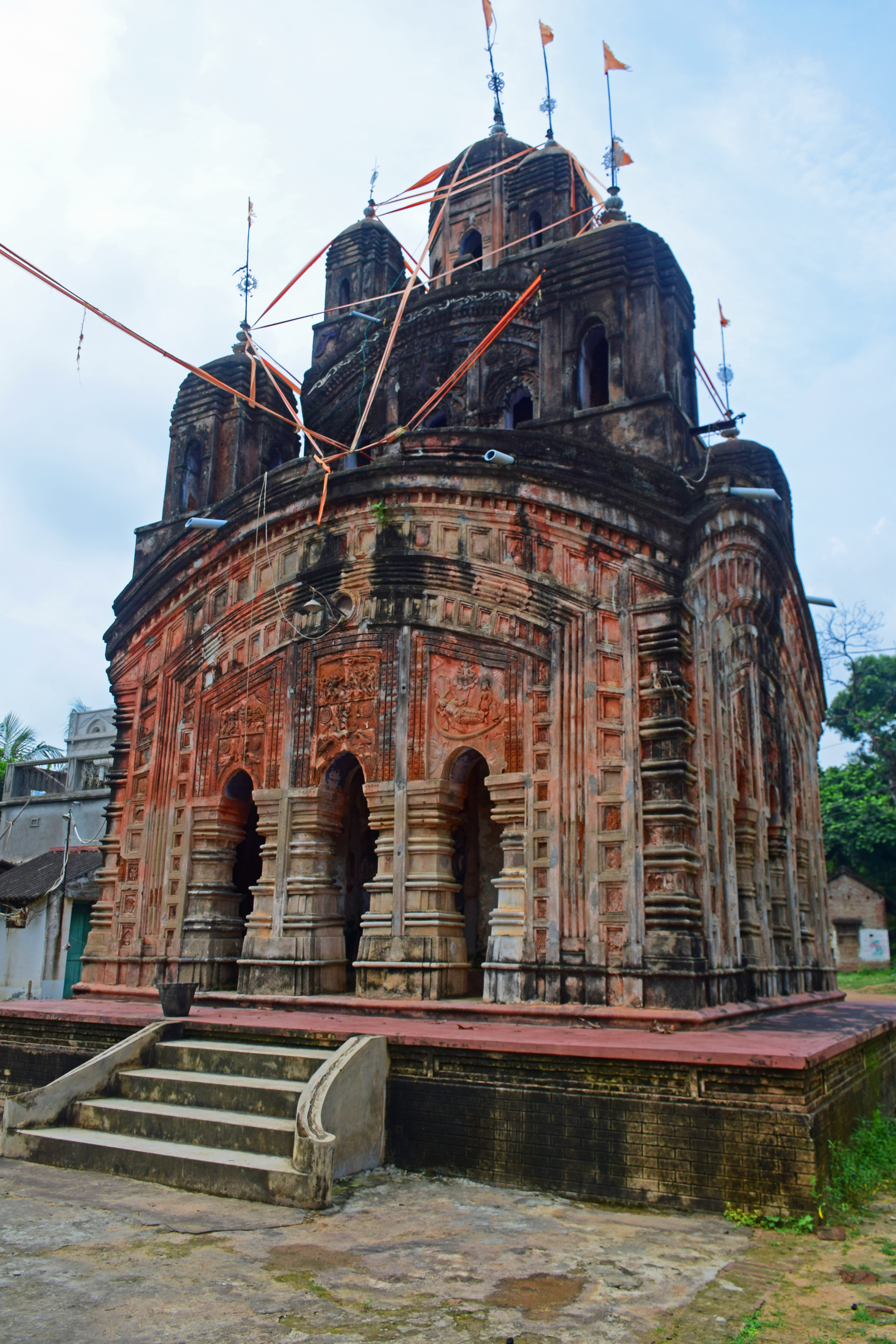
Bamira: Nava ratna Nilmadhab temple, built in 18th century with terracotta plaques.

== Healthcare ==
In 2014, Patrasayer CD block had 1 rural hospital and 3 primary health centres with total 50 beds and 4 doctors. It had 27 family welfare sub centres and 1 family welfare centre. 5,229 patients were treated indoor and 168,175 patients were treated outdoor in the hospitals, health centres and subcentres of the CD block.

Patrasayer Rural Hospital, with 30 beds at Hat Krishnanagar, is the major government medical facility in the Patrasayer CD block. There are primary health centres at Purba Naldanga (Roll) (with 6 beds), Pandua (Kushdwip) (with 4 beds) and Balsi (with 10 beds).
