= Patit Dommahal =

- Village
- Location in West Bengal, India Patit Dommahal (India)
- Coordinates: 23.1657°N 87.5717°E
- Country: India
- State: West Bengal
- District: Bankura

Population (2011)
  - Total: 2,061

Languages
  - Official: Bengali, English
- Time zone: UTC+5:30 (IST)
- PIN: 722206
- Telephone/STD code: 03244
- Lok Sabha constituency: Bishnupur
- Vidhan Sabha constituency: Indas
- Website: bankura.gov.in

Patit Dommahal is a village in the Patrasayer CD block in the Bishnupur subdivision of the Bankura district in the state of West Bengal, India.

== Geography ==
Places in Bishnupur subdivision in Bankura district
M: Municipal town, CT: census town, R: rural/ urban centre, T: ancient/ temple centre
Owing to space constraints in the small map, the actual locations in a larger map may vary slightly

=== Location ===
Patit Dommahal is located at 23.1657°N 87.5717°E.

Note: The map alongside presents some of the notable locations in the subdivision. All places marked in the map are linked in the larger full screen map.

== Demographics ==
According to the 2011 Census of India, Patit Dommahal had a total population of 3,971, of which 1,983 (50%) were males and 1,988 (50%) were females. There were 404 persons in the age range of 0–6 years. The total number of literate persons in Patit Dommahal was 2,372 (66.50% of the population over 6 years).

== Education ==
Patit High School is a Bengali-medium coeducational institution established in 1955. It has facilities for teaching from class V to class XII. The school has 10 computers, a library with 2,300 books and a playground.

Patrasayer Mahavidyalaya was established in 2005 at Patrasayer

== Culture ==
David J. McCutchion mentions the Sridhara temple of the Rakshit family as a low towered at-chala, having 12’2" square base, brick built with terracotta façade, constructed in the 19th century.

== Patit picture gallery ==
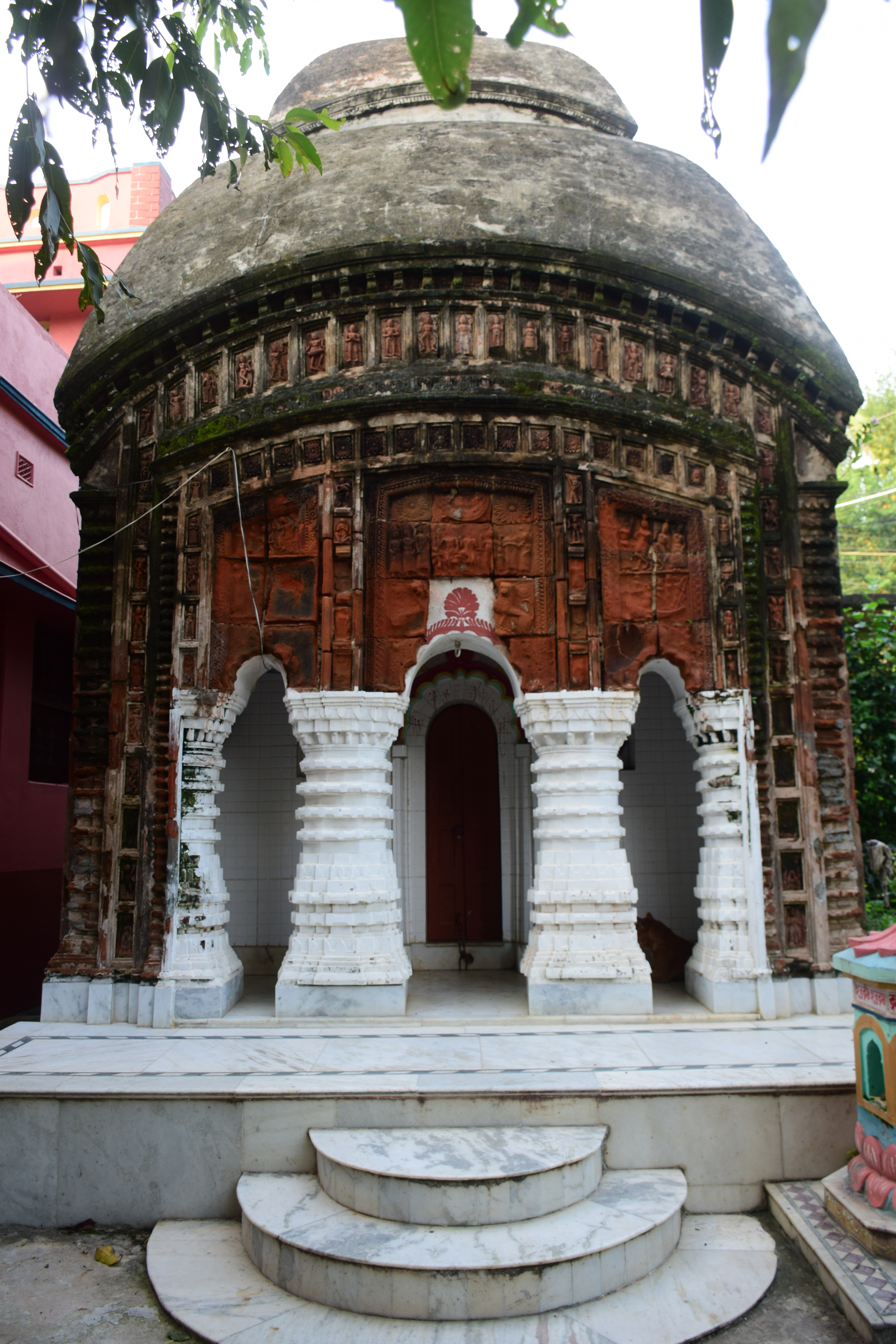
Sridhar temple

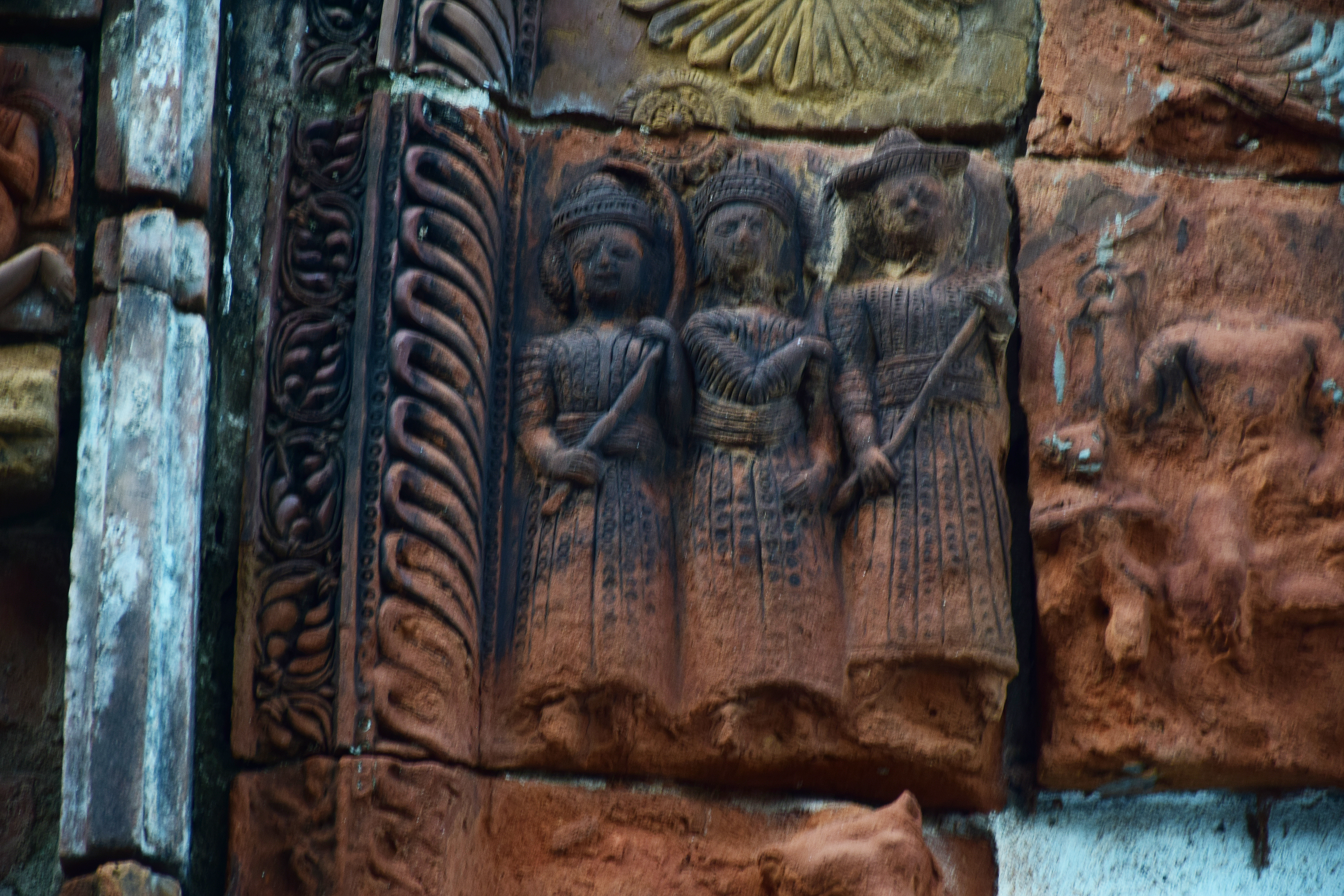
Terracotta panel

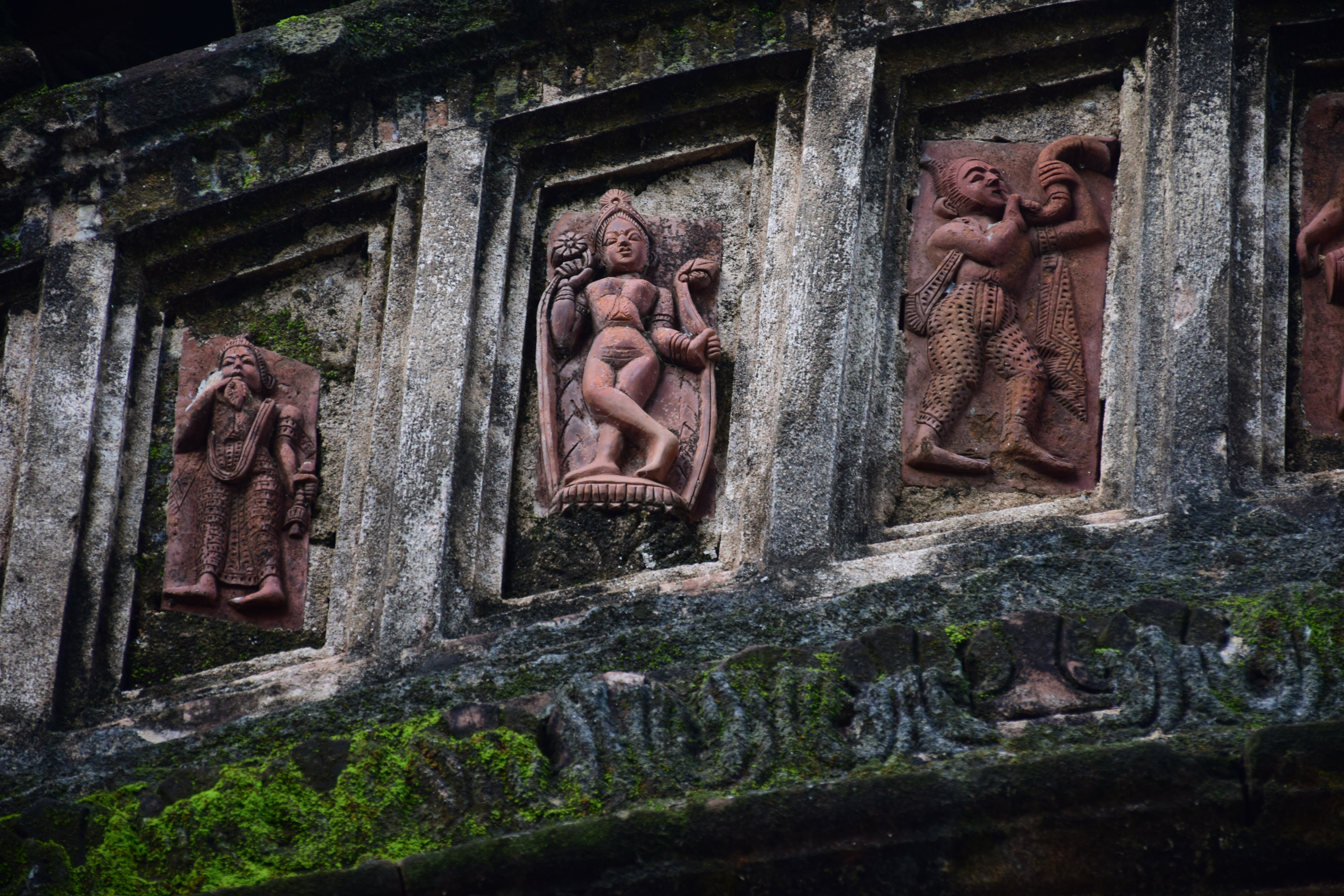
Terracotta panel

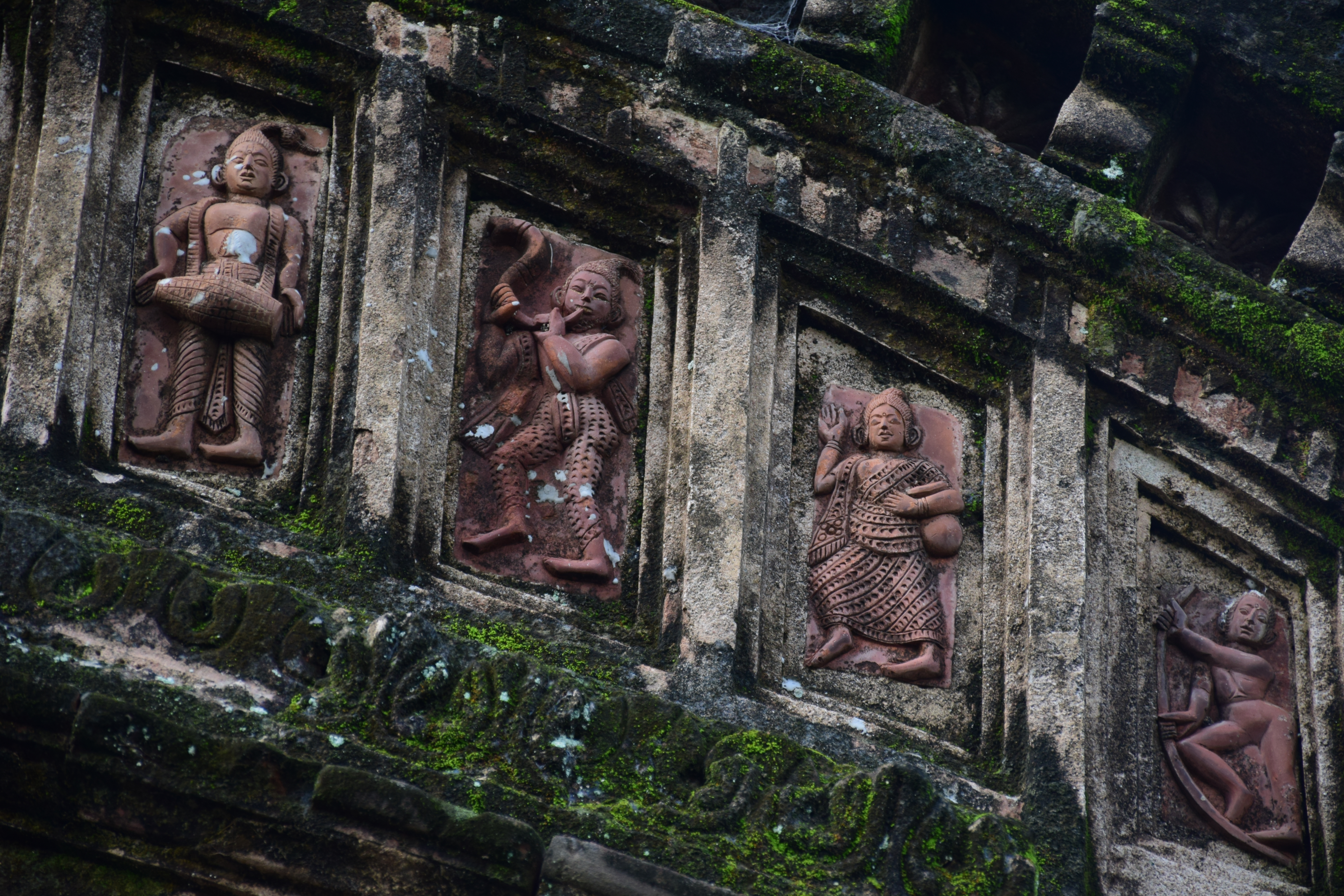
Terracotta panel

== Healthcare ==
Patrasayer Rural Hospital, with 30 beds at Hat Krishnanagar, is the major government medical facility in the Patrasayer CD block. There is a primary health centre at Balsi, with 10 beds.
