= Hadal Narayanpur =

- Village
- Location in West Bengal, India Hadal Narayanpur (India)
- Coordinates: 23.274694°N 87.523894°E
- Country: India 23.274694,87.523894
- State: West Bengal
- District: Bankura

Population (2011)
  - Total: 1,148+487

Languages
  - Official: Bengali, English
- Time zone: UTC+5:30 (IST)
- PIN: 722122
- Telephone/STD code: 03244
- Lok Sabha constituency: Bishnupur
- Vidhan Sabha constituency: Sonamukhi
- Website: bankura.gov.in

Hadal Narayanpur are two adjacent villages considered as one in the Patrasayer CD block in the Bishnupur subdivision of the Bankura district in the state of West Bengal, India.

== History ==
Hadal-Narayanpur got its prominence with the arrival of Sri Muchiram Ghosh, a Sadgop gentleman from Nilpur of erstwhile Gopbhum region in 1693 A.D.

During that period, Shubhankar Das the famous mathematician was employed as tarafdar of Parulia, he was very close to Muchiram Ghosh. Shubhankar Das introduced Muchiram Ghosh to Raja Gopal Singh of Bishnupur. Muchiram received the title of Mandal (Mandalpati) with zamindari of Hadalnarayanpur and its adjoining areas from Raja Gopal Singh.

== Geography ==
Places in Bishnupur subdivision in Bankura district
M: Municipal town, CT: census town, R: rural/ urban centre, T: ancient/ temple centre
Owing to space constraints in the small map, the actual locations in a larger map may vary slightly

=== Location ===
Hadal Narayanpur is located at 23.274694°N 87.523894°E.

Note: The map alongside presents some of the notable locations in the subdivision. All places marked in the map are linked in the larger full screen map.

== Demographics ==
According to the 2011 Census of India, Narayanpur had a total population of 1,148, of which 590 (51%) were males and 558 (49%) were females. There were 101 persons in the age range of 0–6 years. The total number of literate persons in Narayanpur was 850 (61.18% of the population over 6 years).

According to the 2011 Census of India, Hadal had a total population of 487, of which 255 (52%) were males and 232 (48%) were females. There were 55 persons in the age range of 0–6 years. The total number of literate persons in Balsi Purbapara was 278 (64.35% of the population over 6 years).

== Education ==
Hadal Narayanpur High School is a Bengali-medium coeducational institution established in 1906. It has facilities for teaching from class V to class XII. The school has 10 computers, a library with 1,800 books and a playground.

Patrasayer Mahavidyalaya was established in 2005 at Patrasayer

== Culture ==
David J. McCutchion mentions the Radha Damodara temple of the ‘Barabari’ as a nava-ratna structure with ridged turrets and rich terracotta façade, built in the 19th century. The Rasamancha has rich terracotta on eight sides and the Radha Damodara temple of ‘choto taraf’ as of a modified ratna design, with rich terracotta façade, built in the 19th century.

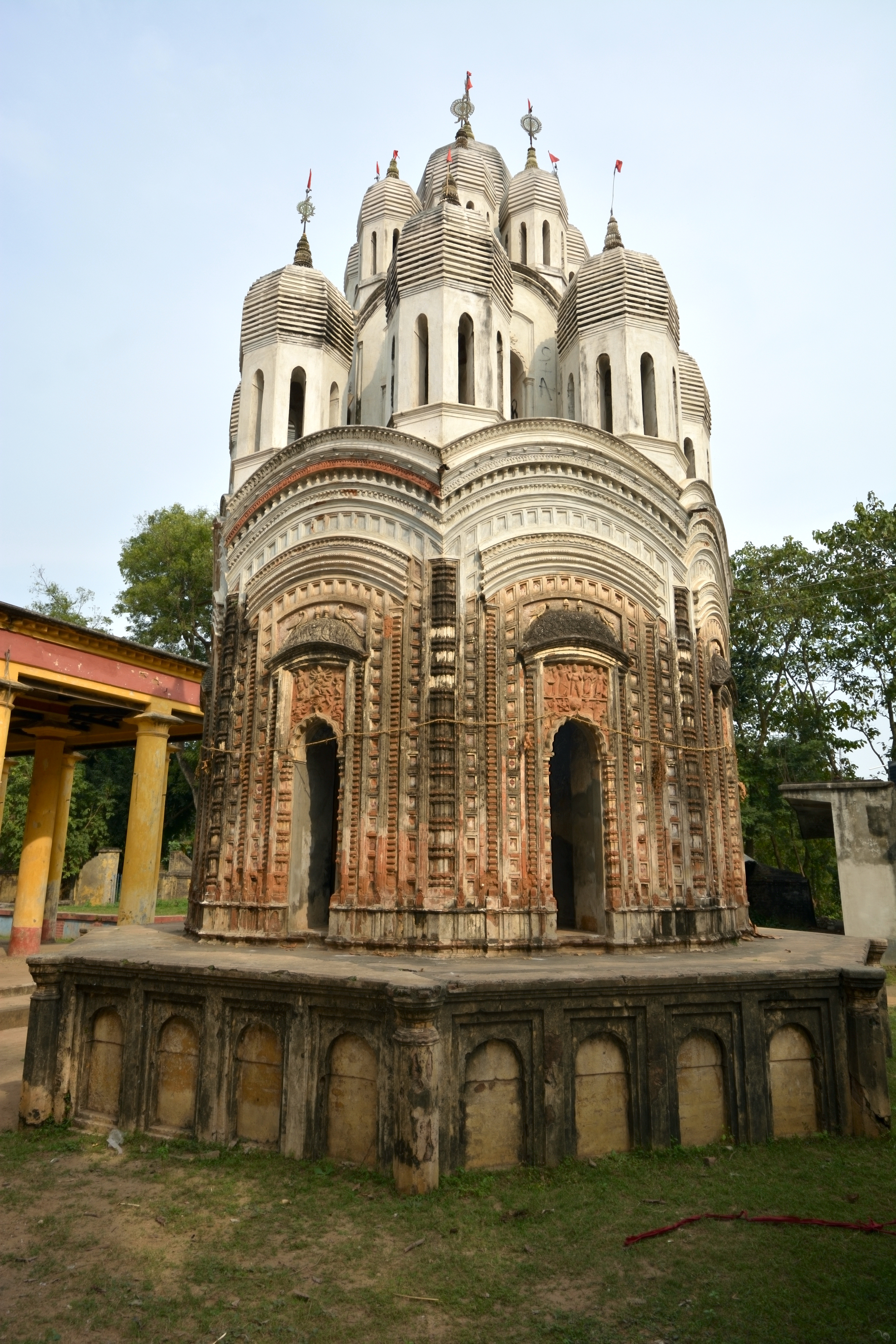
Rasmancha of 'bara taraf'

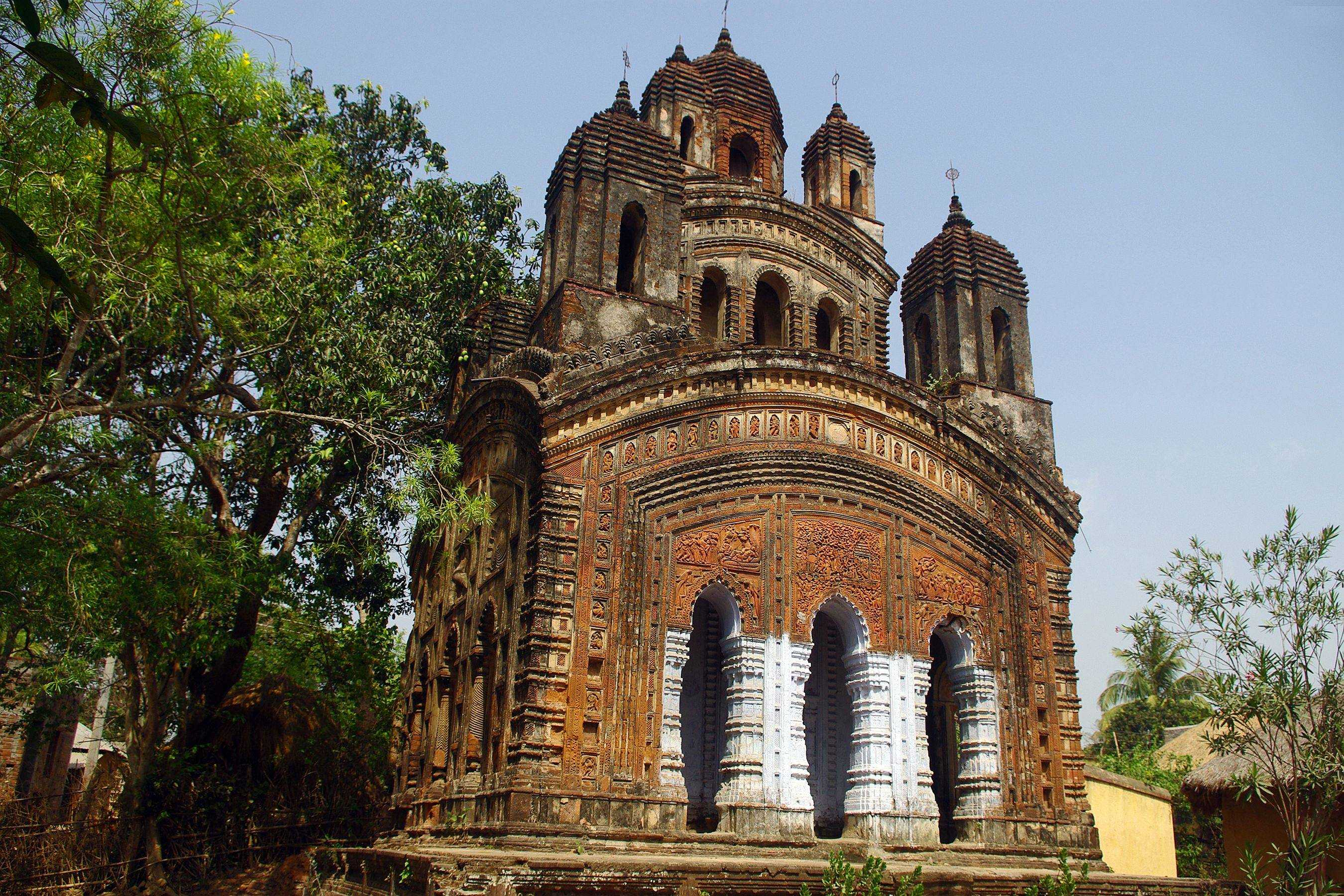
Nava-ratna temple of Mandal family (‘meja taraf’)

== Healthcare ==
Patrasayer Rural Hospital, with 30 beds at Hat Krishnanagar, is the major government medical facility in the Patrasayer CD block.
