= Balsi Purbapara =

- Village
- Location in West Bengal, India Balsi Purbapara (India)
- Coordinates: 23.1597°N 87.5517°E
- Country: India
- State: West Bengal
- District: Bankura

Population (2011)
  - Total: 1,516

Languages
  - Official: Bengali, English
- Time zone: UTC+5:30 (IST)
- PIN: 722206
- Telephone/STD code: 03244
- Lok Sabha constituency: Bishnupur
- Vidhan Sabha constituency: Indas
- Website: bankura.gov.in

Balsi Purbapara is a village in the Patrasayer CD block in the Bishnupur subdivision of the Bankura district in the state of West Bengal, India.

== Geography ==
Places in Bishnupur subdivision in Bankura district
M: Municipal town, CT: census town, R: rural/ urban centre, T: ancient/ temple centre
Owing to space constraints in the small map, the actual locations in a larger map may vary slightly

=== Location ===
Balsi Purbapara is located at 23.1597°N 87.5517°E.

Note: The map alongside presents some of the notable locations in the subdivision. All places marked in the map are linked in the larger full screen map.

== Demographics ==
According to the 2011 Census of India, Balsi Purbapara had a total population of 1,516, of which 1767 (51%) were males and 749 (49%) were females. There were 155 persons in the age range of 0–6 years. The total number of literate persons in Balsi Purbapara was 1,002 (73.62% of the population over 6 years).

== Education ==
Balsi High School is a Bengali-medium coeducational institution established in 1945. It has facilities for teaching from class V to class XII. The school has 5 computers, a library with 2,000 books and a playground.

Patrasayer Mahavidyalaya was established in 2005 at Patrasayer

== Culture ==
David J. McCutchion mentions the Vishnu temple as a good example of 19th century terracotta decorated standard ‘Birbhum-Bardhaman’ type Bengal deul. He also mentions a Lakshmi Narayana temple with a low towered at-chala built of laterite with stucco work in 1652, another low towered at-chala, a pancharatna dolamancha and an ek-ratna rasmancha.

== Balsi Purbapara picture gallery ==
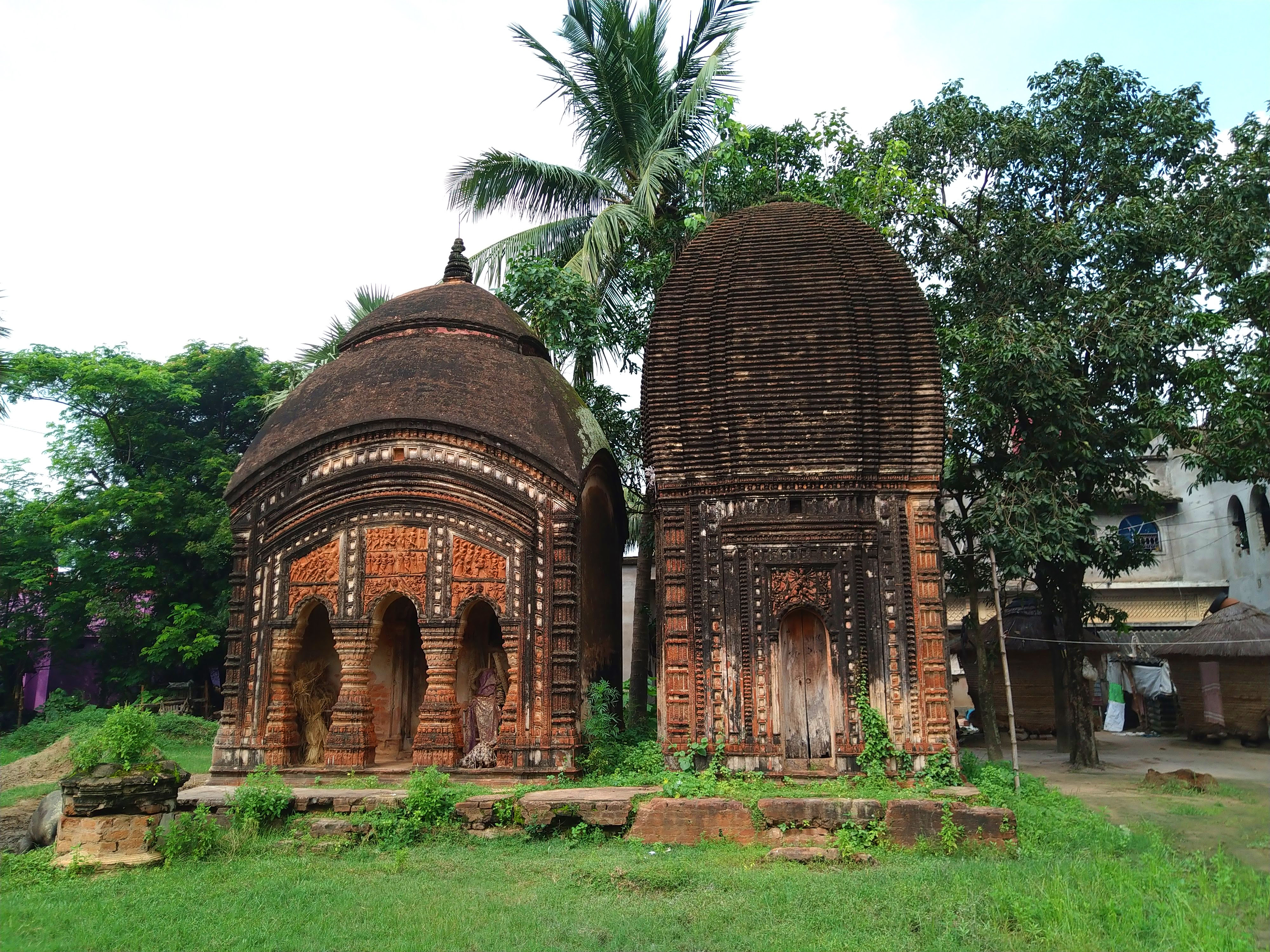
At-chala Shiva temple and Vishnu deul

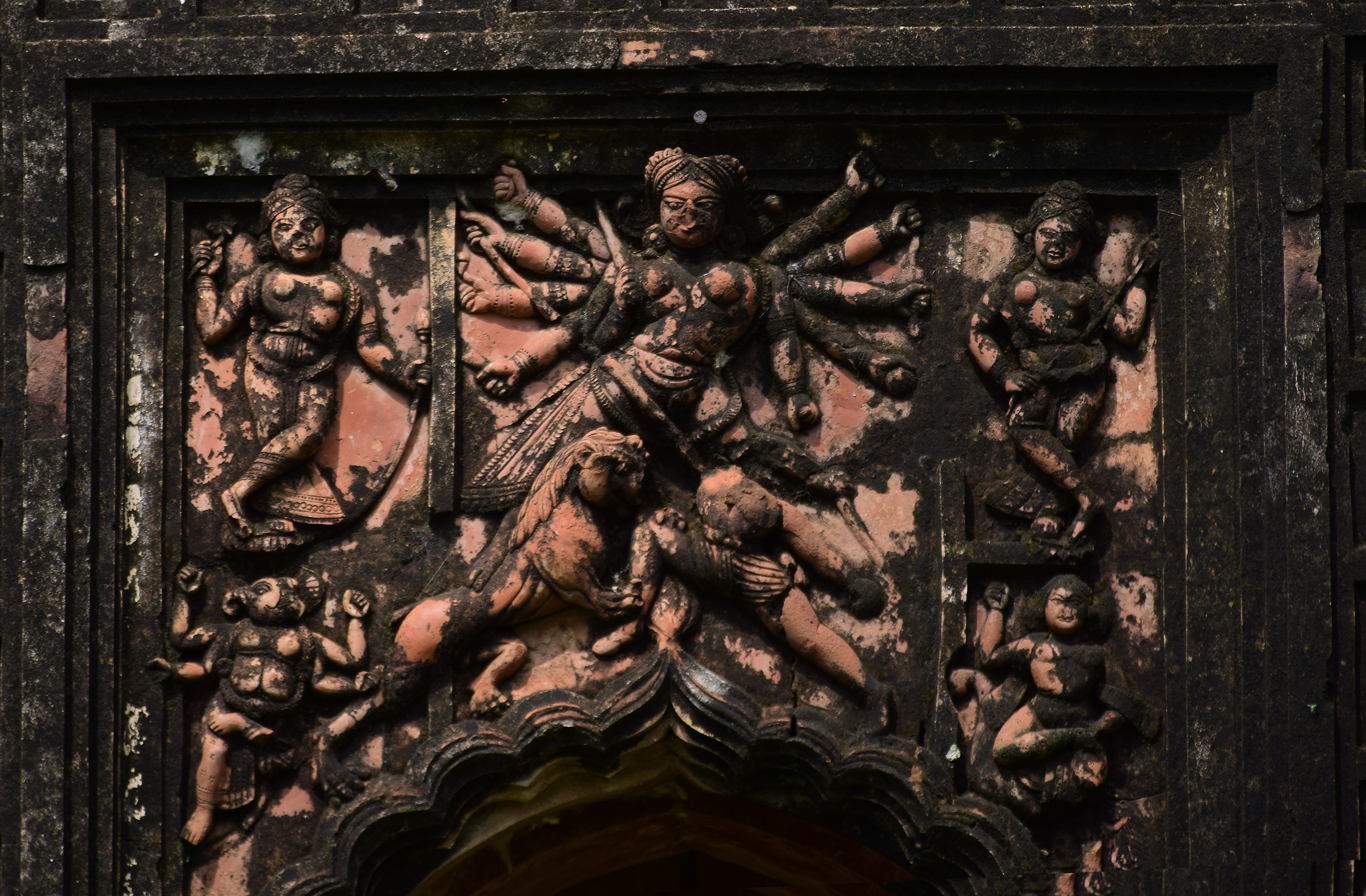
Terracotta panel in the Vishnu deul

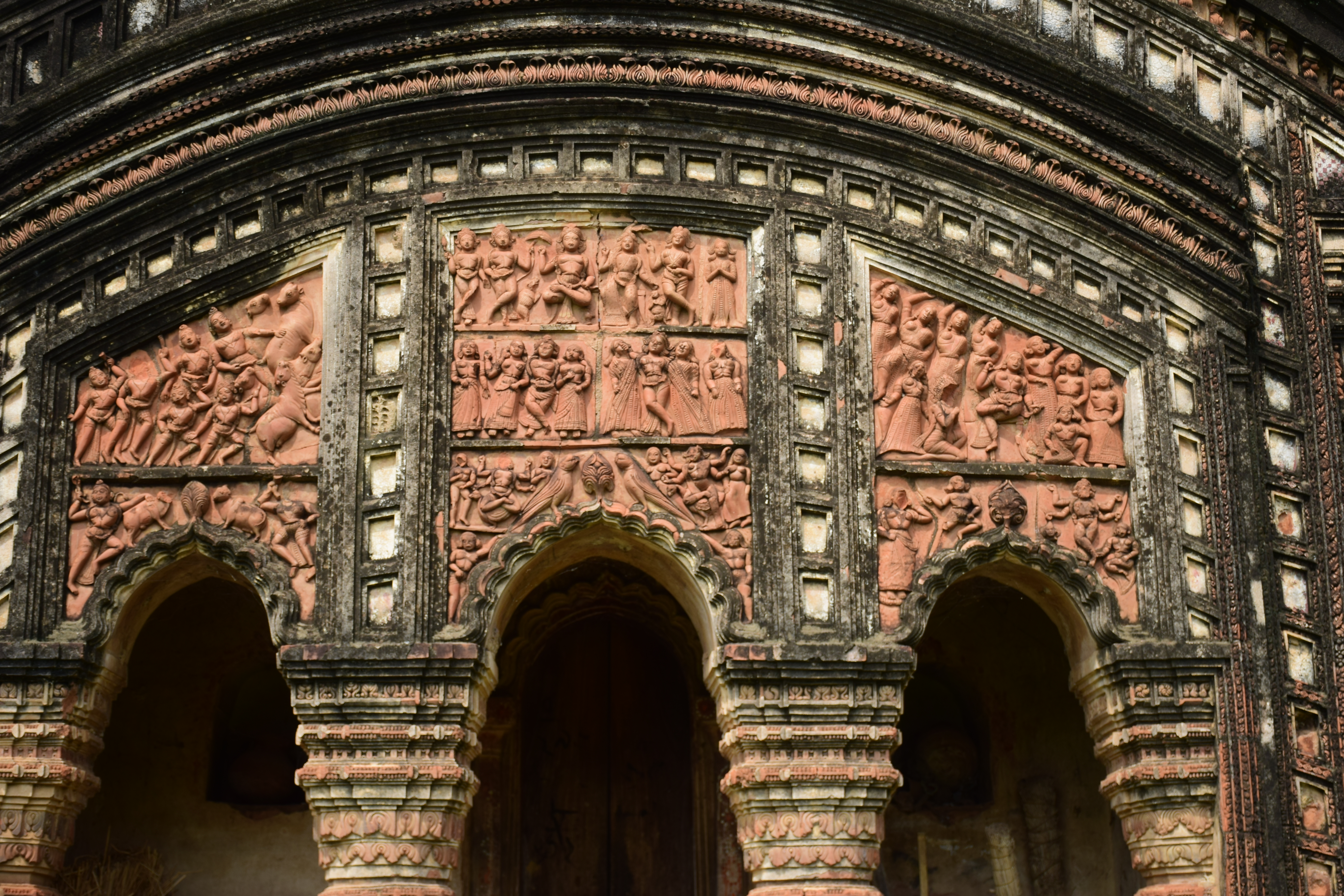
Terracotta panel in the Shiva temple

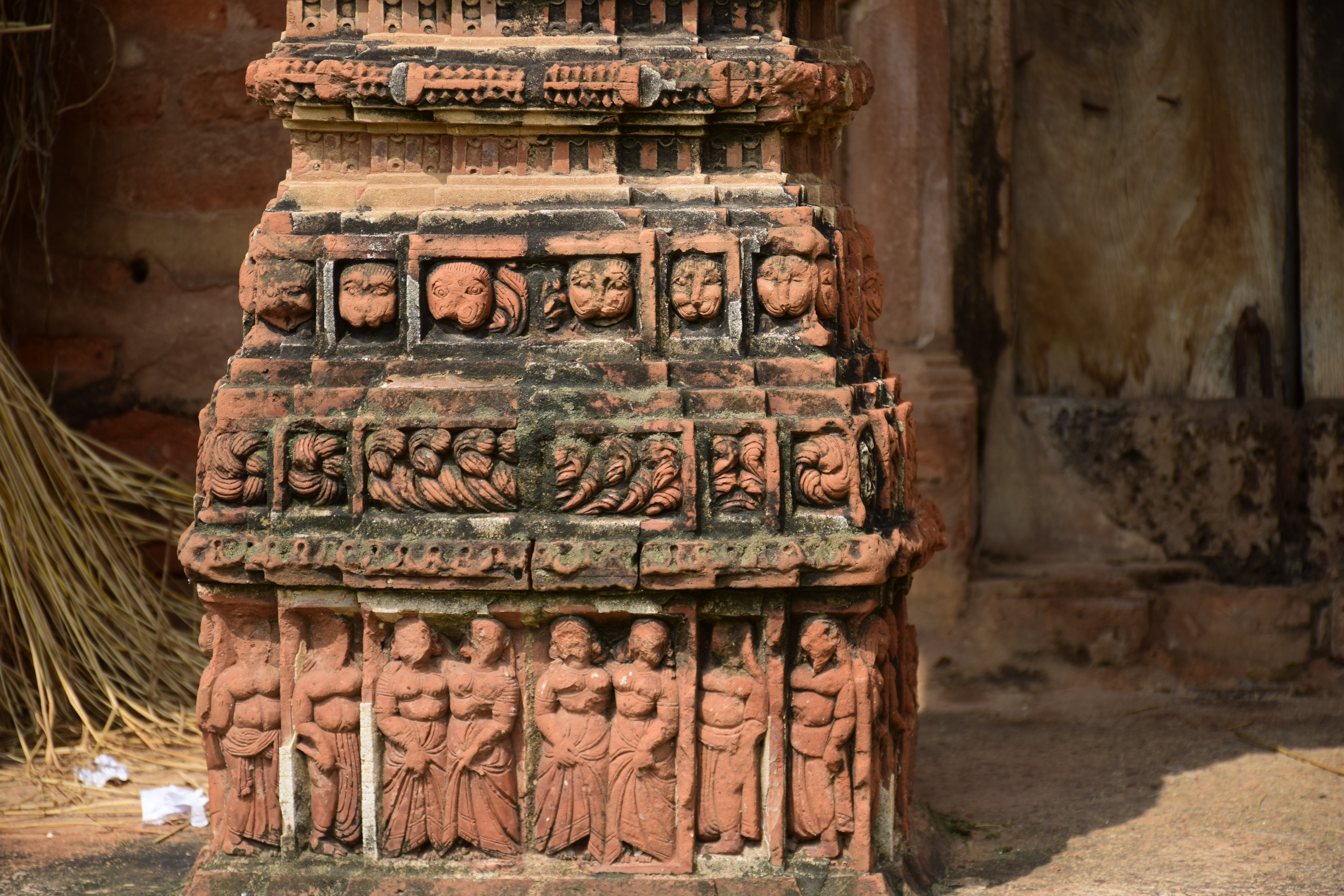
Terracotta work in the Shiva temple

== Healthcare ==
There is a primary health centre at Balsi, with 10 beds.
