= Patrasayer =

- Village
- Location in West Bengal, India Patrasayer (India)
- Coordinates: 23°12′16.9″N 87°31′50.5″E
- Country: India
- State: West Bengal
- District: Bankura

Population (2011)
  - Total: 10,844

Languages
  - Official: Bengali, English
- Time zone: UTC+5:30 (IST)
- PIN: 722206 (Patrasayer)
- Telephone/STD code: 03244
- Lok Sabha constituency: Bishnupur
- Vidhan Sabha constituency: Sonamukhi
- Website: bankura.gov.in

Patrasayer (also spelled Patrasayar, Patrasair) is a village in the Patrasayer CD block in the Bishnupur subdivision of the Bankura district in the state of West Bengal, India.

== Geography ==
Places in Bishnupur subdivision in Bankura district
M: Municipal town, CT: census town, R: rural/ urban centre, T: ancient/ temple centre
Owing to space constraints in the small map, the actual locations in a larger map may vary slightly

=== Location ===
Patrasayer is located at 23°12′16.9″N 87°31′50.5″E.

=== Area overview ===
The map alongside shows the Bishnupur subdivision of Bankura district. Physiographically, this area has fertile low lying alluvial plains. It is a predominantly rural area with 90.06% of the population living in rural areas and only 8.94% living in the urban areas. It was a part of the core area of Mallabhum.

Note: The map alongside presents some of the notable locations in the subdivision. All places marked in the map are linked in the larger full screen map.

== Demographics ==
According to the 2011 Census of India, Patrasayer had a total population of 10,844 of which 5,528 (51%) were males and 5,316 (49%) were females. Population below 6 years was 1,115. The total number of literates in Patrasayer was 7,274 (74.77% of the population over 6 years).

== Civic administration ==
=== Police station ===
Patrasyer police station has jurisdiction over Patrasyer CD block. The area covered is 321.07 km^{2} with a population of 164,048.

=== CD block HQ ===
The headquarters of Patrasayer CD block are located at Patrasayer.

== Transport ==
Patrasayer railway station, 56.5 km from Bankura, is a station on the Bankura-Masagram line (formerly Bankura Damodar Railway) of South Eastern Railway. As of September 2016, DEMU services were available between Bankura and Mathnasibpur.

The State Highway 8 (West Bengal) running from Santaldih (in Purulia district) to Majhdia (in Nadia district) passes through Patrasayer.

There are bus services from Bankura to Patrasayer via Beliatore and Sonamukhi, Bishnupur to Patrasayer, and Volvo services to Nutungra, and Bankibheri (in Paschim Medinipur) - 196 km.

== Education ==
Patrasayer Mahavidyalaya, established in 2005, is affiliated to the University of Burdwan. It offers courses in arts.

Patrasayer Bamira Gurudas Institution is a Bengali-medium coeducational institution established in 1915. It has facilities for teaching from class V to class XII. The school has 10 computers, a library with 3,000 books and a playground.

Krishnanagar High School is a Bengali-medium coeducational institution established in 1957. It has facilities for teaching from class V to class XII. The school has 10 computers, a library with 1,300 books and a playground.

Patrasayer Girls High School is a Bengali-medium girls only institution established in 1956. It has facilities for teaching from class V to class X. The school has 14 computers, a library with 2,500 books and a playground.

Patrasayer Government Model School is an English-medium coeducational institution established at Kushdwip in 2014. It has facilities for teaching from class VI to class XII.

== Culture ==
David J. McCutchion speaks about several temples in and around Patrasayer:

- The Kalajiriya Shiva temple at Patrasayer is a plain brick temple built around 16th century.
- The Raghuvira temple at Patrasayer is a laterite at-chala with terracotta inlay built in the 19th century.
- The Shiva temple at Bamira is a nava-ratna with ridged turrets and rich terracotta on two sides, built in the 19th century.
- The Radha-Damodara temple at Birsingha is a nava-ratna with ridged turrets and rich terracotta façade, built in 1855. The nahabatkhna still stands with a curved roof.

== Patrasayer picture gallery ==
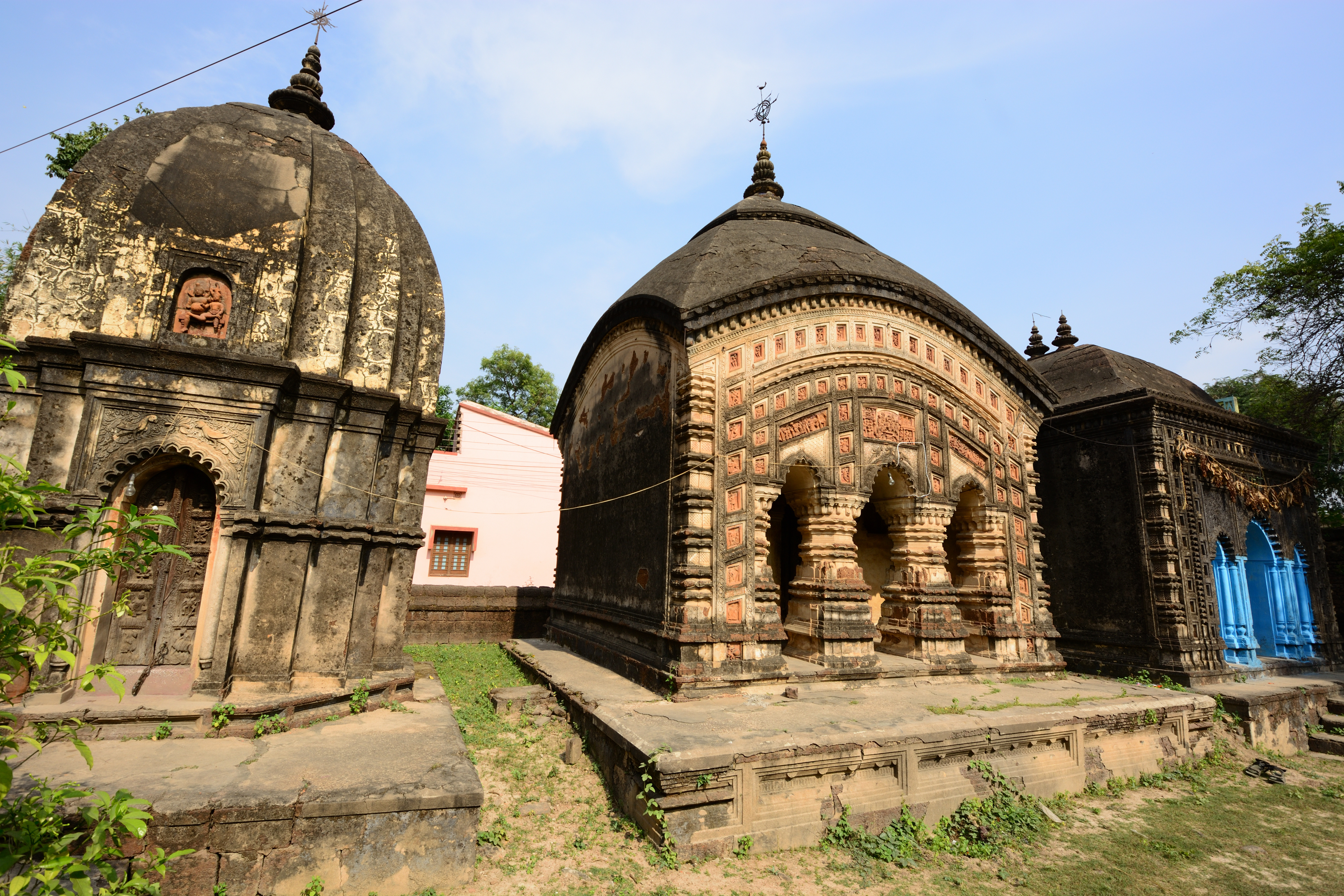
The three temples of Ghosalpara at Patrasayer in Bankura district of West Bengal. The temple on the left is a pancharatna deal Shiva Temple; the middle one is a charchala Raghuvir Temple while the temple on the extreme right is a dalan temple dedicated to Goddess Kali. All the temples are built of laterite.

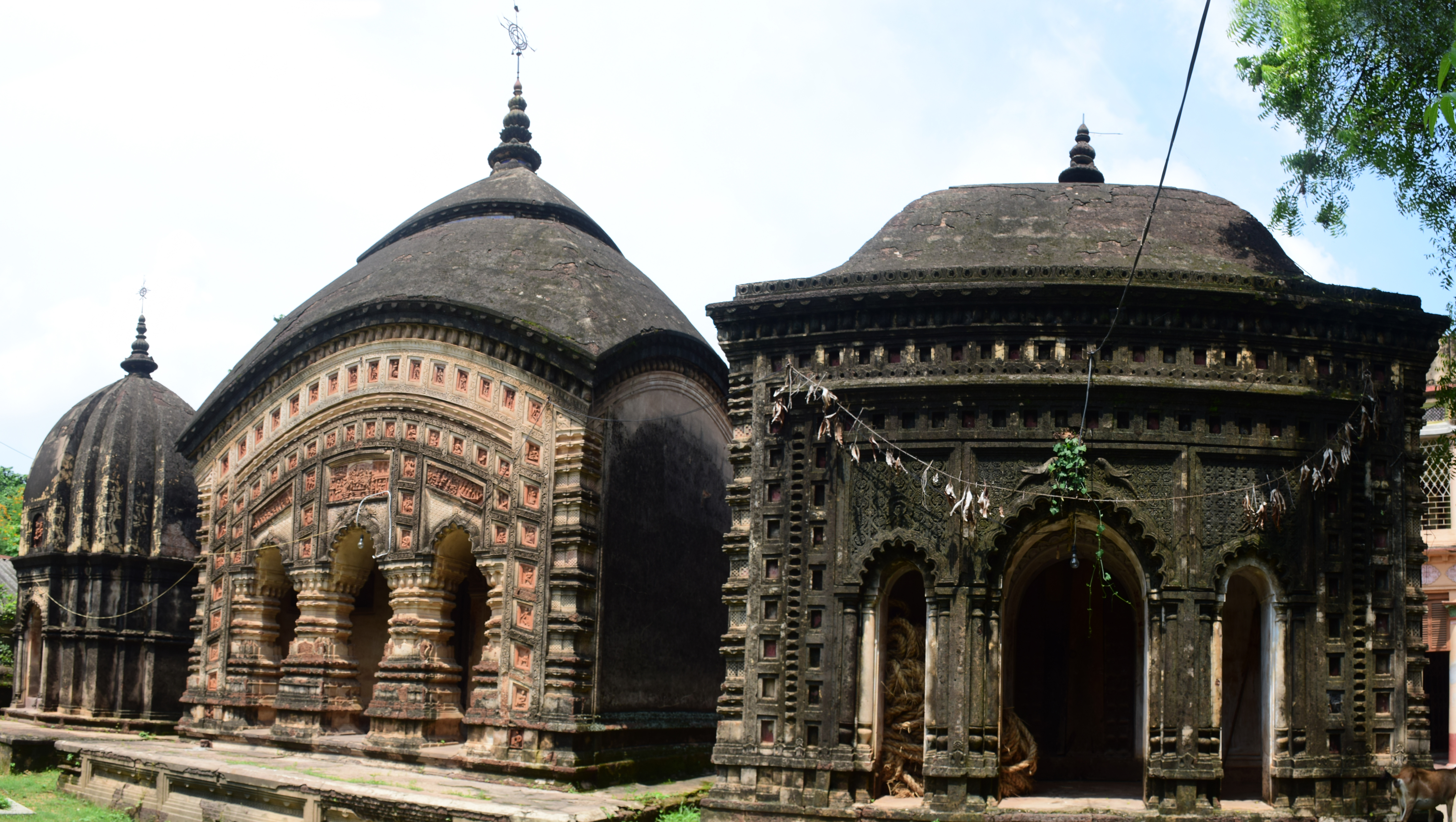
Deul, atchala and dalan temples

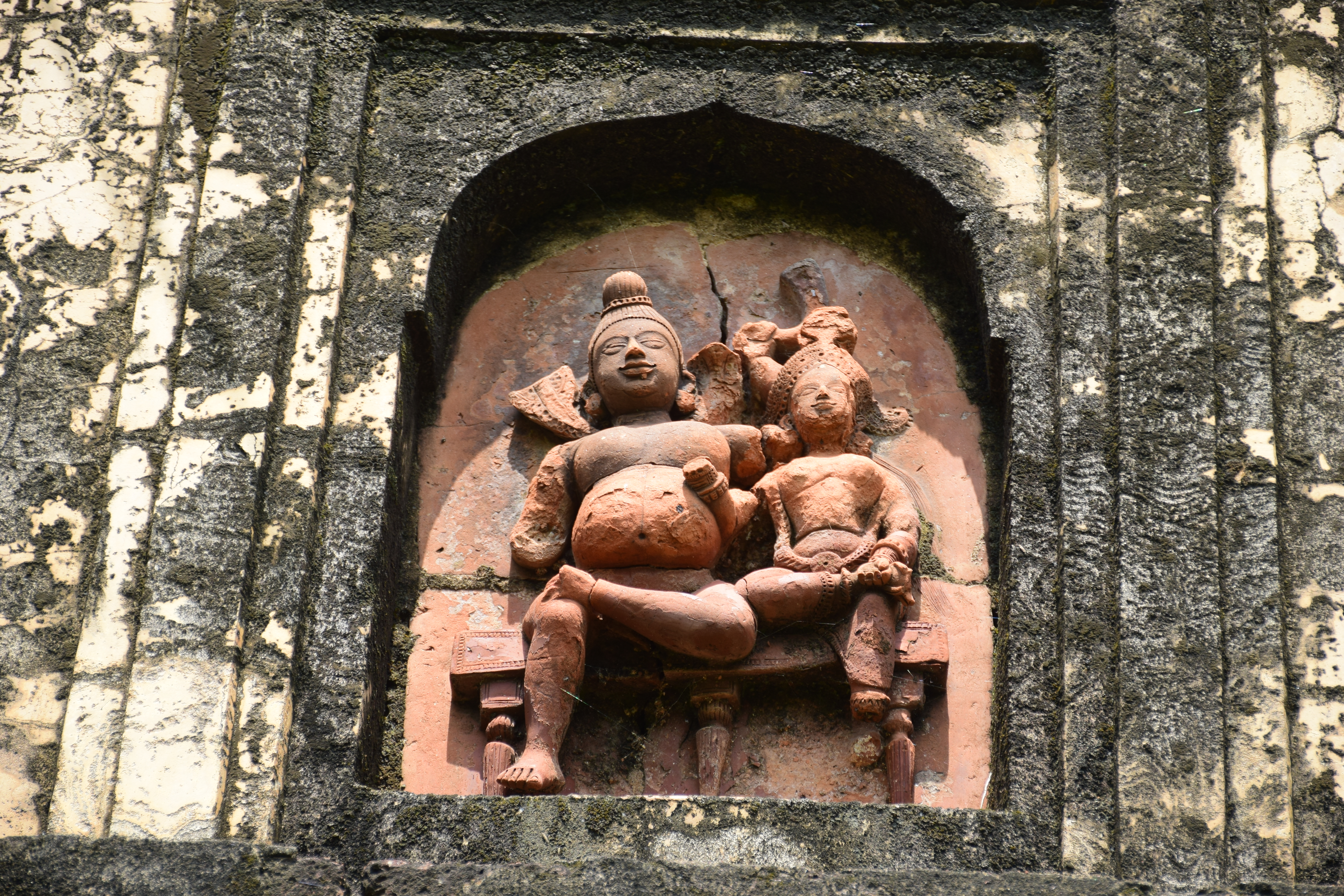
Terracotta plaque in the Shiva deul

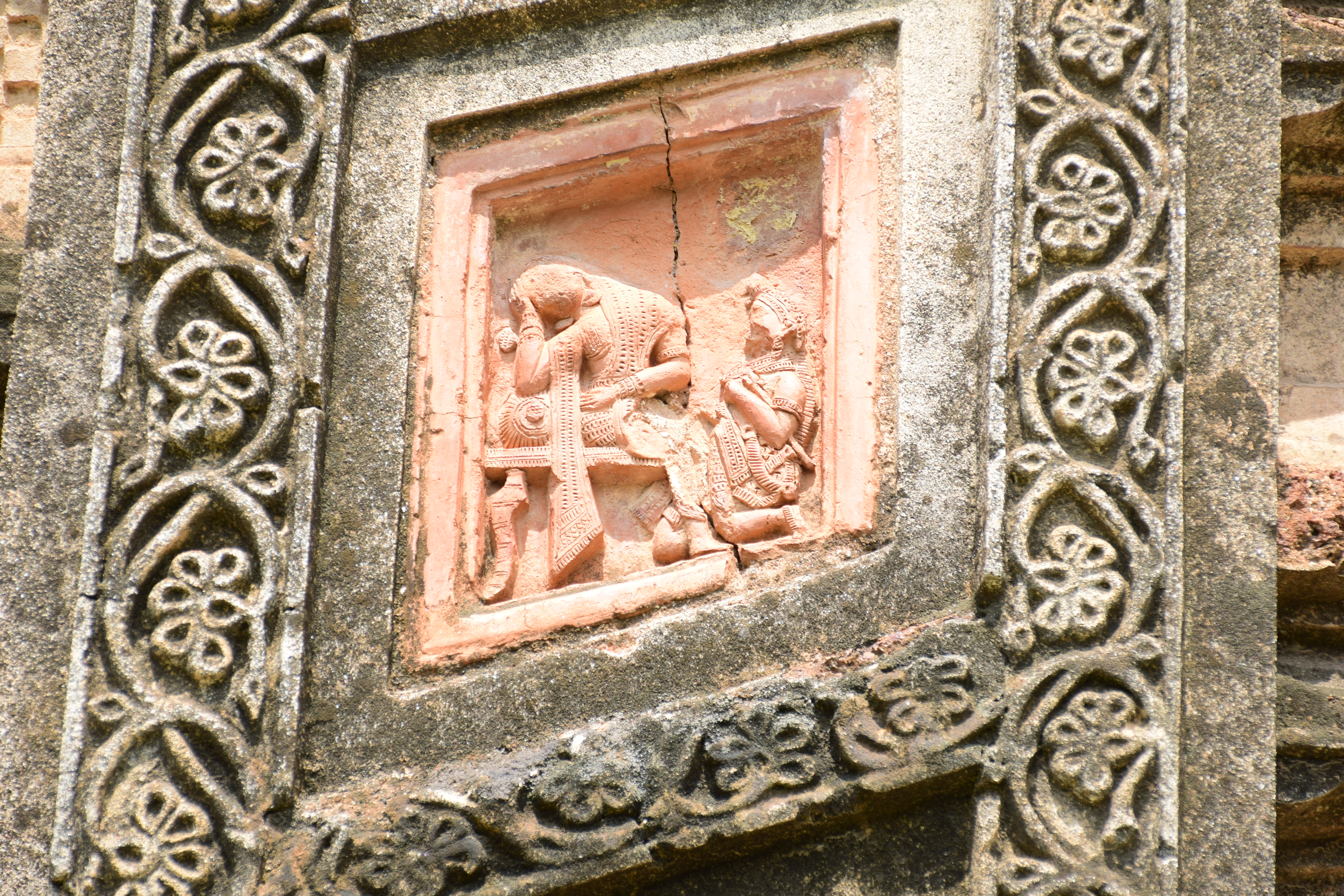
Terracotta plaque in the Ram Raghubir at-chala temple

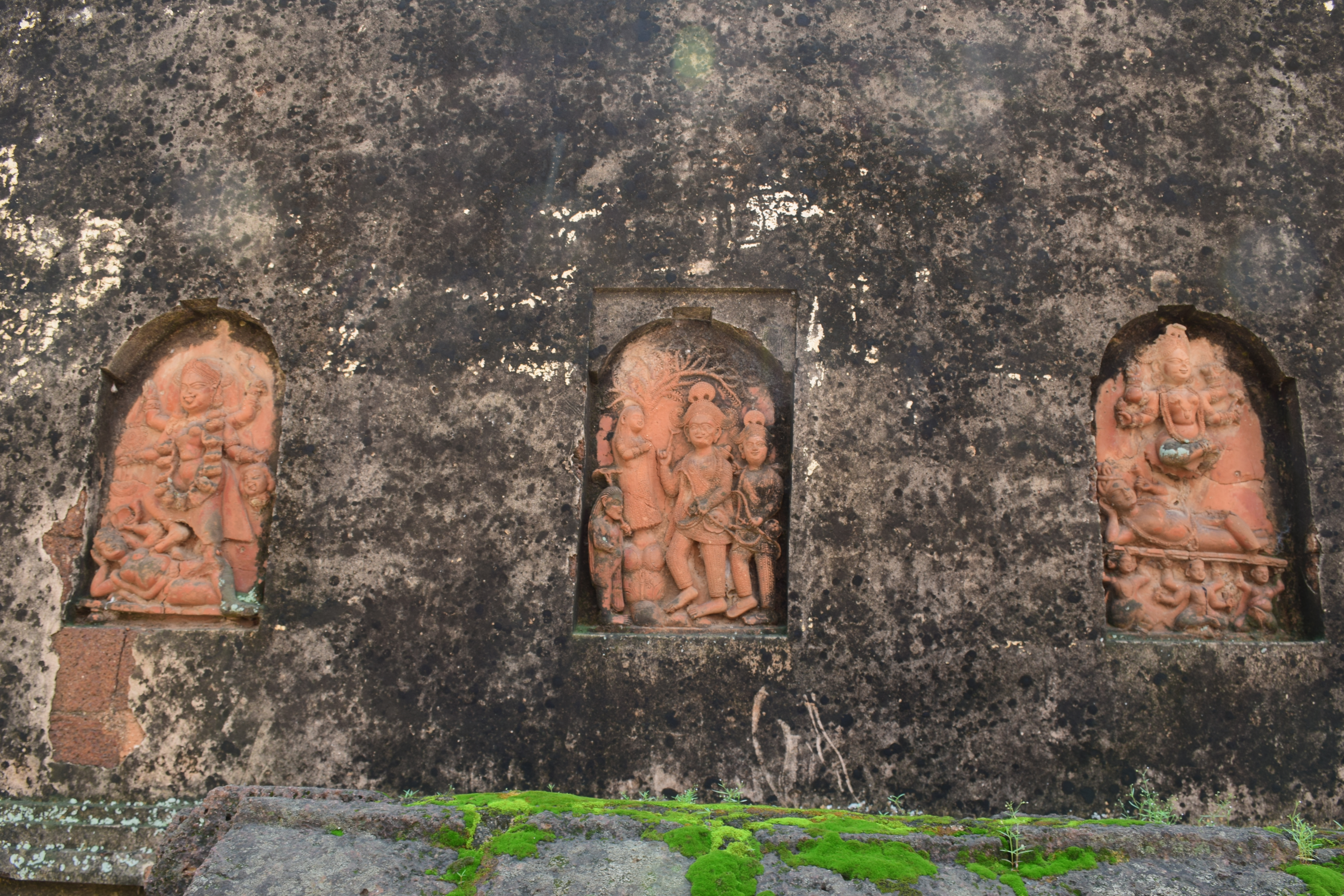
Large terracotta figures in the Kali mandir/ dalan temple

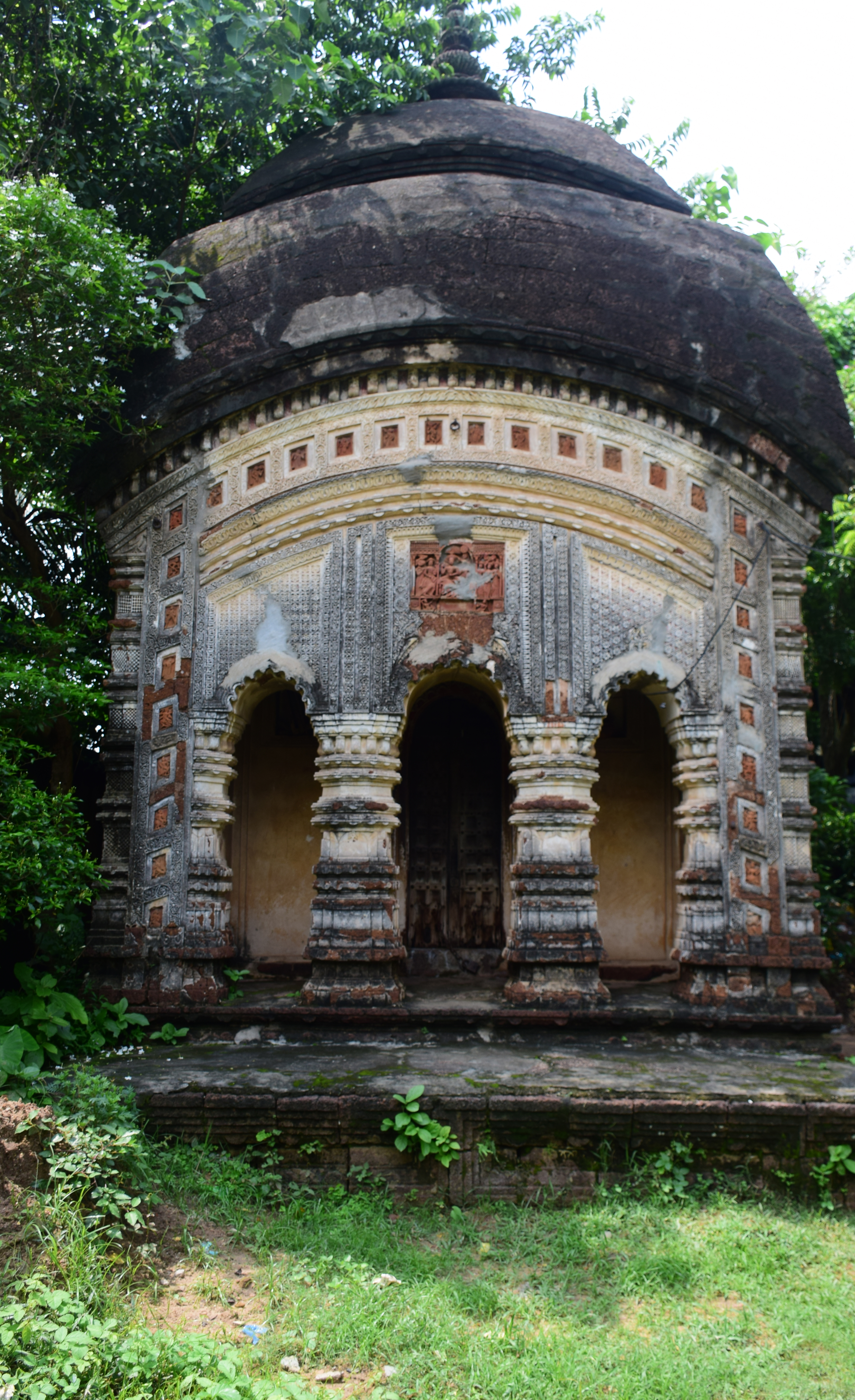
Sridhar at-chala temple

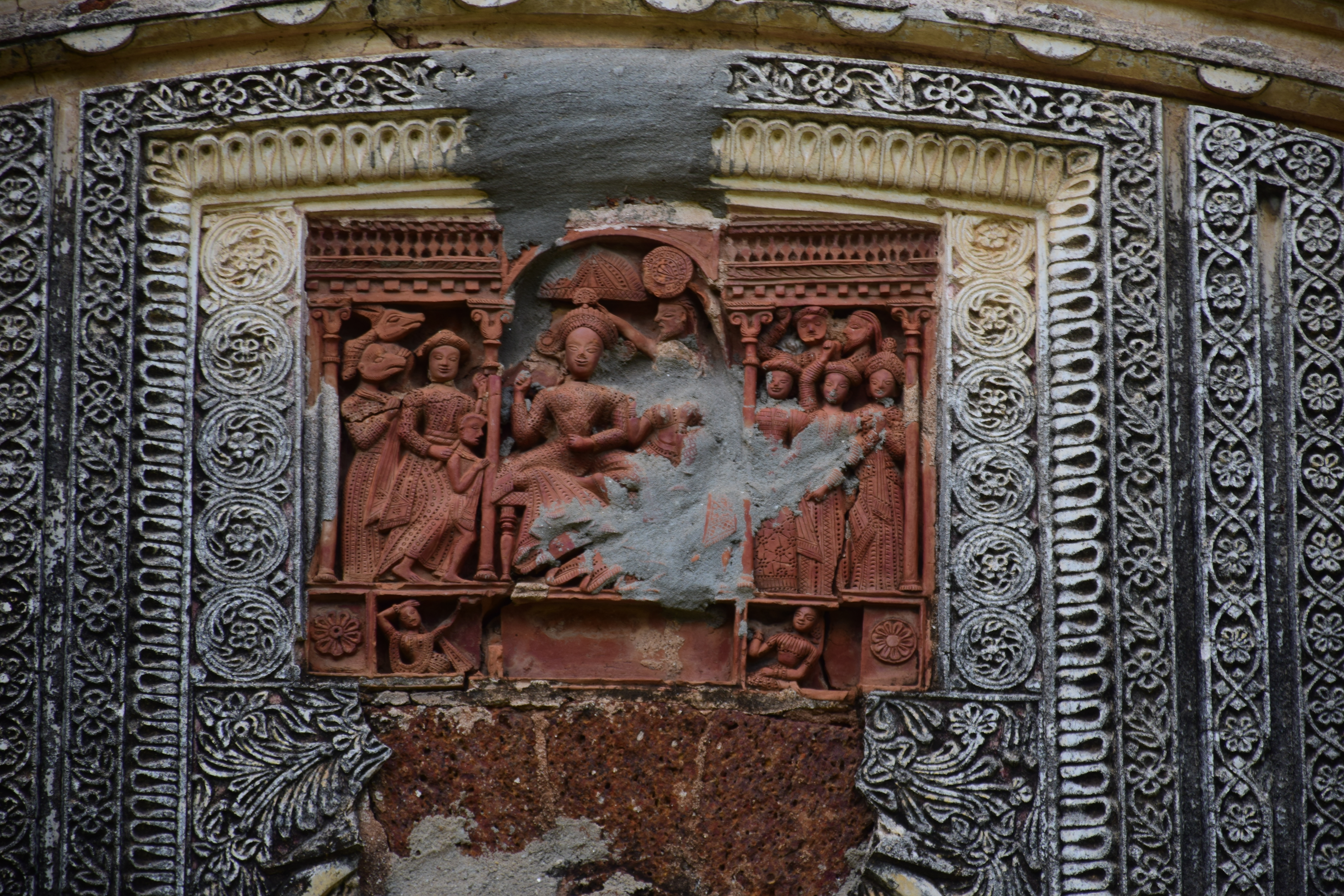
Terracotta panel at Sridhar at-chala temple

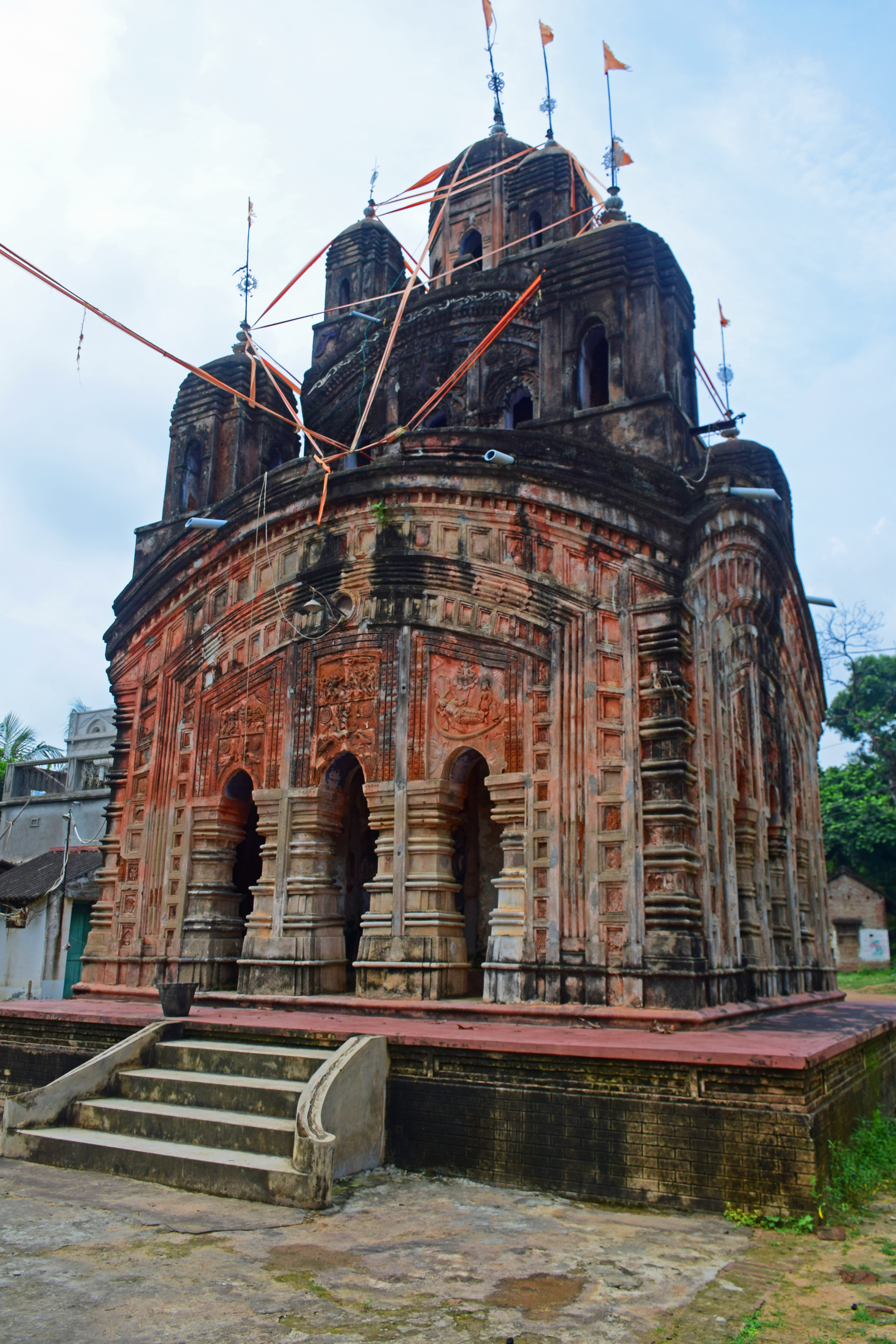
Shiva temple at Bamira

== Healthcare ==
Patrasayer Rural Hospital, with 30 beds at Hat Krishnanagar, is the major government medical facility in the Patrasayer CD block. There are primary health centres at Purba Naldanga (Roll) (with 6 beds), Pandua (Kushdwip) (with 4 beds) and Balsi (with 10 beds).
