= History of Bankura district =

History of Bankura, West Bengal, India

History of Bankura district refers to the history of the present Bankura district in the Indian state of West Bengal. Historically, the region was under the realm of Rarh in ancient Bengal.

== Prehistoric times ==
The earliest signs of human habitation in the area was at Dihar, discovered by Maniklal Sinha in the early 1970s. By about 1200-1000 BC chalcolithic people had settled on the north bank of the Dwarakeswar.

In later pre-historic times this area was inhabited by various Proto-Australoid and a few Proto-Dravidian tribes. The tribes were spread across different strata of development – food-gathering, hunting, animal-raring, and agriculture. Bankura district was part of Rarh in ancient times. This area was dominated by aboriginal tribes, more than other areas of Bengal, and was Aryanised or assimilated with the people and culture of the Proto-Indo-European group, who prevailed in northern India, substantially later than rest of Bengal. There were two primary groups of people, the Nishadas (who were Proto-Australoid tribes) and Dasa-dasyus (related to Dravidians). Santals and Mal Pahariyas were probably also there from the beginning. There were substantial differences amongst the tribes in relation to food, dress, religion, behavioral patterns, and other matters and there were severe limitations on inter-mixing, not to think of inter-marriage.

== Assimilation with Proto-Indo-Europeans ==
When Proto-Indo-Europeans arrived on the scene, they gradually effected assimilation, based primarily on their concepts of work and quality, which led to the development of caste-based society or it could be the extension of an older system. The assimilation was not easy and took many centuries, and was achieved through both conflict and cordiality.

In the religious texts of Baudhayana Dharmasutra (around 5th-6th century BC), it has been mentioned that while Anga and the middle country has been partially Aryanised, Pundra, Banga and Kalinga had only come in contact with the Aryans or Proto-Indo-Europeans of northern India.

In the 4th century AD, it is learned from the Susunia edicts, in Prakrit and Sanskrit, that Chandravarman, son of Simhavarman, ruled at Pushkarana (modern Pakhanna). The extent of his dominions may have been more or less coterminous with ancient Rarh region or south-west Bengal. According to the inscription on the Allahabad pillar Chandravarman was defeated by Samudragupta and the area became a part of the Gupta Empire. The area was for many years part of Dandabhukti and Bardhamanbhukti.

In the old Jain book Acaranga Sutra (around 4th century AD) there is mention of Sumha and Ladha (Rarh?) and there too the reference is to an area inhabited by uncivilised and barbaric people. Many historians opine that assimilation with Proto-Indo-Europeans took place first in northern and eastern Bengal and then in western Bengal. This has also been the broad course of the spread of Buddhism and Jainism in Bengal. There is ample evidence of pre-eminence of Aryan religion and culture in West Bengal from around 6th century AD.

== Mallabhum kingdom ==
Rulers of Mallabhum
| Ruler | Years |
|---|---|
| Adi Malla | 694 - 710 |
| Jay Malla | 710 - 720 |
| Benu Malla | 720 - 733 |
| Kinu Malla | 733 - 742 |
| Indra Malla | 742 - 757 |
| Kanu Malla | 757 - 764 |
| Dha (Jhau) Malla | 764 - 775 |
| Shur Malla | 775 - 795 |
| Kanak Malla | 795 - 807 |
| Kandarpa Malla | 807 - 828 |
| Sanatan Malla | 828 - 841 |
| Kharga Malla | 841 - 862 |
| Durjan (Durjay) Malla | 862 - 906 |
| Yadav Malla | 906 - 919 |
| Jagannath Malla | 919 - 931 |
| Birat Malla | 931 - 946 |
| Mahadev Malla | 946 - 977 |
| Durgadas Malla | 977 - 994 |
| Jagat Malla | 994 - 1007 |
| Ananta Malla | 1007 - 1015 |
| Rup Malla | 1015 - 1029 |
| Sundar Malla | 1029 - 1053 |
| Kumud Malla | 1053 - 1074 |
| Krishna Malla | 1074 - 1084 |
| Rup II (Jhap) Malla | 1084 - 1097 |
| Prakash Malla | 1097 - 1102 |
| Pratap Malla | 1102 - 1113 |
| Sindur Malla | 1113 - 1129 |
| Sukhomoy(Shuk) Malla | 1129 - 1142 |
| Banamali Malla | 1142 - 1156 |
| Yadu/Jadu Malla | 1156 - 1167 |
| Jiban Malla | 1167 - 1185 |
| Ram (Kshetra) Malla | 1185 - 1209 |
| Gobinda Malla | 1209 - 1240 |
| Bhim Malla | 1240 - 1263 |
| Katar(Khattar) Malla | 1263 - 1295 |
| Prithwi Malla | 1295 - 1319 |
| Tapa Malla | 1319 - 1334 |
| Dinabandhu Malla | 1334 - 1345 |
| Kinu/Kanu II Malla | 1345 - 1358 |
| Shur Malla II | 1358 - 1370 |
| Shiv Singh Malla | 1370 - 1407 |
| Madan Malla | 1407 - 1420 |
| Durjan Malla II | 1420 - 1437 |
| Uday Malla | 1437 - 1460 |
| Chandra Malla | 1460 - 1501 |
| Bir Malla | 1501 - 1554 |
| Dhari Malla | 1554 - 1565 |
| Hambir Malla Dev | 1565 - 1620 |
| Dhari Hambir Malla Dev | 1620 - 1626 |
| Raghunath Singha Dev | 1626 - 1656 |
| Bir Singha Dev | 1656 - 1682 |
| Durjan Singha Dev | 1682 - 1702 |
| Raghunath Singha Dev II | 1702 - 1712 |
| Gopal Singha Dev | 1712 - 1748 |
| Chaitanya Singha Dev | 1748 - 1801 |
| Madhav Singha Dev | 1801 - 1809 |
| Gopal Singha Dev II | 1809 - 1876 |
| Ramkrishna Singha Dev | 1876 - 1885 |
| Dwhajamoni Devi | 1885 - 1889 |
| Nilmoni Singha Dev | 1889 - 1903 |
| no king | 1903 - 1930 |
| Kalipada Singha Thakur | 1930 - 1983 |

From around 7th century AD till around the advent of British rule, for around a millennium, history of Bankura district is identical with the rise and fall of the Hindu Rajas of Bishnupur.

Romesh Chunder Dutt wrote in the late 19th century, "The ancient Rajas of Bishnupur trace back their history to a time when Hindus were still reigning in Delhi, and the name of the Muslims was not yet heard in India. Indeed, they could already count five centuries of rule over the western frontier tracts of Bengal before Bakhtiyar Khalji wrested the province from the Hindus. The Muslim conquest of Bengal, however, made no difference to the Bishnupur princes... these jungle kings were little known to the Muslim rulers of the fertile portions of Bengal, and were never interfered with. For long centuries, therefore, the kings of Bishnupur were supreme within their extensive territories. At a later period of Muslim rule, and when the Mughal power extended and consolidated itself on all sides, a Mughal army sometimes made its appearance near Bishnupur with claims of tribute, and tribute was probably sometimes paid. Nevertheless, the Subahdars of Murshidabad, never had that firm hold over the Rajas of Bishnupur which they had over the closer and more recent Rajaships of Burdwan and Birbhum. As the Burdwan Raj grew in power, the Bishnupur family fell into decay; Maharaja Kirti Chand of Burdwan attacked and added to his zamindari large slices of his neighbour's territories. The Marathas completed the ruin of the Bishnupur house, which is an impoverished zamindari in the present day."

The origins of the Rajas of Bishnupur is somewhat clouded in mystery. According to O'Malley, all through the centuries, they were acknowledged as the kings of Bagdis. However, the Rajas of Bishnupur and many of their followers have laid claims to their being Kshatriyas linked to the Kshatriya clans of northern India. The claims seem to have originated or gathered momentum at a later period when assimilation of the region with the Proto-Indo-Europeans gained firm roots. The Rajas of Bishnupur were also known as Malla kings. Malla is a Sanskrit word meaning wrestler but there could be some links with the Mal tribes of the area, who had an intimate connection with the Bagdis.

The area around Bishnupur was called Mallabhum The core area would cover present-day Bankura police station area (excluding Chhatna), Onda, Bishnupur, Kotulpur and Indas. In olden days the term was used for a much larger area, which probably was the furthest extent of the Bishnupur kingdom. In the north it stretched from Damin-i-koh in Santhal Parganas to Midnapore in the south. It included the eastern part of Bardhaman and parts of Chota Nagpur in the west. Portions of the district appear to have been originally the homes of aboriginal tribes, who were gradually subdued. The Khatra region was Dhalbhum, the Raipur region was Tungbhum, and the Chhatna region was Samantabhum. They were eventually overshadowed by the Malla kings of Bishnupur. There also are references in old scripts to Varahabhumi or Varabhumi (present-day Barabhum) on whose borders run Darikesi river, and Sekhara mountain (probably present-day Pareshnath).

=== Adi Malla ===
Adi Malla was the founder of the Malla dynasty. There is a story associated with his beginning. In 695 AD, a prince of one of the royal families of northern India made a pilgrimage with his wife to the Jagannath temple at Puri. He halted in the midst of a great forest at Laugram, 8.4 kilometres (5.2 mi) from Kotulpur. He left his wife who was about to give birth to a child in the care of a Brahmin. The wife gave birth to a son and they remained back in Laugram. When the child was around 7 years old, he started working as a cowherd. The child started showing signs of greatness and was ultimately trained as a warrior. When he was 15 years old he had no equal as a wrestler in the territory all around. It was this that earned him the sobriquet of Adi Malla, the original or unique wrestler. He became a chieftain by the grace of Raja of Padampur, near modern Joypur, 12.8 kilometres (8.0 mi) from Laugram. The Raja made him a grant of Laugram and some villages around it. The veracity of this story is questioned and there are other versions of this story to back up the Kshatriya links of the Bishnupur kings.

Adi Malla ruled in Laugram for 33 years and has been known as the Bagdi Raja. He was succeeded by his son, Jay Malla, who invaded Padampur and captured the fort, then the power-centre. Jay Malla extended his domains and shifted his capital to Bishnupur. The subsequent kings steadily extended their kingdom. Among the more renowned are: Kalu Malla, the fourth in line, Kau Malla, the sixth in line, Jhau Malla, the seventh in line, and Sur Malla, the eighth in line, who defeated the Raja of Bagri, a place now in northern Midnapore. He was followed by 40 other kings, all of whom were known as Mallas or Mallabaninath, which means lords of Mallabhum or Mallabani. Family records show that they were independent of foreign powers.

=== Bir Hambir Malla ===
Bir Hambir, the 49th ruler of the Malla dynasty who flourished around 1586 AD and ruled in 16th-17th century, was a contemporary of the Mughal emperor Akbar. He was involved on the side of Mughals in their struggle against the Afghans and is mentioned by Muslim historians. He paid an annual tribute to the Muslim viceroys of Bengal and thus acknowledged their suzerainty.

Bir Hambir was both powerful and pious. He was converted to Vaishnavism by Srinivasa. There is mention in two Vaishnava works, Prem-vilasa of Nityananda Das (alias Balaram Das) and Bhakti Ratnakara of Narahari Chakrabarti, about Srinivasa and other bhaktas (devotees) being robbed by Bir Hambir, when they were travelling from Vrindavan to Gaur with a number of Vaishanava manuscripts. However, Bir Hambir was so moved by Srinivasa's reading of Bhagavata that he converted to Vaishnavism and gave Srinivasa a rich endowment of land and money. He introduced the worship of Madan Mohan in Bishnupur.

=== Raghunath Singha ===
Raghunath Singha, who followed Bir Hambir, was the first Bishnupur Raja family got the title of Singha(Lion) as an honour due to the strength of Rasliimlli. It is said that he was conferred upon with this title by the Nawab of Murshidabad. Bishnupur kingdom had entered its golden age. With exquisite palaces and temples built during the period that followed Bishnupur was reputed to be the most renowned city in the world, more beautiful than the house of Indra in heaven. However, it has also been recorded that while these royal patrons of Hindu art and religion were busy building temples they had lost much of their independence and sunk to the position of tributary princes. Raghunath Singha built the temples of Shyam Rai, Jor Bangla and Kalachand between 1643 and 1656.

Raghunath Singha was married to the daughter of Shobha Singha, Zamindar of Midnapore. During his reign, he is said to be infatuated with a Persian dancer, called Lalbai. He took her under his protection and later dug a large pond in her name (Lalbandh pond). After he decided to marry Lalbai, Raghunath Singha was killed by his queen.

=== Bir Singha ===
Bir Singha built the present fort, the temple of Lalji in 1658, and seven big lakes named Lalbandh, Krishnabandh, Gantatbandh, Jamunabandh, Kalindibandh, Shyambandh, and Pokabandh. His queen, Siromani or Chudamani, built the temples of Madan Mohan and Murali Mohan in 1665. He walled up alive all his sons, eighteen in number. The youngest, Durjan, alone escaped, having been kept in hiding by the servants.

=== Durjan Singha ===
Durjan Singha built the Madan Mohan temple in 1694. According to family records, the kings of Bishnupur continued to pay tribute to the Muslim rulers but they were free to do things internally. There was no interference by the Muslim rulers in the internal affairs of Bishnupur. This is also confirmed by Muslim historians. The status of the Raja of Bishnupur was that of a tributary prince, exempted from personal attendance at the court at Murshidabad, and represented there by a resident.

== Maratha raids ==
The Bishnupur Rajas who were at the summit of their fortunes towards the end of the 17th century, started declining in the first half of the 18th century. First, the Maharaja of Burdwan seized the Fatehpur Mahal, and then the Maratha invasions laid waste their country.

=== Gopal Singha Dev ===
Gopal Singha (1730–1745) was a pious king but was not fit to cope with the difficulties that faced his kingdom. He issued an edict that people of Mallabhum should count their beads and chant Harinam (name of God) every evening at sunset. In 1742, when the Marathas, under Bhaskar Rao, attacked Bishnupur, the troops put up a spirited defence but then Gopal Singha retreated within the fort and ordered the troops and citizens to pray to Madan Mohan to save the city. It is believed that Madan Mohan responded and the cannons were fired without human assistance. The truth probably is that the Maratha cavalry were unable to pierce the strong fortifications and retired. While they failed to take the fort and pillage the treasury, the Marathas harried the less protected parts of the kingdom. The Maratha chief, Sheobhat, made Bishnupur his headquarters in 1760 during the invasion of Shah Alam. The Marathas fell with their heaviest weight on border principalities such as Bishnupur and Birbhum. Exactions of a hundred sorts reduced the once powerful kingdom to poverty. The tenants fled and the country became desolate.

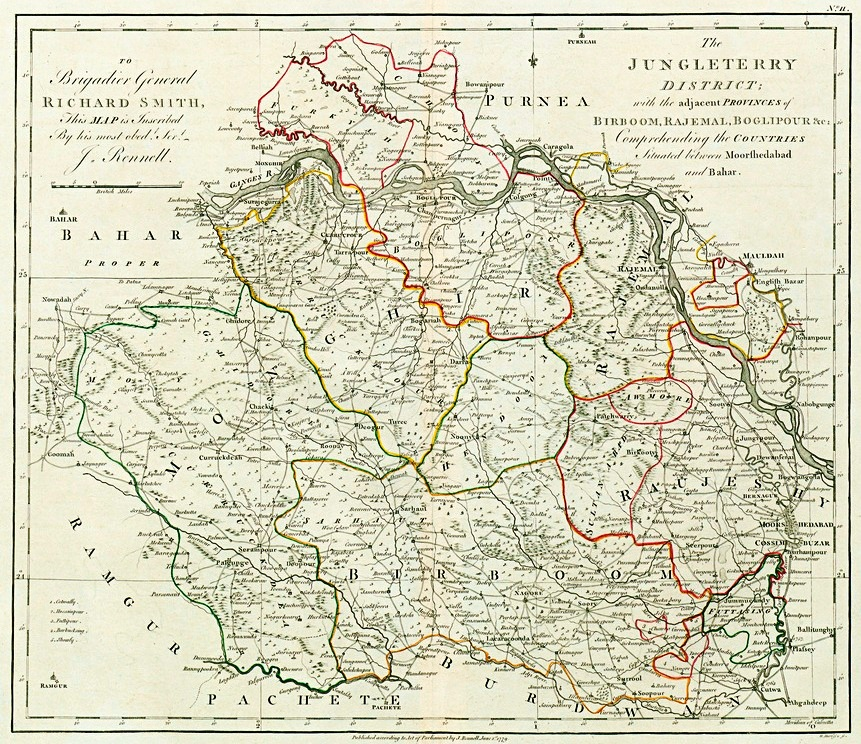
1779 map of the Jungle Terry District.

=== Chaitanya Singha Dev ===
Chaitanya Singha was another pious ruler unfit to face the difficulties. As he was too involved in religious matters he did not have time for administrative matters. He faced internal feuds. Damodar Singha, a cousin of his, tried to gain power. He was able to convince the court at Murshidabad about his capabilities. Initially, Siraj ud-Daulah lent him forces but he was unable to capture Bishnupur. Later, after the British defeated Siraj, Mir Jafar lent him stronger forces. He succeeded in taking Bishnupur, and Chaitanya Singha escaped to Kolkata with the idol of Madan Gopal, but the British restored the latter to power. However, intrigue and litigation continued for many years. Litigation ruined the Bishnupur Raj family and eventually in 1806, the estate was sold for arrears of land revenue and bought up by the Maharaja of Burdwan.

== Early British administration ==
Bishnupur was ceded to the British with the rest of Burdwan chakla in 1760. The Marathas had laid the country waste and famine of 1770 completed the misery of the kingdom. A large section of the population was swept away, cultivation fell, and lawlessness spread. The once powerful king had been reduced to the status of a mere zamindar. In 1787, Bishnupur was united with Birbhum to form a separate administrative unit, the headquarters was shifted to Suri, and a rebellious situation prevailed. The situation was so bad that the people of Bishnupur came to be known as Chuars or robbers. Bankura continued to be one district with Birbhum till 1793, when it was transferred to the Burdwan collectorate.

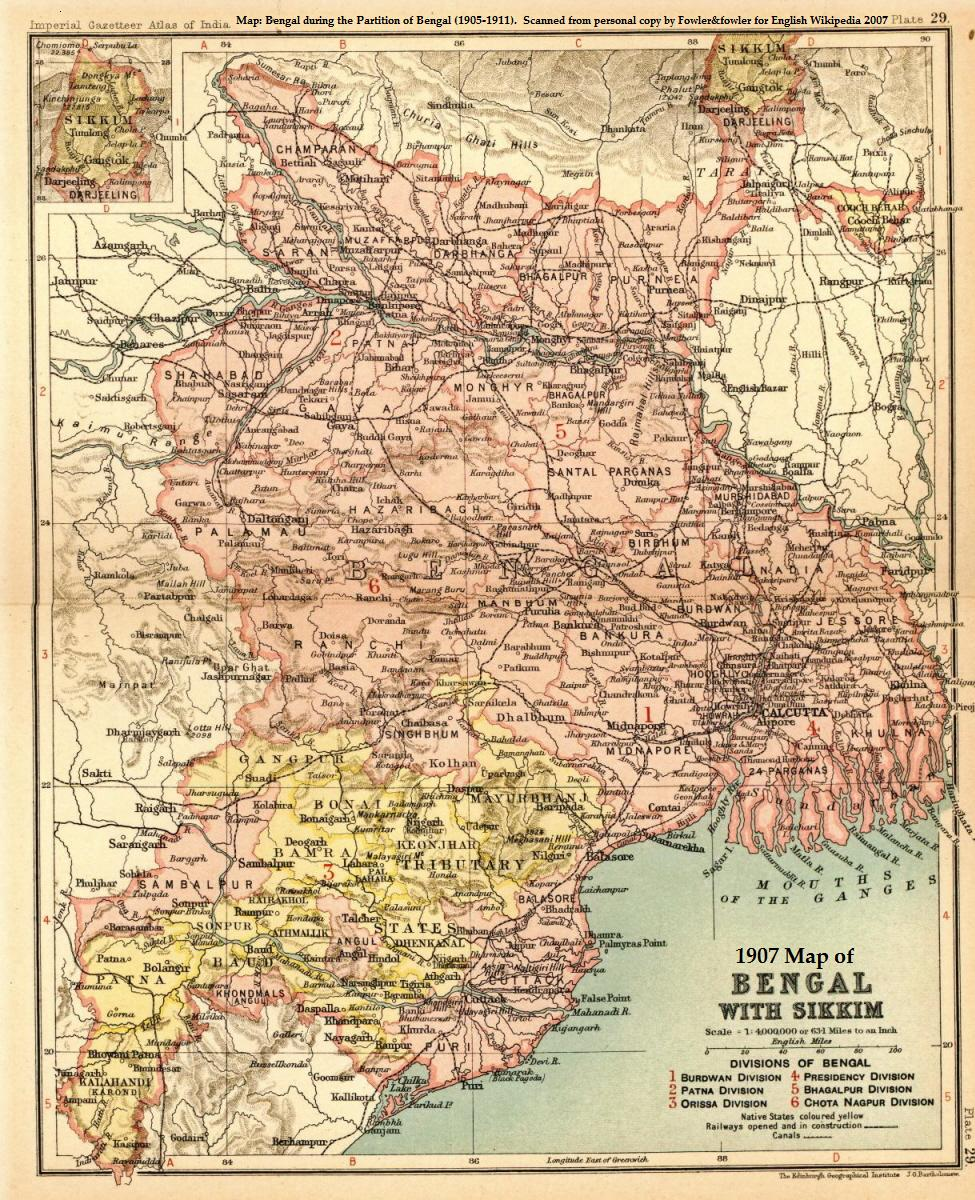
1907 Map of Bengal with Sikkim

=== Chuar rebellion ===
Towards the end of the 18th century certain portions of the district around Raipur was affected by the Chuar Rebellion. The leader of the rebels was Durjan Singh, a former zamindar of Raipur. He had a following of about 1,500 men and created havoc in certain areas. The police force was simply not in a position to control the situation. At the time Bankura appears to have been part of Jungle Mahals. While the Chuars continued to be a menace, Bankura played an important role in the commercial department of East India Company. Sonamukhi had a head factory with 31 subordinate ones, including one at Patrasayar, as well as at Surul and Ilambazar in Birbhum. The disturbances of the Chuars in 1832 in the western part of the district lead to the disbandment of the Jungle Mahals in 1833. While Bishnupur was transferred to Burdwan, most of the district formed a part of Manbhum and what was known as North-west Frontier Agency. In 1872, the parganas of Sonamukhi, Indas, Kotulpur, Shergarh and Senpahari were transferred to Burdwan.

== Present shape ==
In 1879, the district acquired its present shape with the thanas of Khatra and Raipur and the outpost of Simplapal being transferred from Manbhum, and the thanas of Sonamukhi, Kotulpur and Indas being retransferred from Burdwan. However, it was known for sometime as West Burdwan and in 1881 came to be known as Bankura district.
