= Jagat Malla =

Raja of Mallabhum from 994 to 1007

19th Raja of Mallabhum
- Reign: 994–1007
- Predecessor: Durgadas Malla
- Successor: Ananta Malla
- Religion: Hinduism

Jagat Malla was the nineteenth king of the Malla dynasty. He ruled from 994 to 1007 CE.

== History ==
Jagat Malla gets special attention in the history of the Malla dynasty, as it is believed that as per the direction of the Goddess Jagadamba Ma Mrinmoyee, he shifted his capital from Pradyumnapur to Bishnupur. According to myth, Jagat Malla once went to Bishnupur for a hunt. The then Bishnupur was covered with a dense forest. At that place he noticed that a heron, sitting on a branch of a tree, repeatedly attacked one of his hunting dogs. Upon seeing that he was very astonished and thought that the place has definitely some supernatural power. Then Ma Mrinmoyee appeared to him and told him to shift his capital to Bishnupur and he did so. It is told that Bishnupur was previously a village and named so as per the name of the guardian deity Vishnu. In 997 CE., Jagat Malla established Mrinmoyee temple. During his rule, Bishnupur was a very developed and also was a self-sufficient kingdom. Jagat Malla reigned for thirteen years. There were several Malla Kings after Jagat Malla, among them Prithwi Malla (1295–1319), Dinabandhu Malla (1334–1345) and Shiv Singh Malla (1370–1460).

== Sources ==
- Dasgupta, Gautam Kumar; Biswas, Samira; Mallik, Rabiranjan (2009), Heritage Tourism: An Anthropological Journey to Bishnupur, A Mittal Publication, p. 20, ISBN 978-8183242943
