= Mallabhum kingdom =

Kingdom in present-day West Bengal, India (694–1947)

- 694–1947
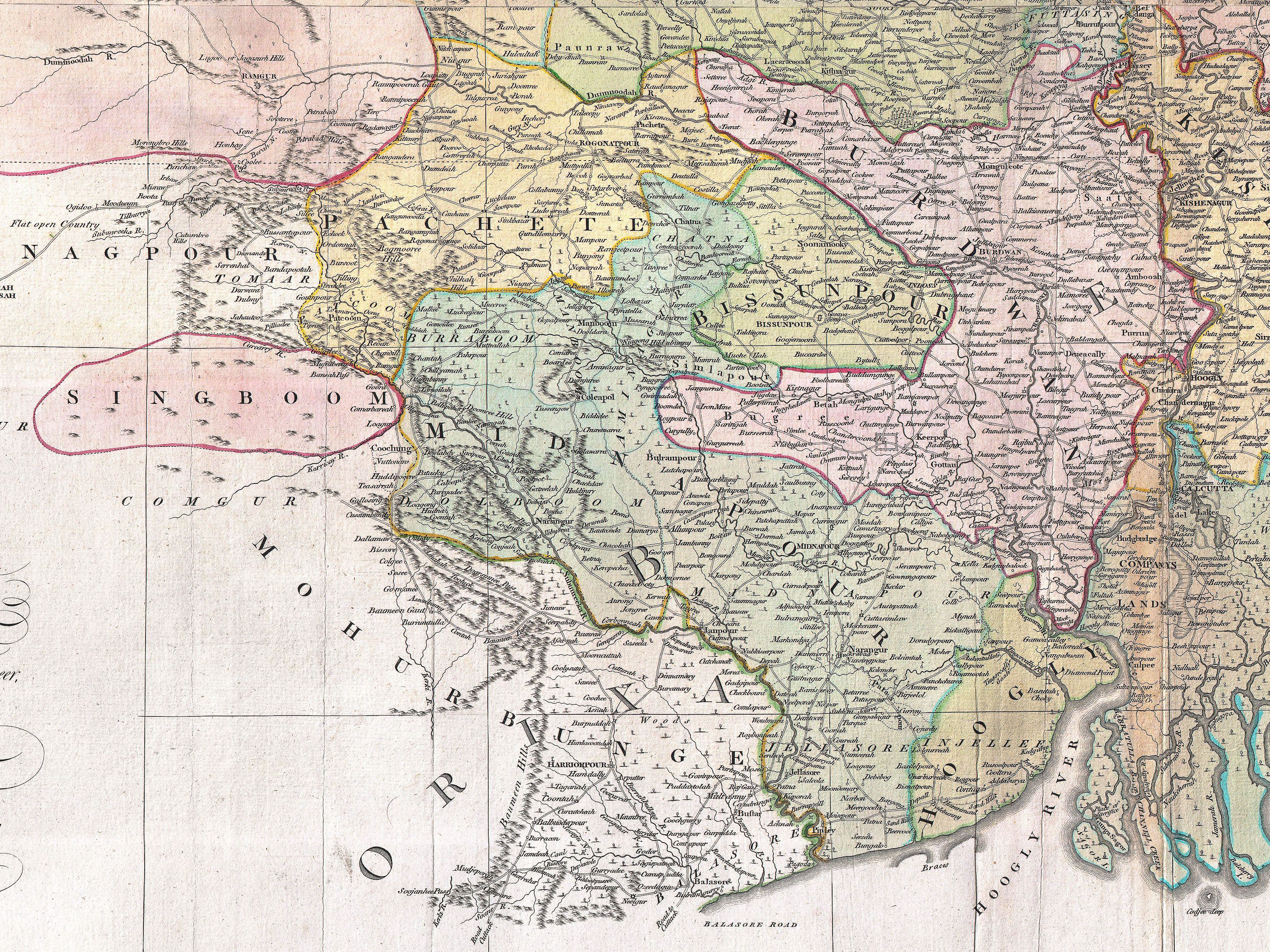
- Bishnupur Estate on James Rennell's Mid-18th Century map.
- Capital: Pradyumnapur; Bishnupur
- Common languages: Bengali; Sanskrit
- Religion: Hinduism
- Government: Monarchy (until 1760); Zamindari (from 1760)
- Maharaja
  - 694–710 CE: Adi Malla
  - 1930–1983 CE: Kalipada Singha Thakur
- Historical era: Classical India; Medieval India; Early Modern Period
  - Established: 694
  - Disestablished: 29 December 1947
Preceded by	Succeeded by
Gauda Kingdom	British Empire
- Today part of: West Bengal

Mallabhum (The country originally known as Mallabhoom or Mallabani Bengali: মল্লভূম or Bishnupur kingdom) was the kingdom ruled by the Malla kings of Bishnupur, primarily in the present Bankura district in Indian state of West Bengal.

== History ==
=== Territory of the Mallabhum ===
Mallabhum was a territory which included Bankura, a part of Burdwan, Birbhum, Santhal Parganas, Midnapur and also a part of Purulia. The Malla Rajas ruled over the vast territory in the south-western part of present West Bengal and a part of southeastern Jharkhand.

==== Extent ====
From around 7th century CE until the advent of British rule, the history of Bankura district is identical with the rise and fall of the Hindu Rajas of Bishnupur.

== Administration ==
=== Mahals ===
According to Bhattacharjee, Tarun Dev (1982) During the Malla period, society was primarily organised around the village. The tax collectors were known as Gumasta, with their assistants called Aat Pahari or Paik. The village headman, responsible for overseeing the community, was referred to as the Mukhiya or Mandal, and was considered the protector of the village. The Malla kings maintained several service groups, and due to a shortage of money, they often compensated these groups with land rather than salaries. This land was of two types: Panchaki jamin, which had a small tax, and Bepanchaki jamin, which was exempt from tax. The lands were named based on the services provided, such as.

1. Senapati Mahal: Land for the head of the soldiers.

2. Mahalbera Mahal: Land for the sentries.

3. Chharidar Mahal: Land for the bodyguards.

==== 4. Jungle Mahal ====
According to LSS O’Malley:

Large portions of the old estate of Bishnupur were under jungle and the timber, firewood, honey, wax, etc., which they yielded, formed a valuable source of revenue. The right of collecting these jungle products was farmed out by the Raja, and the revenue he obtained thereby was called the Jungle Mahal, and had nothing to do with arable land.

The Bishnupur Raj maintained a distinct Jungle Mahal, which consisted solely of forested areas, where forest resources were regularly harvested and sold.

==== 5. Ghatwals Mahal ====
The ghatwals were a ‘quasi military body of men employed by the Rajas of Bishnupur’ who were posted as guards at various strategic Ghats or passes in hills and uplands. They also did police duties and acted as peacekeepers. Rent-free lands given to the ghatwals by the Rajas from time to time came to be known as Ghatwali lands. Though at the time of the Permanent Settlement (between 1791 and 1802) the area of lands held by ghatwals was not known later surveys of 1854-56 and 1879-1887 estimated the area of the ghatwali land in the Bishnupur Estate to be about 170,000 acres

== Bishnupur and His Alliance with the Mughals ==
In the late 16th century, Bir Hambir, the ruler of Bishnupur, allied with Mughal general Man Singh during Akbar's campaign against Qutlu Khan Lohani, the Afghan ruler of North Orissa. Despite being ignored by Jagat Singh, Man Singh's son, Bir Hambir bravely rescued him from an Afghan ambush, solidifying his alliance with the Mughals. This act highlighted Bir Hambir's courage, strategic brilliance, and enduring legacy as a wise leader.

== Decline Under British Rule ==
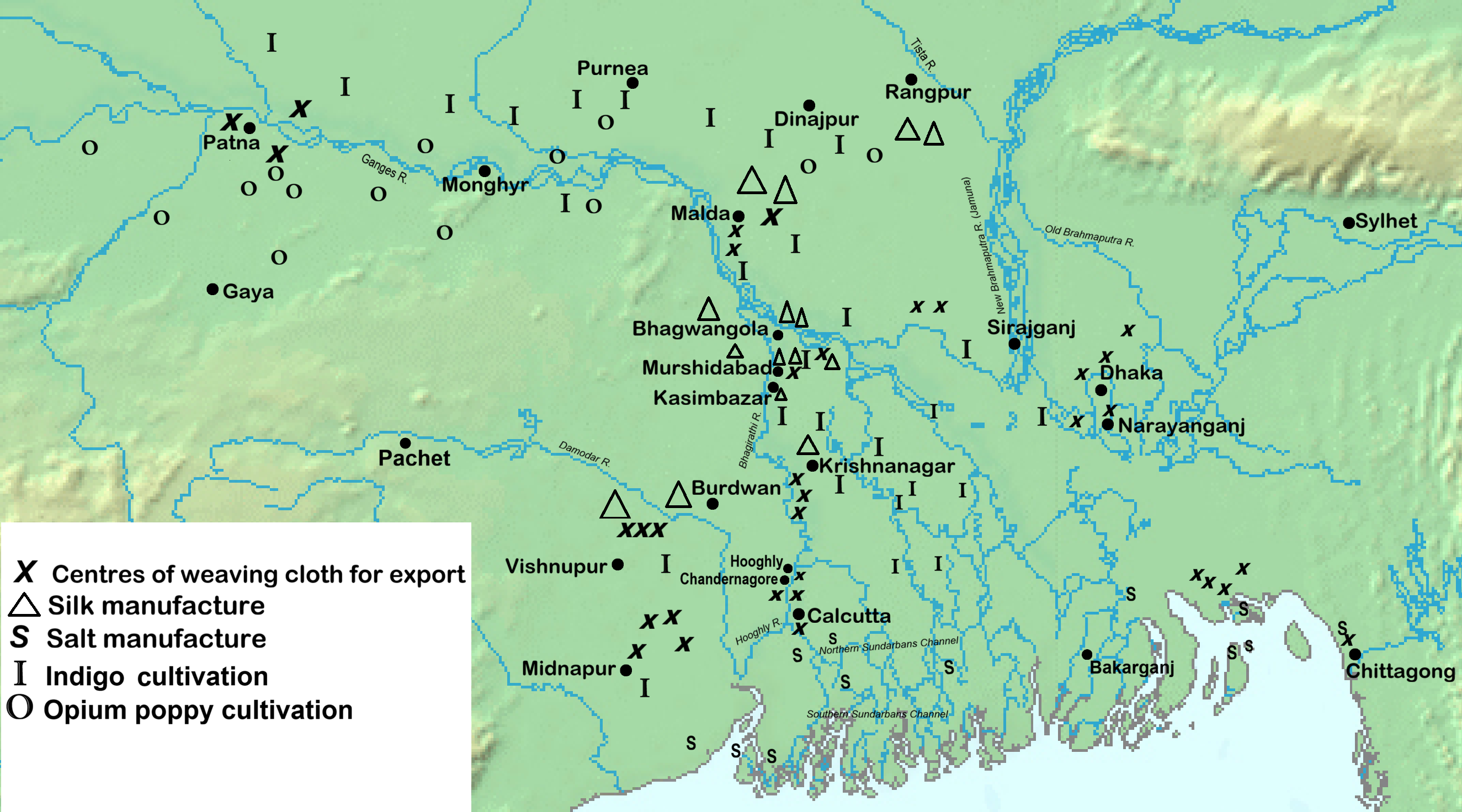
Centres of cloth weaving for export and of Bengal silk manufacture (1740–1828)

=== Great Bishnupur famine of 1770 ===
Around 1770–71, as the "great famine" swept through the region, the South Western Highlands of Bengal had transformed into a land of the dead. According to W.W. Hunter, the situation was summed up in his famous Annals of Rural Bengal:

“Before the end of 1770, one-third of the population was officially calculated to have disappeared; in June the deaths were returned as ‘six is to sixteen of the whole inhabitants’, and it was estimated that ‘one half of cultivators and payers of revenue will perish with hunger.’…in 1771, it was discovered that the remnant of the population would not suffice to till the land”.

The greatest threat to the company was depopulation, which, despite the famine, led them to continually pressure the local rulers—the now-weakened Rajas of Bishnupur (referred to as Bishenpore by Hunter). In Bishnupur, hundreds of villages were completely abandoned, and even in the larger towns, fewer than one-fourth of the houses remained occupied. Purnia and Bishnupur were the two districts in Bengal that suffered the most from the famine. In 1772, Warren Hastings estimated that by that time, one-third of the population had perished.

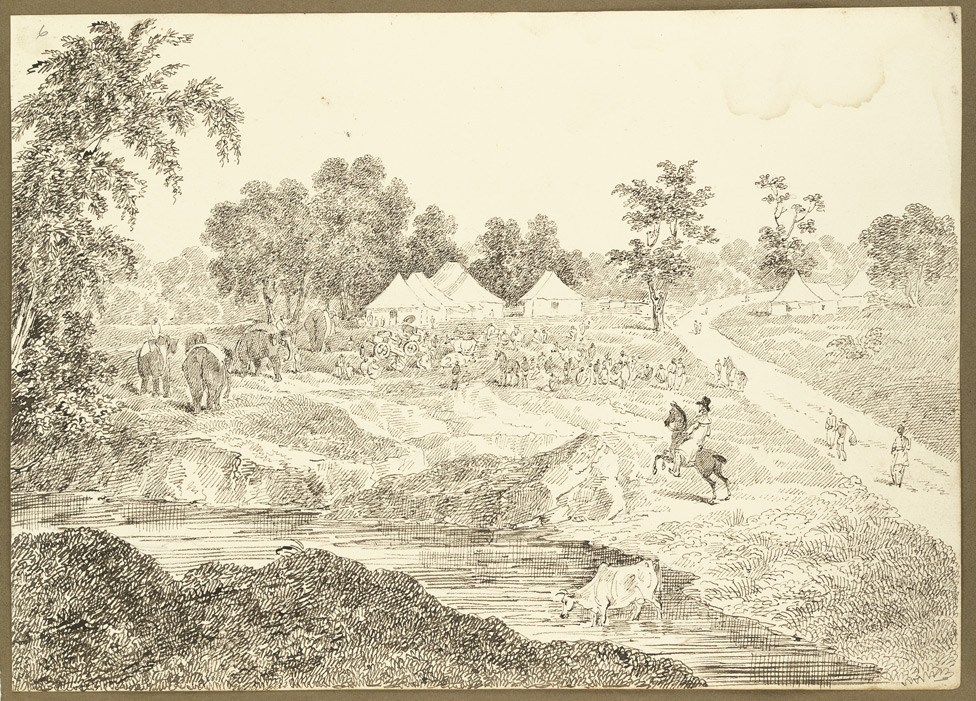
Bishnupur 1823, the capital of the Malla rulers of Bengal, drawing by Charles D'Oyly

=== Rebellion at Bishnupur (1788-1809) ===
Between 1788 and 1809, the Chuars and Paiks of the Bishnupur and Midnapore parganas revolted against the British East India Company under the leadership of Madhav Singha Dev.

== List of Malla kings ==
Malla's started their own calendar that is Malla era (Mallabda). It is told that Malla era started from Indra Dwadasi day in the year 102 Bengali calendar of the month Bhadro (August- September).

Sl. No.	Name of the king	Gregorian calendar (in CE)	Bengali calendar	Malla calendar	Reign (year)
1	Adi Malla	694	102	1	16
2	Jay Malla	710	117	16	10
3	Benu Malla	720	127	26	13
4	Kinu Malla	733	140	39	9
5	Indra Malla	742	149	48	15
6	Kanu Malla	757	164	63	7
7	Dha Malla (Jhau)	764	171	70	11
8	Shur Malla	775	182	81	20
9	Kanak Malla	795	202	101	12
10	Kandarpa Malla	807	214	113	21
11	Sanatan Malla	828	235	134	13
12	Kharga Malla	841	248	147	21
13	Durjan Malla (Durjay)	862	269	168	44
14	Yadav Malla	906	313	212	13
15	Jagannath Malla	919	326	225	12
16	Birat Malla	931	338	237	15
17	Mahadev Malla	946	353	252	31
18	Durgadas Malla	977	384	283	17
19	Jagat Malla	994	401	300	13
20	Ananta Malla	1007	414	313	8
21	Rup Malla	1015	422	321	14
22	Sundar Malla	1029	436	335	24
23	Kumud Malla	1053	460	359	21
24	Krishna Malla	1074	481	380	10
25	Rup Malla II (Jhap)	1084	491	390	13
26	Prakash Malla	1097	504	403	5
27	Pratap Malla	1102	509	408	11
28	Sindur Malla	1113	520	419	16
29	Sukhomoy Malla (Shuk)	1129	536	435	13
30	Banamali Malla	1142	549	448	14
31	Yadu/Jadu Malla	1156	563	462	11
32	Jiban Malla	1167	574	473	13
33	Ram Malla	1185	592	491	24
34	Gobinda Malla	1209	616	515	31
35	Bhim Malla	1240	647	546	23
36	Katar Malla (Kattar/Khattar)	1263	670	569	32
37	Prithwi Malla	1295	702	601	24
38	Tapa Malla	1319	726	625	15
39	Dinabandhu Malla	1334	741	640	11
40	Kinu/Kanu II Malla	1345	752	651	13
41	Shur Malla II	1358	765	664	12
42	Shiv Singh Malla	1370	777	676	37
43	Madan Malla	1407	814	713	13
44	Durjan Malla II (Durjay)	1420	827	726	17
45	Uday Malla	1437	844	743	23
46	Chandra Malla	1460	867	766	41
47	Bir Malla	1501	908	807	53
48	Dhari Malla	1554	961	860	11
49	Hambir Malla Dev (Bir Hambir)	1565	972	871	55
50	Dhari Hambir Malla Dev	1620	1027	926	6
51	Raghunath Singha Dev	1626	1033	932	30
52	Bir Singha Dev	1656	1063	962	26
53	Durjan Singha Dev	1682	1089	988	20
54	Raghunath Singha Dev II	1702	1109	1008	10
55	Gopal Singha Dev I	1712	1119	1018	36
56	Chaitanya Singha Dev	1748	1155	1054	53
57	Madhav Singha Dev	1801	1208	1107	8
58	Gopal Singha Dev II	1809	1216	1115	67
59	Ramkrishna Singha Dev	1876	1283	1182	9
	Dwhaja Moni Devi	1885	1292	1191	4
60	Nilmoni Singha Dev	1889	1296	1195	14
	Churamoni Devi (Regency)	1903	1310	1209	14
61	Kalipada Singha Thakur	1930–1983	1337 – 1390	1236–1289	53

== Temples ==
According to Dr. Bloch, Superintendent of the Archaeological Survey of India, Eastern Circle, the twelve date temples range in chronological order as follows:

Malla Calendar	Gregorian Calendar	Temple	Built By
928	1622	Malleswar	Bir Singha Dev
949	1643	Syam Rai	Raghunath Singha Dev
961	1655	Jor Bangla	Raghunath Singha Dev
962	1656	Kala Chand	Raghunath Singha Dev
964	1658	Lalji	Bir Singha Dev
971	1665	Madan Gopal	Churamoni(Siromoni Devi), wife of Bir Singha
971	1665	Murali Mohan	Churamoni(Siromoni Devi), wife of Bir Singha
1000	1694	Madan Mohan	Durjan Singha Dev
1032	1726	Jor Mandir	Gopal Singha Dev I
1035	1729	Radha Gobind	Krishna Singha, son of Gopal Singha Dev I
1043	1737	Radha Madhab	Churamoni, wife of Gopal Singha Dev I
1064	1758	Radha Syam	Chaitanya Singha Dev

== In popular culture ==
The dhrupad gharana of Bishnupur kingdom

=== Film ===
- Eastern Zonal Cultural Centre, Kolkata, brings you the Fourth Documentary from 𝗢𝗻𝗹𝗶𝗻𝗲 𝗔𝗿𝗰𝗵𝗶𝘃𝗲 𝗗𝗼𝗰𝘂𝗺𝗲𝗻𝘁𝗮𝗿𝘆 𝗙𝗶𝗹𝗺 𝗙𝗲𝘀𝘁𝗶𝘃𝗮𝗹. The video is a presentation on the dhrupad gharana of Bishnupur kingdom.

== Gallery ==
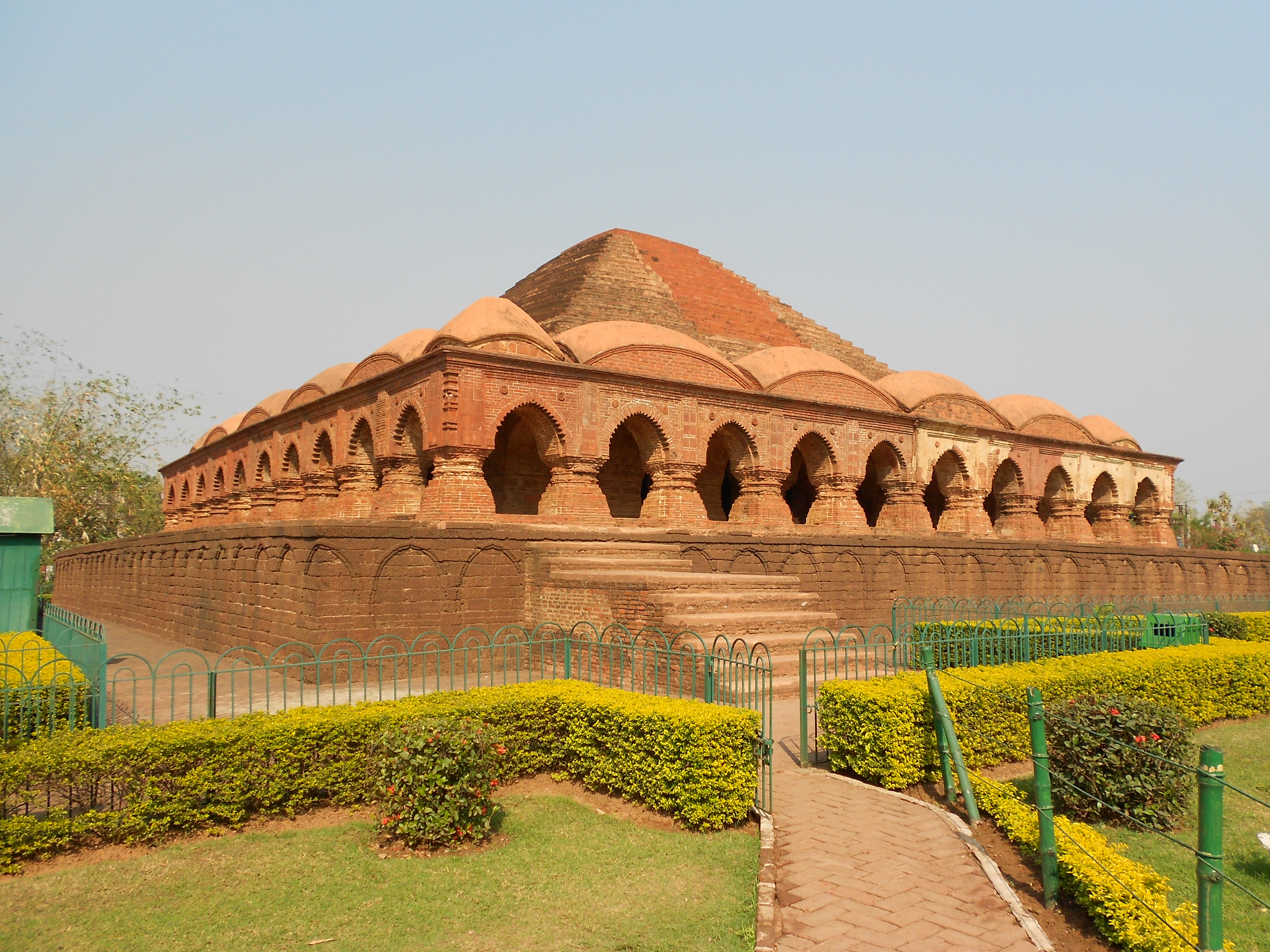
Rasmancha (1600 CE)

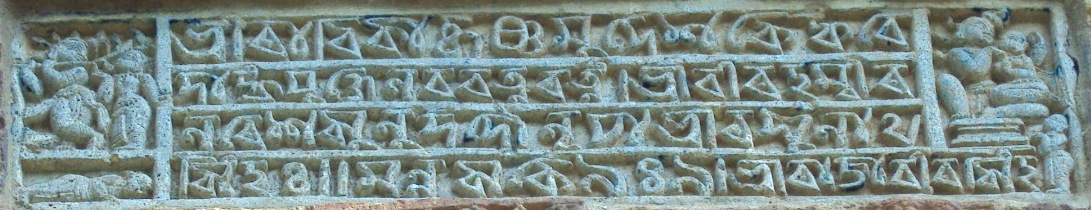
Inscription on Shyamrai Temple (1643 CE)

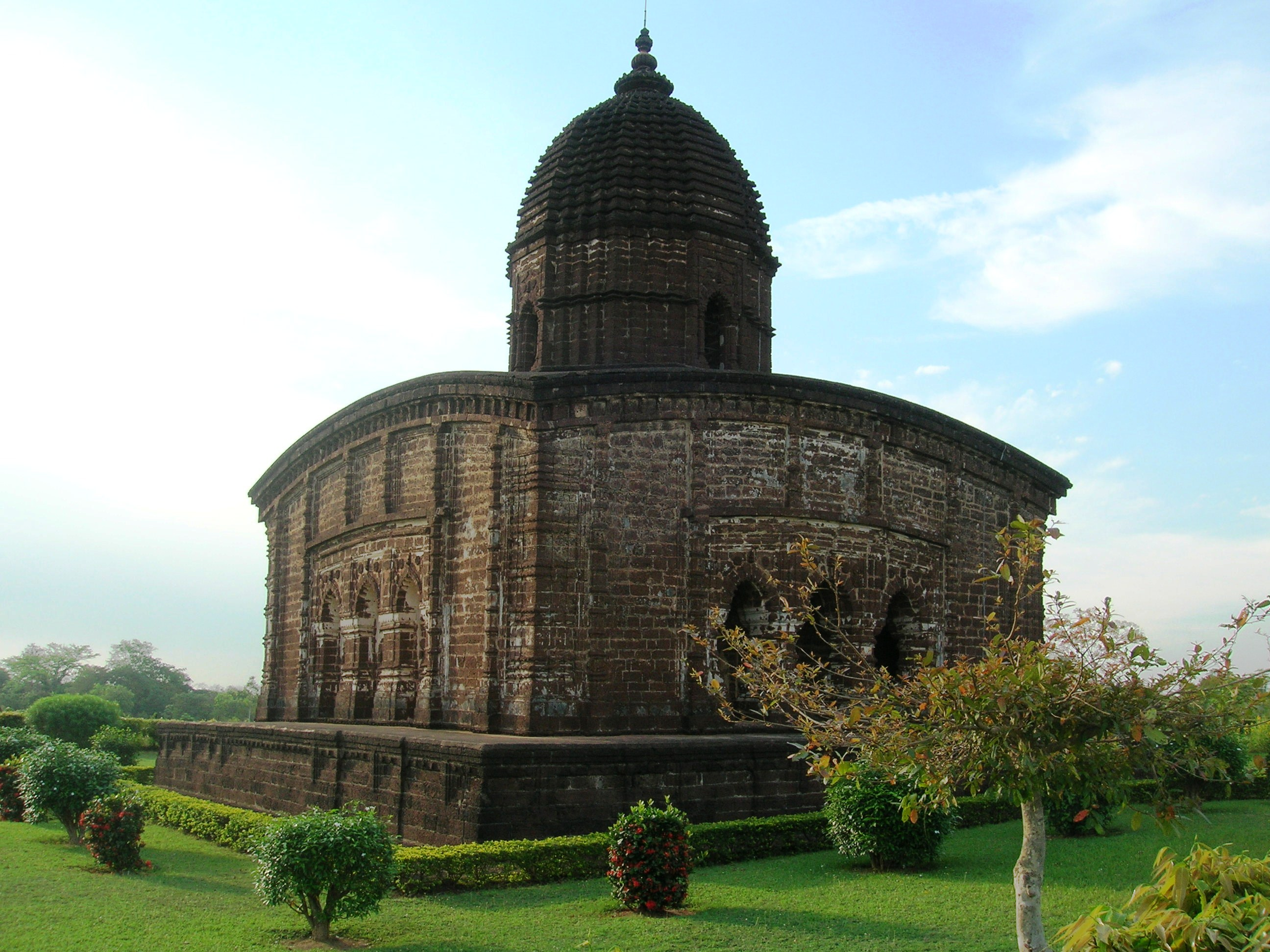
Jor Mandir (1726 CE)

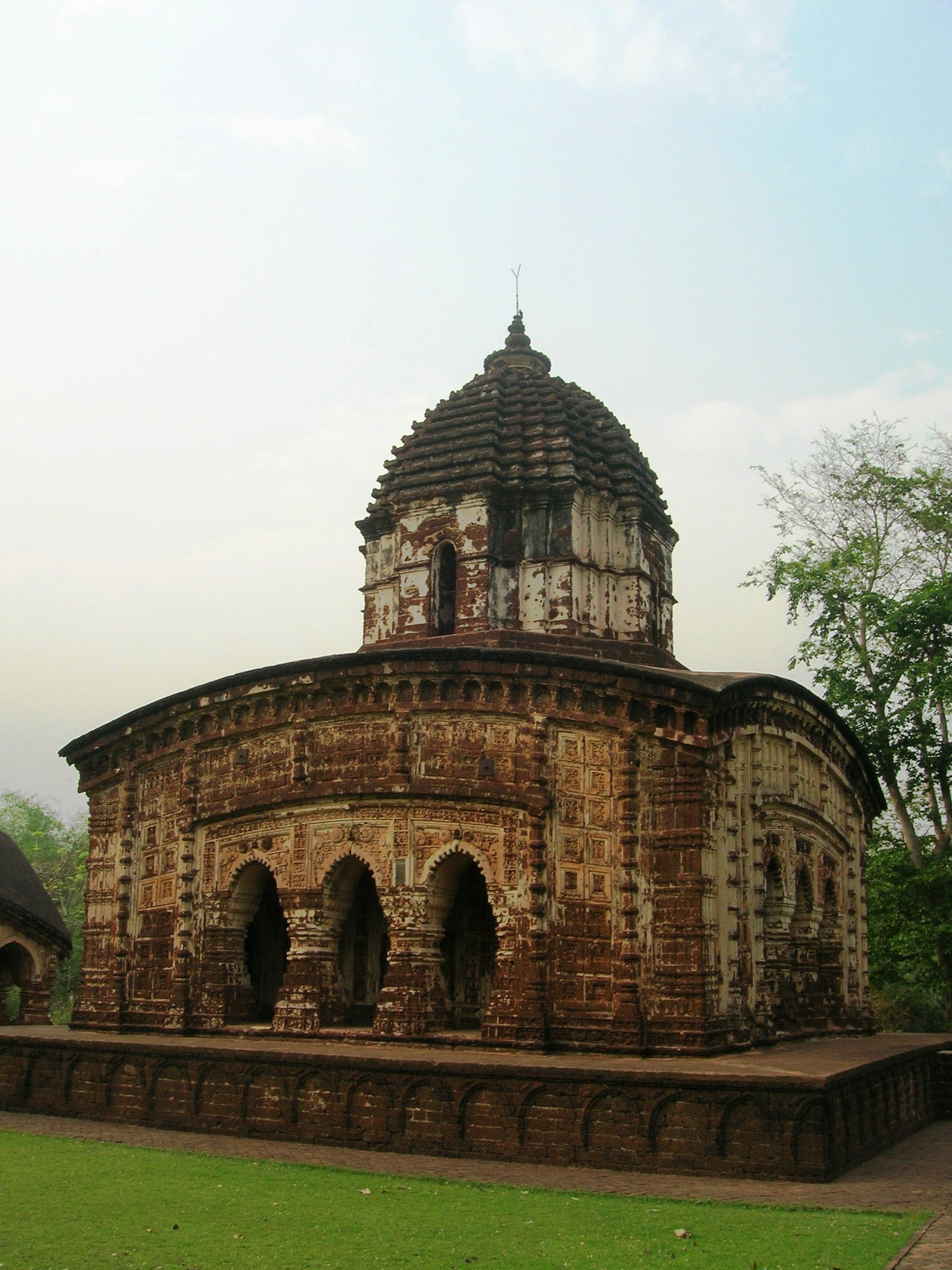
Radhamadhab Temple (1737 CE)

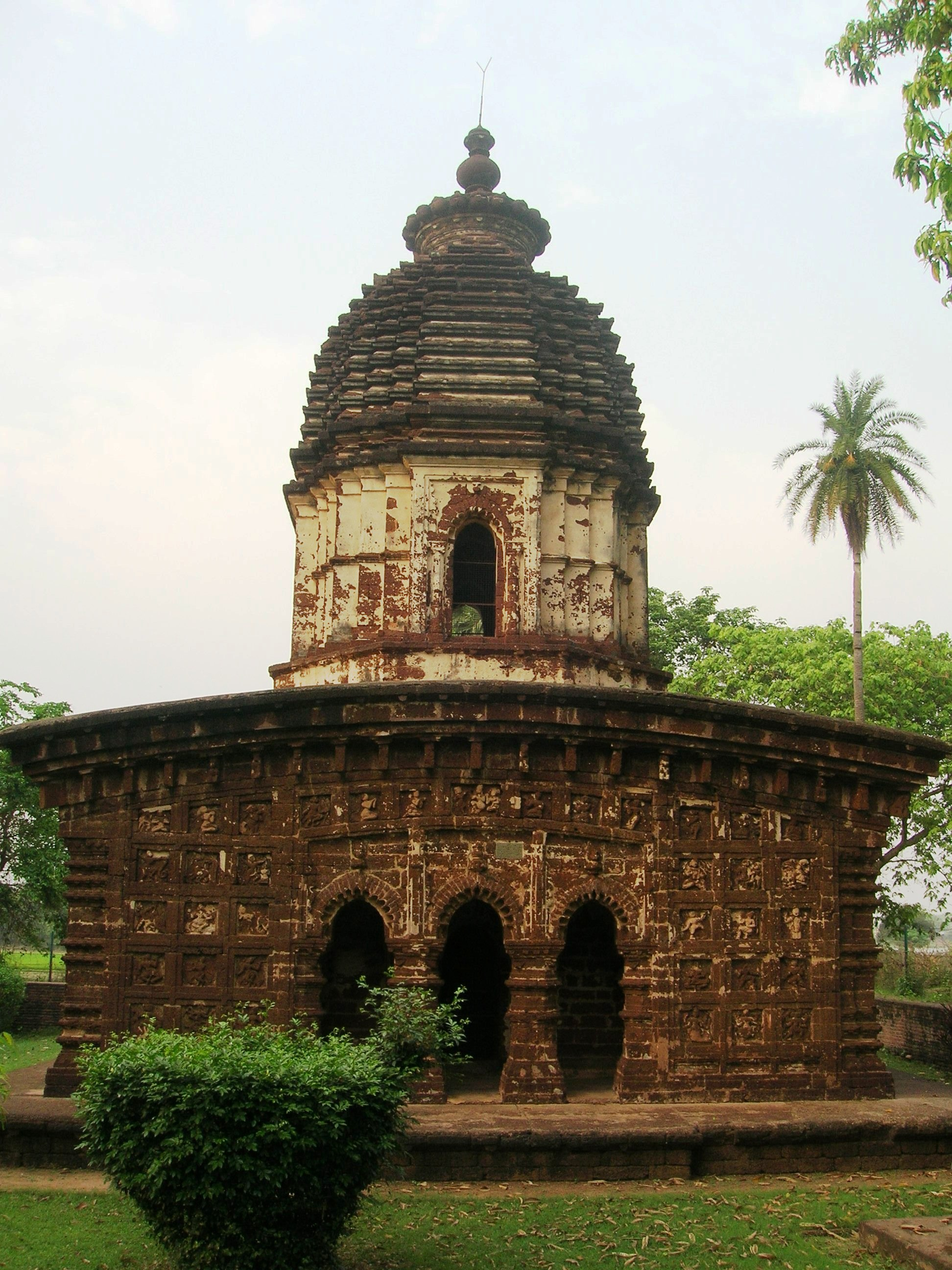
Kalachand Temple (1656 CE)

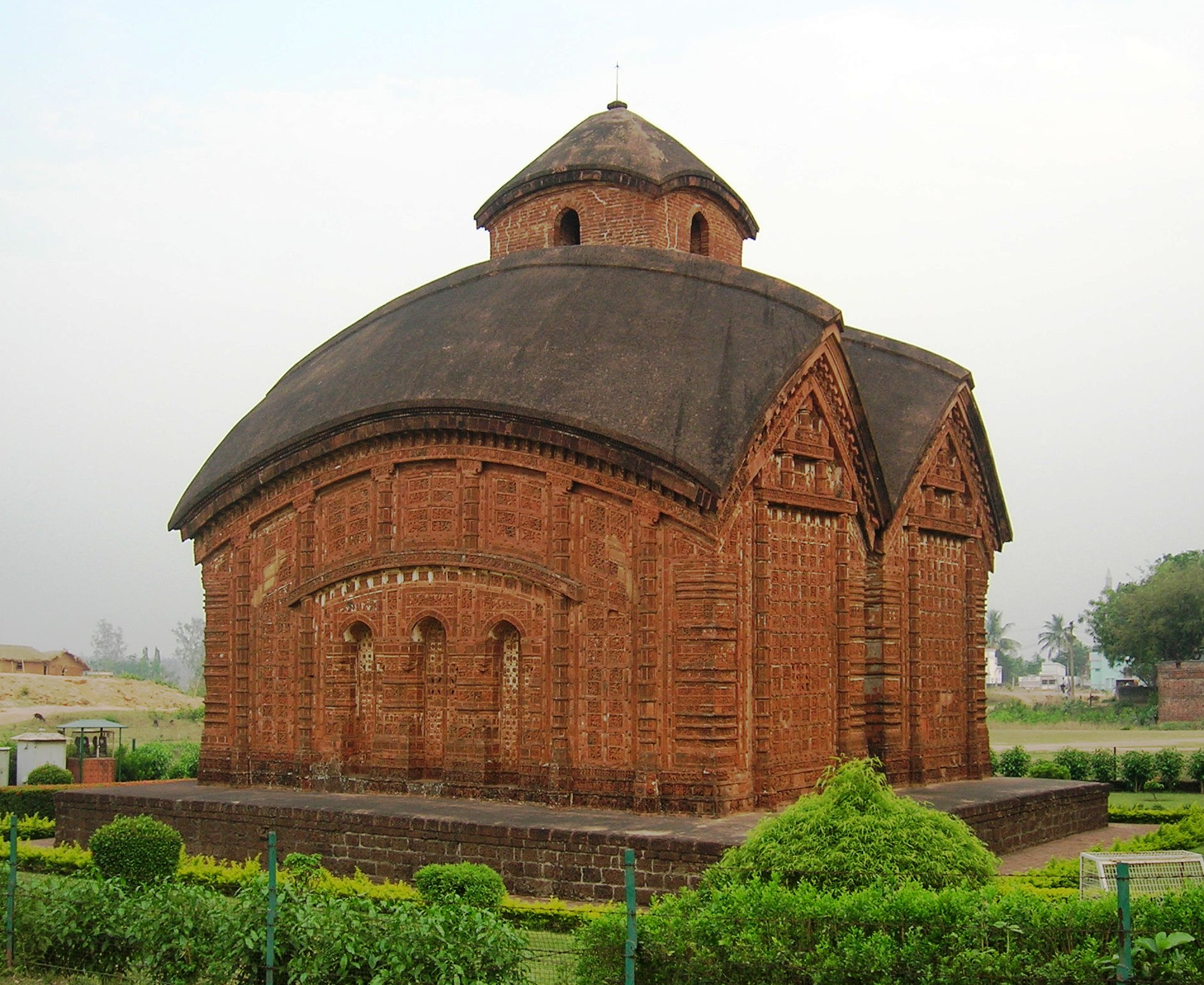
Jor-Bangla Temple or Keshta Roy Temple (1655 CE)

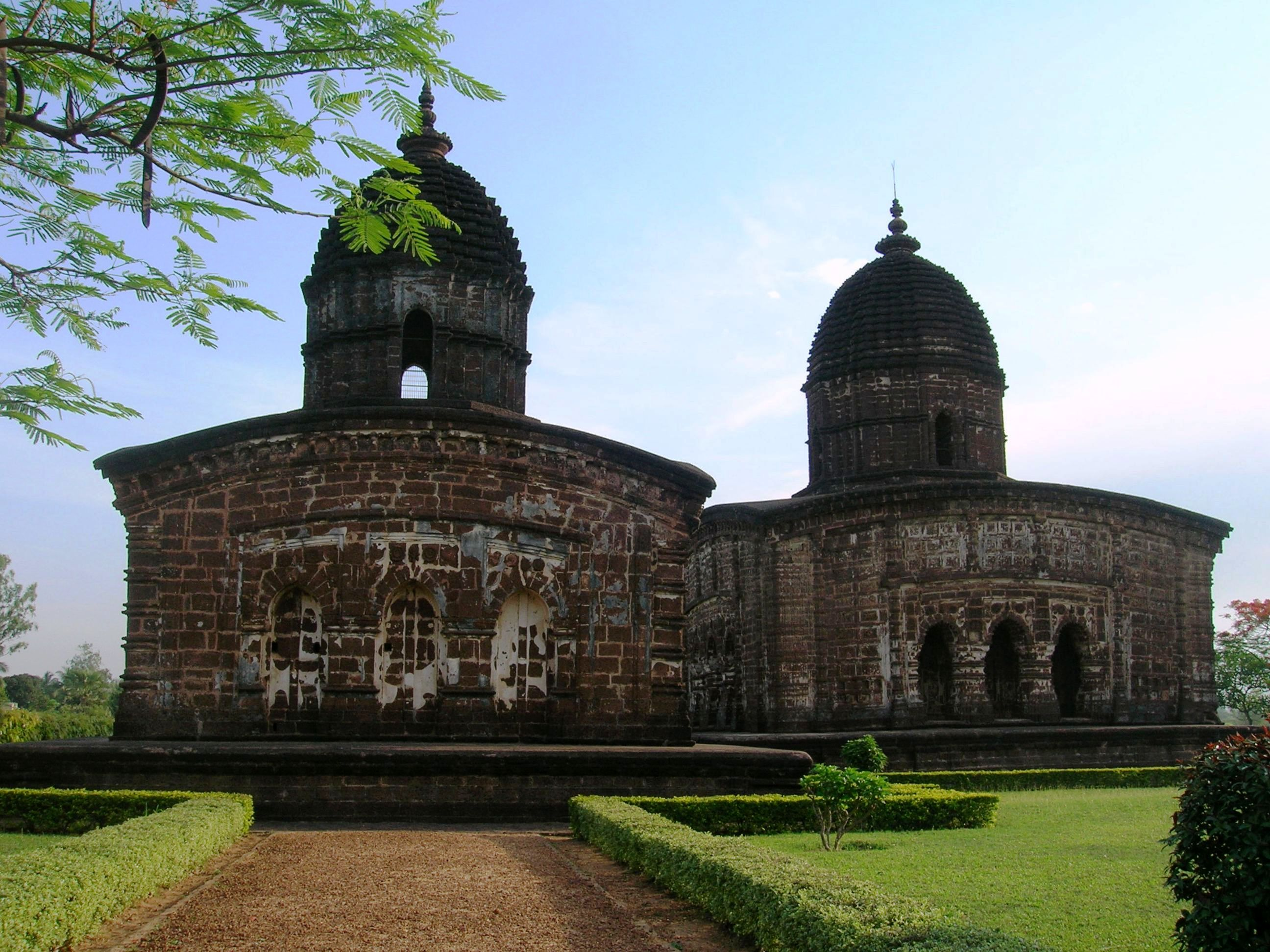
Jor Mandir complex (1726 CE)

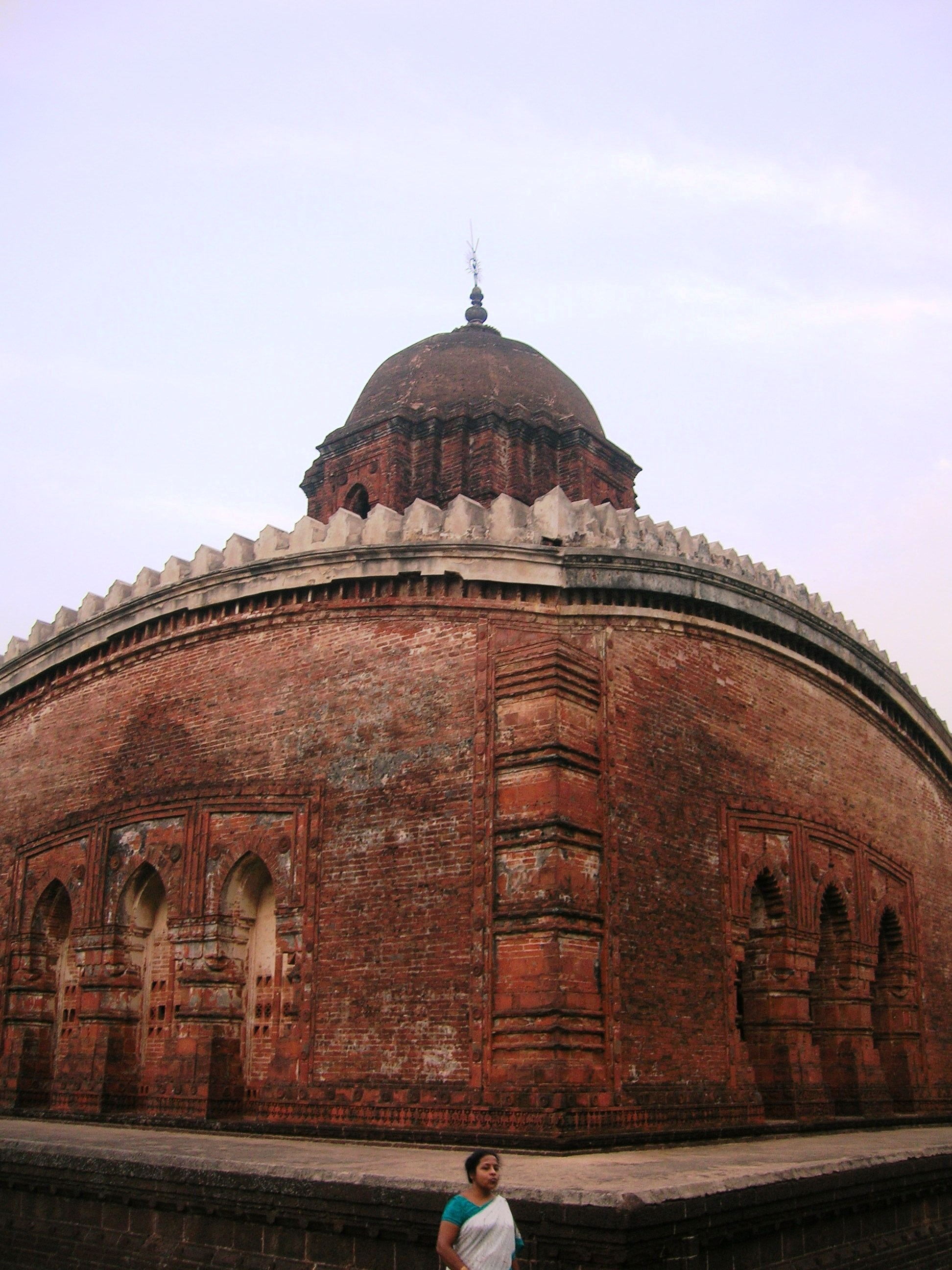
Madan Mohan Temple (1694 CE)

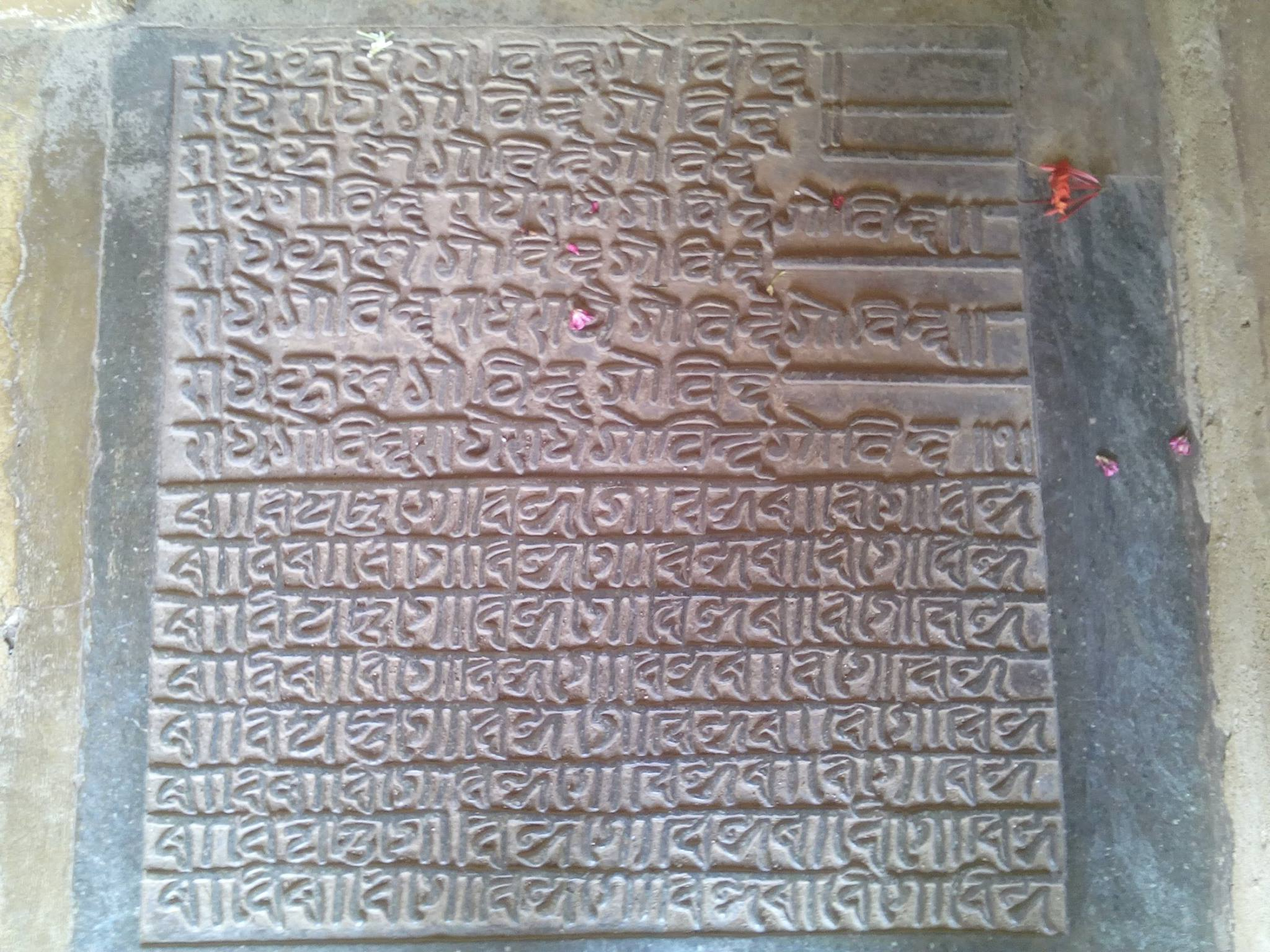
Inscription on Radha Shyam Temple (1728 CE)

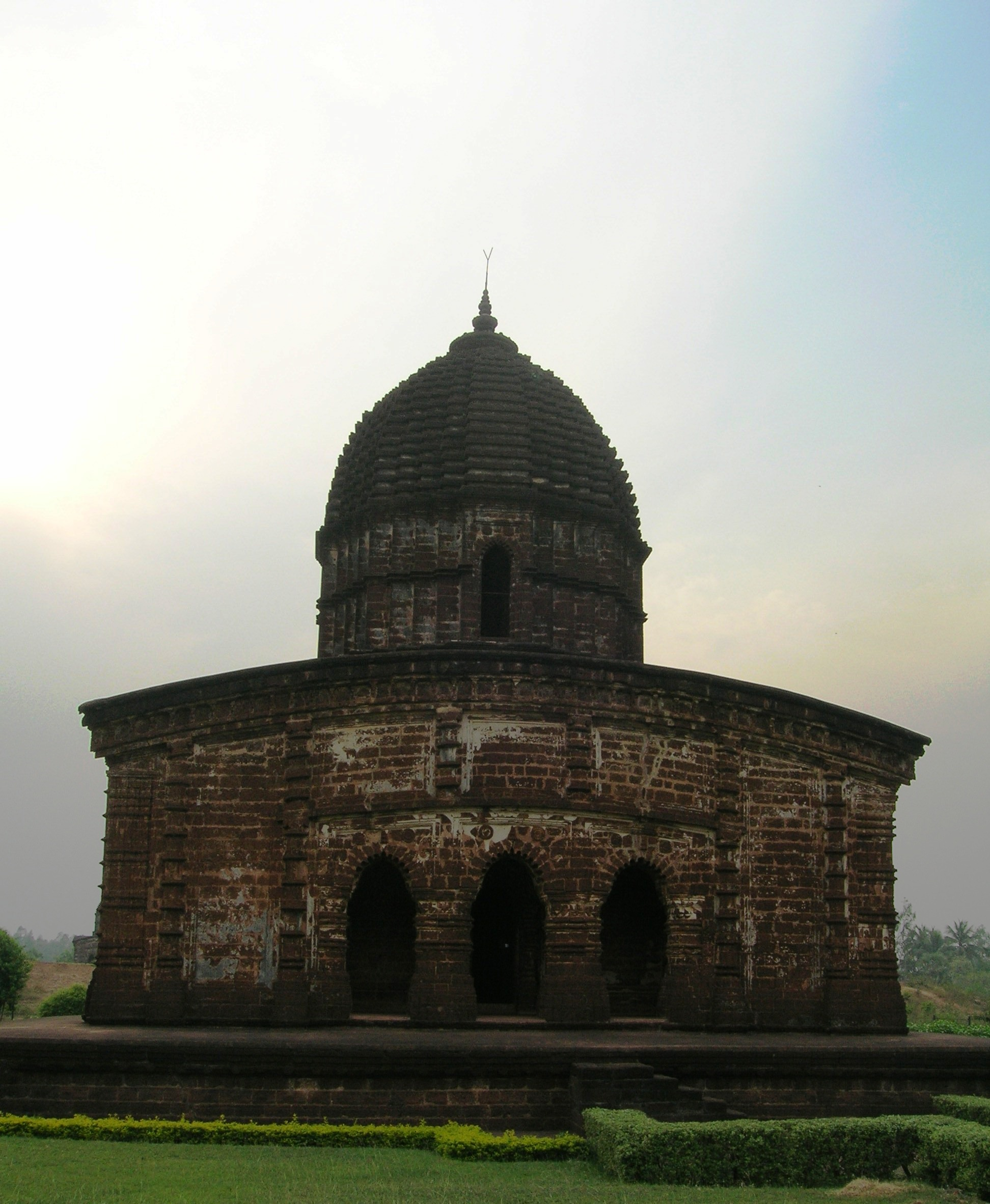
Radha-Gobinda Temple (1729 CE)

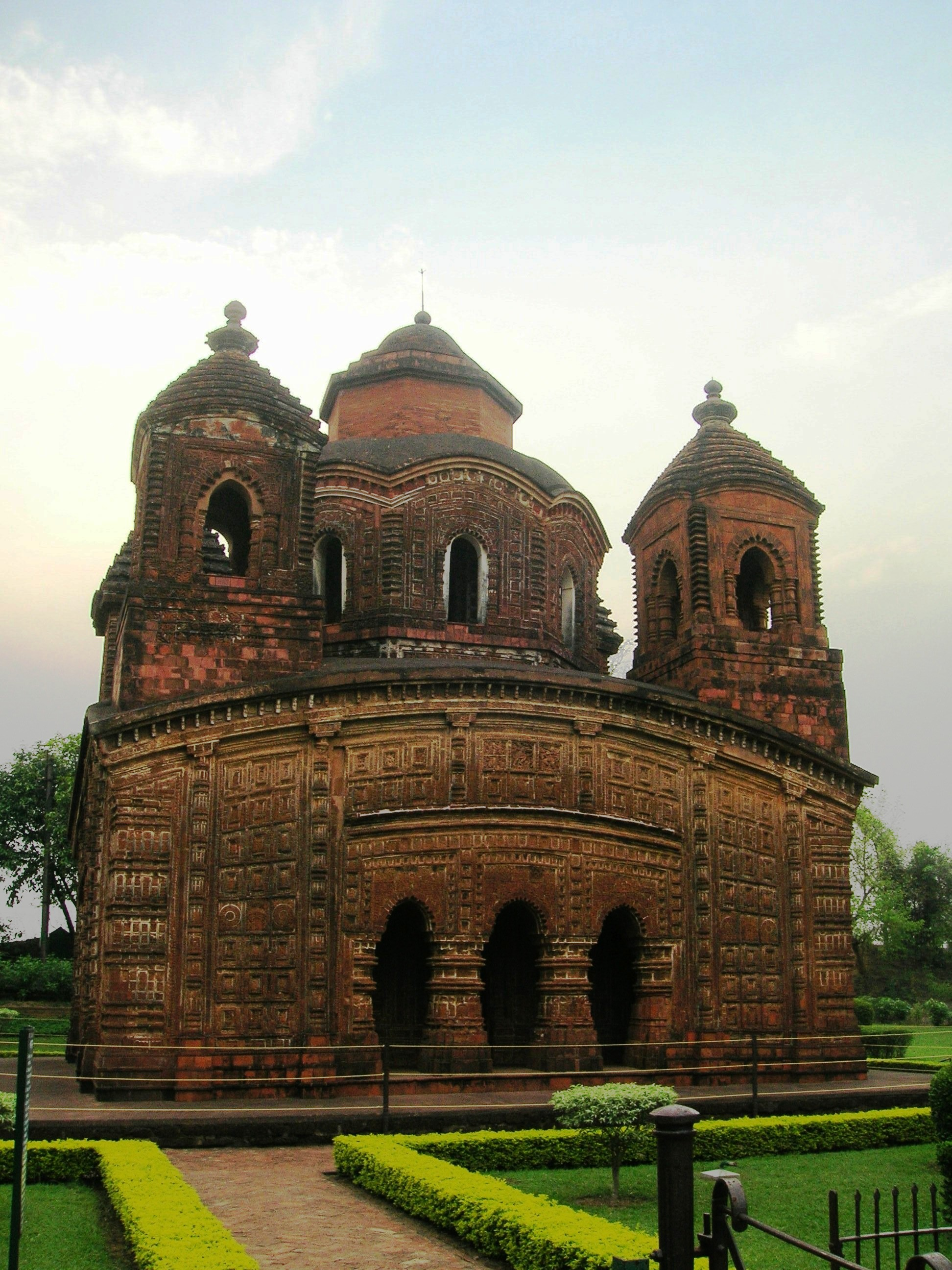
Shyam Ray Temple (1643 CE)

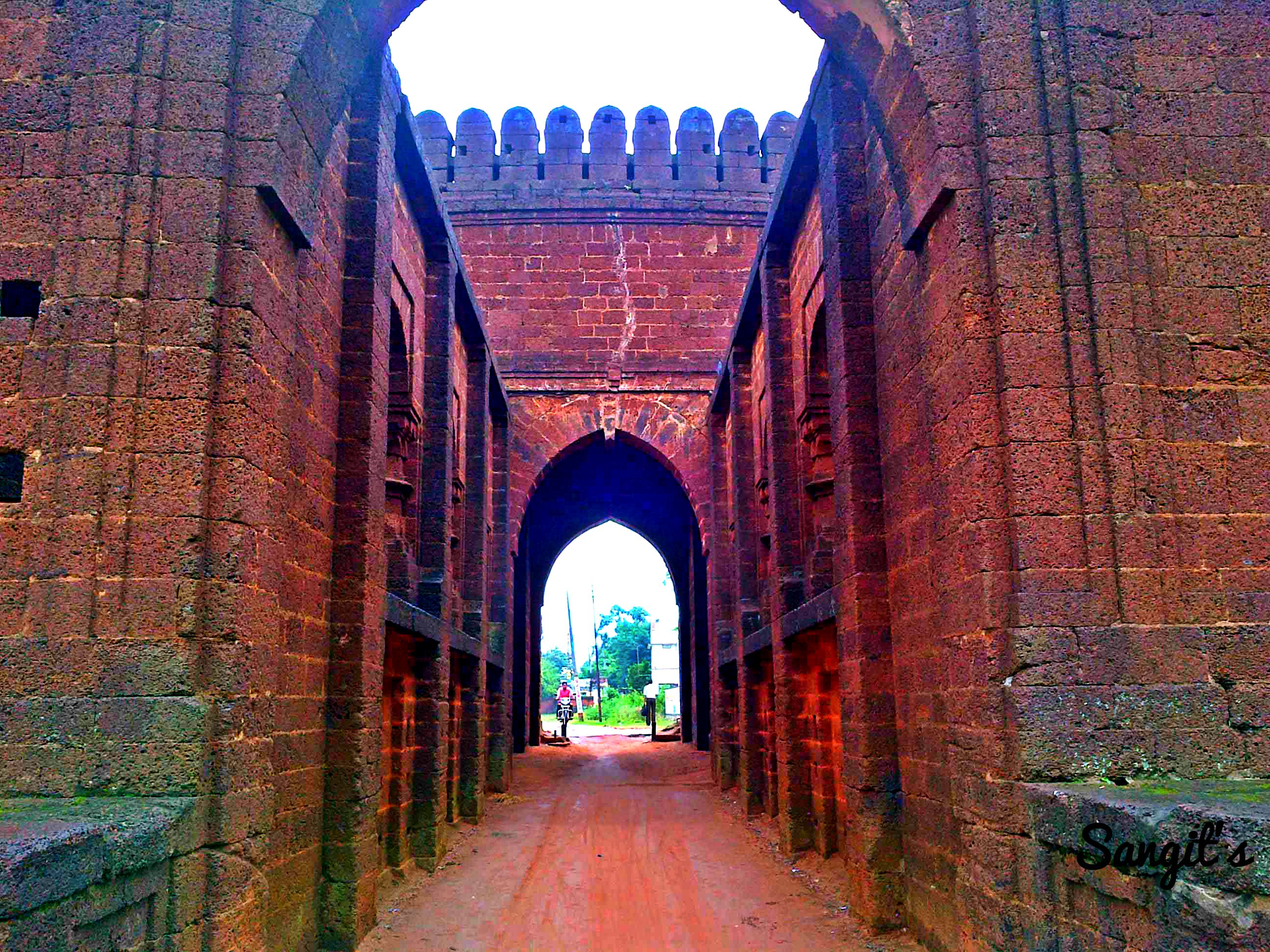
Bishnpur fort gate

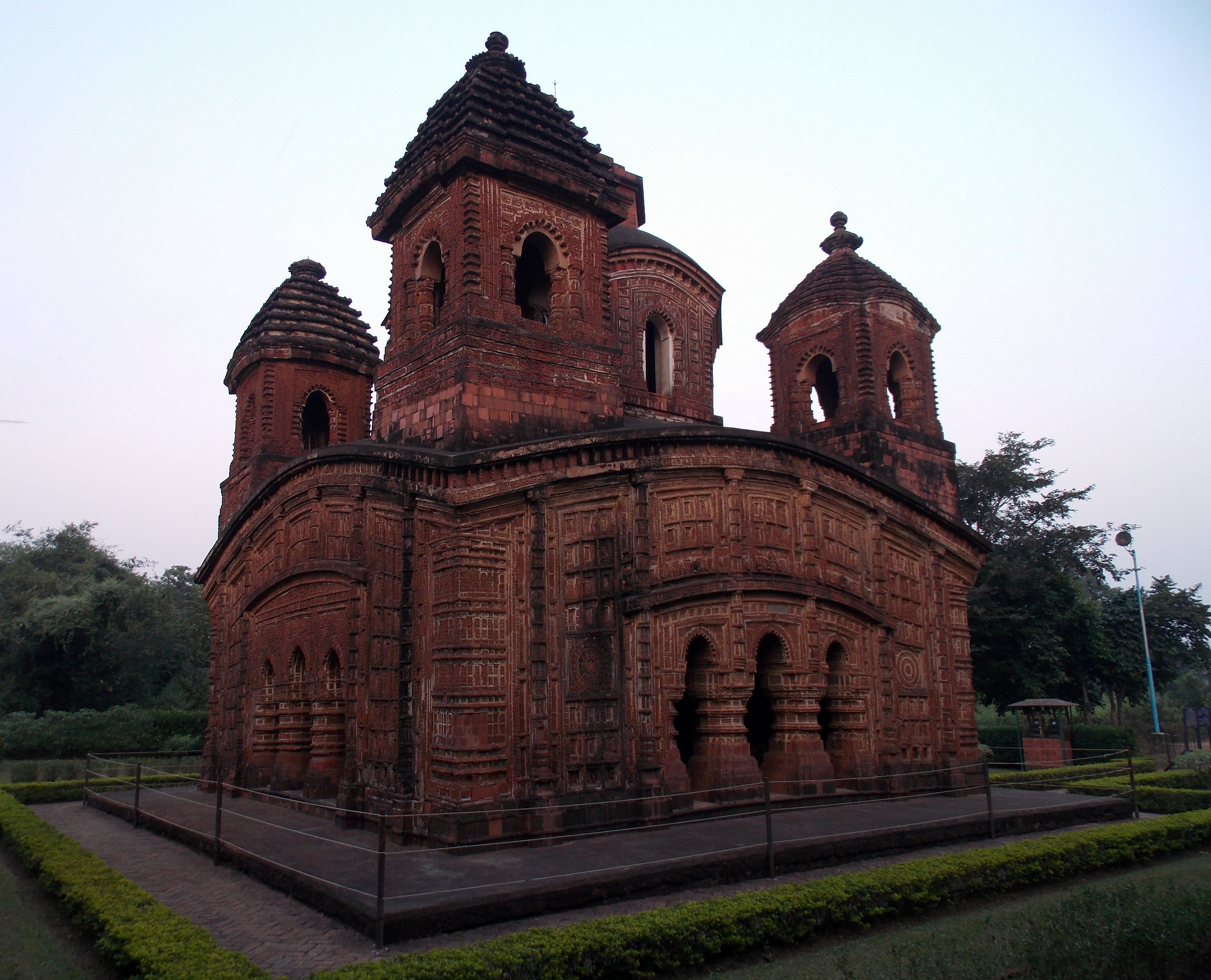
Panchchura temple

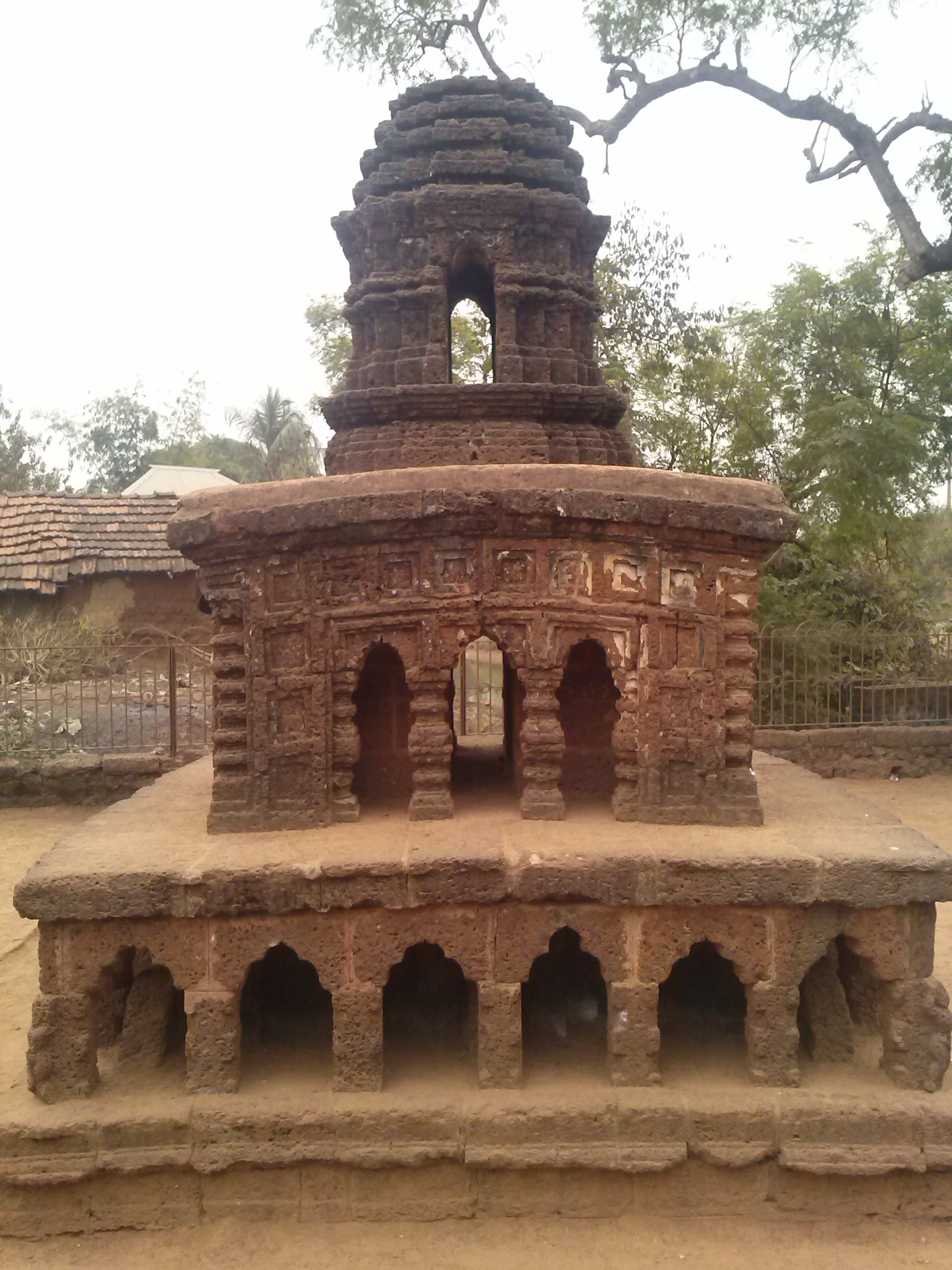
Stone chariot of Bishnupur

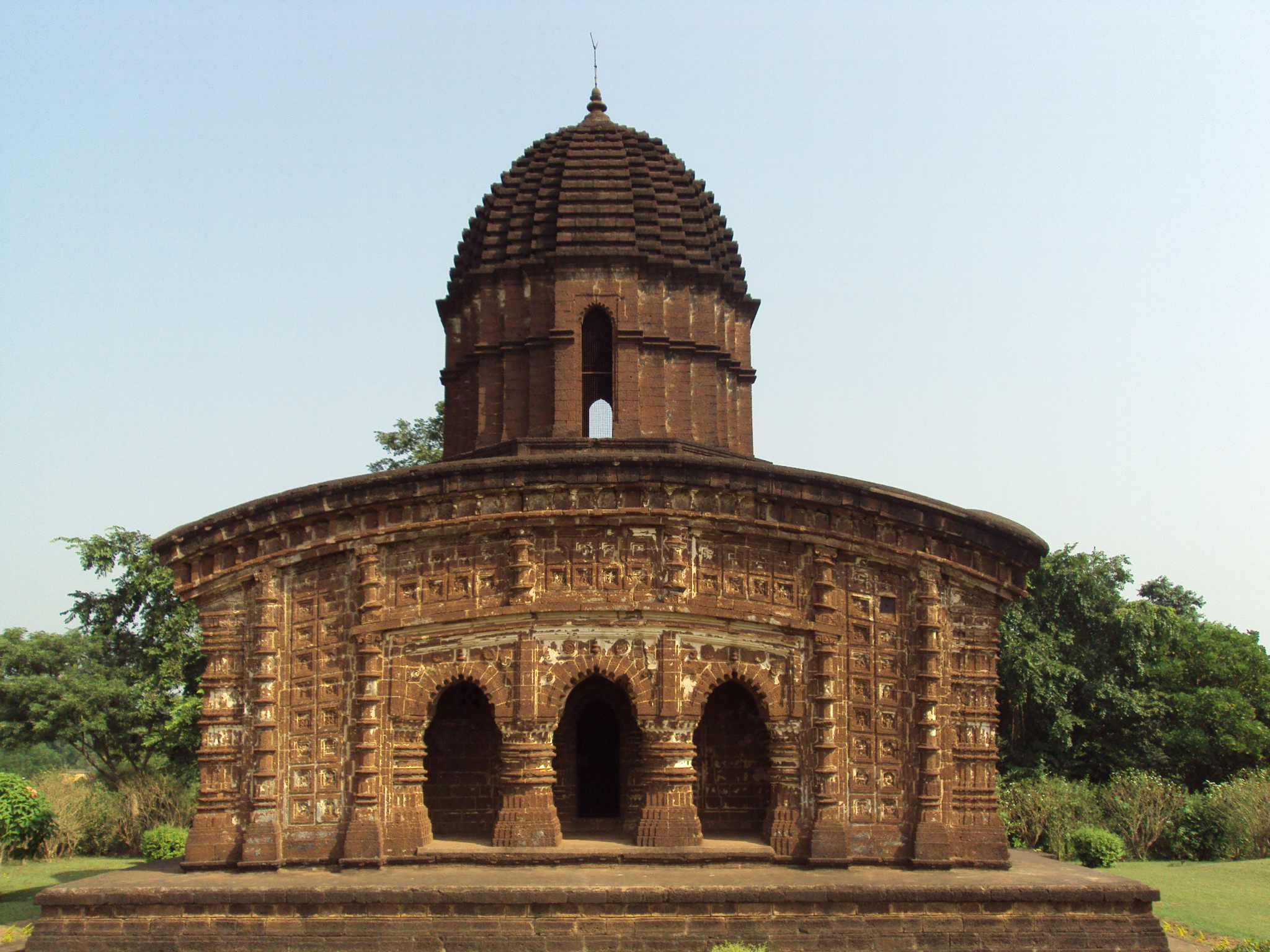
Nandalal Temple

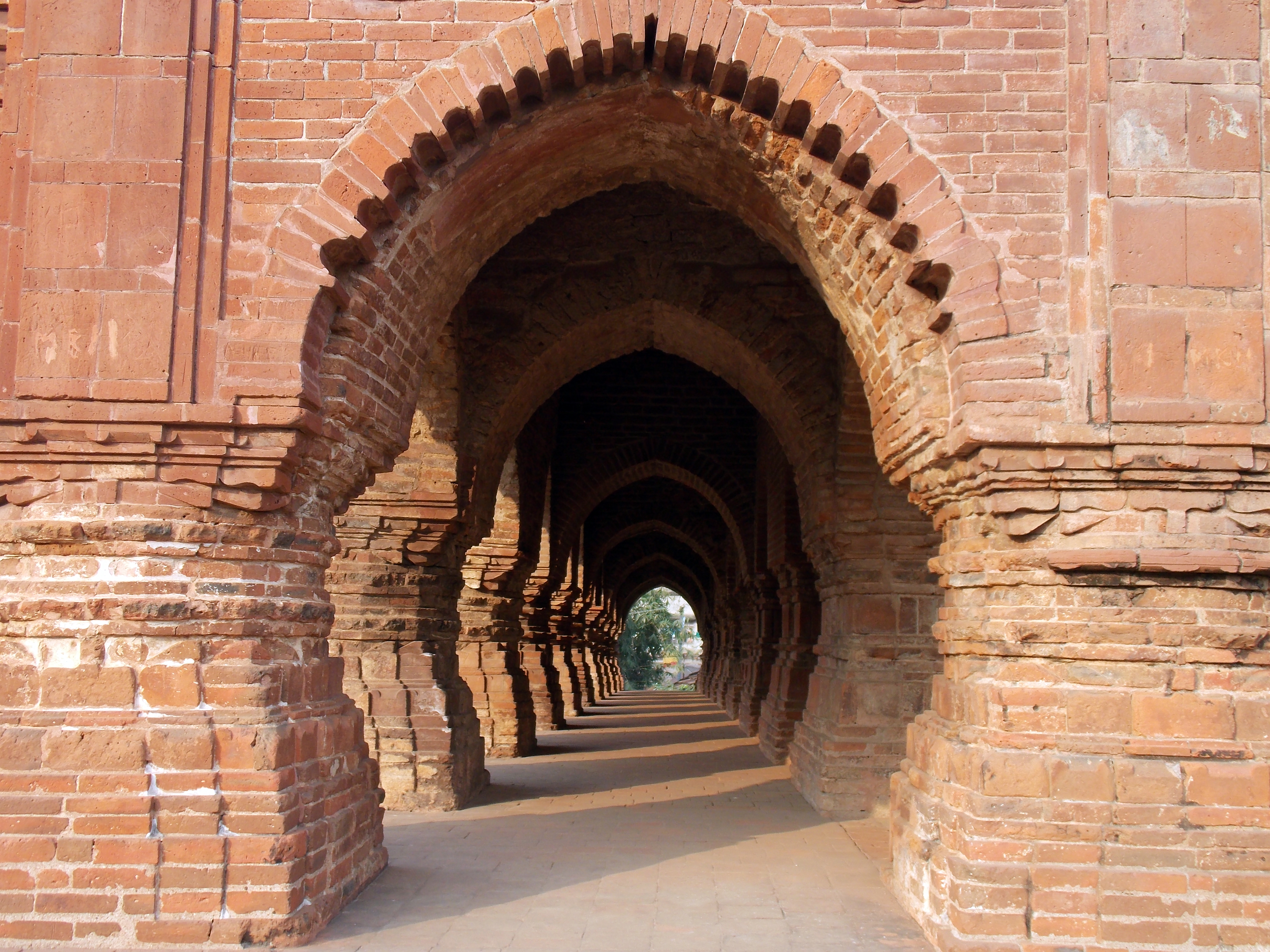
Rashmancha (gate)

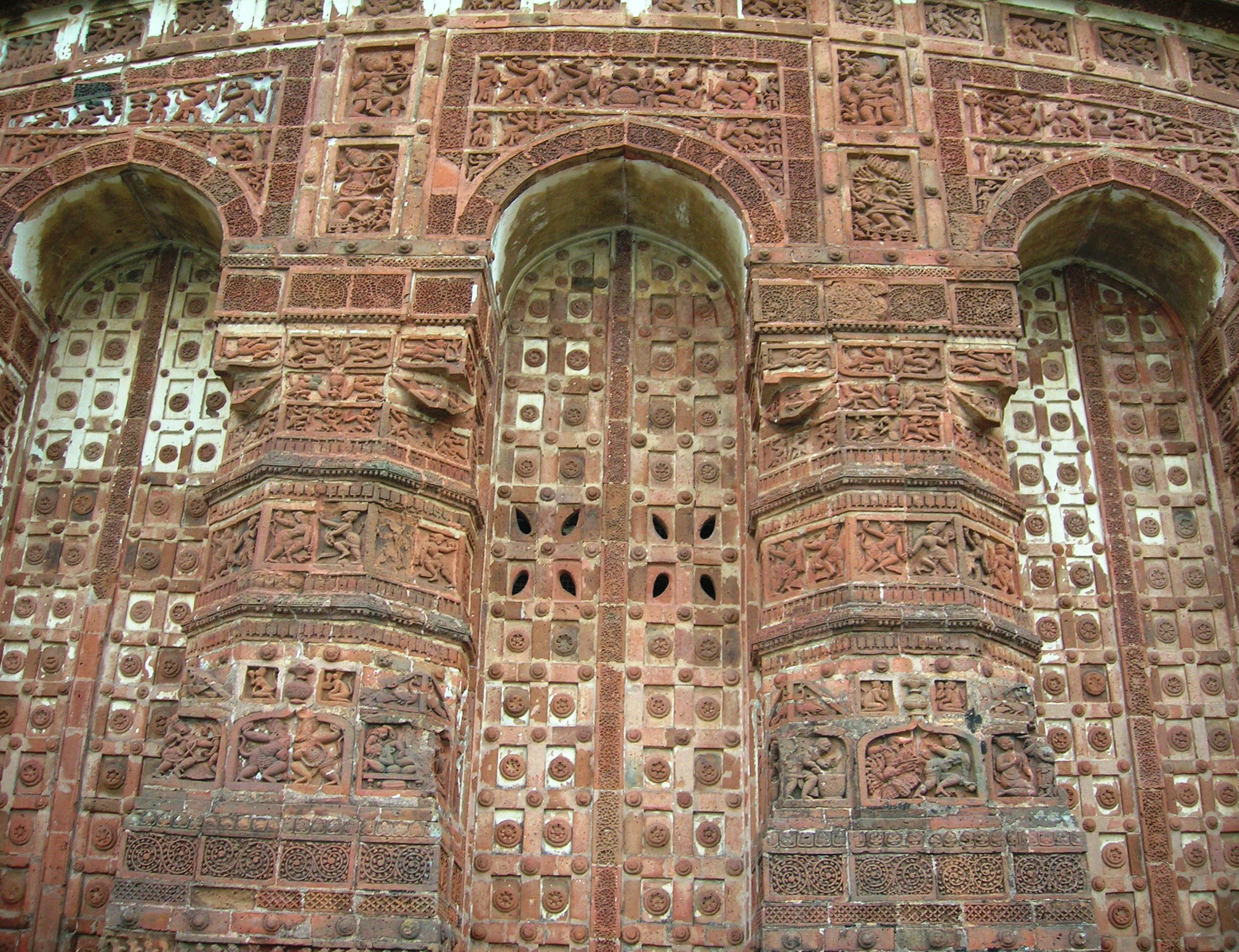
Jor Bangla Temple (arches)

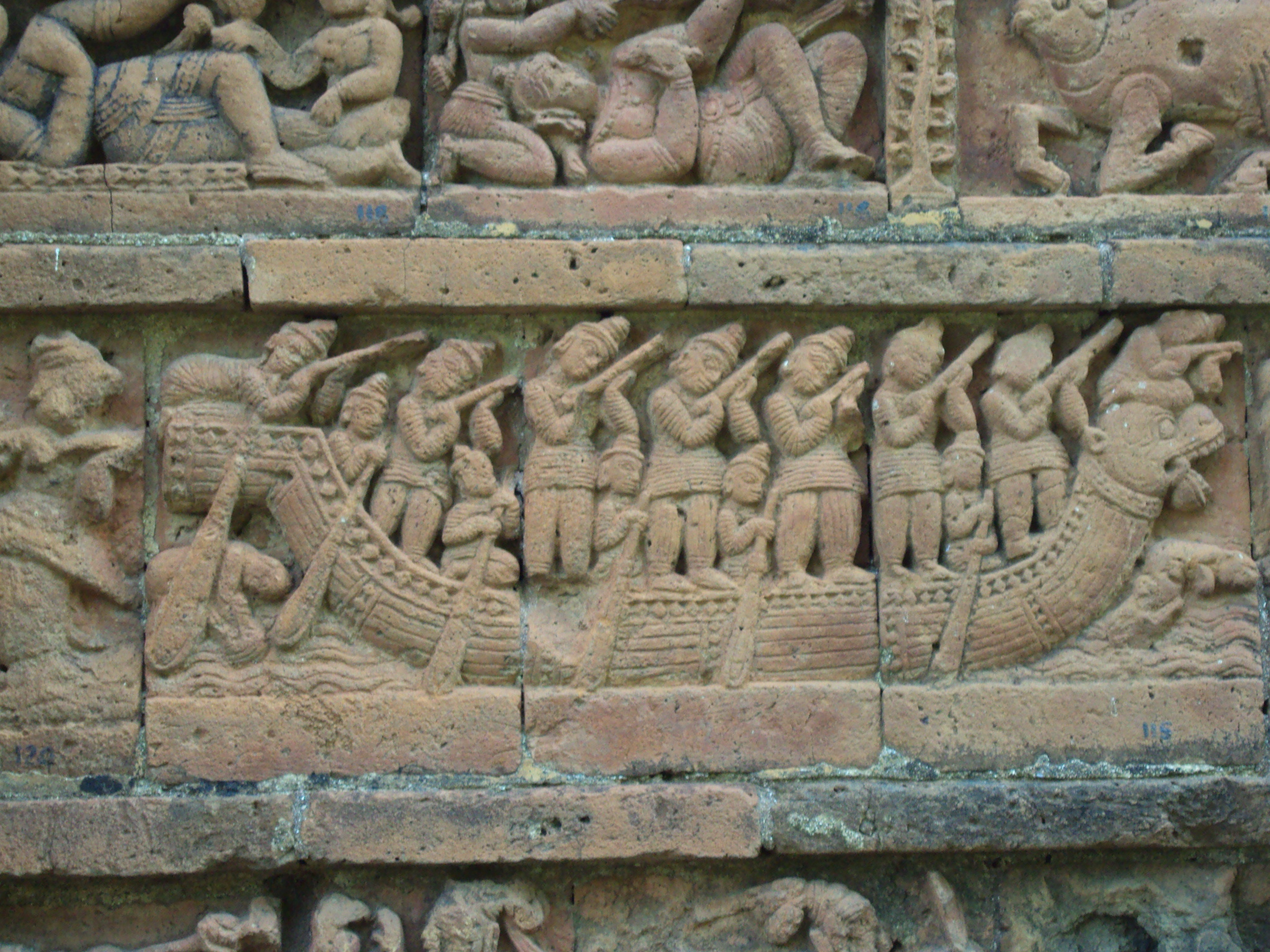
Jor Bangla temple (Terracotta work)

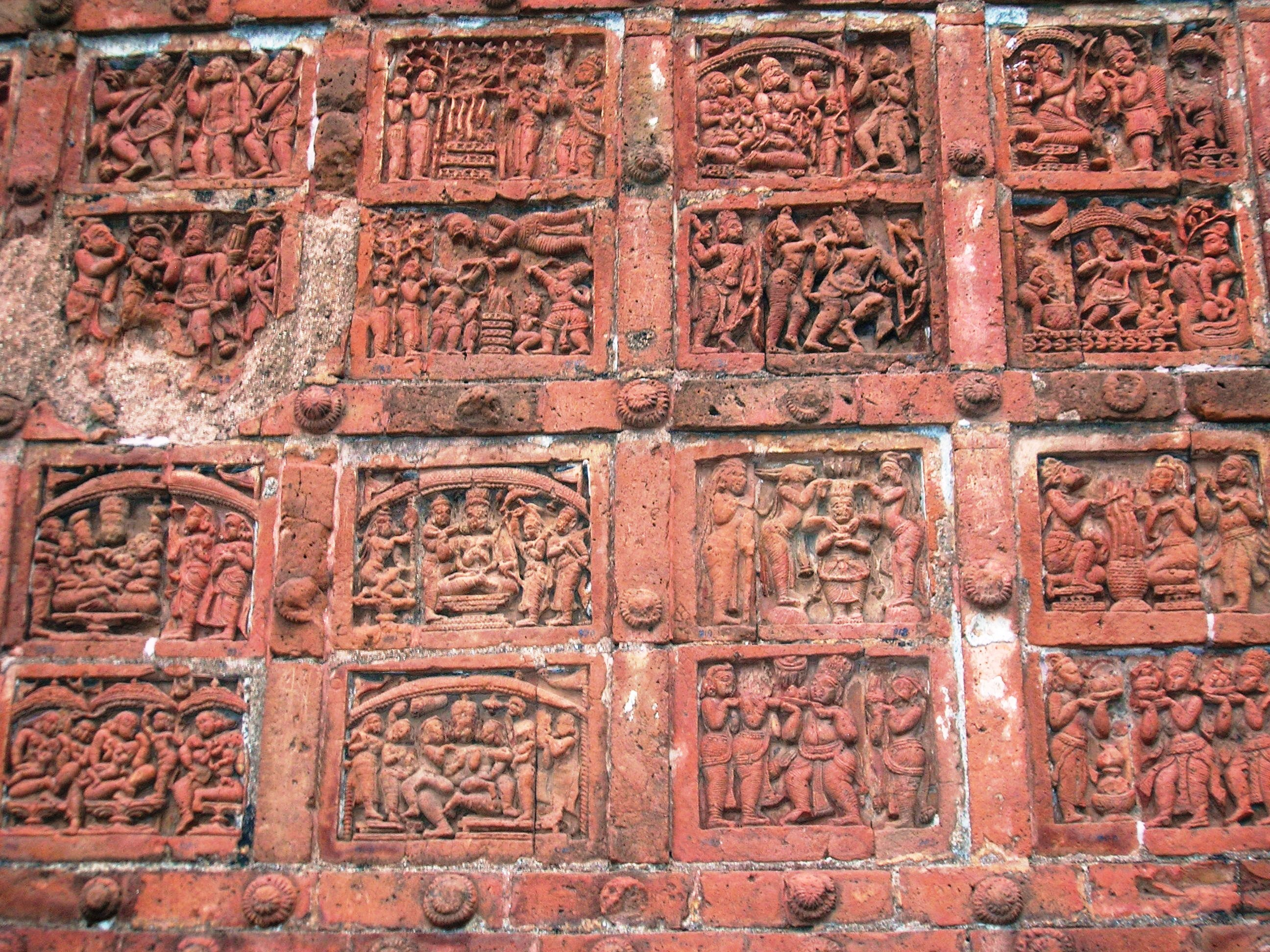
Jor Bangla Temple (Ramayana motifs)

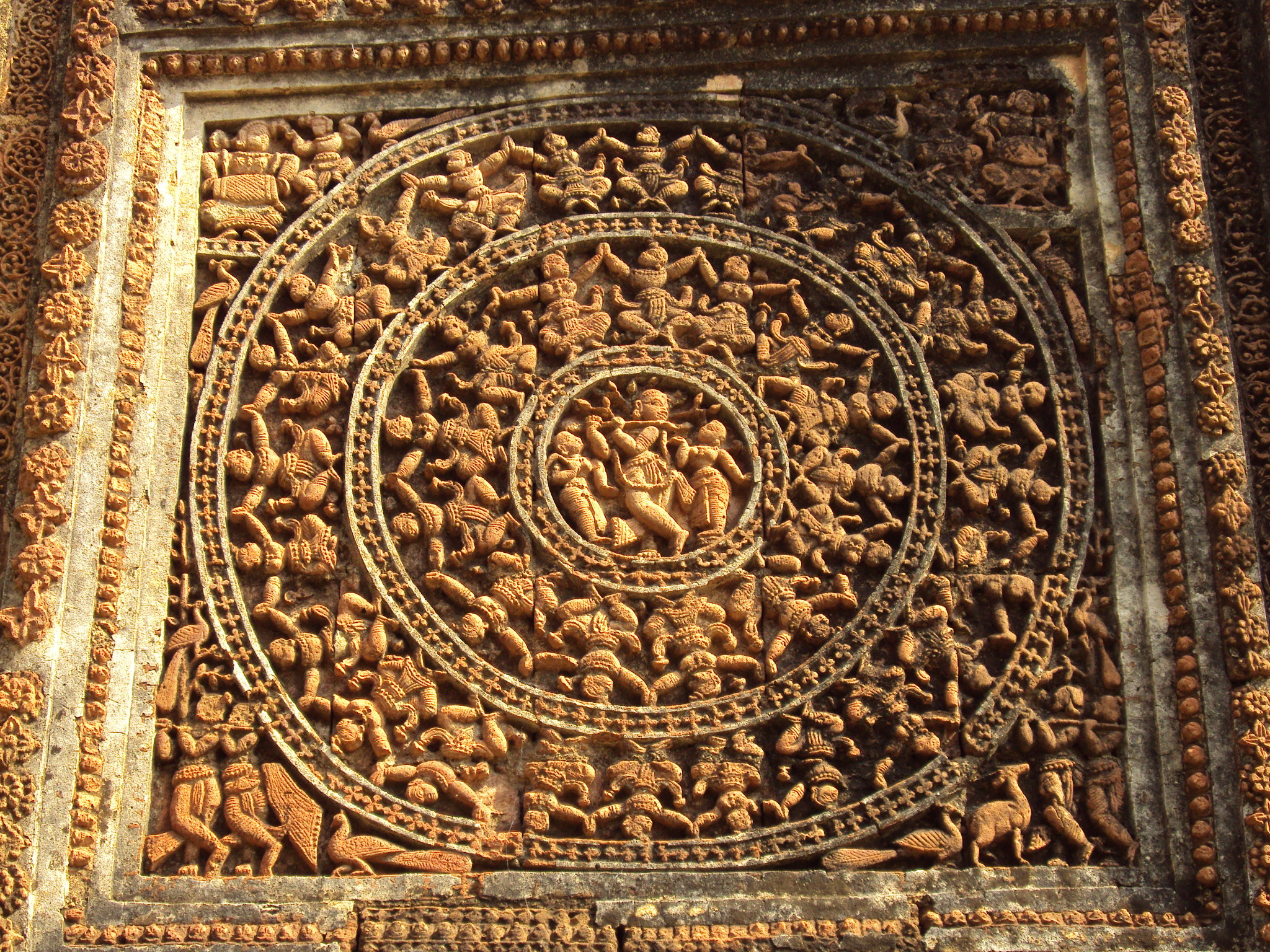
Shyamrai Temple (RasChakra)(Terracotta work)

== See also ==
- Bir Hambir
- Bishnupur
- Raghunath Singha Dev
- History of Bankura district
- History of Bengal
- Jungle Mahals
- List of rulers of Bengal

Related to Bishnupur

- Bishnupur gharana
- Dashavatari Ganjifa
- Baluchari sari

== Sources ==
- Dasgupta, Samira; Biswas, Rabiranjan; Mallik, Gautam Kumar (2009), Heritage Tourism: An Anthropological Journey to Bishnupur, Mittal Publications, ISBN 978-81-8324-294-3
- Biswas, S. S. (1992). Bishnupur (University of Illinois at Urbana-Champaign ed.). Director General, Archaeological Survey of India.
- Das, Binod Sankar (1984). Changing Profile of the Frontier Bengal, 1751-1833. Mittal Publications.
