= Kalipada Singha Thakur =

Raja Kalipada Singha Thakur
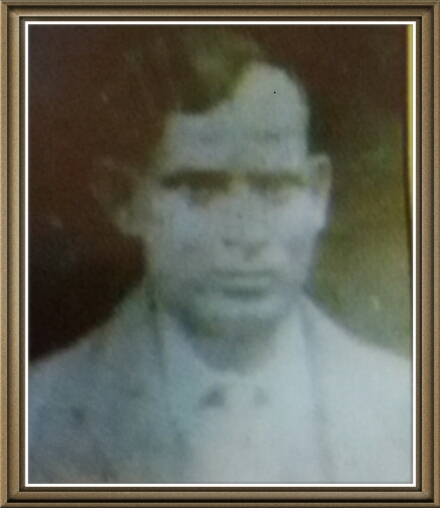
- Raja Kalipada Singha Thakur

King of the Mallabhum
- Reign: 1930 – 1983 CE.
- Coronation: Bishnupur
- Predecessor: Nilmoni Singha Dev
- Born: Purakonda, Bankura
- Died: 29 December 1983; Durgapur, Burdwan.
- Issue: 1. Debendra Bijoy Singha Thakur; 2. Anil Kumar Singha Thakur 3.Sunil Kumar Singha Thakur; 4.Salil Kumar Singha Thakur
- Father: Kumar Ananda Ballav Singha Thakur
- Mother: Indu Kumari Devi
- Religion: Hinduism

Kalipada Singha Thakur was the last King of Malla dynasty of Bishnupur. He became King of Mallabhum in the year 1930 C.E.

== History ==
There are at least three different opinions about Kalipada Singha Thakur. First opinion Prasannyamoyee another queen of Ramkrishna Singha Dev. had a daughter named Indumati, who was married with Anandaballav Singha Thakur. They had a son named Kalipada. After the queen Dwhajamoni died, Prasannyamoyee called kalipada and he was enthroned on the throne of the Mallabhum. In this way the throne was transferred from Singha Dev to Singha Thakurs. Kalipada became king in 1933. Second opinion kalipada Singha Thakur the grandson (from daughter's side) of Ramkishor Singha Dev(Hikim saheb) the second son of Gopal Singha Dev II was enthroned. In another third opinion kalipada Singha Thakur was the daughter's son of prasannya moyee devi - the second wife of Nilmoni Singha Dev.

== Personal life ==
Raja Kalipada Singha Thakur had two wives, first one Rani Shovana Sundori Devi, had two daughters, died at their early ages. Second wife was Rani Siromoni Subornomoyee Patta Mahadevi had four sons and three daughters. Sons are, Devendra Bijoy, Anil Kumar, Sunil Kumar and Salil Kumar.

== Legacy ==
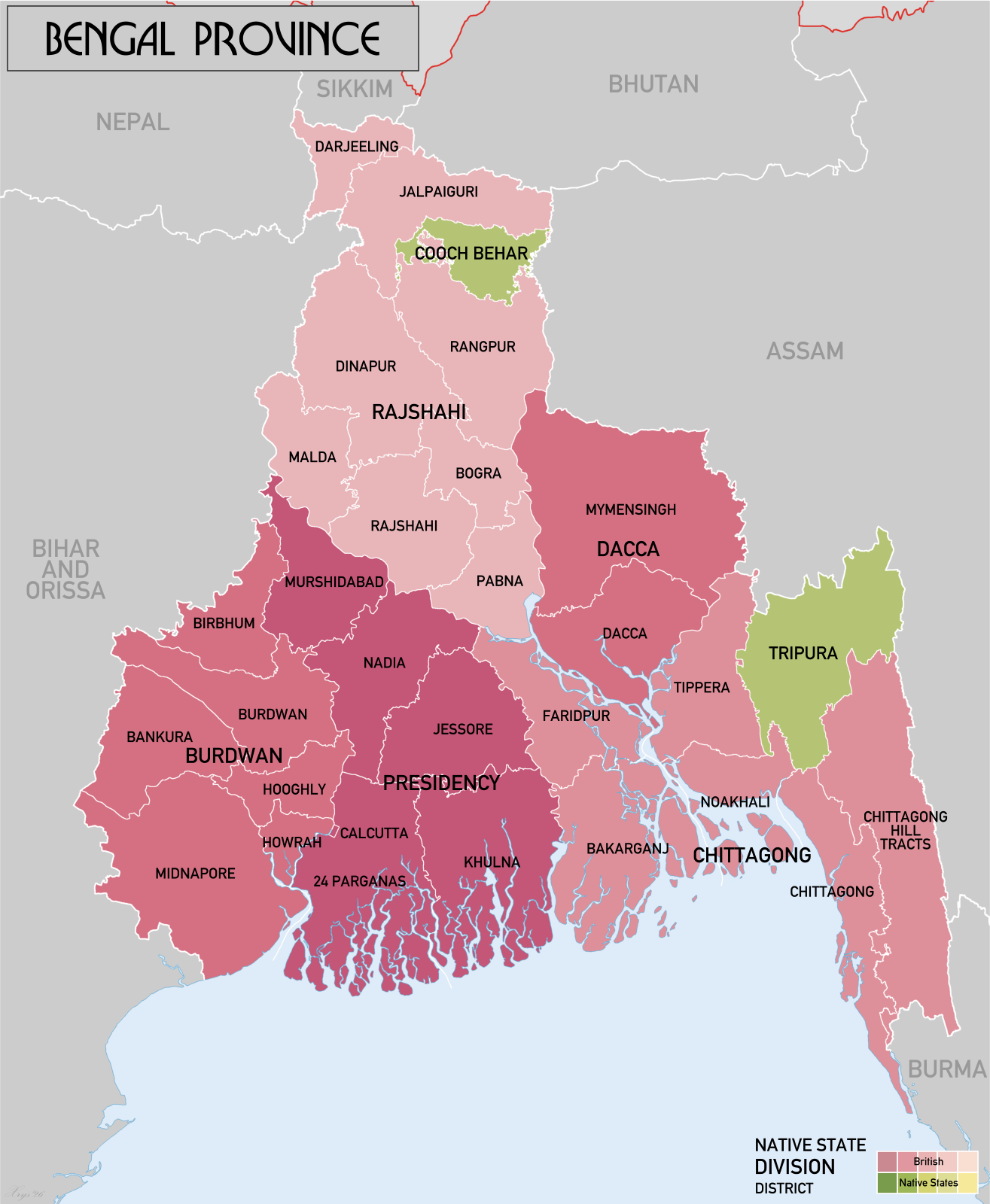
Burdwan Raj in 1931.

Raja Kalipada Singha Thakur was the last titular Raja of Bishnupur Raj. During his time, the estate of Bishnupur was reduced to a small Zamindari. While the geographical extent of Bishnupur had shrunk from its days when it was a kingdom, Thakur tried to maintain the glamour and aristocratic nature of his holdings. In 1942, he ignored the verdict of the District Magistrate (India) and performed the ritual firing of canon during Mahashtthami day of Durga Puja.In 1969, he contested the legislative assembly elections in West Bengal, standing from Bishnupur, Bankura Assembly constituency. He stood as a candidate of the Bharatiya Jana Sangh, later re-formed as the Bharatiya Janata Party. He was defeated by the candidate of Bangla Congress. During his lifetime, most of the temples of Bishnupur was acquired by the Archaeological Survey of India(ASI). He died on 29 December 1983.

== Sources ==
- Dasgupta, Gautam Kumar; Biswas, Samira; Mallik, Rabiranjan (2009), Heritage Tourism: An Anthropological Journey to Bishnupur, A Mittal Publication, p. 21, ISBN 978-8183242943
- Chandra, Manoranjan (2002). "Mallabhum Bishnupur". Digital Library of India (Barcode 99999990343523) (in Bengali). Kolkata. Deys Publishing. Archived from the original on 29 January 2016.
