= Ramkrishna Singha Dev =

59th king of the Mallabhum
- Reign: 1876–1885
- Predecessor: Gopal Singha Dev II
- Successor: Dwhaja Moni Devi
- Religion: Hinduism

Ramkrishna Singha Dev was the fifty-ninth king of the Mallabhum. He ruled from 1876 to 1885 CE.

== History ==
=== Personal life ===
Ramkrishna Singha Dev was a very benevolent king and was pleasing all his subjects. He had no son and in 1885 he died. His Queen Dwhaja Moni Devi ruled from 1885 to 1888. Then in 1889 Queen Dwhaja Moni Devi enthroned Nilmoni Singha Dev the descendant of Chaitanya Singha Dev second son Nimai Singha.

== See also ==
- Anantalal Banerjee was court musician in of Ramkrishna Singha Dev of Bishnupur kingdom.

== Sources ==
- Dasgupta, Gautam Kumar; Biswas, Samira; Mallik, Rabiranjan (2009), Heritage Tourism: An Anthropological Journey to Bishnupur, A Mittal Publication, p. 20, ISBN 978-8183242943
