= Madhav Singha Dev =

57th king of the Mallabhum
- Reign: 1801–1809 CE.
- Predecessor: Chaitanya Singha Dev
- Successor: Gopal Singha Dev II
- Religion: Hinduism

Madhav Singha Dev(also known as Madhab Singha Deba and Madhava Singh) was the fifty-seventh king of Mallabhum. He ruled from 1801 to 1809 CE.

== History ==
In 1801, the kingdom was officially downgraded to a Zamindari, or a landholding, under the rule of King Madhab Singha Deba.

=== Revolt ===
In 1800, Madhav Singha led a widespread uprising in Medinipur, challenging British rule. The British faced significant resistance before quelling the rebellion. Discontent with his stipend from the East India Company, Singha attempted to raid the Bankura treasury, but his efforts failed. During his rule, the Ghatowal Mahal was auctioned off, further fueling unrest. Captured and imprisoned, Singha died in jail, marking the end of his resistance.

=== Ghatwali system ===
According to the Regulation XVIII of 1805, a magistrate was assigned to the Jungle Mahals, bringing areas like Pachet mahal, Bagmuntdi mahal, and other mahals under the new jurisdiction. After the 1810 revolt led by Baijnath Singh of Dampara, which prompted the deployment of military forces, the Ghatwali system in Jaibalea, Bishnupur, was dismantled. In its place, new police stations were established across various estates, and the daroga police system was reinstated.

== Sources ==
- Dasgupta, Gautam Kumar; Biswas, Samira; Mallik, Rabiranjan (2009), Heritage Tourism: An Anthropological Journey to Bishnupur, A Mittal Publication, ISBN 978-8183242943
- Steemers, Koen (2000), Architecture, City, Environment: Proceedings of PLEA 2000 : July 2000 ..., James & James (Science Publishers) Ltd, ISBN 1902916166
