= Yadav Malla =

Raja of Mallabhum from 906 to 919

14th Raja of Mallabhum
- Reign: 906–919
- Predecessor: Durjan Malla
- Successor: Jagannath Malla
- Religion: Hinduism

Yadav Malla, also known as Jadava Malla, was the fourteenth king of the Mallabhum. He ruled from 906 to 919.
