= Bir Malla =

Raja of Mallabhum from 1501 to 1554

47th king of the Mallabhum
- Reign: 1501–1554 CE.
- Predecessor: Chandra Malla
- Successor: Dhari Malla
- Religion: Hinduism

Bir Malla, also known as Bira Malla, was the forty-seventh king of the Mallabhum. He ruled from 1501 to 1554 CE.

== Sources ==
- Dasgupta, Gautam Kumar; Biswas, Samira; Mallik, Rabiranjan (2009), Heritage Tourism: An Anthropological Journey to Bishnupur, A Mittal Publication, p. 20, ISBN 978-8183242943
