= Shur Malla =

Raja of Mallabhum from 775 to 795

8th Raja of Mallabhum
- Reign: 775–795
- Predecessor: Dha Malla
- Successor: Kanak Malla
- Religion: Hinduism

Shur Malla also known as Sura Malla was the eighth king of the Mallabhum, ruling from 775 to 795.

== Reign ==
Shur Malla conquered the Bagri area of Mednipur and incorporated it into the Mallabhum kingdom.

== Sources ==
- Dasgupta, Gautam Kumar; Biswas, Samira; Mallik, Rabiranjan (2009), Heritage Tourism: An Anthropological Journey to Bishnupur, A Mittal Publication, ISBN 978-8183242943
