= Madan Malla =

Raja of Mallabhum from 1407 to 1420

43rd king of the Mallabhum
- Reign: 1407–1420 CE.
- Predecessor: Shiv Singh Malla
- Successor: Durjan Malla II
- Religion: Hinduism

Madan Malla was the forty-third king of the Mallabhum, ruling from 1407 to 1420 CE.

== History ==
Madan Malla established of the idol of Madan Mohan and extended Mallabhum up to Raipur.

== Sources ==
- Dasgupta, Gautam Kumar; Biswas, Samira; Mallik, Rabiranjan (2009), Heritage Tourism: An Anthropological Journey to Bishnupur, A Mittal Publication, ISBN 978-8183242943
