= Prakash Malla =

Raja of Mallabhum from 1097 to 1102

26th Raja of Mallabhum
- Reign: 1097–1102
- Predecessor: Rup Malla
- Successor: Dha Malla
- Religion: Hinduism

Jay Prakash Malla was the 26th king of the Mallabhum, ruling from 1097 to 1102.

== Reign ==
Prakash Malla established a village at the north east corner of the Dwarakeswar River and also established the Prakash ghat business center.

== Sources ==
- Dasgupta, Gautam Kumar; Biswas, Samira; Mallik, Rabiranjan (2009), Heritage Tourism: An Anthropological Journey to Bishnupur, A Mittal Publication, ISBN 978-8183242943
