= Bhim Malla =

Raja of Mallabhum from 1240 to 1253

35th king of the Mallabhum
- Reign: 1240–1253 CE.
- Predecessor: Gobinda Malla
- Successor: Katar Malla
- Religion: Hinduism

Bhim Malla was the thirty-fifth king of the Mallabhum. He ruled from 1240 to 1253 CE.

== History ==
Bhim Malla established the idol of the deity Shyam Chand. Extended the boundary of Mallabhum up to the Damodar River in the north.

== Sources ==
- Dasgupta, Gautam Kumar; Biswas, Samira; Mallik, Rabiranjan (2009), Heritage Tourism: An Anthropological Journey to Bishnupur, A Mittal Publication, ISBN 978-8183242943
