= Ram Malla =

Raja of Mallabhum from 1185 to 1209

33rd king of the Mallabhum
- Reign: 1185–1209 CE.
- Predecessor: Jiban Malla
- Successor: Gobinda Malla
- Religion: Hinduism

Ram Malla, also known as Kshetra, was the thirty-third king of Mallabhum. He ruled from 1185 to 1209 CE.

== History ==
Ram Malla strengthened the military power of his state.

== Sources ==
- Dasgupta, Gautam Kumar; Biswas, Samira; Mallik, Rabiranjan (2009), Heritage Tourism: An Anthropological Journey to Bishnupur, A Mittal Publication, ISBN 978-8183242943
