= Kanu Malla =

Raja of Mallabhum from 757 to 764

6th king of the Mallabhum
- Reign: 757–764 CE.
- Predecessor: Indra Malla
- Successor: Dha Malla
- Issue: Dha Malla
- Father: Indra Malla
- Religion: Hinduism

Kanu Malla, also known as Kau Malla and Kalu Malla, was the sixth king of the Mallabhum. He ruled from 757 to 764 CE.

== History ==
Kanu Malla Defeated the Kakatiya King of the Kakatiya State(Presently Patrasayar) and extended the boundary of Mallabhum.

== Sources ==
- Dasgupta, Gautam Kumar; Biswas, Samira; Mallik, Rabiranjan (2009), Heritage Tourism: An Anthropological Journey to Bishnupur, A Mittal Publication, ISBN 978-8183242943
