= Kharga Malla =

Raja of Mallabhum from 841 to 862

Raja of Mallabhum
- Reign: 841–862
- Predecessor: Sanatan Malla
- Successor: Durjan Malla
- Religion: Hinduism

Kharga Malla was the twelfth king of the Mallabhum. He ruled from 841 to 862 AD.

== History ==
Kharga Malla's name was lent to the city of Kharagpur after his army conquered it.

== Sources ==
- Dasgupta, Gautam Kumar; Biswas, Samira; Mallik, Rabiranjan (2009), Heritage Tourism: An Anthropological Journey to Bishnupur, A Mittal Publication, ISBN 978-8183242943
- Mallik, Abhaya Pada (1921). History of Bishnupur-Raj: An Ancient Kingdom of West Bengal (the University of Michigan ed.). Calcutta. p. 12.
