= Chandra Malla =

Raja of Mallabhum from 1460 to 1501

46th king of the Mallabhum
- Reign: 1460–1501 CE.
- Predecessor: Uday Malla
- Successor: Bir Malla
- Religion: Hinduism

Chandra Malla was the forty-sixth king of the Mallabhum. He ruled from 1460 to 1501 CE.

== History ==
Chandra Malla establishment of Gokulnagar village and the idol of Gokul Chand and Shri at the place 12 miles away from Bishnupur at its eastern side. During his regime Radha Krishna puja started and Chaitanya Dev took birth in Bengal.

== Sources ==
- Dasgupta, Gautam Kumar; Biswas, Samira; Mallik, Rabiranjan (2009), Heritage Tourism: An Anthropological Journey to Bishnupur, A Mittal Publication, ISBN 978-8183242943
