= Dhari Malla =

Raja of Mallabhum from 1554 to 1565

48th king of the Mallabhum
- Reign: 1554–1565 CE.
- Predecessor: Bir Malla
- Successor: Hambir Malla Dev
- Religion: Hinduism

Dhari Malla was the forty-eight king of the Mallabhum. He ruled from 1554 to 1565 CE.

== History ==
Dhari Malla (1554 CE. to 1565 CE.) the eldest son of Bir Malla was contemporary to the Emperor Akbar at Delhi. it is told that during his regime, Mallabhum was included under the control of the Mughal rule. He was the first Malla king to acknowledge the suzerainty of the emperor and promised to pay a tribute. Akbar for the convenience of his administration divided his kingdom into fifteen divisions or Subahs. Each Subah was under the control of one Najim or Shipahashalar. Bengal, Bihar and Orissa together formed a Subah. The Najim of that Subah imposed tax of rupees one lakh seven thousand coins that is one lakh and eighty thousand rupees to the Malla kingdom. It is told that all the time Dhari Malla used to take back the money tactfully who had to pay as tax. Even then he was very disturbed and had an insulted and unsecured feeling on the Najim's behaviour. Due to the feeling of insecurity, he paid attention on the security of his kingdom. He accumulated numerous firearms, cannon etc.

== Sources ==
- Dasgupta, Gautam Kumar; Biswas, Samira; Mallik, Rabiranjan (2009), Heritage Tourism: An Anthropological Journey to Bishnupur, A Mittal Publication, p. 21, ISBN 978-8183242943
- Das, Binod Sankar (1984), Changing Profile of the Frontier Bengal, 1751-1833, A Mittal Publication, p. 46
- O’Malley, L.S.S., ICS, Bankura, Bengal District Gazetteers, pp. 21-46(25), 1995 reprint, first published 1908, Government of West Bengal
