= Nilmoni Singha Dev =

60th king of the Mallabhum
- Reign: 1889–1903
- Predecessor: Dwhaja Moni Devi
- Successor: Kalipada Singha Thakur
- Issue: Ramchandra Singha Dev
- Father: Nimai Singha Dev 2nd son of Chaitanya Singha Dev
- Religion: Hinduism

Nilmoni Singha Dev was the sixtieth king of the Mallabhum. He ruled from 1889 to 1903.

== History ==
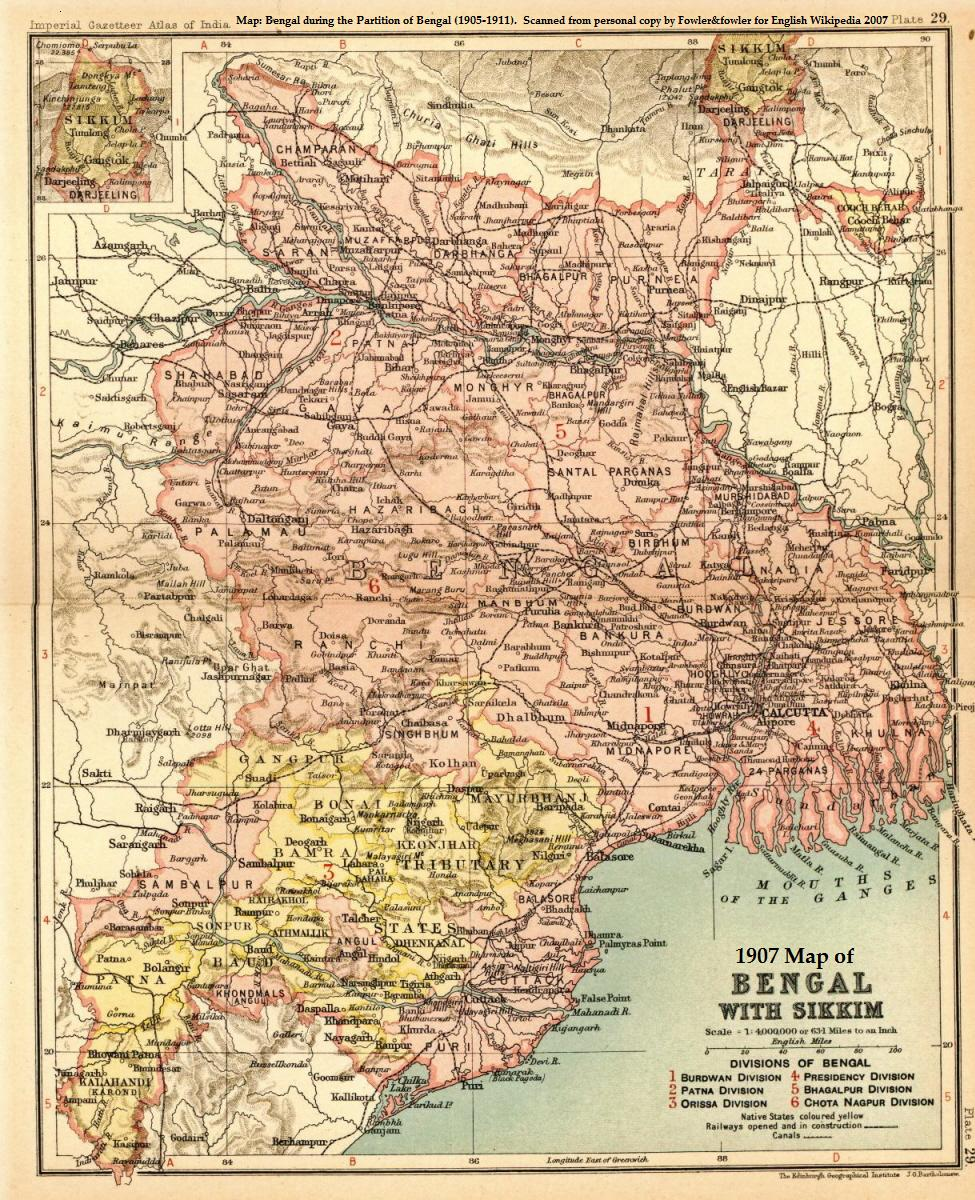
1907 Map of Bengal with Sikkim

=== Personal life ===
Nilmoni Singha Dev was the last king of Singha Dev dynasty. He had two wives, Churamoni and Prasanyamoyee. Nilmoni died in 1904. He got a son by Churamoni who died in his early age. At that time the British rulers strictly banned firing of a cannon. Nilmoni Singha Dev's only son Ramchandra Singha Dev died at 19 years of age in 1903.

=== No king ===
From 1903 to 1932 Mallabhum was without any king. Churamoni Devi used to look after the administration of the state. She was paid Rs. 60 monthly as her allowance. In 1926 the British (who captured it in 1910) auctioned the Bishnupur State.

== Sources ==
- Dasgupta, Gautam Kumar; Biswas, Samira; Mallik, Rabiranjan (2009), Heritage Tourism: An Anthropological Journey to Bishnupur, A Mittal Publication, p. 20, ISBN 978-8183242943
