= Gopal Singha Dev II =

58th king of the Mallabhum
- Reign: 1809–1876
- Predecessor: Madhav Singha Dev
- Successor: Ramkrishna Singha Dev
- Issue: Ramkrishna Singha Dev; Ramkishor Singha Dev(Hikim Saheb)
- Religion: Hinduism

Gopal Singha Dev II was the fifty-eighth king of the Mallabhum. He ruled from 1809 to 1876 CE.

== History ==
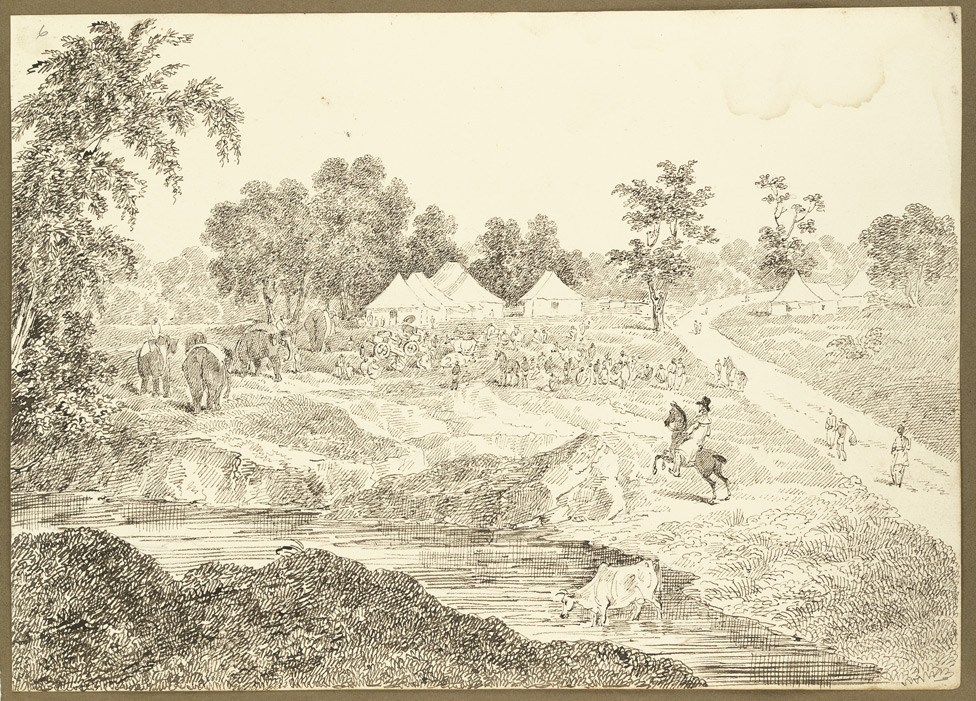
Bishnupur 1823, the capital of the Malla rulers of Bengal, drawing by Charles D'Oyly

Gopal Singha Dev II lived on the stipend given by the East India Company. Bishnupur was constituted a municipality in 1863. His period of rule was 67 years and it was maximum among all the Malla Kings.

== Sources ==
- Dasgupta, Gautam Kumar; Biswas, Samira; Mallik, Rabiranjan (2009), Heritage Tourism: An Anthropological Journey to Bishnupur, A Mittal Publication, p. 20, ISBN 978-8183242943
