= Prithwi Malla =

Raja of Mallabhum from 1295 to 1319

Raja of Mallabhum
- Reign: 1295–1319
- Predecessor: Katar Malla
- Successor: Tapa Malla
- Religion: Hinduism

Prithwi Malla was the king of the Malla dynasty. He ruled from 1295 to 1319.

== History ==
Prithwi Malla is held to be an important socio-political figure for the establishment or, as deduced from their architectural styles, the restoration and reconsecration of the two temples dedicated to Lord Siva. These are Sailesvara and Saresvara temple at the Chalcolithic site of Dihar around 8 kilometres from Bishnupur. Till date these two temples are of special importance not only for the devotees but also for the scholars and tourists.

Sailesvara temple	Saresvara temple	Archaeological Survey of India

== Sources ==
- Dasgupta, Gautam Kumar; Biswas, Samira; Mallik, Rabiranjan (2009), Heritage Tourism: An Anthropological Journey to Bishnupur, A Mittal Publication, p. 20, ISBN 978-8183242943
