= Dinabandhu Malla =

Raja of Mallabhum from 1334 to 1345

39th king of the Mallabhum
- Reign: 1334–1345 CE.
- Predecessor: Tapa Malla
- Successor: Kinu Malla II
- Religion: Hinduism

Dinabandhu Malla, also known as Dinu, was the thirty-ninth king of the Mallabhum. He ruled from 1334 to 1345 CE.

== History ==
Dinabandhu Malla was responsible for the establishment of Vishnu Vashudev icon holding Sankha, Chakra, Gada, Padma at Lochanpur.

== Sources ==
- Dasgupta, Gautam Kumar; Biswas, Samira; Mallik, Rabiranjan (2009), Heritage Tourism: An Anthropological Journey to Bishnupur, A Mittal Publication, p. 21, ISBN 978-8183242943
