= Shiv Singh Malla =

Raja of Mallabhum from 1370 to 1407

Raja of Mallabhum
- Reign: 1370–1407
- Predecessor: Shur Malla II
- Successor: Madan Malla
- Religion: Hinduism

Shiv Singh Malla or Shiv Sing Malla, also known as Bir Singh Malla, was the 42nd king of the Mallabhum. He ruled from 1370 to 1407.

== History ==
Shiv Singh Malla was another important king of the Mallabhum. During his time, music had gained an important position.

== Sources ==
- Dasgupta, Gautam Kumar; Biswas, Samira; Mallik, Rabiranjan (2009), Heritage Tourism: An Anthropological Journey to Bishnupur, A Mittal Publication, p. 21, ISBN 978-8183242943
