= Dalmadal Cannon =

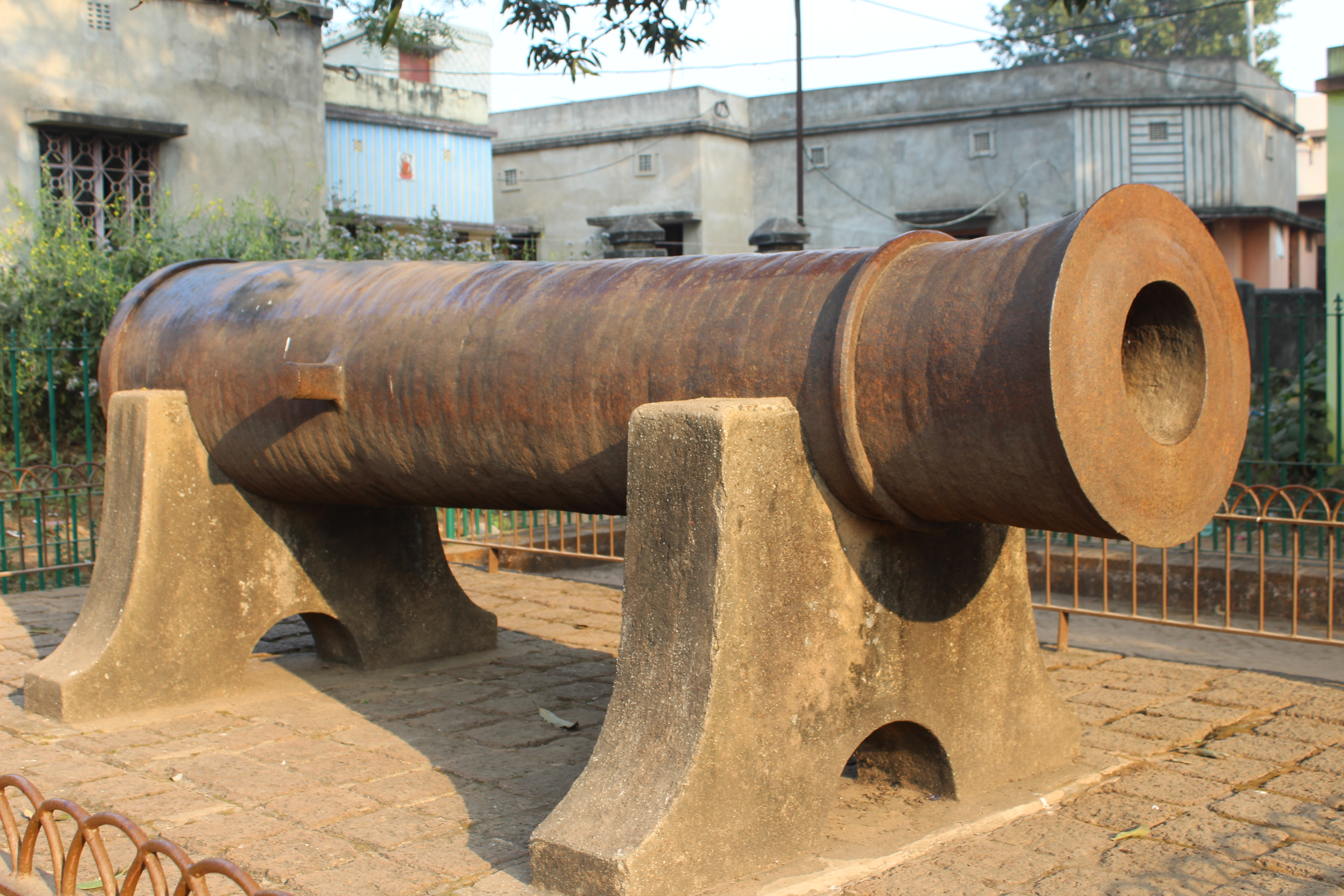
- The historic Dalmadal Cannon.
- Type: Cannon
- Place of origin: Mallabhum, West Bengal, India

Service history
- In service: 18th century
- Used by: Malla Dynasty
- Wars: Defense against Maratha invasions

Production history
- Designer: Jagannath Karmakar
- Designed: 1742
- Unit cost: Rs. 1.25 lakh (historical)
- Produced: 1742
- No. built: 1

Specifications
- Mass: 12 MT (296 maund)
- Length: 3.8 m (12 ft)
- Diameter: 28.5 cm (285 mm)
- Barrels: 1
- Carriage: Masonry platform

The Dalmadal Cannon, also known as the Dal Madal Kaman, was built under the orders of Raja Gopal Singha in 1742 at the cost of Rs. 1.25 lakh, an enormous sum for the time. The blacksmith Jagannath Karmakar forged the cannon, which weighs approximately 296 maunds (around 11,840 kg) and has a length of 3.8 meters. The cannon's body was constructed by connecting 63 iron rings together, giving it a rust-proof finish. Its impressive size is marked by a circumference of 6'10" in the middle and front and 8'3.5" at the rear.

== Design and Features ==
The Dalmadal Cannon is designed with an opening for inserting gunpowder, located on the upper rear section. A small square groove, known as the Ranjakghar, was used to ignite the cannon by filling it with gunpowder. The middle section of the cannon is fitted with two iron sticks, each about 6 feet long and 4 feet in circumference, that were used to connect it to two iron wheels.

== Legend and Myth ==
A popular local legend surrounds the Dalmadal Cannon, claiming that it was miraculously fired by Lord Madan Mohan, the tutelary deity of the Malla kings, to protect Bishnupur from the Maratha invader Bhaskar Rao. According to the myth, during a Maratha attack, Lord Madan Mohan himself operated the cannon, causing the invaders to retreat. This divine intervention story has become a cherished part of Bishnupur's cultural lore.

== Tourism and Cultural Importance ==
The Dalmadal Cannon is part of Bishnupur's rich cultural landscape, which includes numerous UNESCO-listed terracotta temples. Over the years, the cannon has become a focal point for tourists interested in the military history of the Malla dynasty. The site can be visited year-round, and entry is free. It forms a central piece in Bishnupur's historical tourism circuit, which includes notable sites like the Rasmancha and Madanmohan Temple.

== See also ==
- Mallabhum kingdom
- Temples of Bishnupur
- Madan Mohan Temple, Bishnupur
