= Madan Mohan Temple, Bishnupur =

Madan Mohan Temple
- মদনমোহন মন্দির
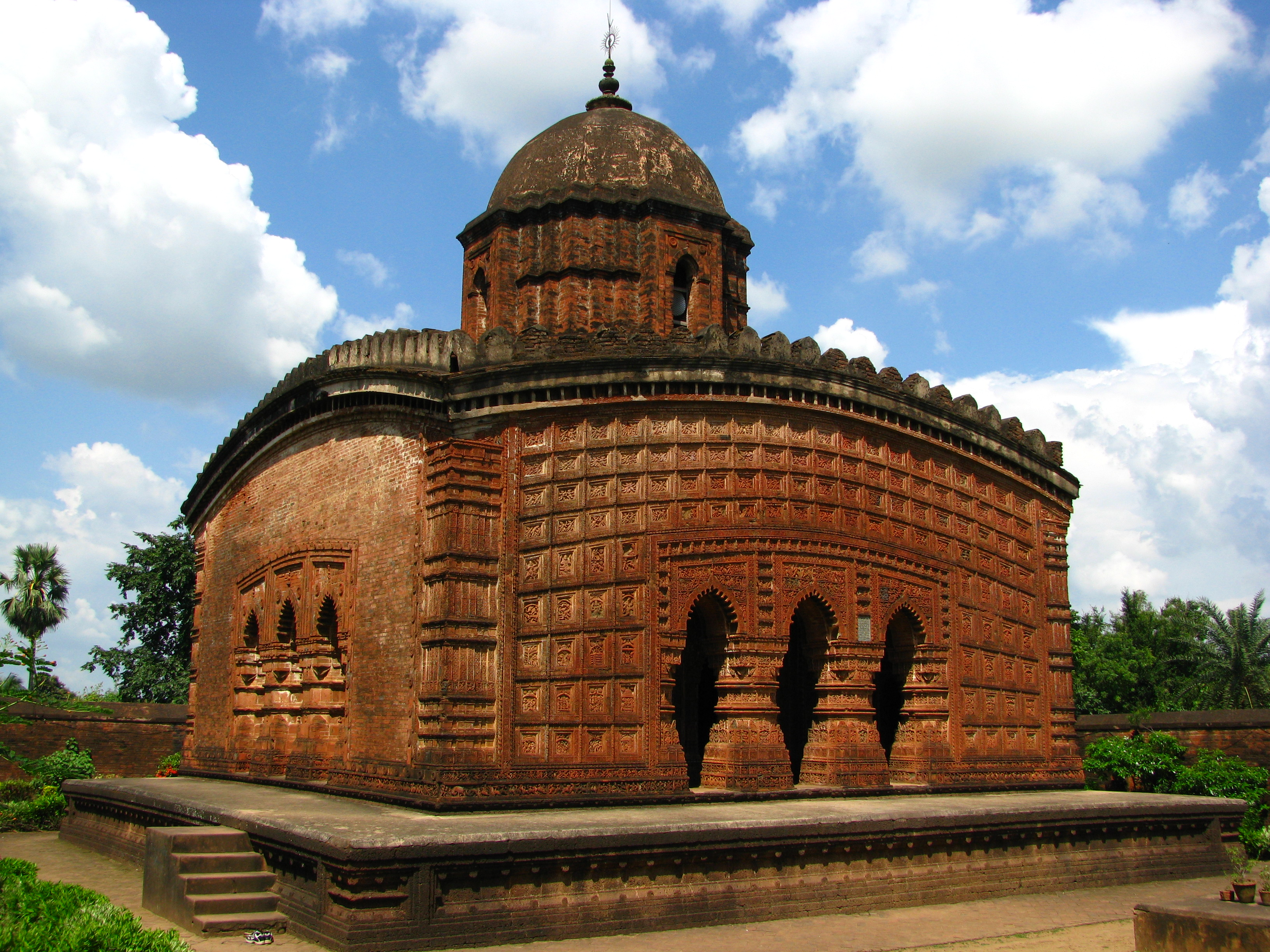

Religion
- Affiliation: Hinduism
- District: Bankura
- Deity: Madanamohana (a form of Krishna)

Location
- Location: Bishnupur
- State: West Bengal
- Country: India
- Interactive map of Madan Mohan Temple
- Coordinates: 23°4′50.50747″N 87°19′24.94999″E

Architecture
- Type: Bengal temple architecture
- Style: eka-ratna style
- Founder: Durjan Singha Dev
- Established: 1694; 332 years ago

Specifications
- Direction of façade: South
- Length: 12.2 metres (40 ft)
- Width: 12.2 metres (40 ft)
- Height (max): 10.7 metres (35 ft)
- Monument of National Importance
- Official name: Madan Mohan Temple
- Type: Cultural
- Reference no.: N-WB-15

Madan Mohan Temple or Madanamōhana mandir is a Krishna temple in Bishnupur town of Medinipur division. In the past, the Hindu deity Krishna was worshiped in the form of Madanamohan in this temple, but currently no worship is conducted. According to the foundation plaque found in the temple, the temple was founded in 1694 CE (1000 Mallabda) by King Durjan Singha Dev of Mallabhum. The temple is a unique example of ekaratna temple architecture, which belongs to the Ratna style developed in medieval Bengal.

The roof of this temple is square and sloping, and there is a tower with a dome in the center of the roof. The temple is much known for the ornamentation, which adorns the walls of this temple. The ornamentations are mainly placed on terracotta plaques set into the walls. Various scenes of Krishna-lila, Dashavatara and other mythological stories are sculpted on the walls of the temple.

Currently the temple is preserved as one of the archeological monument by the Archaeological Survey of India.

== Architecture ==
The Madan Mohan Temple is built in the eka-ratna type of Ratna style, one of the styles of temple architecture in Bengal. The structure of the temple consists of garbhagriha with curved roofs and a ratna. The temple incorporates primary elements of the Chala style with its curved cornice, which was common in Hindu temples in Bengal built during this period. The exterior and interior of the temple have been protected and preserved by the Archaeological Survey of India.

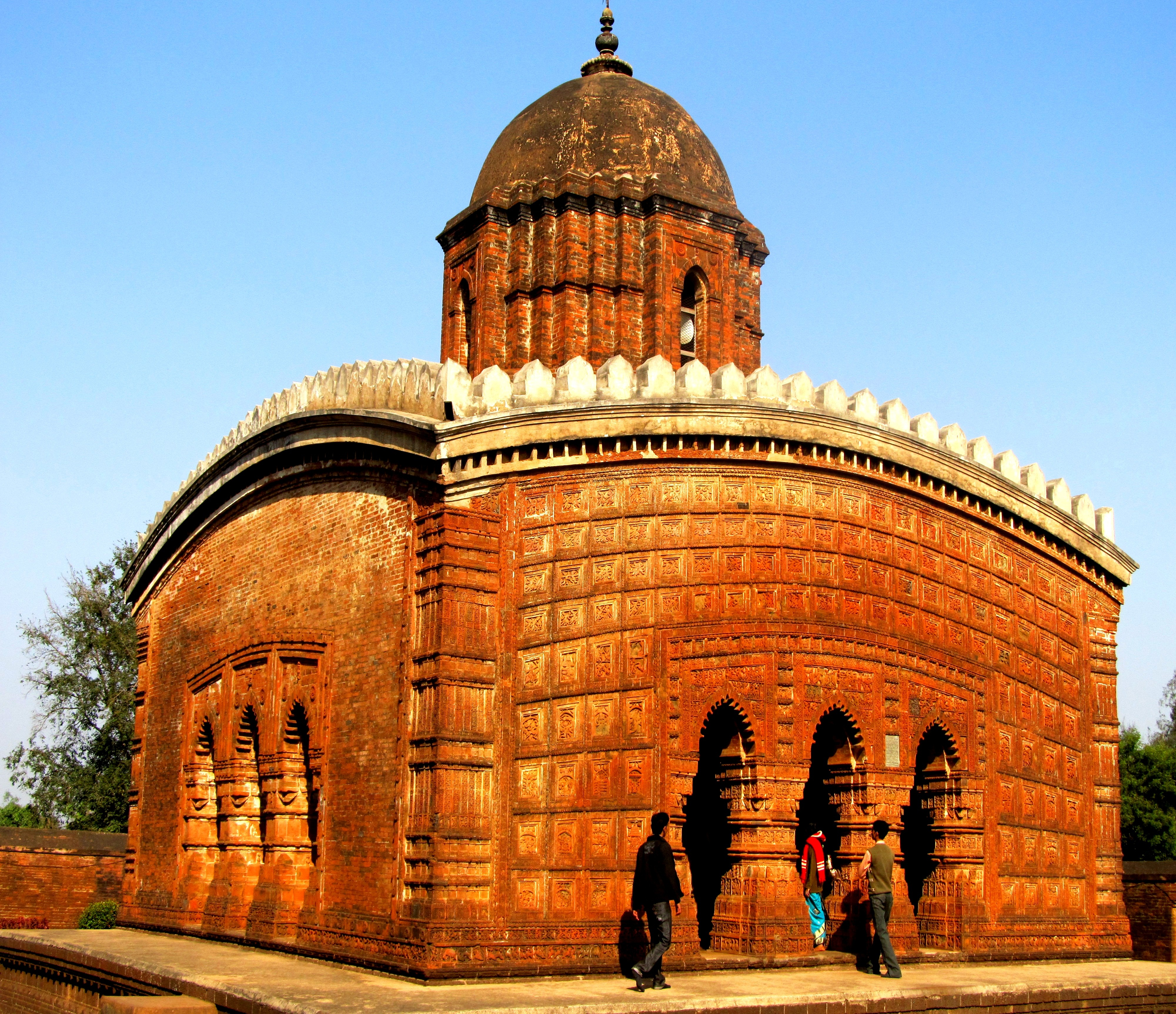
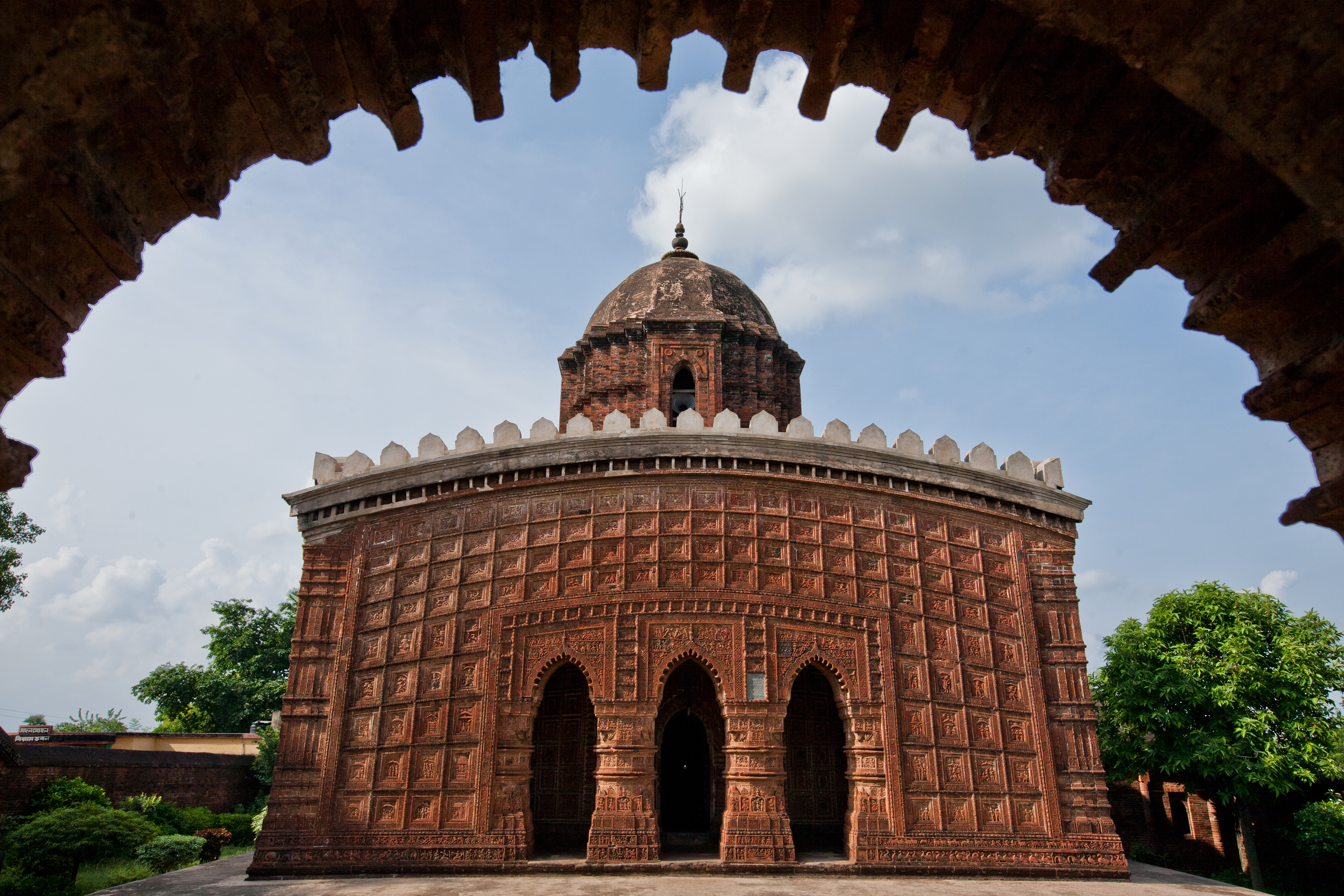
Left: The southern and western parts of the temple, along with the ratna (sikhara) are visible., Right: Front view of the temple.

The temple stands on a stone-built platform, its length and width are both 12.2 meters (40 ft). The floor of the temple measures 148.84 sq m (1600 sq ft). The temple is 10.7 m (35 ft) high, resting on a 1.4 m (4 ft 7 in) high makra-stone plinth, and is facing south.

== Legend and Myth ==
A popular local legend surrounds the Dalmadal Cannon, claiming that it was miraculously fired by Lord Madan Mohan, the tutelary deity of the Malla kings, to protect Bishnupur from the Maratha invader Bhaskar Rao. According to the myth, during a Maratha attack, Lord Madan Mohan himself operated the cannon, causing the invaders to retreat. This divine intervention story has become a cherished part of Bishnupur's cultural lore.

== Bibliography ==
- Biswas, S. S. (1992). "The Temples". Bishnupur (2nd ed.). New Delhi: Archaeological Survey of India.
- Ghosh, Pika (2005). Temple to Love: Architecture and Devotion in Seventeenth-Century Bengal. Bloomington and Indianapolis: Indiana University Press.
- Bandyopadhyay, Amiya Kumar (1971). Bām̐kuṛā jēlāra purākīrti বাঁকুড়া জেলার পুরাকীর্তি [Antiquities of Bankura District]. Kolkata: Public Works Department, West Bengal.
