= Bir Singha Dev =

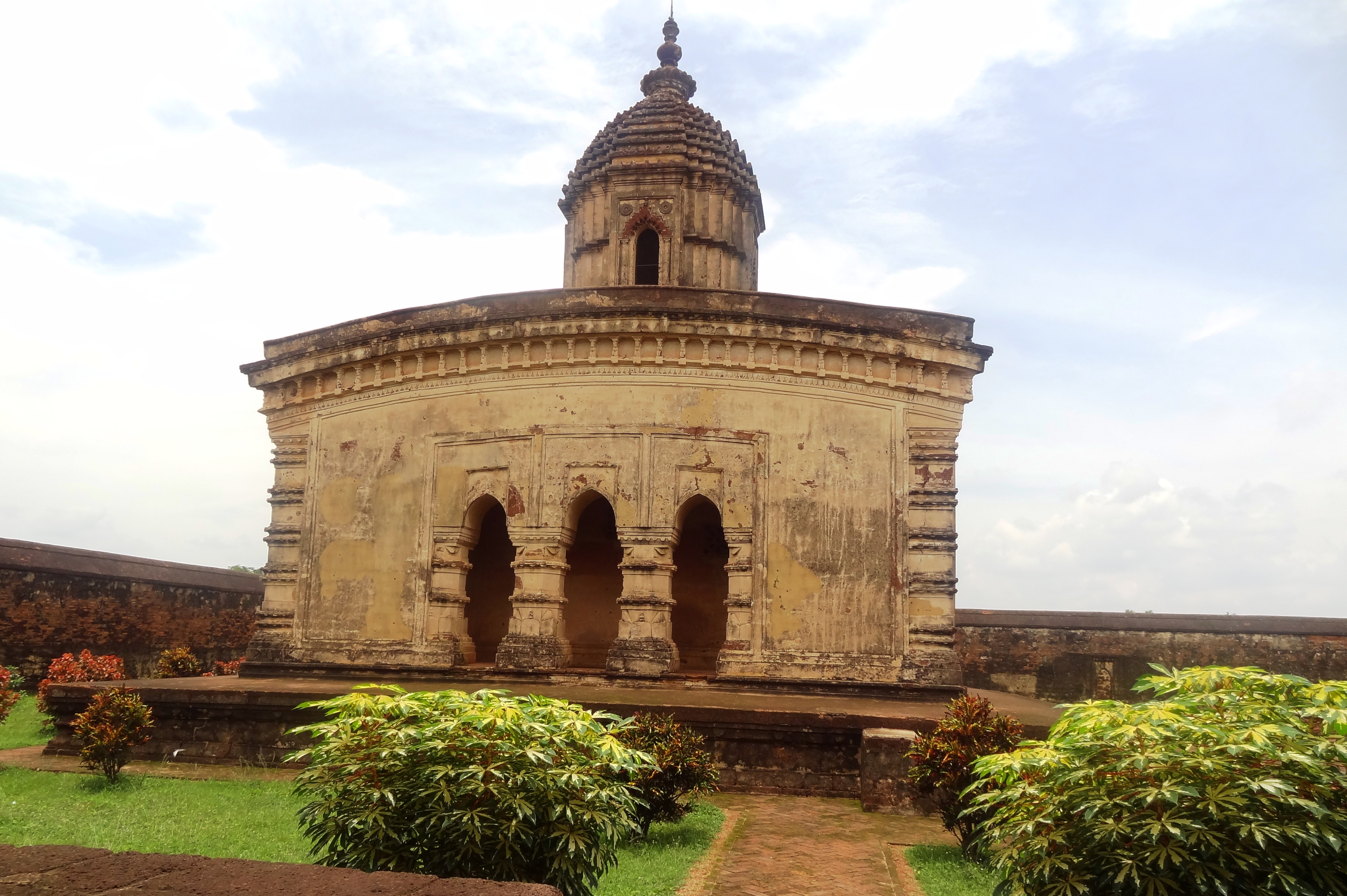

52nd king of the Mallabhum
- Reign: 1656–1682
- Predecessor: Raghunath Singha Dev
- Successor: Durjan Singha Dev
- Wives: Churamoni(Siromoni Devi); Swamamoyee Devi
- Issue: Durjan Singha Dev; Sur Singha Dev; Krishna Singha Dev; Baldev Singha Dev
- Father: Raghunath Singha Dev
- Religion: Hinduism

Bir Singha Dev (also known as Beera Singha, and Bir Singha I) was the fifty-second king of the Mallabhum. He ruled from 1656 to 1682 CE.

== History ==
=== Personal life ===
Bir Singha Dev was the son of Raghunath Singha Dev. During his reign, his kingdom expanded. This was the period when Aurangzeb was the emperor. History describes Aurangzeb as a cruel ruler who seized all tax-free lands, known as bepanchaki jamin, from them.

Bir Singha Dev had two queens. His elder queen, Churamoni (or Siromoni Devi), was a pious woman with three sons: Durjan, Sur, and Krishna Singha Dev. His younger queen, Swamamoyee Devi, was cruel and had one son. Believing her son would not inherit the throne, she persuaded Bir Singha Dev to kill the sons of his first wife. Tragically, the king followed her instructions and murdered his three sons from his first wife. However, Durjan Singha Dev managed to escape and survive.

Later, the second wife’s only son, Baldev, died. Realizing the enormity of his actions, Bir Singha Dev was filled with regret, disappointment, and remorse. He desperately sought a successor, and it was then that Durjan Singha Dev returned to him. The king, unaware that Durjan had survived, was relieved to see him. Finding peace of mind, Bir Singha Dev named Durjan Singha Dev his successor, and he became king after Bir Singha Dev’s death.

=== Reservoir ===
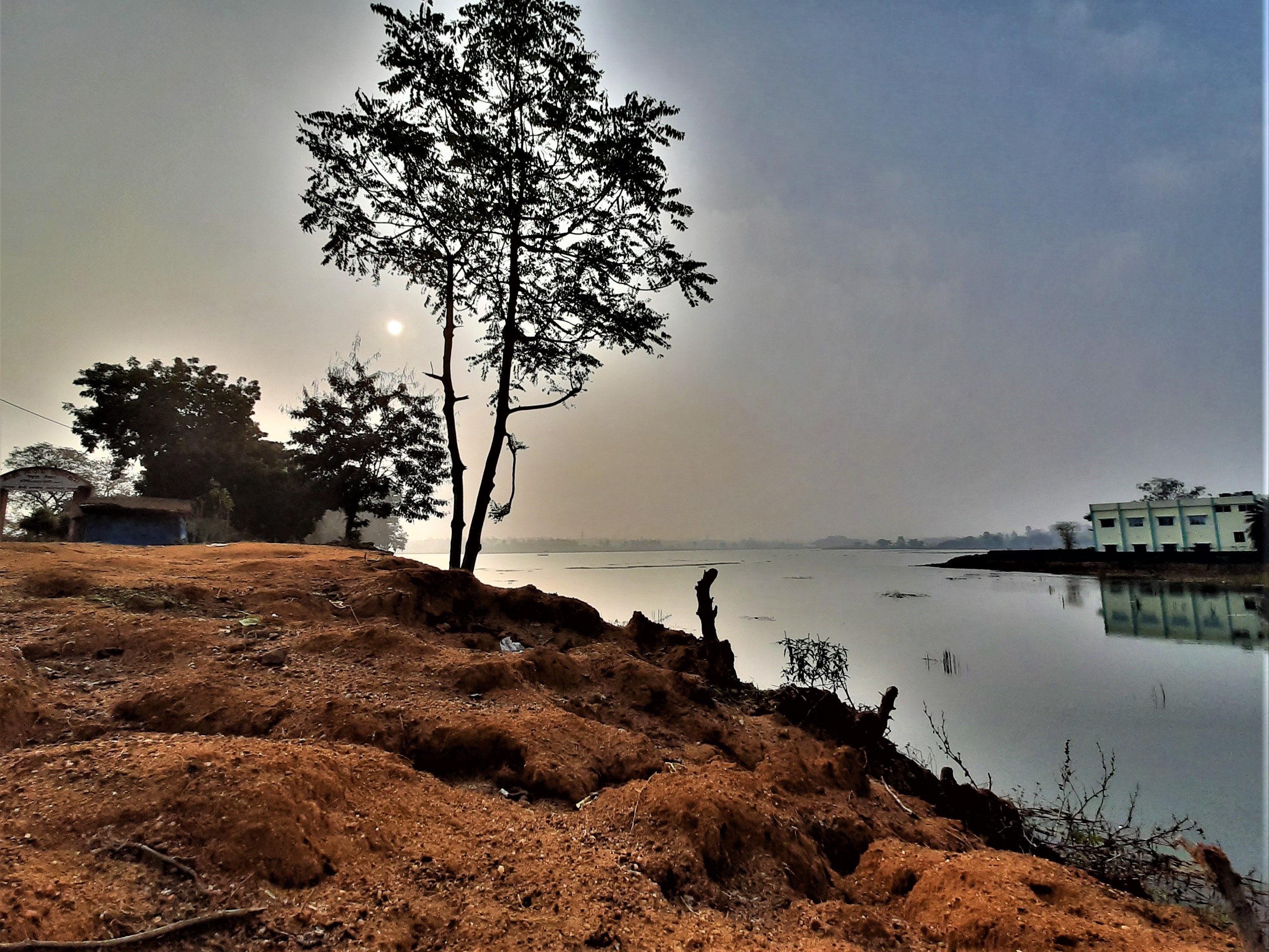
Lalbandh

He also had the seven big lakes or tanks, called Lalbandh, Krishnabandh, Gantatbandh, Jamunabandh, Kalindibandh, Shyambandh, and pokabandh excavated, and erected.

== Mallabhum temples ==
Despite his cruelty, Bir Singha Dev possessed an aesthetic sense. During his reign, numerous temples were constructed, showcasing remarkable artistic craftsmanship. In accordance with the wishes of Queen Siromoni Devi, two temples were constructed and dedicated to Radha Krishna: Madan Mohan and Madan Gopal. In Bishnupur, he established both small and large stone gates, as well as the Radha lal Jiu temple.

=== Radha Laljiu/Lalji temple ===
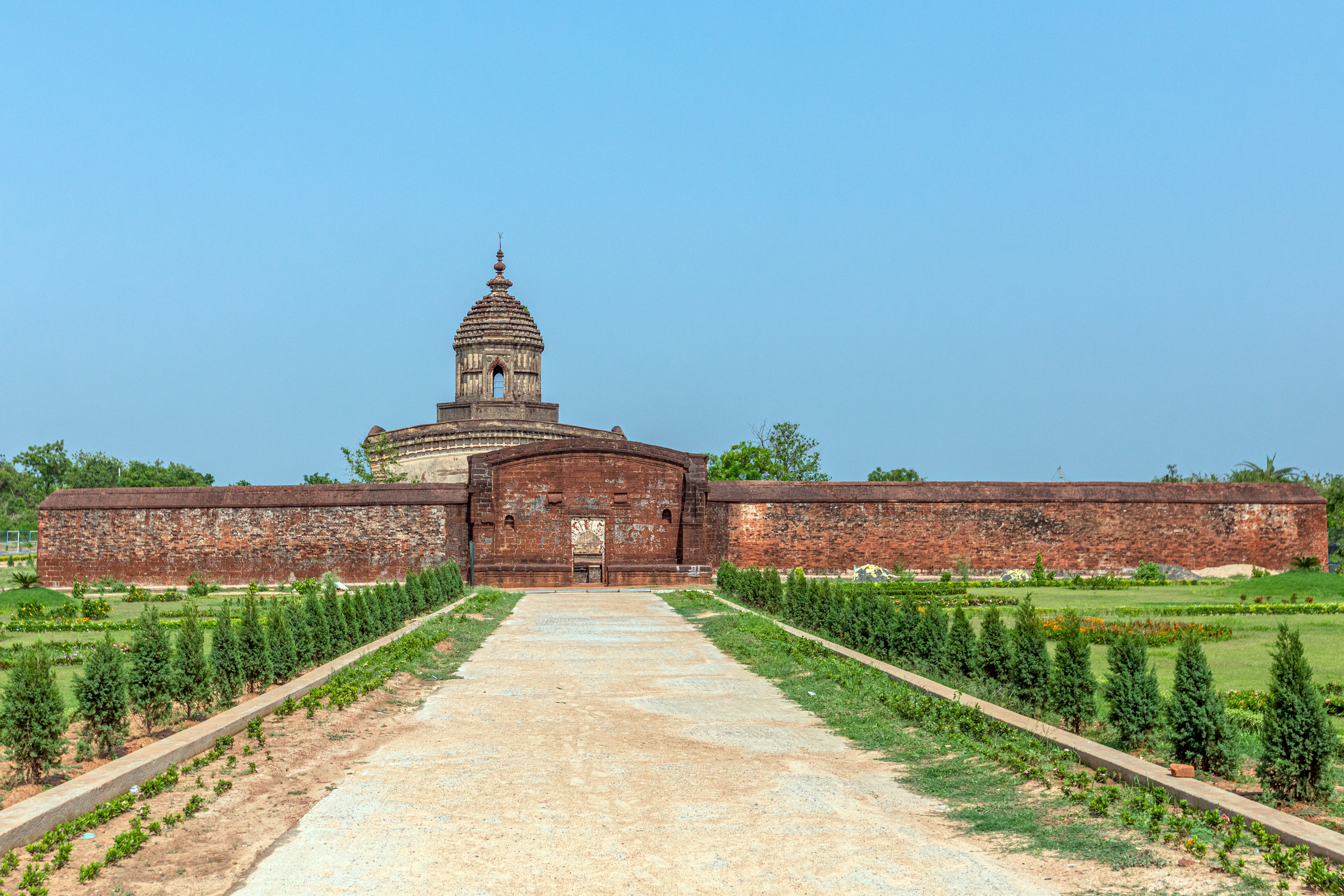

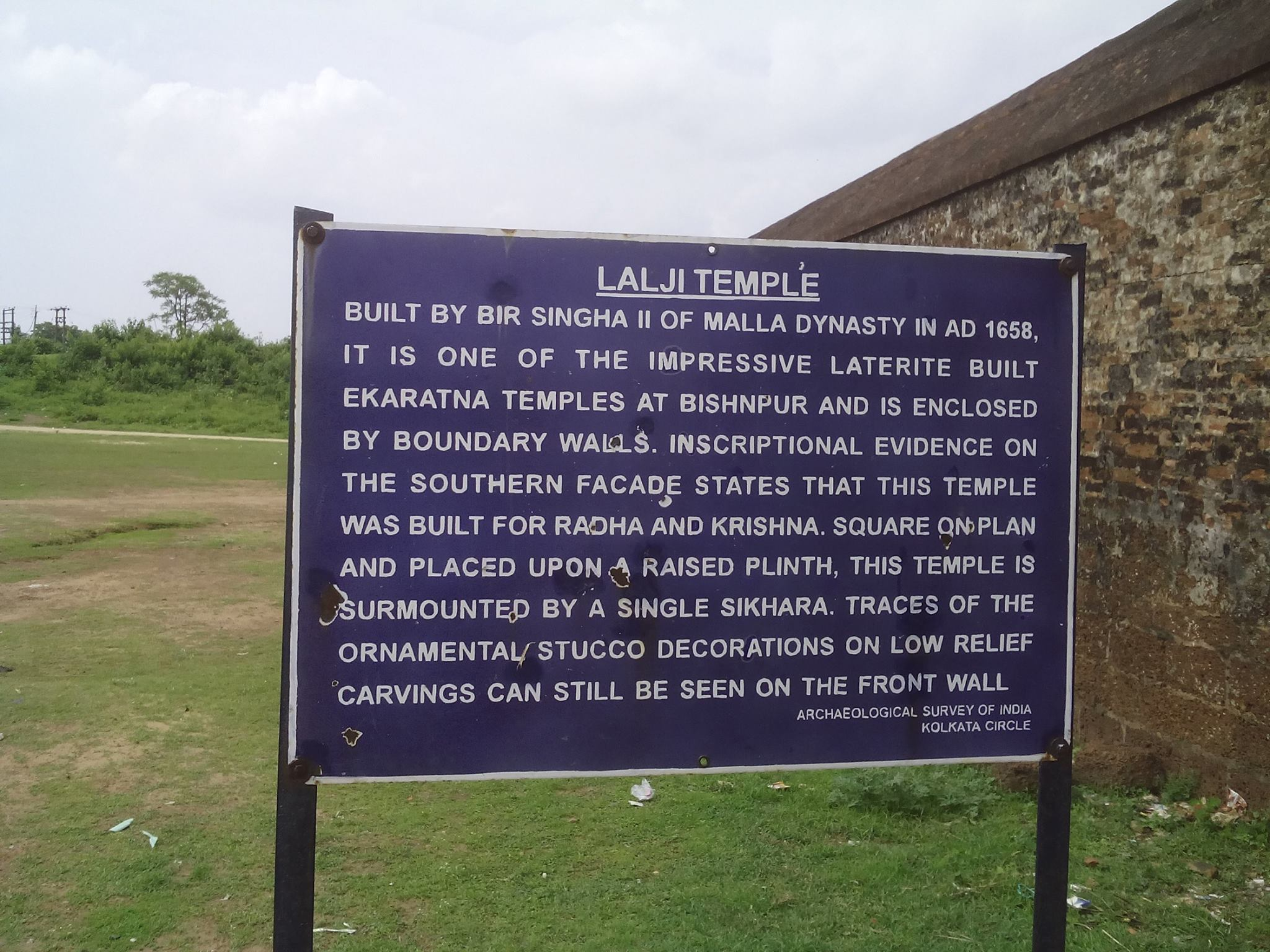

After crossing the big stone gate if one stands facing south, one can see the palace and on the north or left side there are several temples. Among those, a laterite temple is found. Bir Singha Dev established it in 1658. It is a Ekratna temple. There are figures of birds and animals with fresco painting. The temple is placed upon a large plinth. It is a square shaped temple with slanting roof slightly sloping in all sides. It has a nahabat khana (room or platform where the sanai concert is played), nat mandir (portico of a temple) that reminds the visitors, tourists and travelers about the recreational life of the Malla dynasty. In the temple) deity is there and everyday puja is performed officiated by a Brahman.

=== Murali Mohan temple ===
This magnificent temple was built by Siromani Chudamoni Devi, the queen of Raja Bir Singha Dev and mother of Durjan Singha Dev in 1665. This latente ekratna temple is dedicated to Murali Mohan Jiu. A few decorations of floral designs is noticed. Stuccowork is found in this temple.

== Image gallery ==
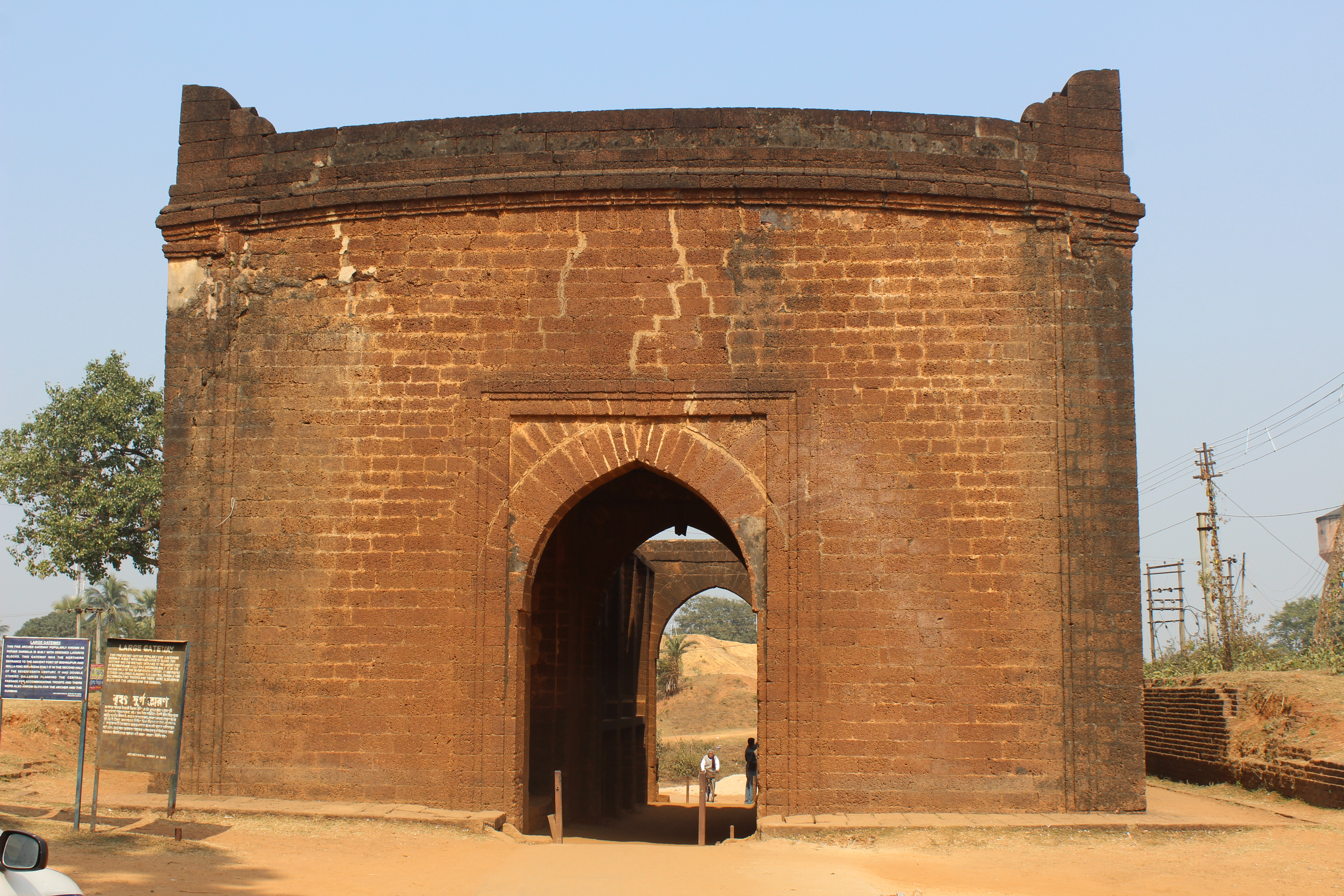

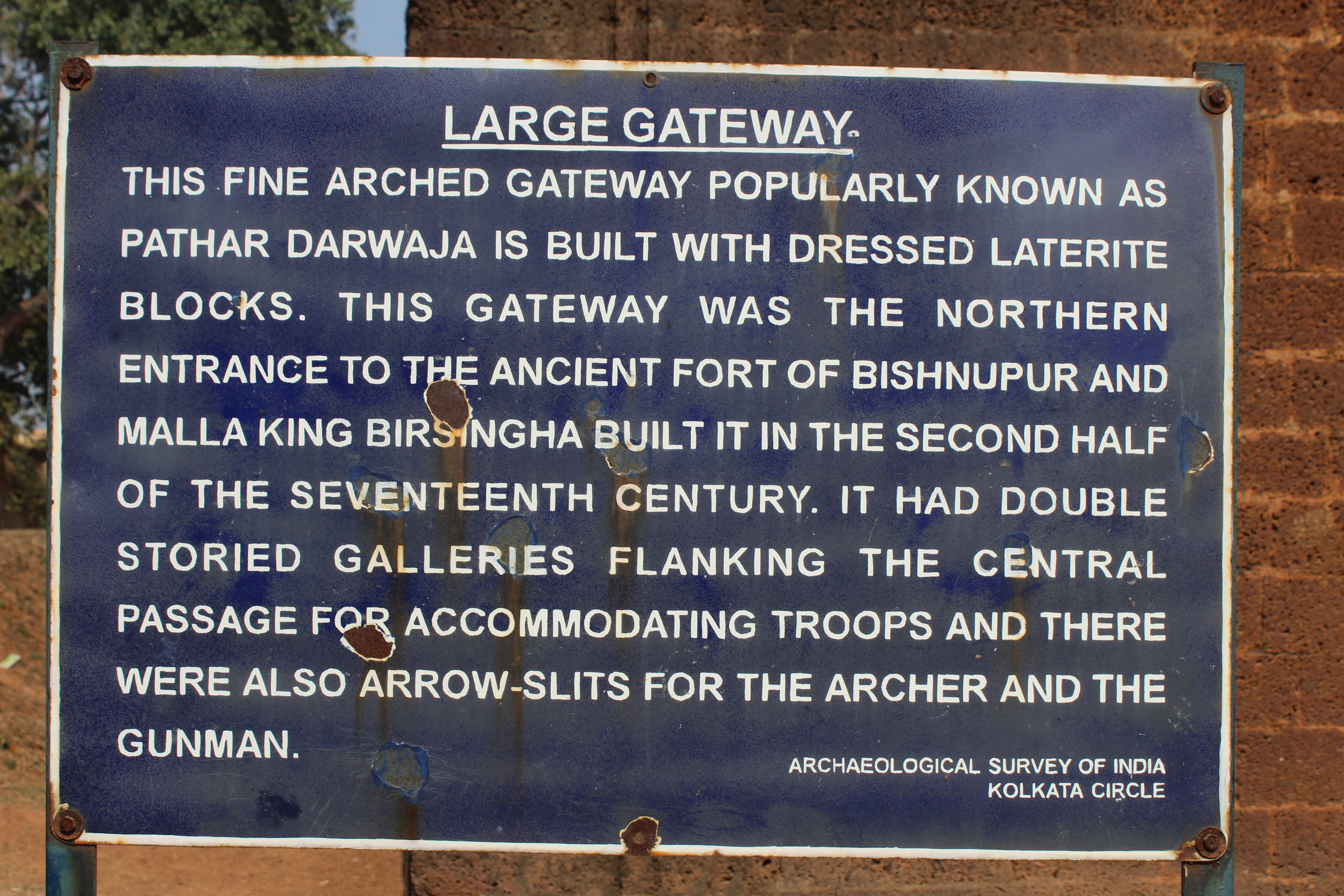

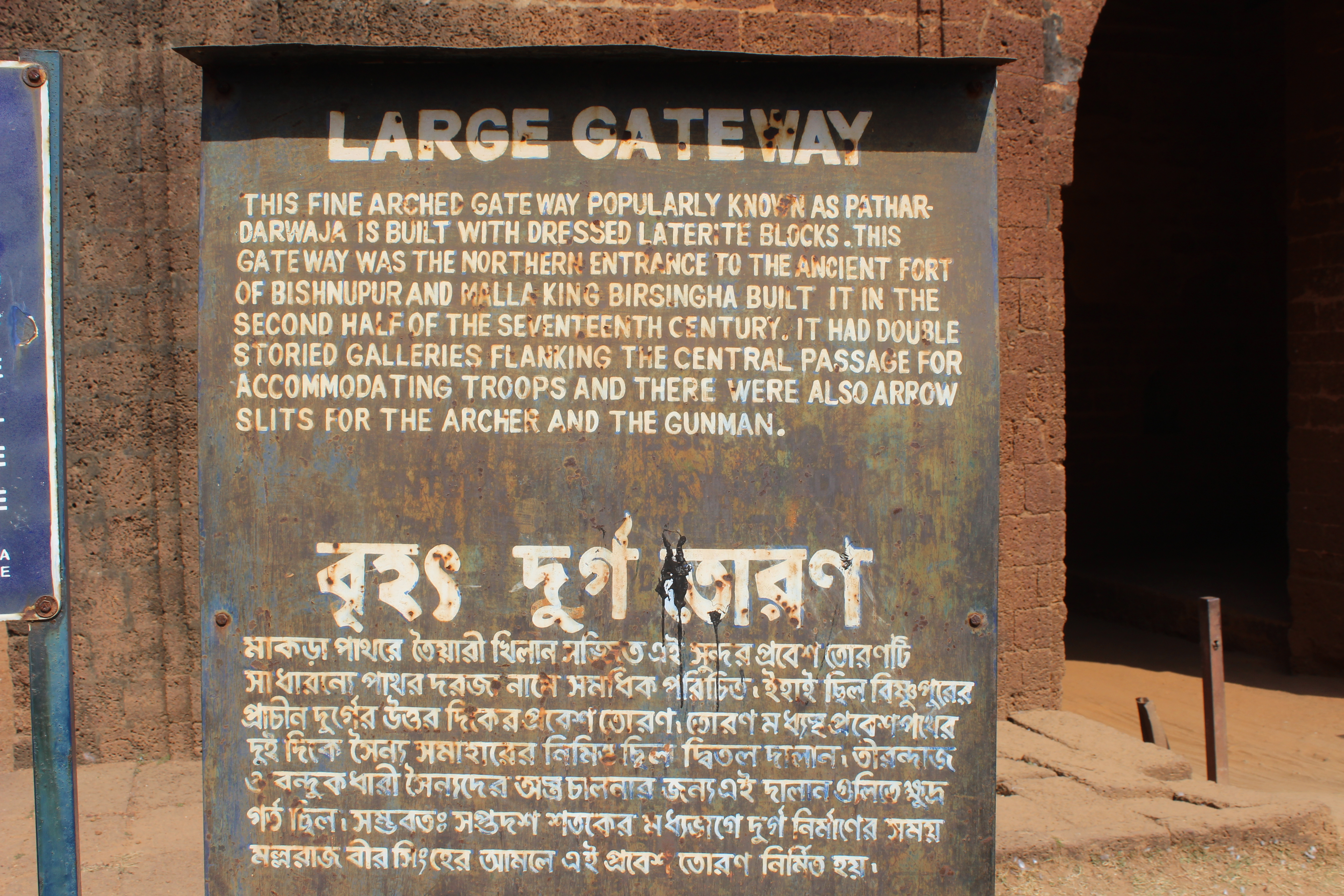

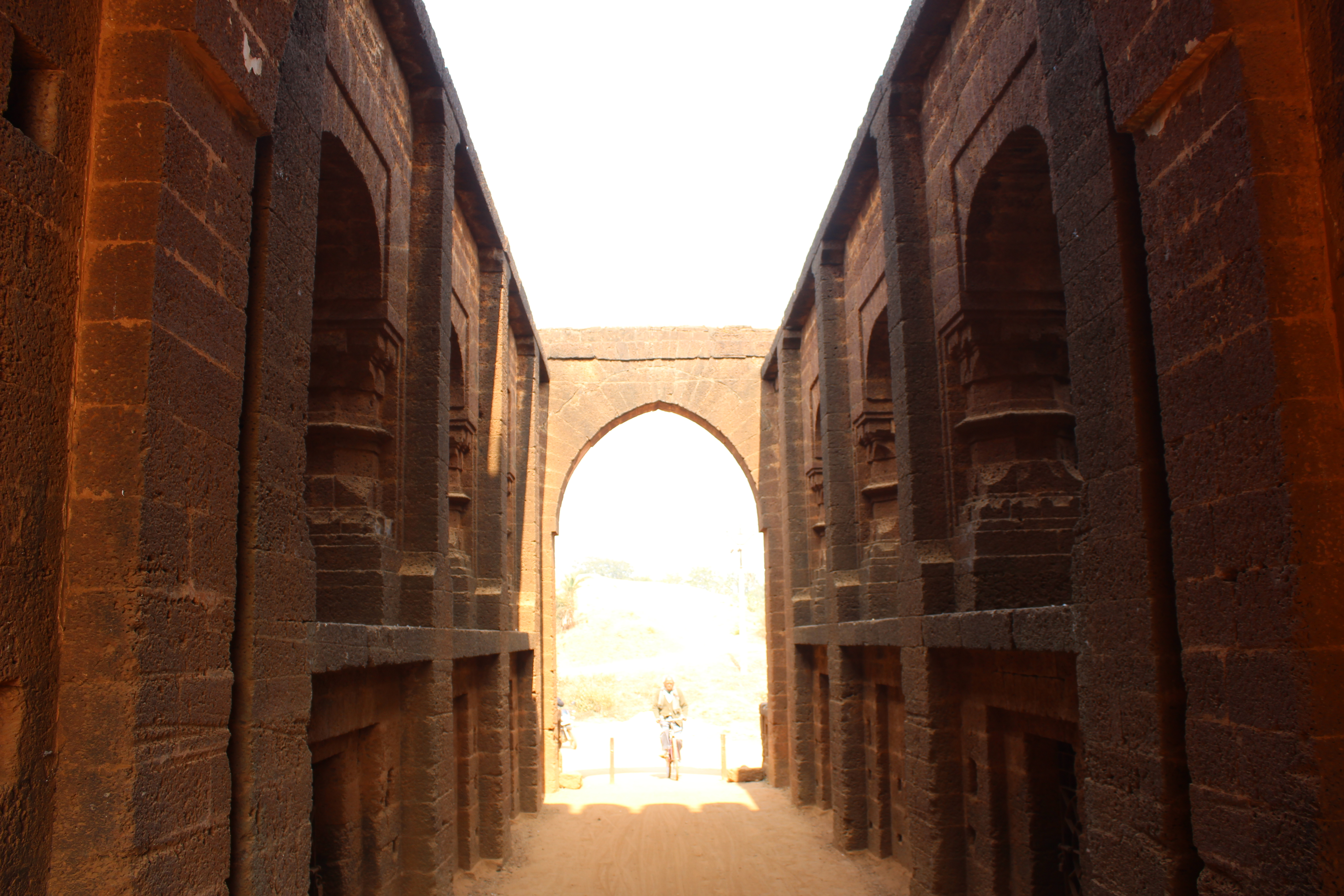

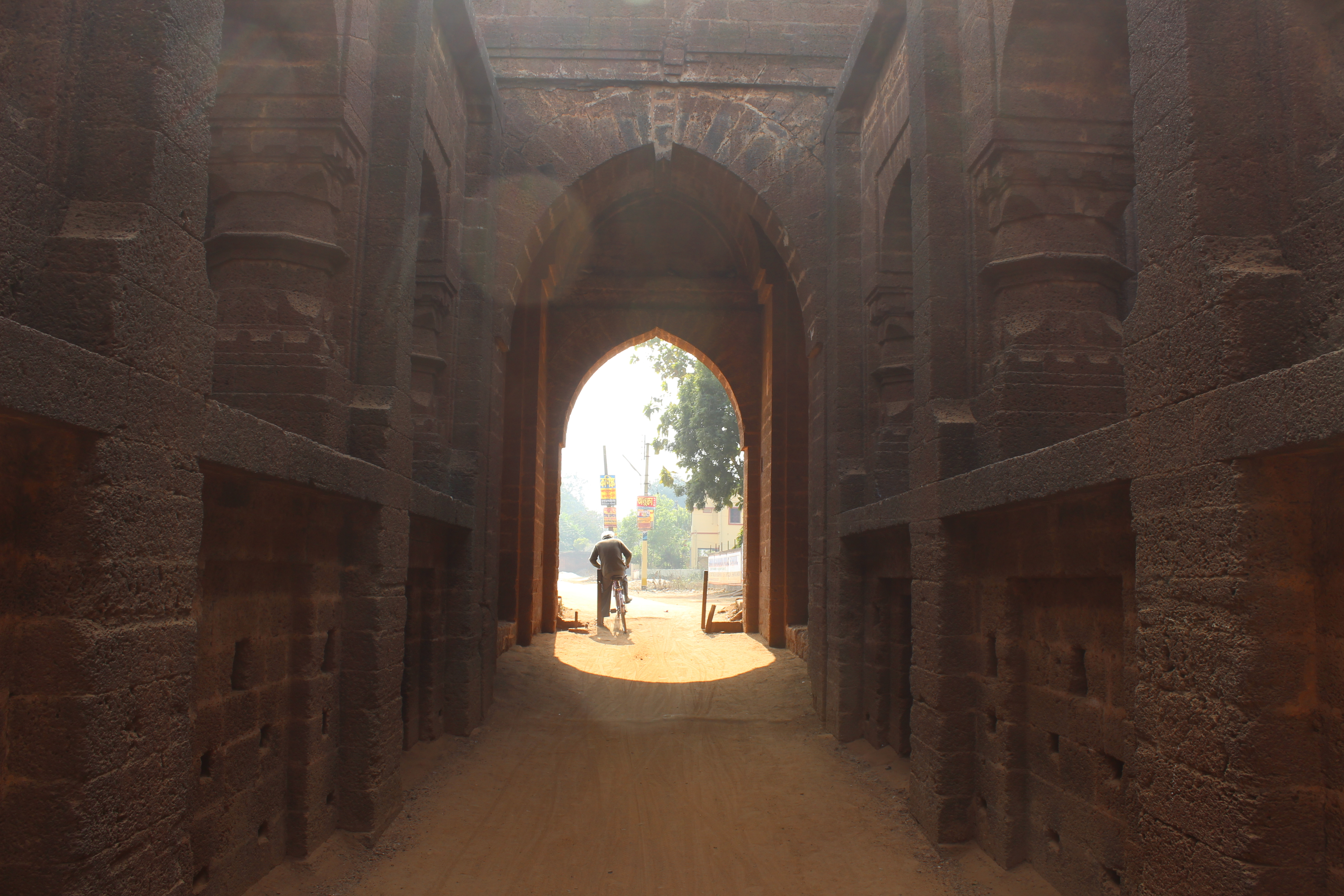

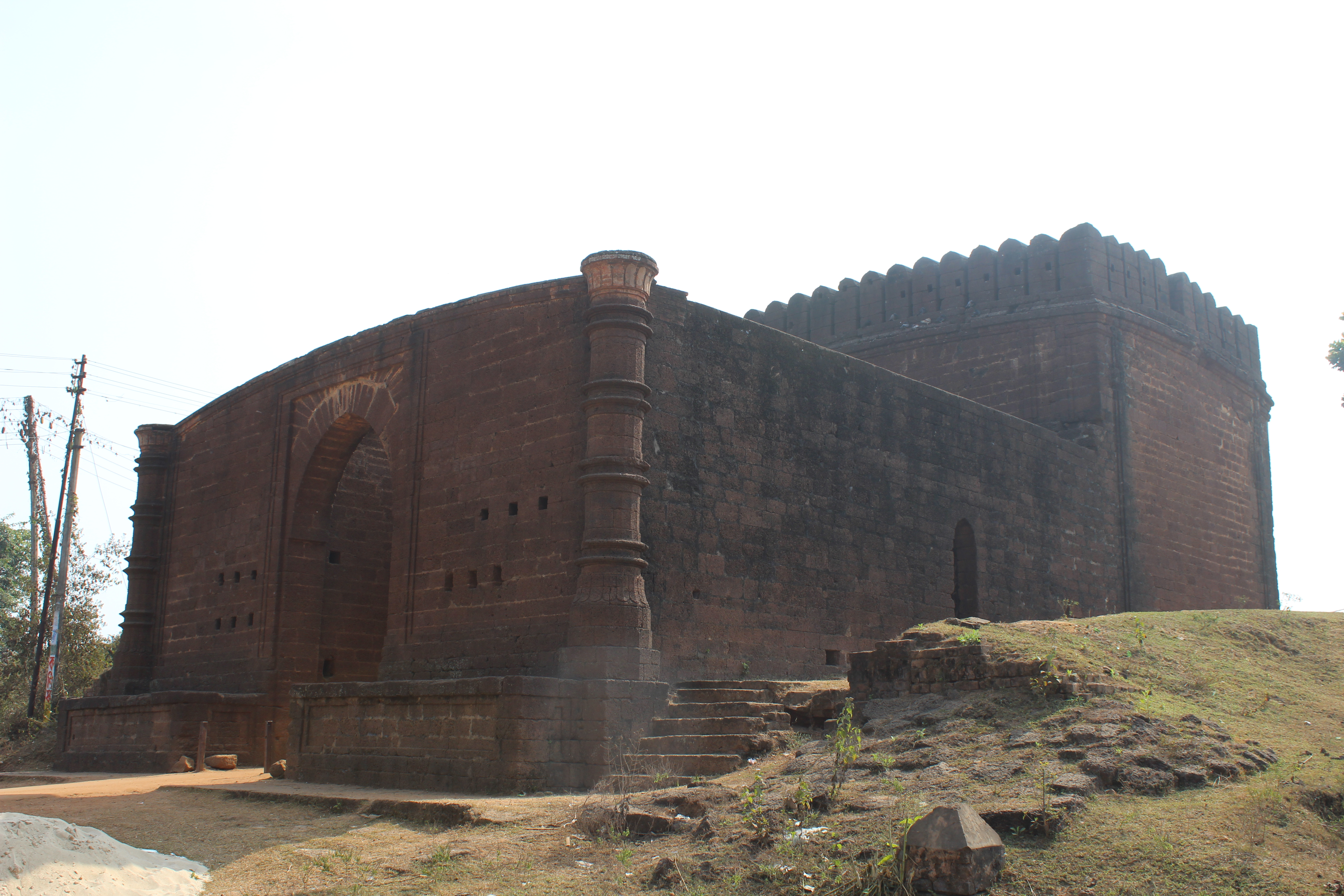

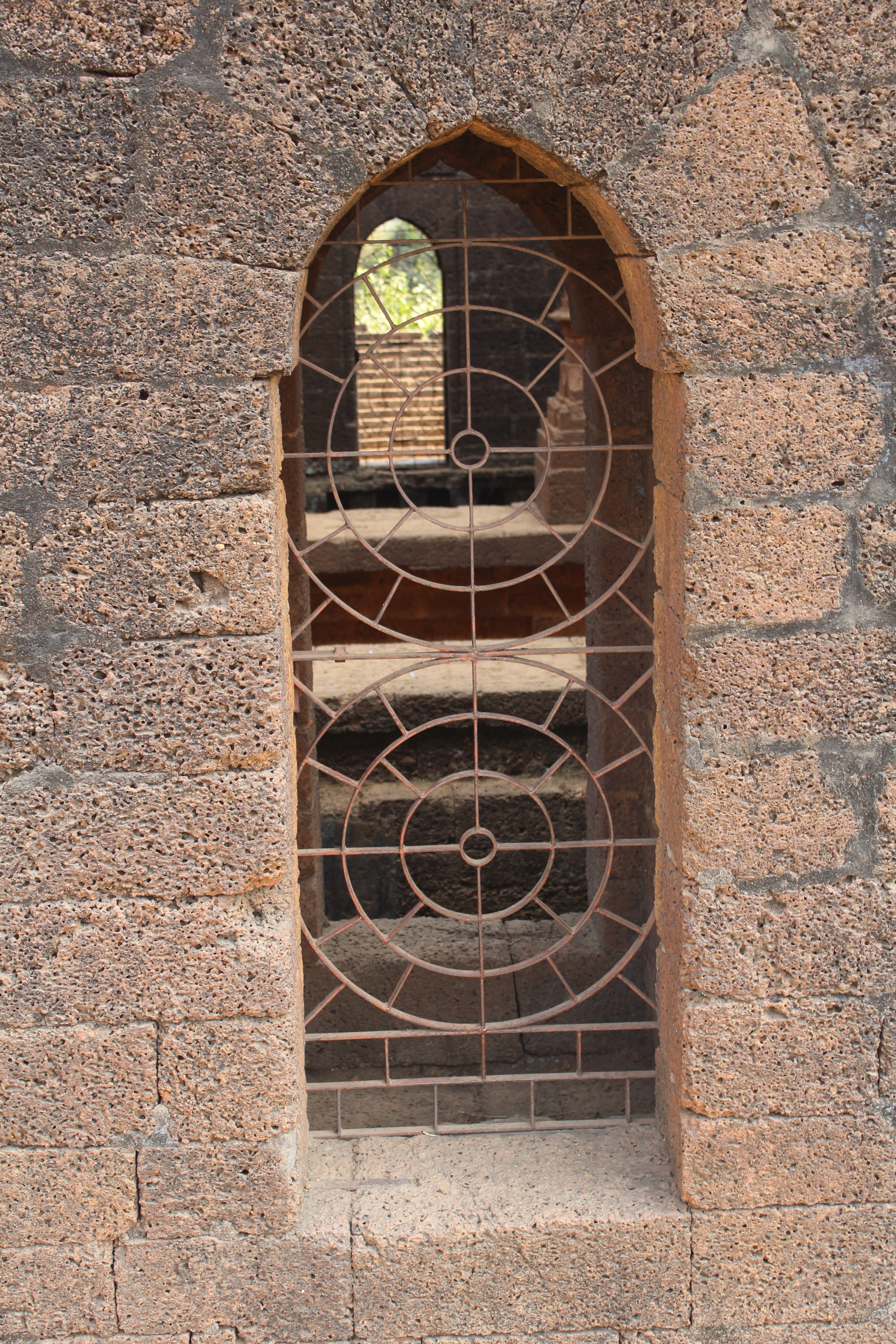

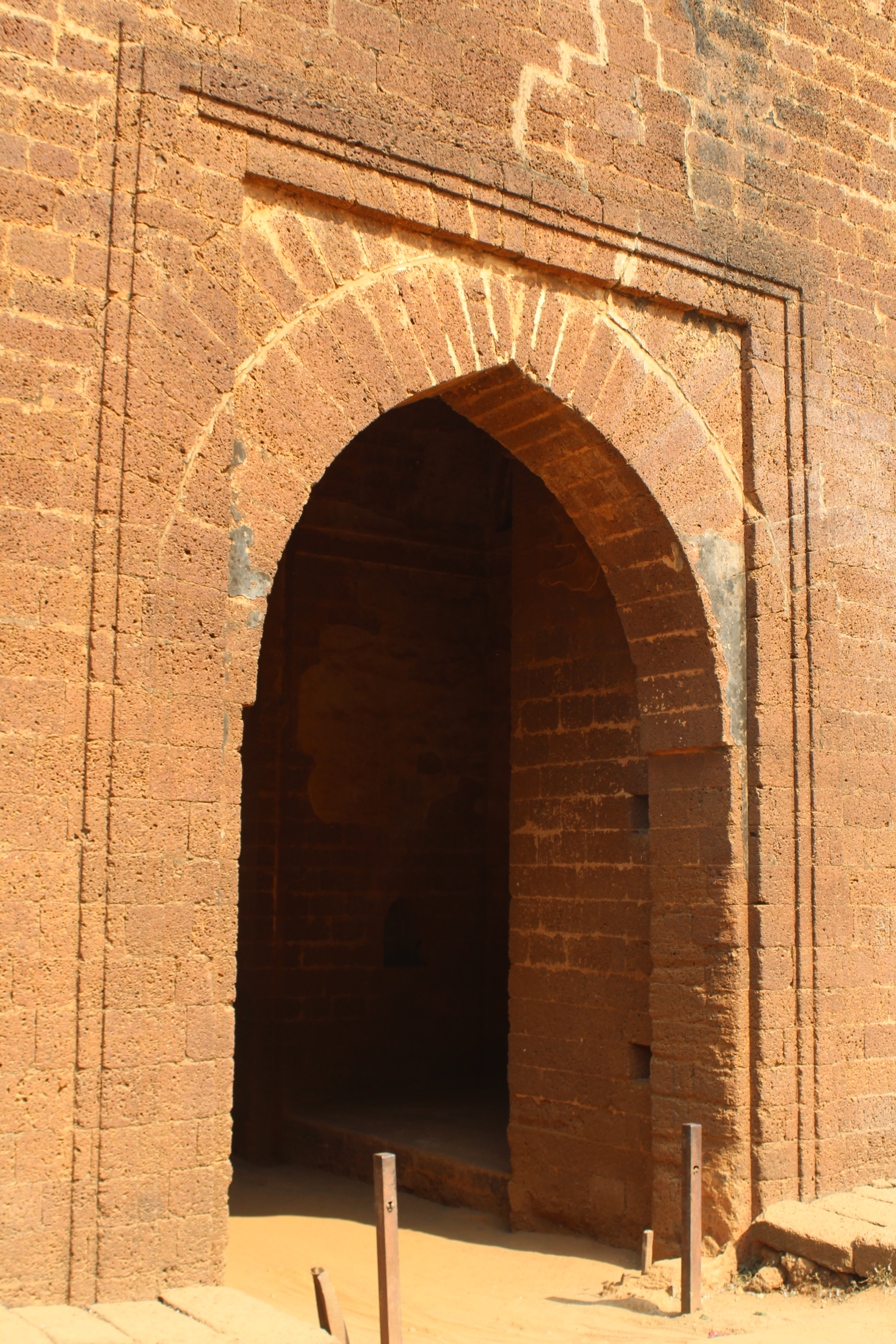

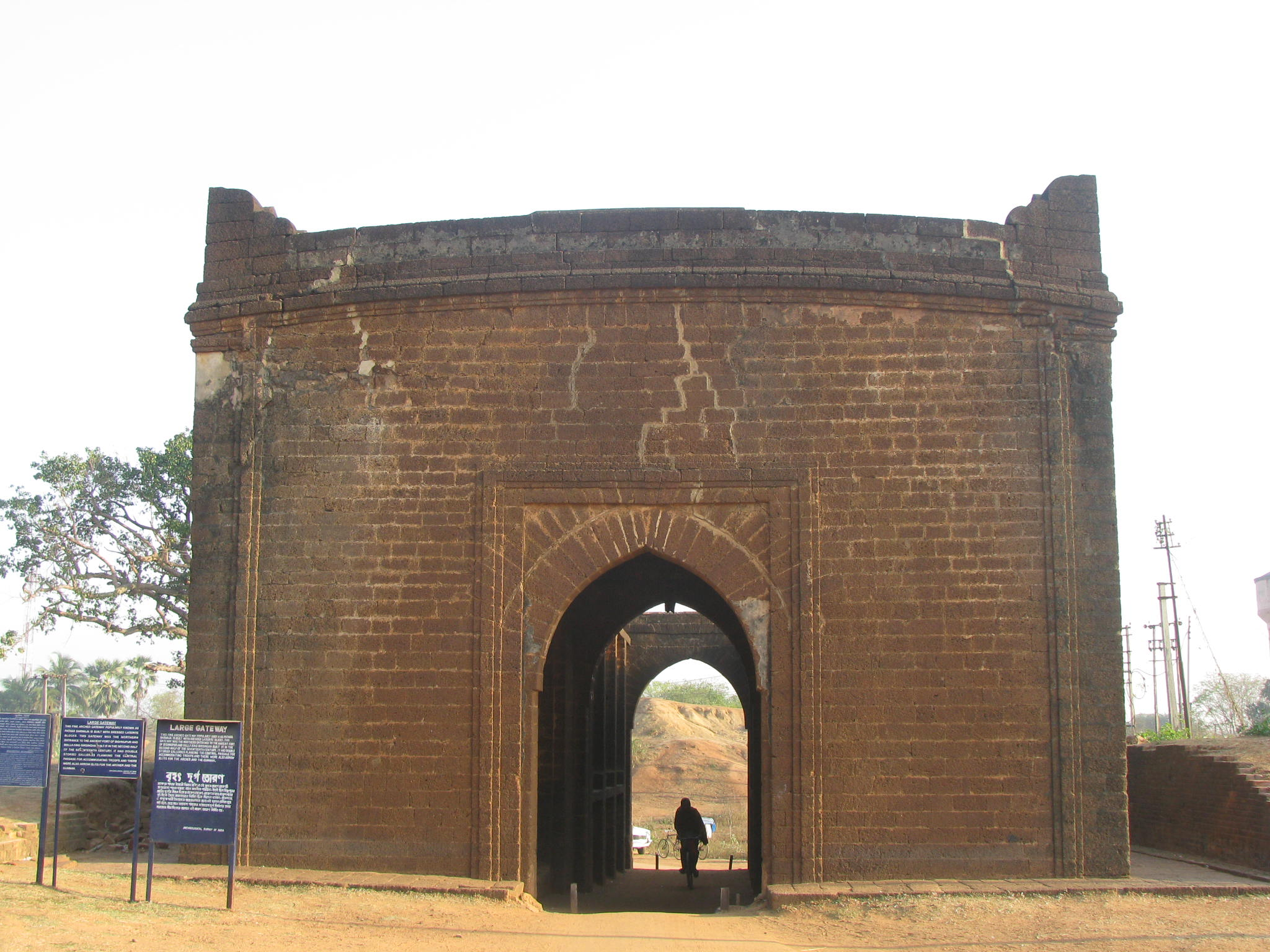

== Sources ==
- Dasgupta, Gautam Kumar; Biswas, Samira; Mallik, Rabiranjan (2009), Heritage Tourism: An Anthropological Journey to Bishnupur, A Mittal Publication, p. 37, ISBN 978-8183242943
- Biswas, S. S. (1992). Bishnupur (University of Illinois at Urbana-Champaign ed.). Director General, Archaeological Survey of India.
