= Radha Shyam Temple =

- রাধাশ্যাম মন্দির
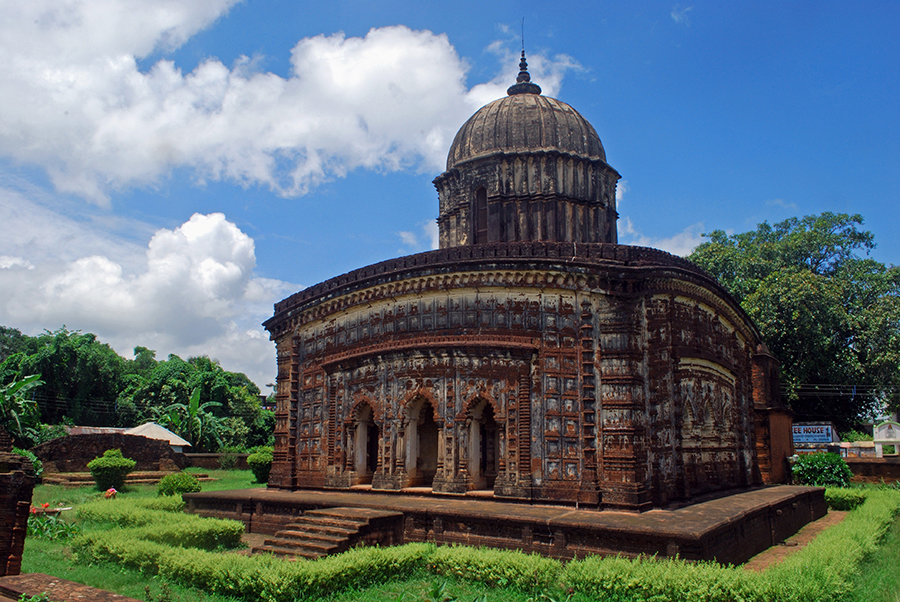

Religion
- Affiliation: Hinduism
- District: Bankura
- Deity: Radha Shyam (Divine couple in Hinduism)

Location
- Location: Bishnupur
- State: West Bengal
- Country: India
- Interactive map of Radha Shyam Temple
- Coordinates: 23°4′20.85661″N 87°19′35.04274″E

Architecture
- Type: Bengal temple architecture
- Style: eka-ratna style
- Founder: Chaitanya Singha
- Established: 1758; 268 years ago

Specifications
- Direction of façade: South
- Length: 12.5 metres (41 ft)
- Width: 12.5 metres (41 ft)
- Height (max): 10.7 metres (35 ft)
- Monument of National Importance
- Official name: Radha Shyam Temple
- Type: Cultural
- Reference no.: N-WB-23

Radha Shyam Temple, also known as Rādhāśyāma Mandir, is a Krishna temple in Bishnupur town of Medinipur division in the Indian state of West Bengal. In this temple, the Hindu god Krishna is worshiped in the form of Shyam; along with Shyam, the murti of Radha is also worshipped.

== History and architecture ==
According to the foundation plaque found in the temple, the temple was founded in 1758 by King Chaitanya Singha of Mallabhum. The temple is a unique example of eka-ratna temple architecture, which belongs to the ratna style developed in medieval Bengal.

The roof of this temple is square and curved, with curved edges and a domed shikhar (tower) in the middle. The temple is known for its ornamentation, which adorns the surrounding walls of this temple. The ornamentations are mainly placed on terracotta plaques set into the walls. The walls of the temple are decorated with scenes from the Ramayana, Anantasayin Vishnu and widely recurring figures of Radha-Krishna.

Currently the temple is preserved as one of the archeological monuments by the Archaeological Survey of India. Since 1998, the Radha Shyam temple is on the UNESCO World Heritage Site's Tentative list.

== Gallery ==
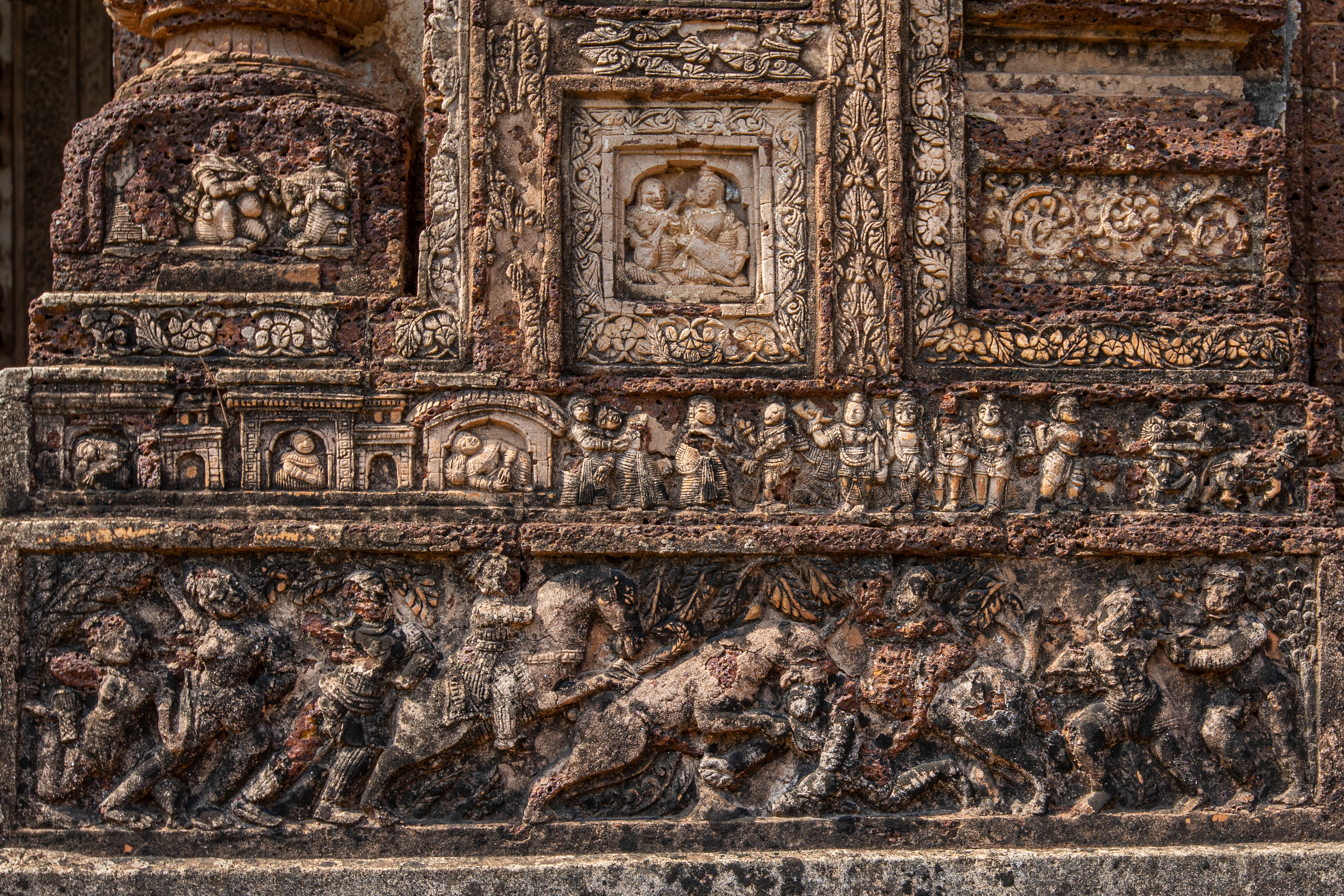

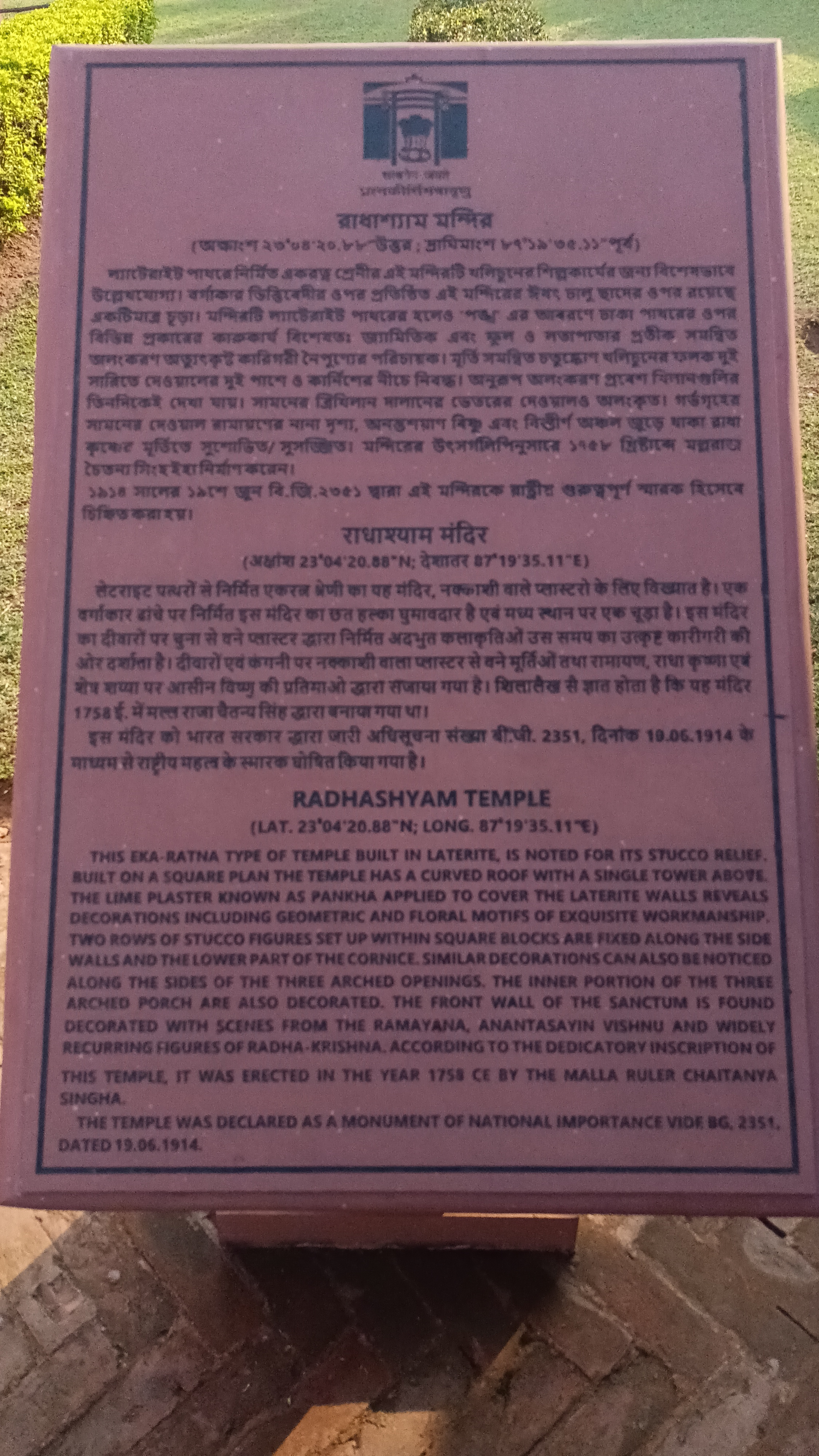

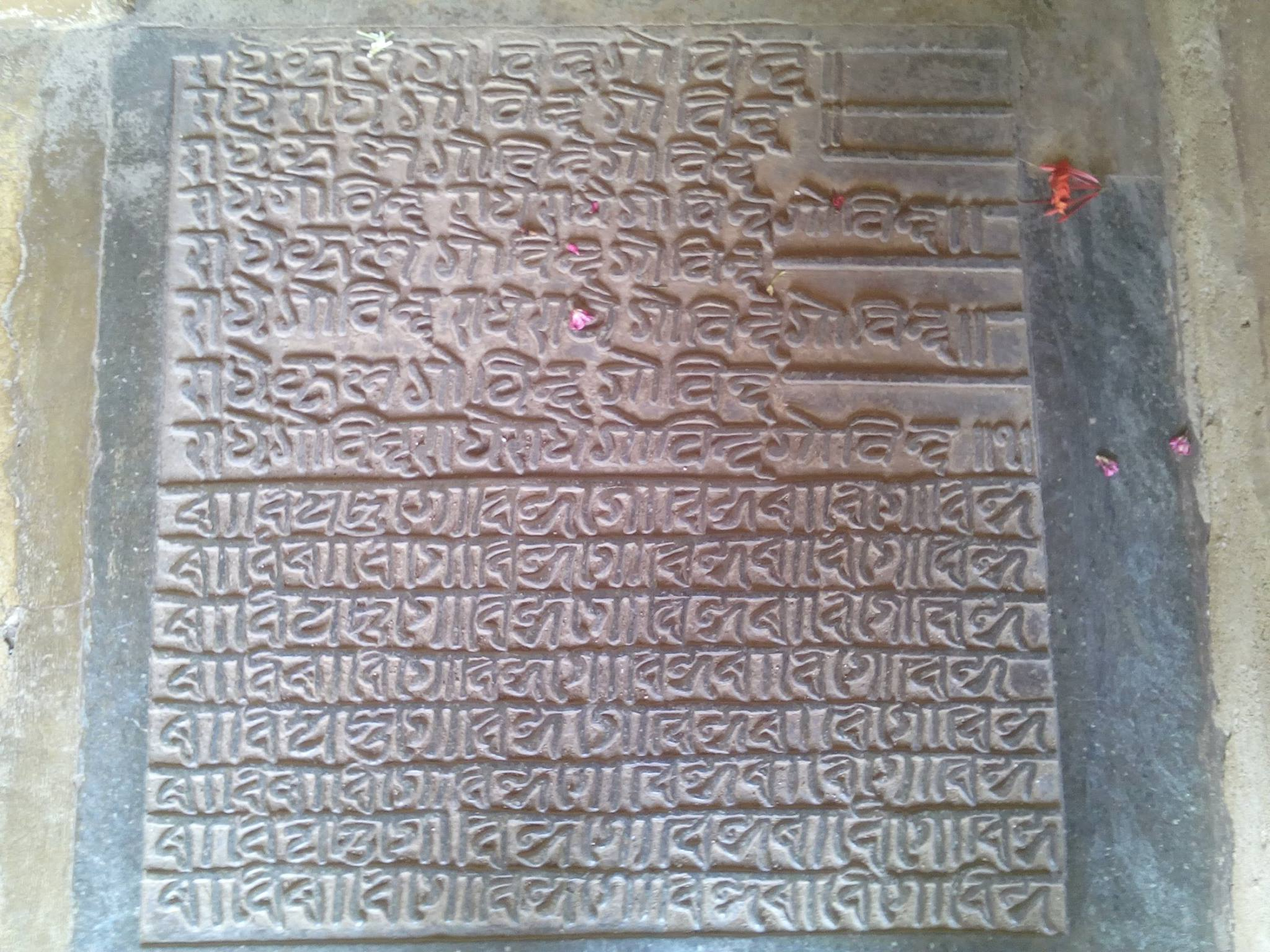

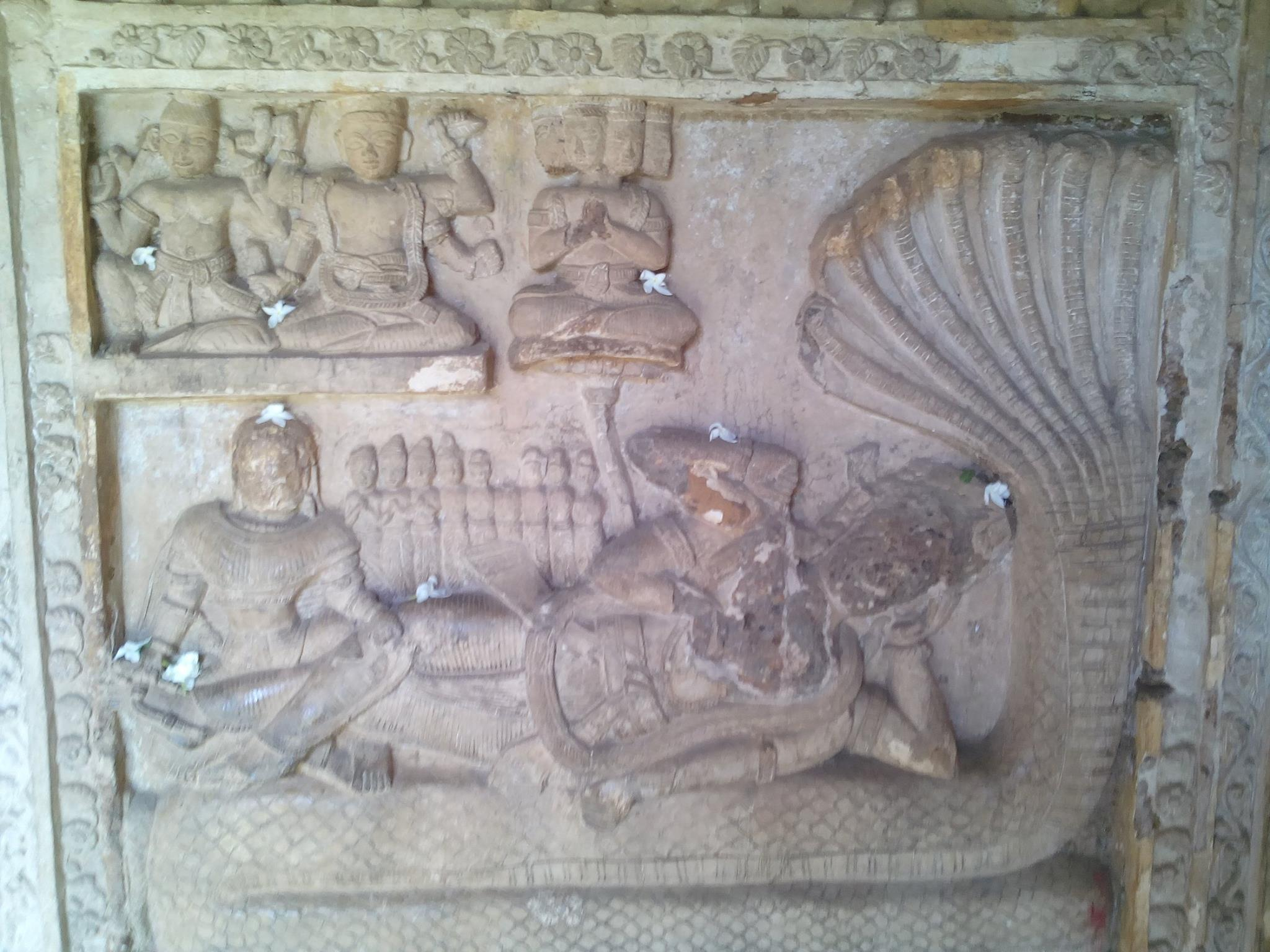

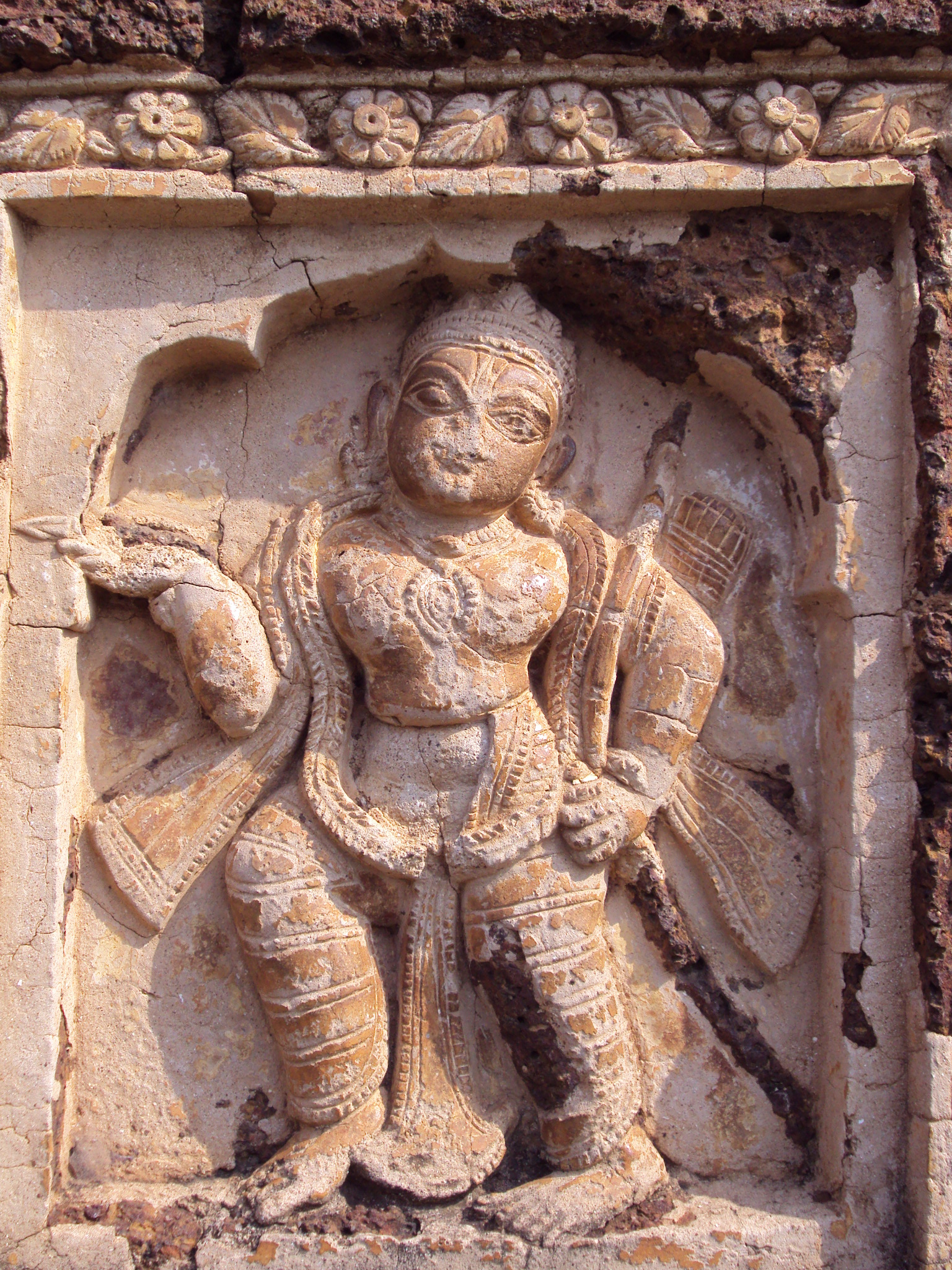

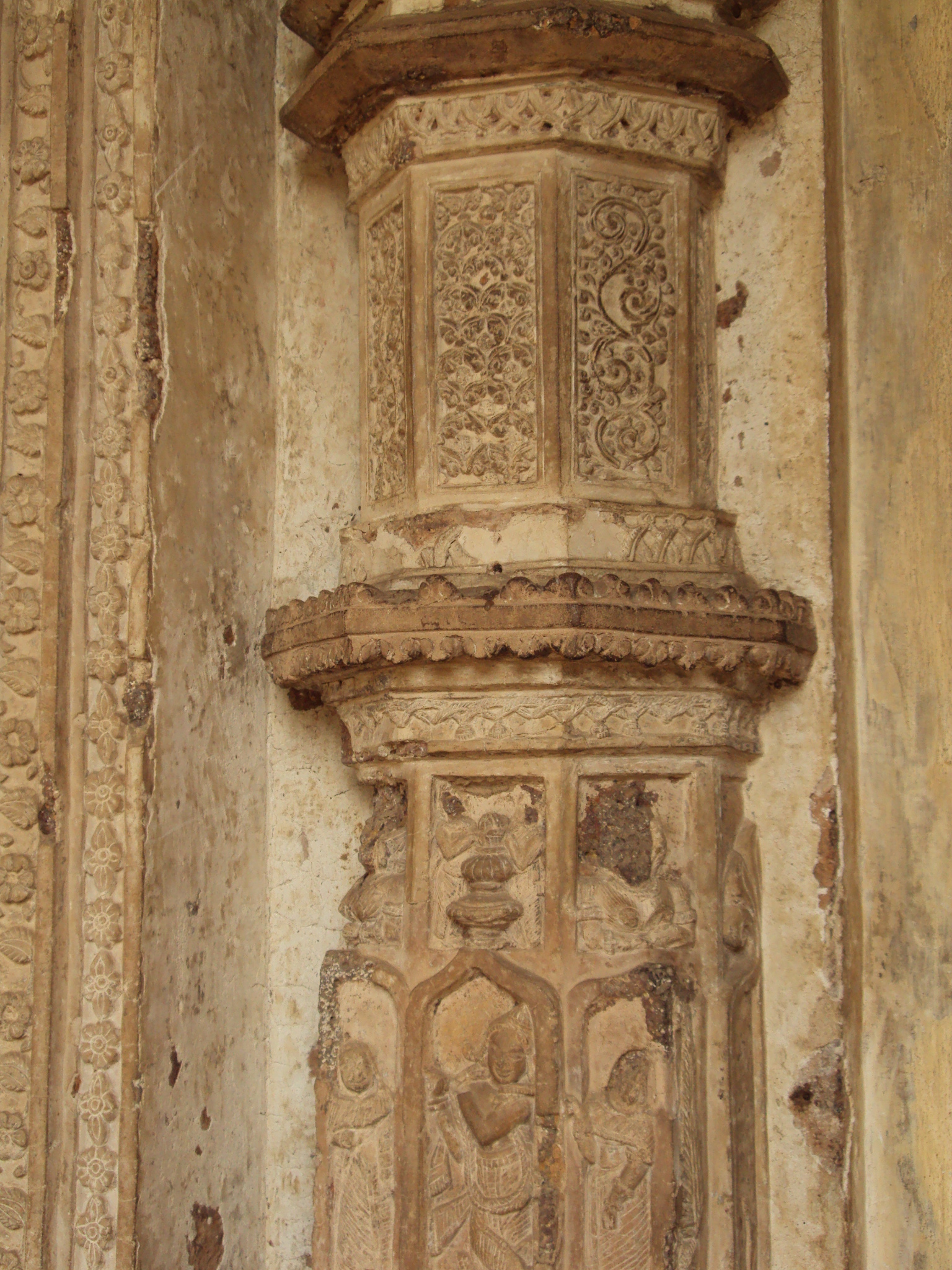

== Bibliography ==
- Biswas, S. S. (1992). "The Temples". Bishnupur (2nd ed.). New Delhi: Archaeological Survey of India.
- Ghosh, Pika (2005). Temple to Love: Architecture and Devotion in Seventeenth-Century Bengal. Bloomington and Indianapolis: Indiana University Press.
- Bandyopadhyay, Amiya Kumar (1971). Bām̐kuṛā jēlāra purākīrti বাঁকুড়া জেলার পুরাকীর্তি [Antiquities of Bankura District]. Kolkata: Public Works Department, West Bengal.
