= Raghunath Singha Dev II =

54th king of the Mallabhum
- Reign: 1702–1712
- Predecessor: Durjan Singha Dev
- Successor: Gopal Singha Dev
- Wives: Chandraprava
- Father: Durjan Singha Dev
- Religion: Hinduism

Raghunath Singha Dev II (also known as Raghunath Singh Deo II) was the fifty-fourth king of the Mallabhum. He ruled from 1702 to 1712.

== History ==
=== Personal life ===
Raghunath Singha Dev II and his wife Princess Chandraprava of Chetbarda had no children so his younger brother Gopal Singha Dev was the next king.

=== Mughals ===
Raghunath Singha Dev was the son of Durjan Singha Dev and a very brave king. He took care of his military force. He was also a very pious king and very much fond of music, dance and other performing arts. His time period. coincides the Aurangjeb and Bahadur Shah’s reign. During his rule Jijia tax(Jizya) was imposed.

=== Bishnupur gharana ===
During the time of Alamgir Aurangjeb, who was very orthodox, as per his order any type of performing art was strictly prohibited. Ignoring his order Raghunath Singha Dev II developed Bishnupur as a very important place of performing art. He brought Ustad Bahadur Khan a descendant of Tansen in a monthly payment of rupees 500 and Pir Box. Gradually Bishnupur gave us several vocalists, instrumentalists and other performing artists. A new gharana of classical music named as Bishnupur gharana developed.

=== Revolt ===
In his regime, Sobha Singha was Zamindar of Chetuwa — Baroda (Midnapur) rose in revolt against the Mughals. After the death of Sobha Singha, Raghunath married Chandraprava daughter of Shobha Singha.

=== Marathas ===
During the ending phase of his reign Maratha (Bargi) raiders raided Bishnupur marking the start of Bishnupur's decline.

== In popular culture ==
The dhrupad gharana of Bishnupur kingdom

=== Film ===
- Eastern Zonal Cultural Centre, Kolkata, brings you the Fourth Documentary from 𝗢𝗻𝗹𝗶𝗻𝗲 𝗔𝗿𝗰𝗵𝗶𝘃𝗲 𝗗𝗼𝗰𝘂𝗺𝗲𝗻𝘁𝗮𝗿𝘆 𝗙𝗶𝗹𝗺 𝗙𝗲𝘀𝘁𝗶𝘃𝗮𝗹. The video is a presentation on the dhrupad gharana of Bishnupur kingdom.

== Sources ==
- Dasgupta, Gautam Kumar; Biswas, Samira; Mallik, Rabiranjan (2009), Heritage Tourism: An Anthropological Journey to Bishnupur, A Mittal Publication, p. 20, ISBN 978-8183242943
- O’Malley, L.S.S., ICS, Bankura, Bengal District Gazetteers, pp. 21-46(26), 1995 reprint, first published 1908, Government of West Bengal.
