= Gopal Singha Dev I =

55th king of the Mallabhum
- Reign: 1712–1748
- Predecessor: Raghunath Singha Dev II
- Successor: Chaitanya Singha Dev
- Issue: Krishna Singha Dev II
- Father: Durjan Singha Dev
- Religion: Hinduism

Gopal Singha Dev I was the fifty-fifth Raja of Mallabhum. He ruled from 1712 to 1748.

== Midnapore Raj ==
The Rajas of Mallabhum were an independent kingdom, not subject to the authority of the Nawabs. In 1747, King Gopal Singh Malla of Mallabhum launched an attack on Karnagarh. However, with the blessings of Mahamaya, Jasomanta Singh led the forces of Karnagarh to a victorious defeat of Mallabhum's army. This victory played a key role in securing Karnagarh's sovereignty and reinforcing its strength in the region.

== Krishnamangal Kavy ==
Gopal Singh authored the ambitious Krishnamangal Kavy. The Malla rulers contributed to the dissemination of Vaishnava literature by personally copying local poetry collections and translating key Vaishnava texts into Bengali, making them accessible to the growing Vaishnava community they supported. Gopal Singh, for instance, transcribed the central Gaudiya Vaishnava text, the Chaitanya Charitamrita. Many of these manuscripts, adorned with finely painted wooden covers, are preserved in the Vishnupur Sahitya Parishad. As a result, Vishnupur became a significant hub for poetry, playing a crucial role in preserving and promoting the theological principles and unique rituals of the movement that had flourished in Vrindavan.

== Transformation of Mallabhum ==
The transformation of the Malla-ruled territory into Vishnupur, a center dedicated to Vishnu and Krishna, was facilitated through the systematic renaming and consecration of the region. Villages surrounding the capital were incorporated into this sacred landscape, known as "Brajamandala," and given names such as Gokulnagar, Yadavanagar, and Vasudevpur. This process mirrored similar symbolic incorporations seen in places like Benares, where major pilgrimage sites were integrated to establish a broader religious center.

== Mallabhum temples ==
=== Jor Mandir Group of Temples ===
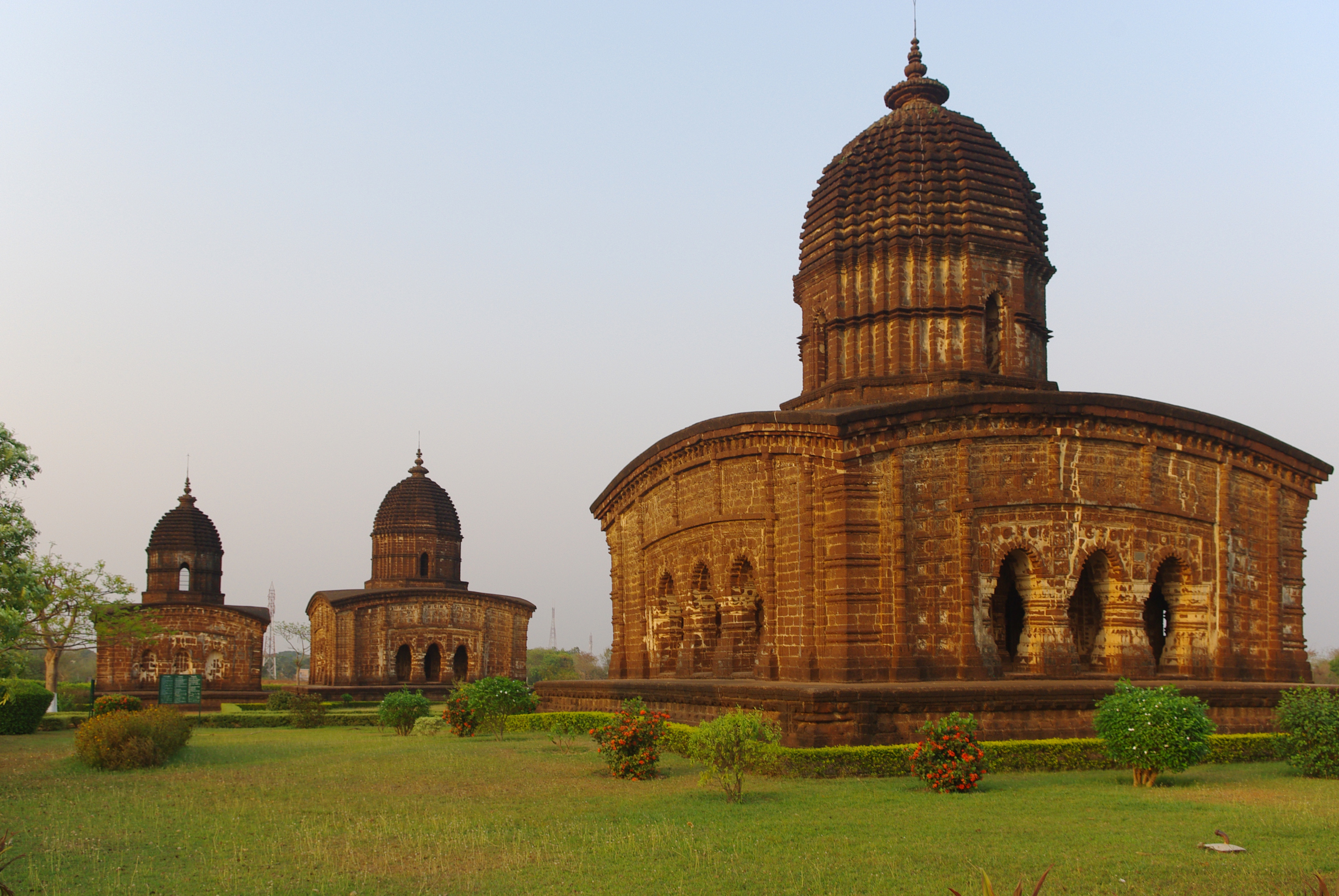

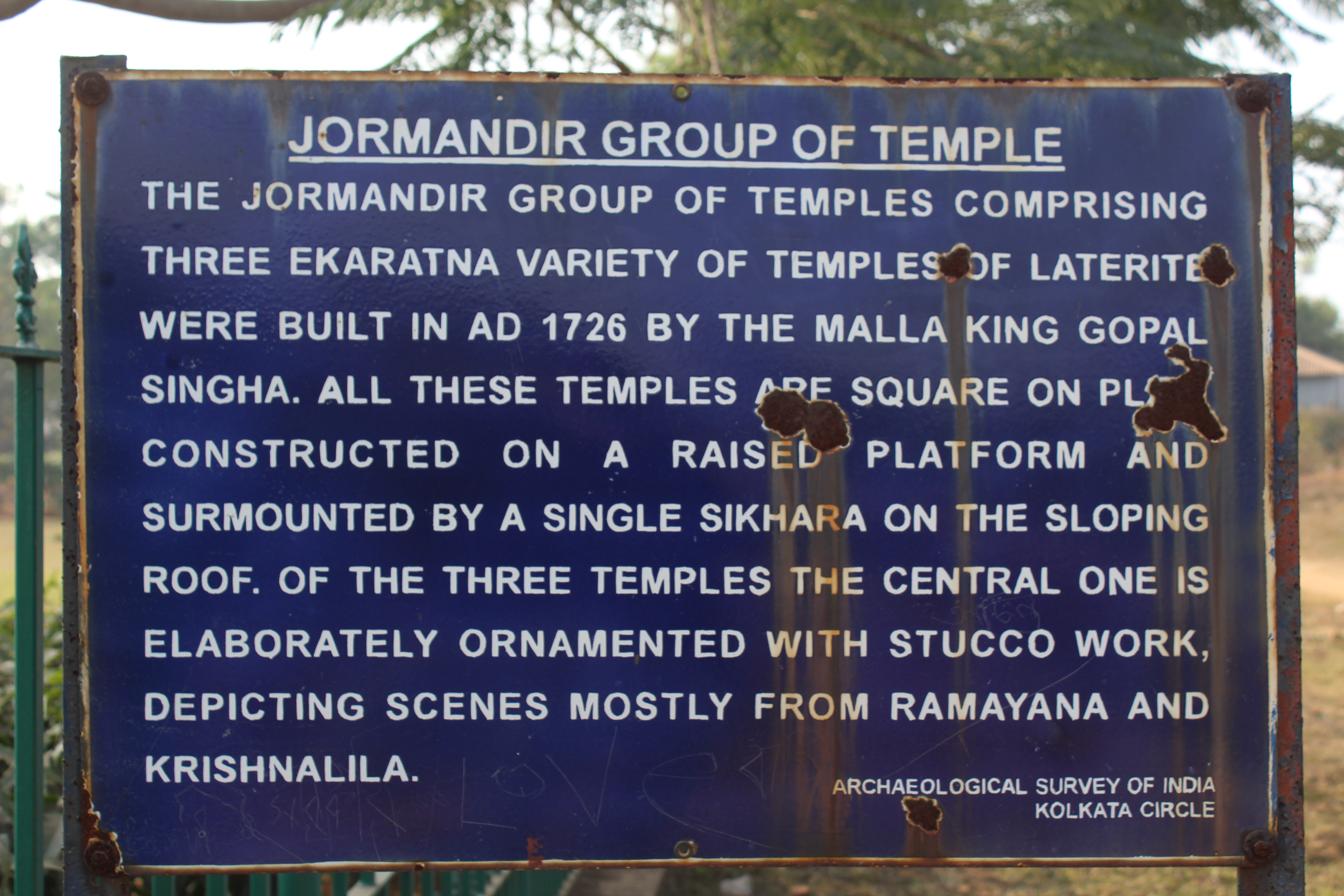

In 1726 Gopal Singha Dev established a complex consisting of one small and two big temples known as the Jor Mandir Group of Temples. The temple situated in the north-western corner has an idol of Narayana. The temple standing in the center is extensively decorated.
