= Chaitanya Singha Dev =

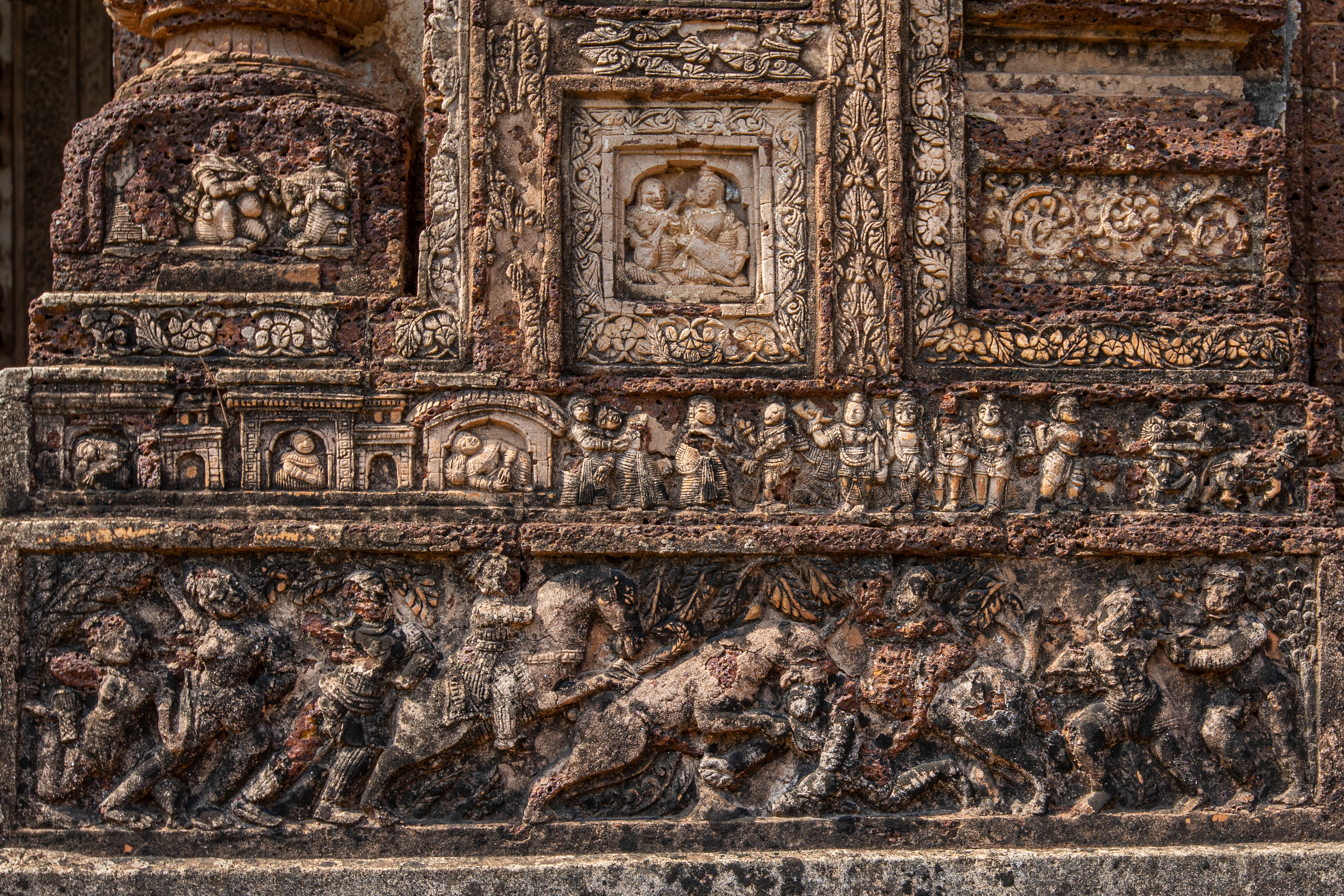

56th king of the Mallabhum
- Reign: 1748–1801
- Predecessor: Gopal Singha Dev
- Successor: Madhav Singha Dev
- Issue: Nimai Singha Dev, 2nd son
- Religion: Hinduism

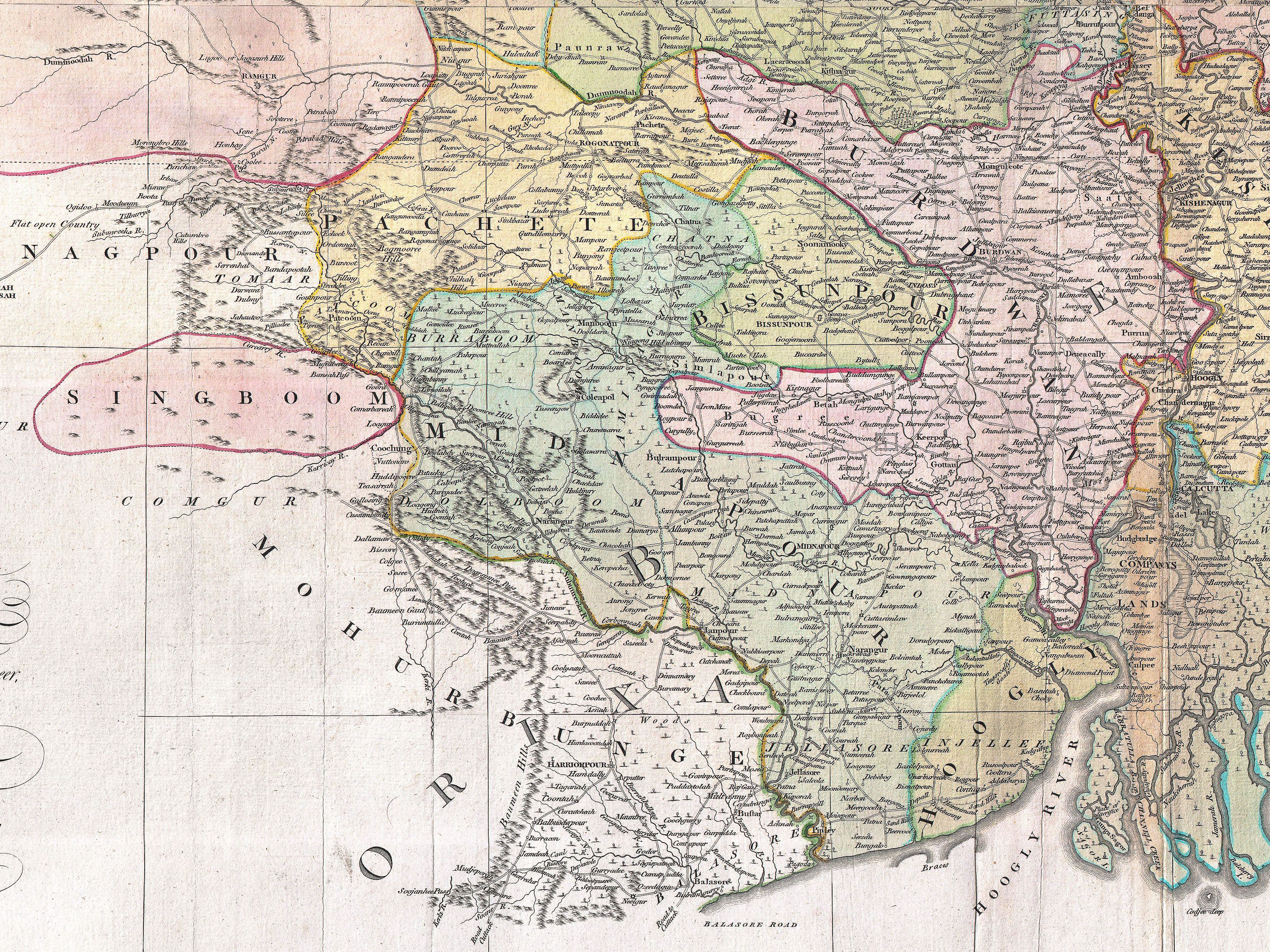
Bishnupur Estate on James Rennell's 1776 map.

Chaitanya Singha Dev also known as Chaitanya Singha or Chaitan Singh was the fifty-sixth king of the Mallabhum, a kingdom in India. He ruled from 1748 to 1801. He was succeeded by Madhav Singha Dev.

== The Great Famine and the Decline of Bishnupur ==
Around 1770-71, as the "Great Famine" swept through the region, the southwestern highlands of Bengal turned into a land of the dead. The greatest threat to the British East India Company was depopulation, which, despite the famine, led them to continuously pressure the now-weakened Raja of Bishnupur, Chaitanya Singha (referred to as Bishenpore by Hunter). In Bishnupur, hundreds of villages were completely abandoned, and even in larger towns, fewer than one-fourth of the houses remained occupied. Purnia and Bishnupur were the two districts in Bengal that suffered the most.

The Company's revenue receipts plummeted from over £1.5 million in 1768-69 to just £65,355 in 1770, despite the demand remaining high, leaving vast lands uncultivated even after a good harvest in 1771.By 1772, Warren Hastings estimated that one-third of the population had perished.

== Tax-Free Land Grants and Literary Patronage ==
During the reign of Chaitanya Singh, the Malla Rajas extensively granted rent-free lands to Goswamis, both individually and to the institutions they established, such as matts and akharas. These land grants supported religious and scholarly activities, fostering the growth of Vaishnavism in the region.

The rulers actively promoted Sanskrit and Bengali literature, offering brahmottar (tax-free land grants) as rewards to distinguished Sanskrit scholars. This period saw the composition of numerous Vaishnava texts in Sanskrit, with some being translated into Bengali. Many of these manuscripts were preserved with wooden covers, known as pata, which were often adorned with intricate miniature paintings.

== Revolt and Unrest (1799–1800) ==
Between 1799 and 1800, significant unrest arose due to the East India Company's auctioning of estates for revenue arrears. In Bishnupur, the family of Raja Chaitan Singh faced dispossession of their zamindari. The Bhumij community, hailing from Barabhum, Manbhum, and the surrounding jungle Mahals, rallied in the thousands to support the restoration of the family's landholdings.

The unrest gained momentum when the Ghatwals, responsible for maintaining local order and security, became discontented with government policies. Their grievances further fueled the resistance, contributing to widespread agitation across the region. These events reflect the deep-seated opposition to colonial revenue practices and the efforts of local communities to defend traditional systems of landownership.

== Temple ==
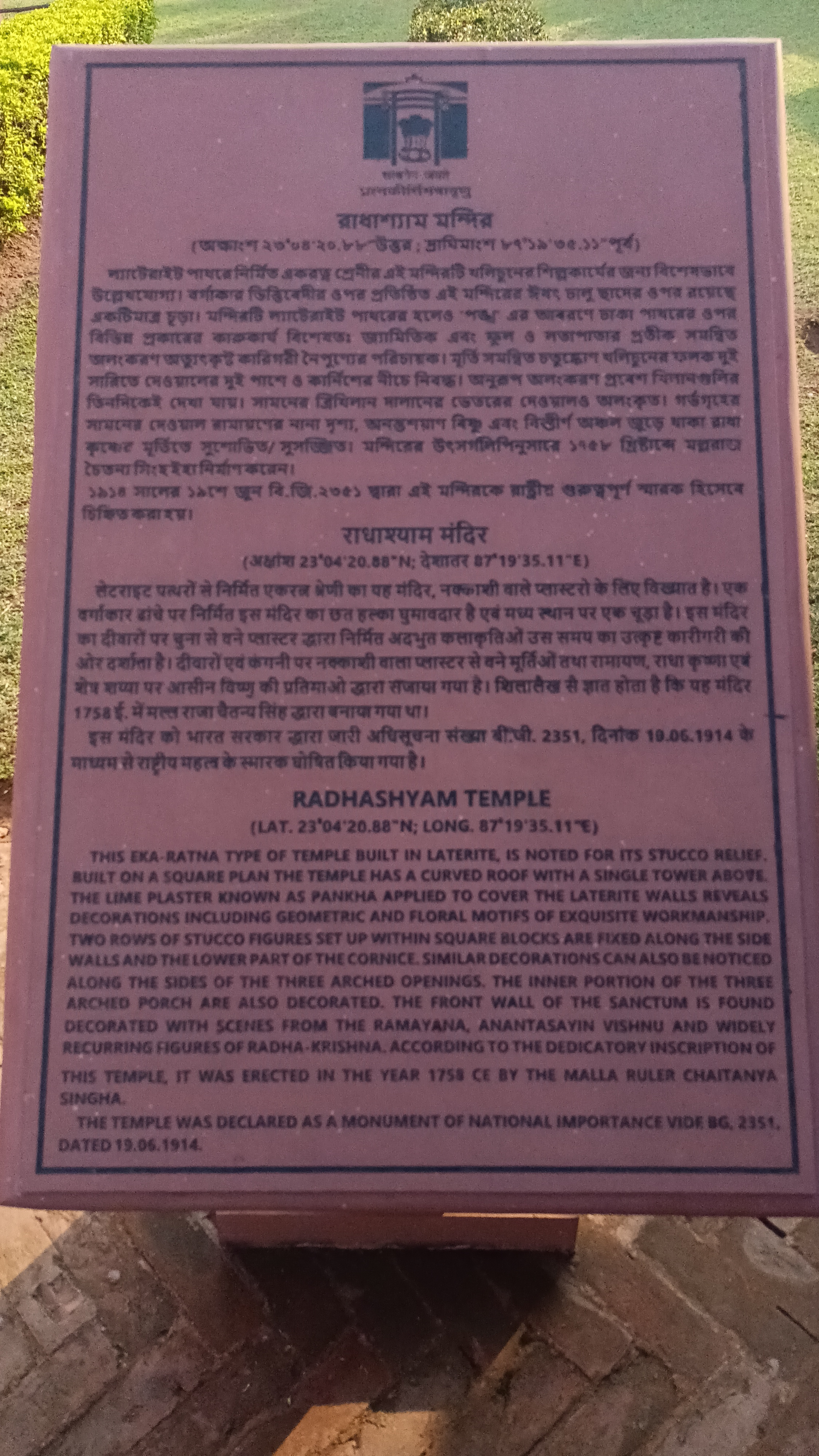
Radha Shyam Temple, built in 1758 by King Chaitanya Singha of Mallabhum.

Radha Shyam Temple, built in 1758 by King Chaitanya Singha of Mallabhum, is now preserved by the Archaeological Survey of India. Since 1998, it has been on UNESCO's Tentative List for World Heritage Sites.

== Bibliography ==
- Biswas, S. S. (1992). "The Temples". Bishnupur (2nd ed.). New Delhi: Archaeological Survey of India.
