= Durjan Singha Dev =

53rd king of the Mallabhum
- Reign: 1682 – 1702.
- Predecessor: Bir Singha Dev
- Successor: Raghunath Singha Dev II
- Issue: Raghunath Singha Dev II; Gopal Singha Dev
- Father: Bir Singha Dev
- Mother: Siromoni Devi(Churamoni)
- Religion: Hinduism

Durjan Singha Dev was the fifty-third king of the Mallabhum. He ruled from 1682 to 1702.

== History ==
=== Personal life ===
Durjan Singha Dev, the son of Bir Singha Dev, was the opposite of his father. He was not at all cruel; on the contrary, he had a very gentle, polite character. He was logical, kind hearted and also pious. He established Madan Mohan temple. During his period several Portuguese, French, British traders came to this place. He was on the one hand a Vaishnava devotee and on the other hand a great warrior.

== Mallabhum Temples ==
=== Madanmohan Temple ===
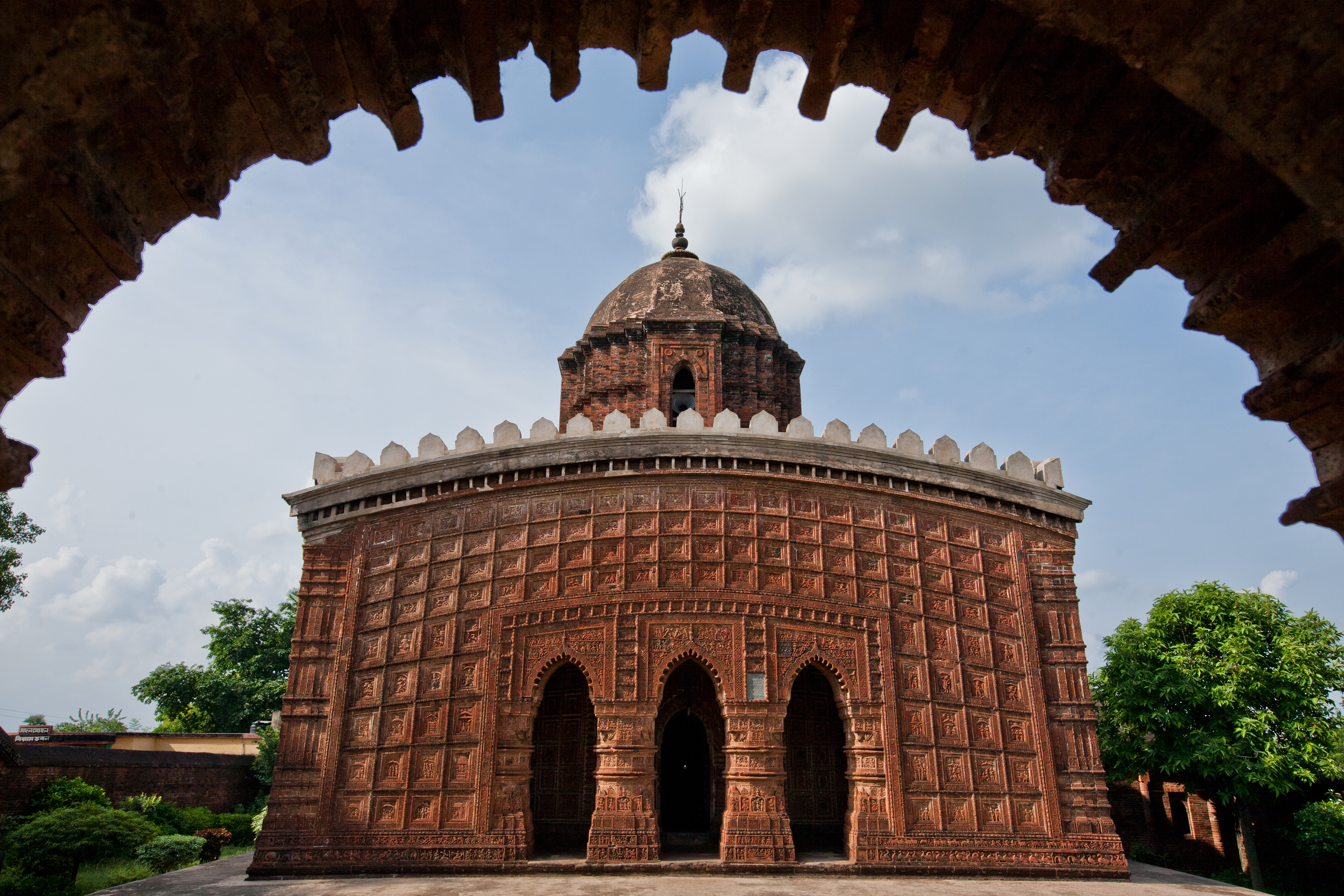

Madanmohan Temple built by King Durjan Singha Deva in 1694 the temple in the ekaratna style, a square flat-roofed building with carved cornices, surmounted by a pinnacle.

Madanmohan Temple

== Sources ==
- Dasgupta, Samira; Biswas, Rabiranjan; Mallik, Gautam Kumar (2009), Heritage Tourism: An Anthropological Journey to Bishnupur, A Mittal Publication, ISBN 978-8183242943
