= Madanamohana =

Epithet of Krishna

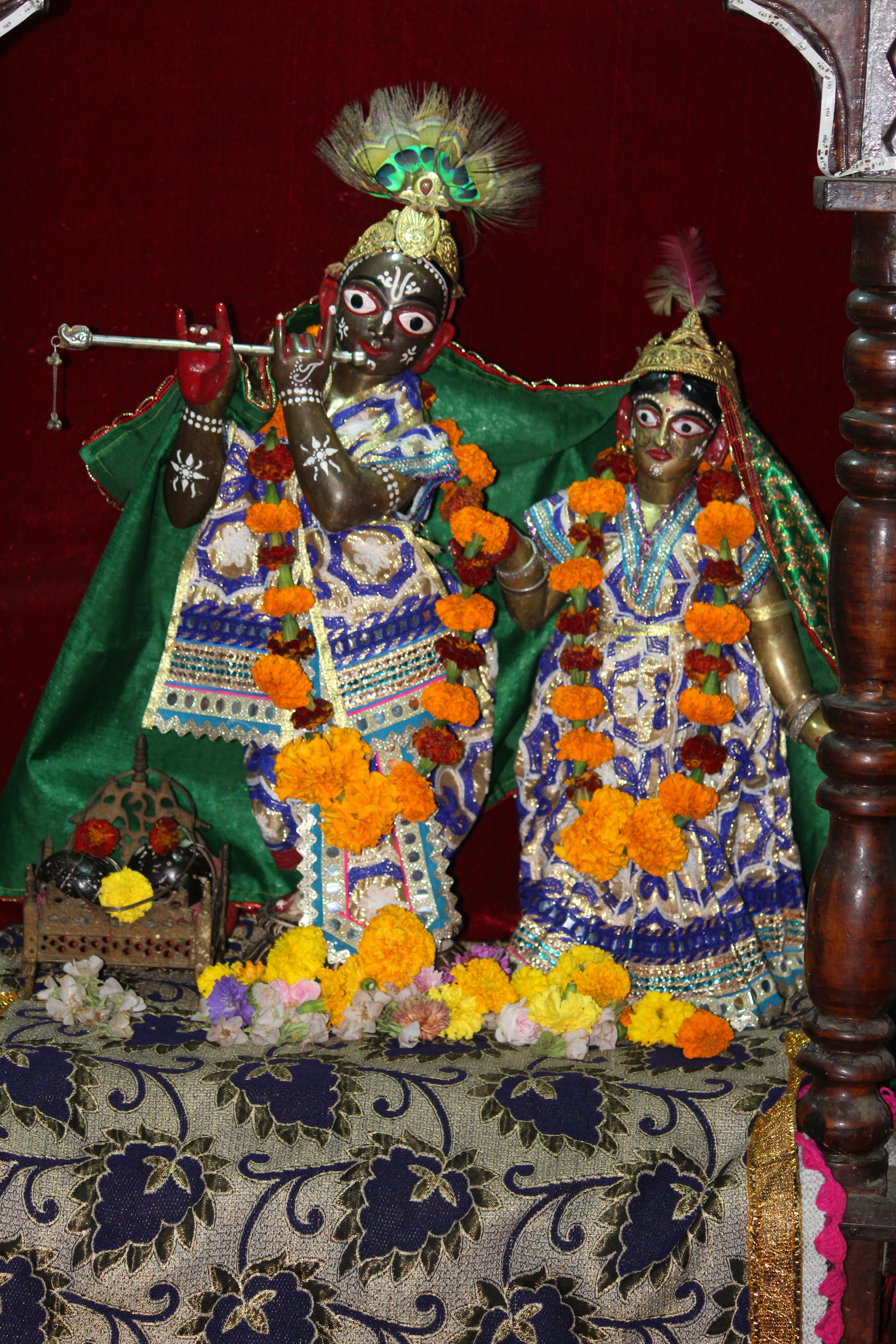
Murti of Krishna as Madana Mohana with his consort Radha, Madana Mohana Temple, Bishnupur

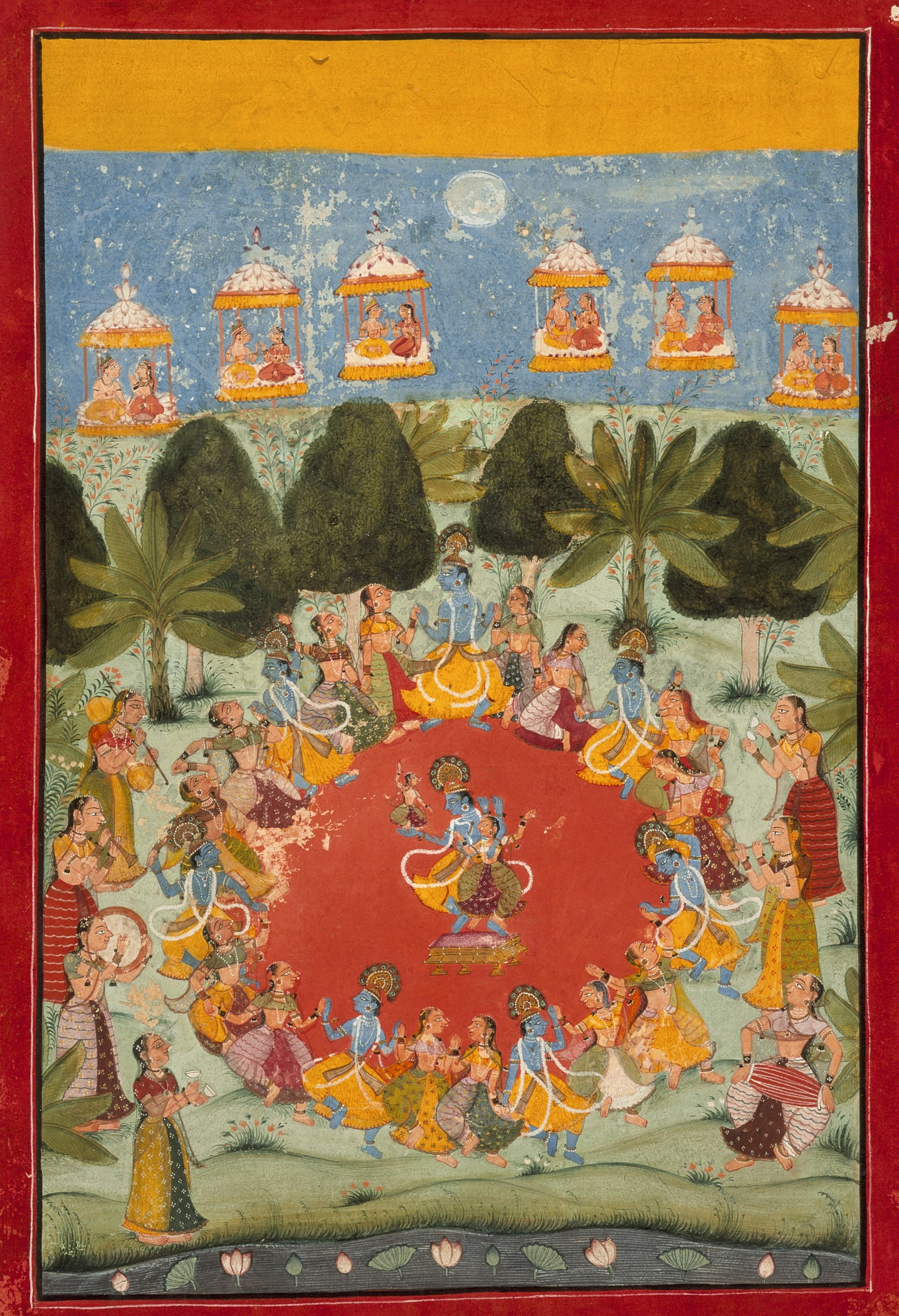
The rasalila of Krishna, surrounded by the gopis.

Madanamohana (Sanskrit: मदनमोहन, romanized: Madanamohana) is an epithet of the Hindu deity Krishna. It translates as, "he whose charm (mohana) bewilders even the god of love (madana)". The epithet describes the powerful nature of the attraction for the deity from his devotees, exemplified by the legend of the rasalila, where the gopis (cowherdesses) of the region Vraja abandon all their obligations to answer the call of Krishna. The epithet is also identified with the form of the deity worshipped by Sanatana Goswami of the Gaudiya tradition at Vrindavan.

== See also ==
- Keshava
- Govinda
- Gopala Krishna
