= History of West Bengal =

The history of West Bengal basically refers to the history of the western part of Bengal, located in the eastern part of the Indian subcontinent. Evidence of human settlement has been found in West Bengal about 42,000 years ago. The presence of human settlement of that period has been found in the Ayodhya Hills of West Bengal. By 2,000 BCE, settled life had increasingly spread of human civilization in the Damodar-Ajay River Valley, which was contemporary with the Harappa-Mahenjodaro civilization. The southern part of West Bengal witnessed the presence of the Vanga kingdom between 1100 BCE and 350 BCE, which was contemporary with the Vedic civilization of northern India.

Among the Mahajanapadas, Magadha became powerful around 350 BCE, at that time rulers of the Nanda dynasty of Magadha incorporated the territory of West Bengal into their empire. West Bengal was under the rule of all Magadha-centric empires after the Nanda Empire. Tamralipta in West Bengal was the main seaport of the Magadha-centered Maurya Empire. Most of the West Bengal's territory was ruled under the Gupta Empire, that arose in northern India after the collapse of the Magadha-centric empires.

In Bengal, the Gaur kingdom was established in 690 AD, which spread across West Bengal and present-day Bangladesh. Gaur is often referred to as the first well-established independent political entity in Bengal. After this kingdom, the Pala empire in 750 AD and the Sena empire in 1070 AD respectively emerged across West Bengal. Both of these empires were mainly Bengal-centric.

Islamic conquests were established in West Bengal as early as the 13th century. At this time Bengal along with West Bengal was included in the Ghaznavid empire. West Bengal was ruled under the Delhi Sultanate from the 13th to the 14th century and the Bengal Sultanate from the 14th to the 16th century. In the 16th century, after the fall of the Bengal Sultanate, West Bengal came under the Mughal Empire.

Murshidabad in West Bengal was the capital of independent Nawab Bengal (1717–1765). In 1765, the British took over the control of Bengal including West Bengal from the Nawabs of Bengal. The Bengal Presidency of the British Indian Empire was divided into West Bengal and East Bengal in August 1947; West Bengal was included in the Dominion of India and gained independence as an Indian state.

== Prehistoric era (until c. 2000 BCE) ==
=== Stone Age ===
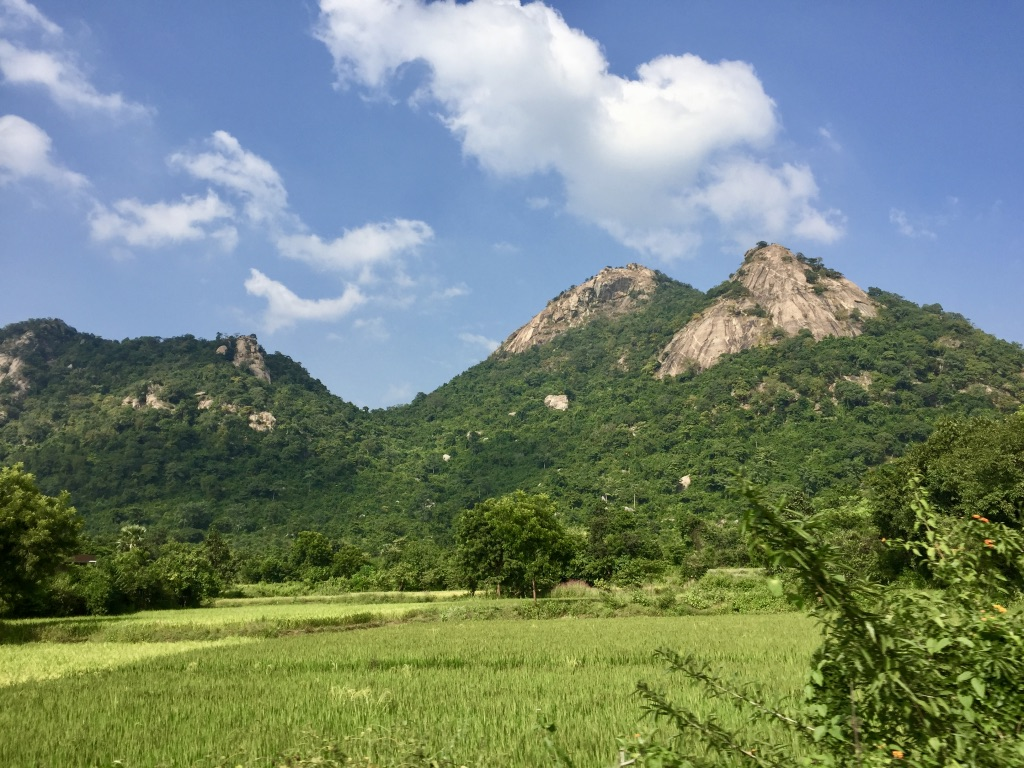
Ayodha Hills

The time from West Bengal's first inhabitation until the Old Stone Age, or Palaeolithic era. Palaeolithic sites are mostly found in the upper Gandeshwari, Middle Dwarakeswar, Upper Kangsabati, Upper Tarafeni and Middle Subarnarekha valleys between 87°10' E and 22°30' N - 23°30' N. The extensive forest-covered high land and moderate rainfall of the southwestern part of West Bengal provided ideal conditions for the growth and development of the Paleolithic culture. Evidence of 42,000 years old human habitation has been found in West Bengal. These human settlements have been discovered at Kana and Mahadebbera at the foothills of the Ajodhya Hills. Microlithic tools found at Kana are 42,000 years old, while microlithic tools found at Mahadevera are 34,000 to 25,000 years old. Hatpara on the west bank of Bhagirathi River has evidence of human settlements dating back to around 15,000-20,000 years. About 200 small stone weapons have been found here. Grains and fish bones were also found here. According to archaeologists, the prehistoric civilization of Hatpara was spread along the banks of the Bhagirathi from Ganakar to Mahipala. Fish was a common part of the human diet of the time, and coppery color of the fish bones found at the site indicates that the Burnt fish was eaten.

The western plateau and delta region or the present flood plain area are the two biological regions of West Bengal where Mesolithic sites identified. The microlithic industry of West Bengal was mostly a non-geometric industry. Blades, points, scrapers, lunettes, burins, borers, flakes, and cores are the most common tools used throughout this period. Evidence from this period is scarce.

The Neolithic culture took place in five major river valleys, namely Ajay-Mayurakshi river valley, Dwarakeswar-Damodar river valley, Gandheswari river valley, Tarafeni river valley and Subarnarekha river valley. Also a Neolithic culture developed in Kalimpong. The main tool types recovered from the site include celts (both axes and adzes), wedges, chisels, perforated tools and pounders, along with microliths and bone tools.

== Copper Age (c. 1500 – c. 600 BCE) ==
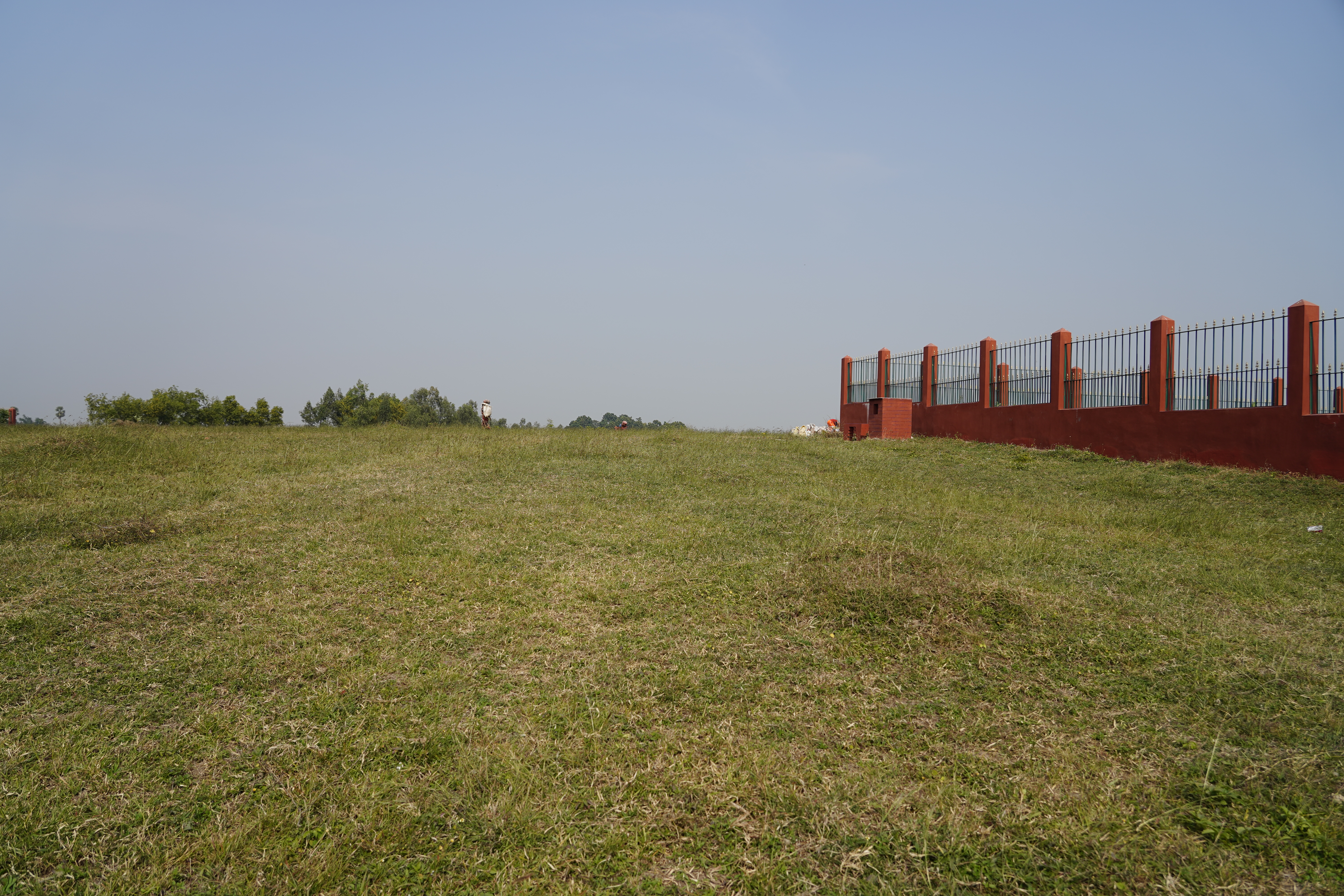
Pandu Rajar Dhibi, Chalcolithic period around c. 1500 BCE–750 BCE

The Copper Age or Chalcolithic began around 1500 BCE with the appearance of Copper objects. Chalcolithic culture of West Bengal is contemporary with Later Harappan (Harappan 5) and Vedic civilization.

A Chalcolithic culture flourished in Ajay-Damodar valley. The Chalcolithic culture flourished from about between 1500 and 600 BCE. The culture included cities such as Pandu Rajar Dhibi, Mangalkot and Bharatpur in modern-day Burdwan division, and Dihar in modern-day Medinipur division. Chalcolithic site Pandu Rajar Dhibi on the south bank of Ajay River, where spiral bangles, rings and fish-hook have been found. In the West Bengal, Black and red ware (BRW) is a Copper Age and early Iron Age archaeological culture of Central and Eastern Ganges plain, until c. 700–500 BCE, when it is succeeded by the Northern Black Polished Ware culture.

== Iron Age (c. 1000 – 28 BCE) ==
The Iron Age saw the development of coinage, metal weapons, agriculture and irrigation. Many sites in West Bengal were transformed from the Chalcolithic to the Iron Age. Iron Age archaeological sites have been discovered in the western-southwestern part of West Bengal. The Iron Age archaeological culture of West Bengal was the Northern Black Polished Ware. The north-western and western part of Birbhum (Bahiri), western part of Medinipur (Kankrajhor, Dhuliapur), Purulia and Bankura (Tulsipur, Kumardanga) regions of modern-day West Bengal served as major producers of iron.

According to the Indian epic Mahabharata, the western part of Vanga kingdom was located in West Bengal. Vanga was described as a thalassocracy with colonies in Southeast Asia. According to Sri Lankan history, the first king of Sri Lanka was Prince Vijaya who led a fleet from India to conquer the island of Lanka. Prince Vijaya's ancestral home was West Bengal.

=== Ancient geopolitical divisions ===
A number of geopolitical divisions are observed in ancient Bengal, some of which were located in the territory of modern West Bengal. The regions of geopolitical division have expanded and receded over the centuries. The geopolitical divisions established in the territory of West Bengal were Pundravardhana, Vanga, Suhma and Radha. The western part of Pundravardhan belonged to the modern-day Malda division, and The western part of Vanga belonged to the modern-day Presidency division and Medinipur division of West Bengal. The whole of Suhma belonged to the modern-day Burdwan division, Medinipur division and Presidency division, and Radha was probably situated in modern-day West Bengal.

=== West Bengal under empires ===
During the Iron Age of Bengal, West Bengal was under the Magadha-centric empires. Greek accounts mention the contemporary Gangaridai of Bengal separately, located in modern-day West Bengal and Bangladesh, although indicating that the two were ruled by common sovereigns. Historian Hem Chandra Raychaudhuri theorizes that the Nandas exercised centralized control over their core territories in present-day Bihar and Uttar Pradesh, but allowed considerable autonomy in the frontier parts of their empire.

Ruins of Iron Age cities in West Bengal

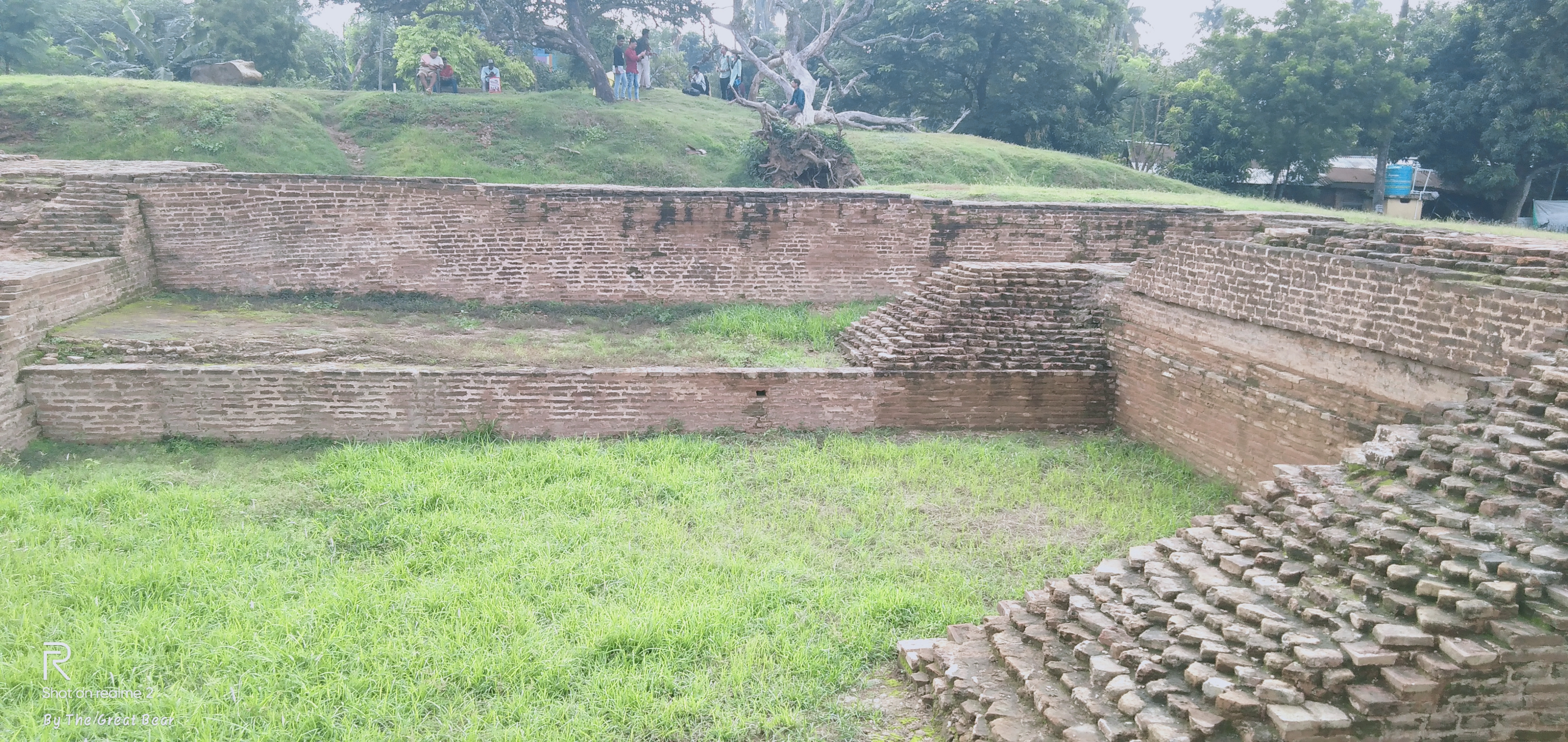
Khana-Mihirer Dhipi in Chandraketugarh

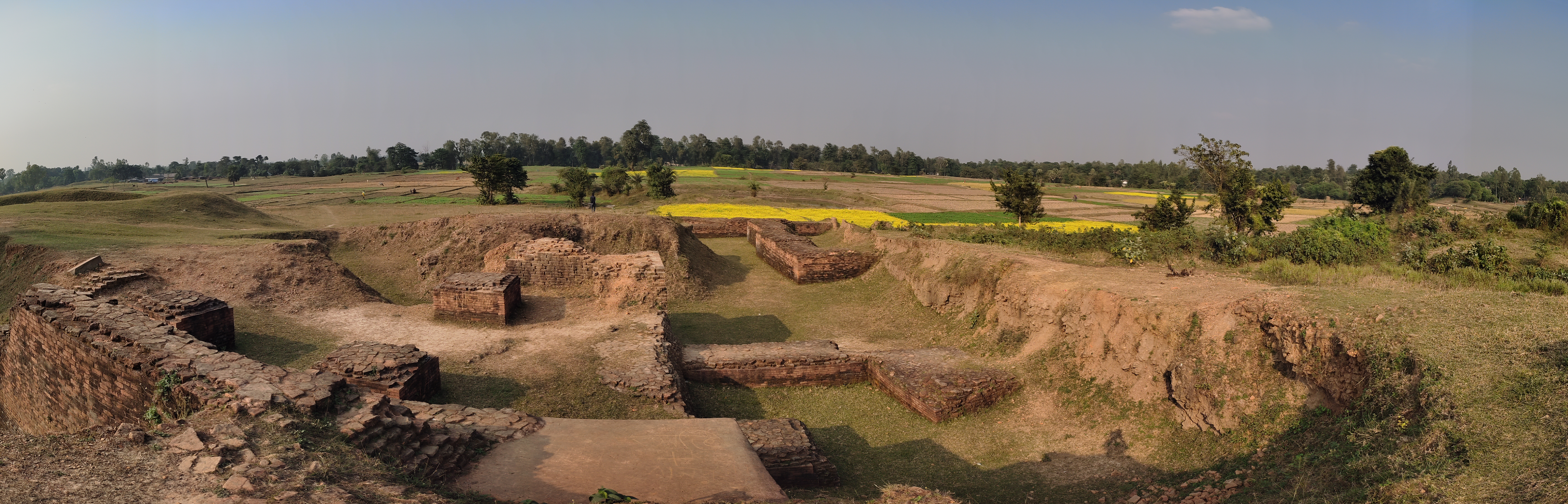
Archaeological remains of brick structures at Bangarh

Bangarh on the bank of the Punarbhaba, about 400 km from Kolkata, have evidence of the early history of West Bengal from the Maurya period to the Pala period. Iron Age of West Bengal artefacts have been discovered here, which belong to the Pre-Maurya, Maurya and Sunga periods. West Bengal provided sea routes to each of the Magadha empires. The empires conducted sea trade with foreign countries through the Tamralipta seaport, which was located near the modern-day Tamluk city. According to Darian, with the rise of the Maurya Empire, Tamralipti gained universal popularity as the main port of the entire basin. Ships from Ceylon, Southeast Asia, West India and the Middle East used to come to this port. Chandraketugarh was another port city, situated on the banks of the Bidyadhari River. Mauryan and Sunga period artifacts have been found here. Terracotta statues and chariots have been found.

== Modern era ==
=== British East India Company (1772–1858) ===
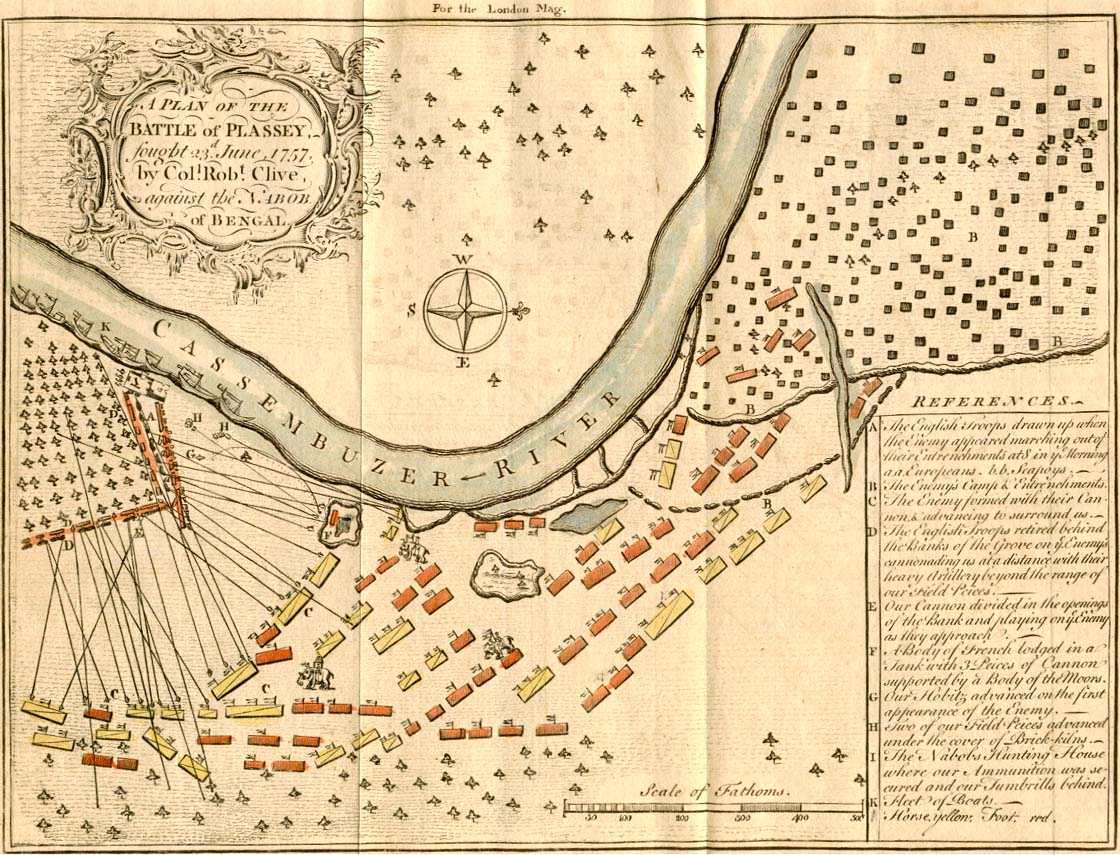
A plan for the Battle of Palashi, Colonel Robert Clive fought against the Nawab of Bengal on 23 June 1757. Illustration of the battlefield with explanation of troop movements.

The dramatic rise of the British East India Company took place in the territory of West Bengal. When the East India Company began strengthening the defenses of Fort William (Calcutta) in the mid-1750s, Nawab Siraj ud-Daulah attacked with French encouragement. Under the command of Robert Clive, British troops and their local allies captured Chandannagar in March 1757 and severely defeated the Nawab in the Battle of Plassey on 23 June 1757. In the seat of the Nawab of Bengal, the British appointed and administered the people of their choice, and extended their direct control to the south. The French regained control of Chandannagar on the Hooghly River in West Bengal in 1763.

Mir Qasim and Shuja-ud-Daula in alliance with the Mughal emperor Shah Alam II in 1765 tried to recover Bengal, but were again defeated in the Battle of Buxar (1765). As part of the Mughal Emperor's agreement with the British East India Company, the East India Company was given the right to collect taxes from the province. Thus, the company became the tax collector of the empire, while the local nawabs appointed by the Mughal emperor continued to rule the province. This system of local rule was abolished in 1772 and the East India Company took complete control of the province. During the fall of the Mughal Empire, the center of Indian culture and trade shifted from Delhi to Calcutta in West Bengal. Capital raised from Bengal by the East India Company in the early stages of the Industrial Revolution was invested in various industries in Great Britain such as textile manufacturing. Company policy led to the de-industrialization of the textile industry in Bengal during the Company's rule. De-industrialization led to the destruction of Bengal's textile industry. Murshidabad in West Bengal—one of Bengal's major textile centers—became economically weak, the city which Robert Clive described as a city richer than London at the time.

During Company rule, there was a devastating famine in 1770 that resulted in the deaths of an estimated 7 to 10 million people, which is known as the Chiẏāttôrer mônnôntôr. The present day states of West Bengal and Bihar were the worst affected by this famine. Among the regions of Greater Bengal, Central and North Bengal were the most prone to famine; these areas are part of present day Malda and Jalpaiguri divisions of West Bengal. The famine devastated the economy of the region.

India's second and Bengal's first railway was laid between the cities of Howrah and Hooghly in West Bengal. In 1854, rail service was started between Howrah and Hooghly railway stations in West Bengal. The first university of India and Bengal during British rule was established in West Bengal in 1857, known as University of Calcutta.

=== Independence ===
When India gained independence in 1947, Bengal was partitioned along religious lines. The western part went to India (and was named West Bengal) while the eastern part joined Pakistan as a province called East Bengal (later renamed East Pakistan, giving rise to independent Bangladesh in 1971).

== Bidhan Chadra Roy Era (1947–1962) ==
=== Princely state merger with West Bengal ===
In 1950, the Princely State of Koch Bihar merged with West Bengal after King Jagaddipendra Narayan had signed the Instrument of Accession with India. In 1955, the former French enclave of Chandannagar, which had passed into Indian control after 1950, was integrated into West Bengal. Portions of Bihar were subsequently merged with West Bengal.

During Roy's Chief Minister-ship very few manufacturing industries were set up in the state. In 1954, when Dr. B. C. Roy was the Congress chief minister, a massive food crisis overtook the state. There was a near-famine condition in Bengal.

== United Front (1967) ==
=== 1967 General Election ===
After the state legislative elections held in 1967, the CPI(M) was the main force behind the United Front government formed. The Chief Ministership was given to Ajoy Mukherjee of the Bangla Congress.

=== Naxalbari uprising ===
In 1967 a peasant uprising broke out in Naxalbari, in northern West Bengal. The insurgency was led by hardline district-level CPI(M) leaders Charu Majumdar and Kanu Sanyal. The Naxalbari movement was violently repressed by the West Bengal government. During the 1970s and 1980s, severe power shortages, strikes and a violent Marxist-Naxalite movement damaged much of the state's infrastructure, leading to a period of economic stagnation.

The Bangladesh Liberation War of 1971 resulted in the influx of millions of refugees to West Bengal, causing significant strains on its infrastructure. The 1974 smallpox epidemic killed thousands. West Bengal politics underwent a major change when the Left Front won the 1977 assembly election, defeating the incumbent Indian National Congress. The Left Front, led by Communist Party of India (Marxist), has governed for the state for the subsequent three decades.

=== Dismissal of United Front government ===
In November 1967, the West Bengal United Front government was dismissed by the central government. Initially the Indian National Congress formed a minority government led by Prafulla Chandra Ghosh, but that cabinet did not last long. Following the proclamation that the United Front government had been dislodged, a 48-hour hartal was effective throughout the state. After the fall of the Ghosh cabinet, the state was put under President's Rule.

=== 1969 Assembly election ===
Fresh elections were held in West Bengal in 1969. CPI(M) emerged as the largest party in the West Bengal legislative assembly. But with the active support of CPI and the Bangla Congress, Ajoy Mukherjee was returned as Chief Minister of the state. Mukherjee resigned on March 16, 1970 and the state was put under President's Rule.

== Shiddharthrasankar Ray Era (1972–1977) ==
Indian National Congress the 1972 assembly election, and its leader Siddhartha Shankar Ray became the chief minister. During this period, the then Prime Minister of India, Indira Gandhi proclaimed nationwide Emergency in 1975.

This period was marked by large scale violence as the police force battled with the naxalites and ultimately crushed the movement in the state.

== Left Front era ==
=== Jyoti Basu (1977–2000) ===
==== 1977 Election ====
In the 1977 election of the state legislature, the Left Front, headed by Communist Party of India (Marxist), won 243 seats thereby gaining a majority. The first Left Front government was established with Jyoti Basu as the Chief Minister.

===== Marichjhanpi Massacre, 1979 =====
The massacre in Marichjhanpi, which took place under CPI(M) rule in Bengal between January 26 and May 16, 1979, relates to the forcible eviction of refugees who had fled from East Pakistan thereby leading to the death of a sizable population among them.

Out of the 14,388 families who deserted [for West Bengal], 10,260 families returned to their previous places … and the remaining 4,128 families perished in transit, died of starvation, exhaustion, and many were killed in Kashipur, Kumirmari, and Marichjhapi by police firings (Biswas 1982, 19).

After leading the Left Front government for consecutive five terms, Jyoti Basu retired from active politics and Buddhadeb Bhattacharjee was appointed as his successor. Five years later, the Left Front came back to the power with Bhattacharjee again assuming the office of the Chief Minister.

=== Budhdhadev Bhattacharya (2000–2011) ===
The state's economic recovery gathered momentum after economic reforms in India were introduced in the early 1990s by the central government, aided by election of a new reformist Chief Minister Buddhadeb Bhattacharya in 2000. As of 2007, armed activists have been organizing terrorist attacks in some parts of the state, while clashes with the administration have taken place at several sensitive places on the issue of industrial land acquisition.

==== Nandigram violence ====
The Nandigram violence was an incident in Nandigram, West Bengal where, on the orders of the Left Front government, more than 4,000 heavily armed police stormed the Nandigram area with the aim of stamping out protests against the West Bengal government's plans to expropriate 10,000 acres (40 km^{2}) of land for a Special Economic Zone (SEZ) to be developed by the Indonesian-based Salim Group. The police shot dead at least 14 villagers and wounded 70 more.

The SEZ controversy started when the government of West Bengal decided that the Salim Group of Indonesia would set up a chemical hub under the SEZ policy at Nandigram, a rural area in the district of Purba Medinipur. The villagers took over the administration of the area and all the roads to the villages were cut off. A front-page story in the Kolkata newspaper, The Telegraph, on 4 January 2007 was headlined, "False alarm sparks clash". According to the newspaper that village council meeting at which the alleged land seizure was to be announced was actually a meeting to declare Nandigram a "clean village", that is, a village in which all the households had access to toilet facilities.

== Trinamool Congress era ==
In the 2011 West Bengal Legislative Assembly election, Left Front was defeated and Trinamool Congress won an absolute majority of seats. Mamata Banerjee, the leader of Trinamool Congress, became the chief minister. The success of Trinamool Congress was repeated in the 2013 Panchayat election (local government elections in rural areas, and some urban municipalities) and the 2014 Indian general election (in which Trinamool won 34 of 42 Lok Sabha constituencies in the state).
