= Pandu culture =

Archaeological culture in India

- Alternative names: Chalcolithic period in the lower Ganga valley
- Geographical range: Ajay Valley: modern-day West Bengal, India.
- Period: Chalcolithic
- Dates: 1600–750 BC
- Type site: Pandu Rajar Dhibi
- Major sites: Mahisdal, Mangalkot, Dihar, Baneshwardanga and Tamluk
- Preceded by: Early agricultural communities in Bengal
- Followed by: Northern Black Polished Ware culture

The Pandu culture is an archaeological culture from the Chalcolithic period of India, spanning around 1600 BC to 750 BC. The type site is Pandu Rajar Dhibi, where black and red ware and tools made from bone and copper were found alongside remains of human body. It extends from the foothills of the Chota Nagpur Plateau to the Bhāgirathi-Hooghly river basin, covering a considerable part of southwestern or Rarh and coastal regions of modern-day West Bengal; from Birbhum in the north to Purba Medinipur in the south.

Most of the Pandu settlements were small-scale, mainly concentrated in the Ajay, Damodar and Rupnarayan, Hooghly river valleys. Major settlements during the peak phase of this Chalcolithic culture (1000 BC) include Pandu Rajar Dhibi, Mahisdal, Mangalkot, Bharatpur, Dihar, Baneshwardanga, Pakhanna and Tamluk. These were contemporary with the later Harappan and Vedic period.

The Pandu culture was extensively dependent on agriculture. The presence of rice provides evidence of the beginning of rice cultivation and agriculture in eastern India and Bengal. From the late phase of Chalcolithic, iron began to be used. Clay floors, reed and clay structural remains, and pit-stocks have been documented from various settlements. Structural remains in the form of mud-rammed floor, reed impressed clay chunks, and pit-silos are recorded at several sites indicating wattle-and-daub structure.

These cultural settlements were weakened and destroyed when the Second Urbanization began, and new settlements and trade centers emerged in the delta region.

== Geography ==
The Pandu culture flourished in the present-day eastern Indian state of West Bengal, which is the western part of the historical Bengal region.

The culture thus spread in the lower Ganges valley, from the Bhagirathi-Hooghly River, one of the two main tributaries of the Ganges, in the east to the eastern fringes of the Chota Nagpur Plateau in the west. It was centered on the Mayurakshi, Ajay, Kunur, Damodar, Dwarakeswar and Rupnarayan river valleys, as well as extending south to the sea coast. Its historical center or core lay around the confluence of the Ajay and Kunur rivers, the area where most of the archaeological sites have been discovered. The valleys of the rivers originating from the Chotanagpur plateau and the Rajmahal hills where the culture flourished, had fertile farmland and availability of water, which created favorable conditions for agriculture in the region.

A total of 76 cultural sites have been identified, ranging from small villages to the ruins of large settlements.

== Technology and Material Culture ==
=== Settlements ===
In terms of overall size, most of the settlements were very small except for a few archeological sites such as Pandu Rajar Dhibi in Purba Bardhaman district or Mahisdal in Birbhum district, and these smaller settlements did not last as long as the larger ones. The settlements were along the riverbanks; it is assumed that the main reasons for settlement along the riverbanks were the fertile land and water supply of the river valleys. Archaeologists have unearthed a large number of artefacts from these ancient ruins. The largest collections of Pandu culture artefacts are found at museums in Kolkata, including the State Archaeological Museum of West Bengal.

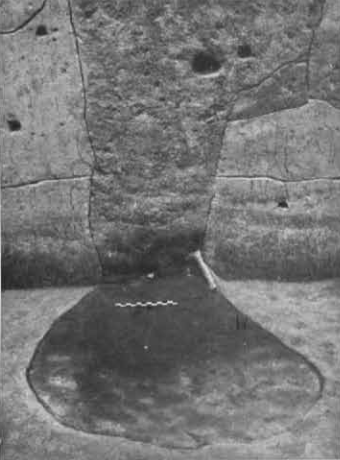
Plan and section of pit in the Pandu Rajar Dhibi

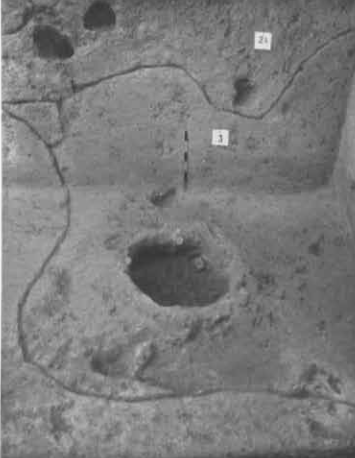
A remain of Mud-oven, which has been found in the period-IV

These settlements consisted of mud houses, traces of which have been completely obliterated. The people of this culture used to decorate the floors of their houses with a layer of burnt husks and mud. The houses were doubtless built of simple and perishable materials, and the presence of large quantities of ash on the floors indicates their fire hazard.

=== Agriculture ===
Agriculture was the main occupation of the people of this Copper Age culture, which is evident from the presence of large quantities of burnt rice in the mounds of the Pandu kings and at Mahishdal. The location of chalcolithic settlements suggests that each settlement had its own agricultural field. By setting up their villages along rivers, especially in low-lying and floodplain areas, chalcolithic farmers were able to exploit the fertile soil. Perhaps the selection of the most productive areas along the river for permanent settlement also indicates that these villagers were convinced that the continuous growth of crops and grains on the same land would deplete the fertility of the soil if the agricultural areas were not revitalized and enriched annually by flooding.

The cultivated species was Oryza sativa but these farmers also cultivated its wild descendants. There were barns for storing rice, which were of the completely fully exposed barns. Two such barns have been found in Mahishdal; Each barn, 1.28 m in diameter with a depth of 1.25 m, could hold 900 kg of rice, and it is estimated that there were 20 such granaries at one time in the settlement.

=== Pottery ===
==== Dishes ====
The ware of this culture was made from local clay, using the potter's wheel. However, in early time, specimens were made only with the help of hands, evidence of which can be obtained from the Pandu Rajar Dhibi. This culture had a variety of ware. Channel-spouted bowl originated in the early period, dating from the Pandu Rajar Dhibi's period-II (1200–900 BC) and the Mahishdal's period-I (1619–1415 BC). One of the prominent features of these channel-spouted bowls was the long and narrow cut-spout and splayed ends. Gray and pale red ware and black and brown ware were also produced. Among the red wares were bowls with round holes, tumblers (large drinking vessels), lotas (small water pots) and storage jars.

The practice of decorating pottery was prevalent. For red wares decoration, dots and 'dashes' (-), brackets (parallel, vertical and horizontal), pointed triangles, ladders, square designs etc. were used. Patterns of starfish designs have also been found. Dots and dashes, vertical and horizontal parallel lines were used in the decoration of black and red ware. Graffiti were also found on some red ware pots.

==== Sculptures ====
A few terracotta figurines have been recovered from archaeological sites belonging to this culture, including one at Rajar Dhibi and two at Mahishdal. Notable idols are terracotta figures of mother goddess, gymnast, terracotta phallus.

=== Weapons and tools ===
Tools were made from stone, organic materials (bone, horn and antler) and copper. Copper was used to make flutes, kohl-sticks, and arrowheads, while bone items included sharp weapons, arrowheads, needles, and harpoons.

=== Burial ===
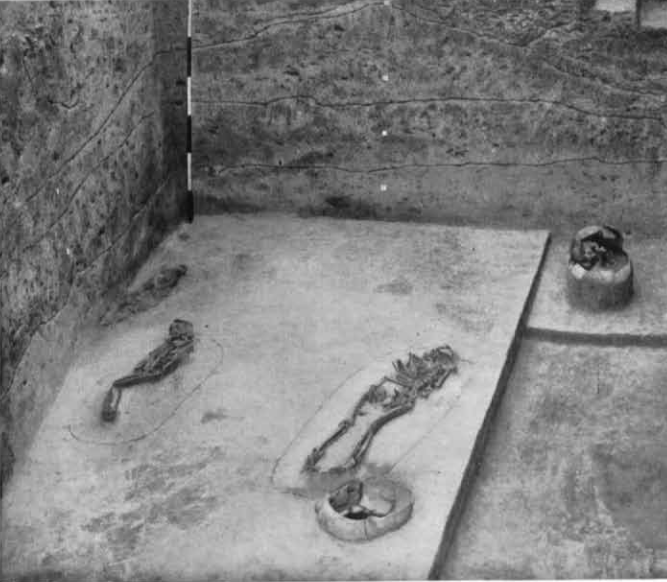
A group of burials in the Pandu Rajar Dhibi

There is archaeological evidence of three types of burials at settlements, these are a) extended burials, b) fragmentary burials and c) Urn-burials. It is not known, however, whether the variation in burials is a sign of differences in status or is related to differences in burial treatment of the dead within communities or within groups within communities. No objects or products of the person's use were found in the burials, making it impossible to identify the individual significance of the deceased.

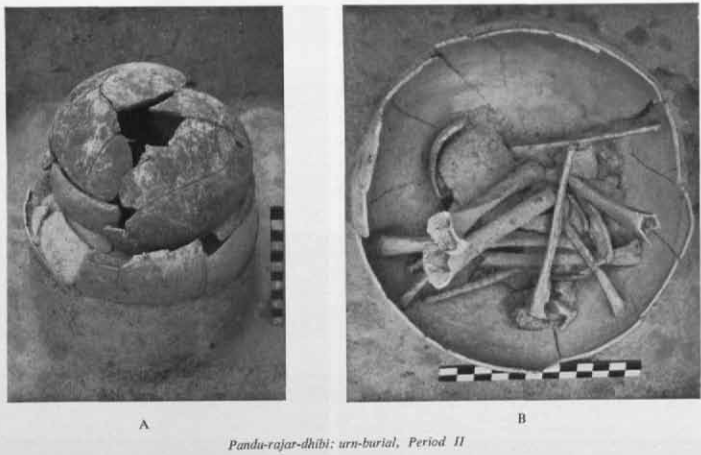
Urn-burial, Period-II, Pandu Rajar Dhibi

In Pandu Rajar Dhibi (Mound of King Pandu), bodies were found lying in an east–west orientation, whereas in the Haraipur burial ground, the dead were found lying in a north–south orientation. This leads to the assumption that the concept and belief of the orientation of the corpse in burial did not arise among the people of this culture.

== Bibliography ==
- Ghosh, Amalananda (1989a). An Encyclopaedia of Indian Archaeology. Vol. 1. Munshiram Manoharlal Publishers. ISBN 8 1-2 15-0088-5.
- Ghosh, Amalananda (1989b). An Encyclopaedia of Indian Archaeology (PDF). Vol. 2. Munshiram Manoharlal Publishers. ISBN 81-215-0089-3.
- Rag, Pankaj; Shinde, Vasant; Misra, Om Prakash, eds. (2013). Art and archaeology of Madhya Pradesh and adjoining regions: recent perspectives. Bhopal: Directorate of Archaeology, Archives & Museums, Govt. of M. P. ISBN 978-81-89660-18-5.
- Ghosal, Jaydeep (2018). "Settlement Archaeology of Kopai River, Birbhum District, West Bengal: A Preliminary Study" (PDF). Heritage: Journal of Multidisciplinary Studies in Archaeology.
- Gupta, Sunil (16 October 2007). "The Bay of Bengal Interaction Sphere (1000 BC - AD 500)". Bulletin of the Indo-Pacific Prehistory Association. 25. doi:10.7152/bippa.v25i0.11911.
- Datta, Asok (16 October 2007). "Subsistence strategies of the Chalcolithic people of West Bengal: an appraisal". Bulletin of the Indo-Pacific Prehistory Association. 25. doi:10.7152/bippa.v25i0.11913.
- Biswas, Oindrila; Paruya, Dipak Kumar; Saradar, Binod; Mandal, Krishna Kali; Bera, Subir (2024). "Decoding Ancient Vegetation and Environment Using Potsherd Palynology: A Case Study from an Archaeological Site of Deltaic West Bengal, India" (PDF). Applications of Palynology in Stratigraphy and Climate Studies. Society of Earth Scientists Series. pp. 271–287. doi:10.1007/978-3-031-51877-5_10. ISBN 978-3-031-51876-8.
