= Maritime history of Bengal =

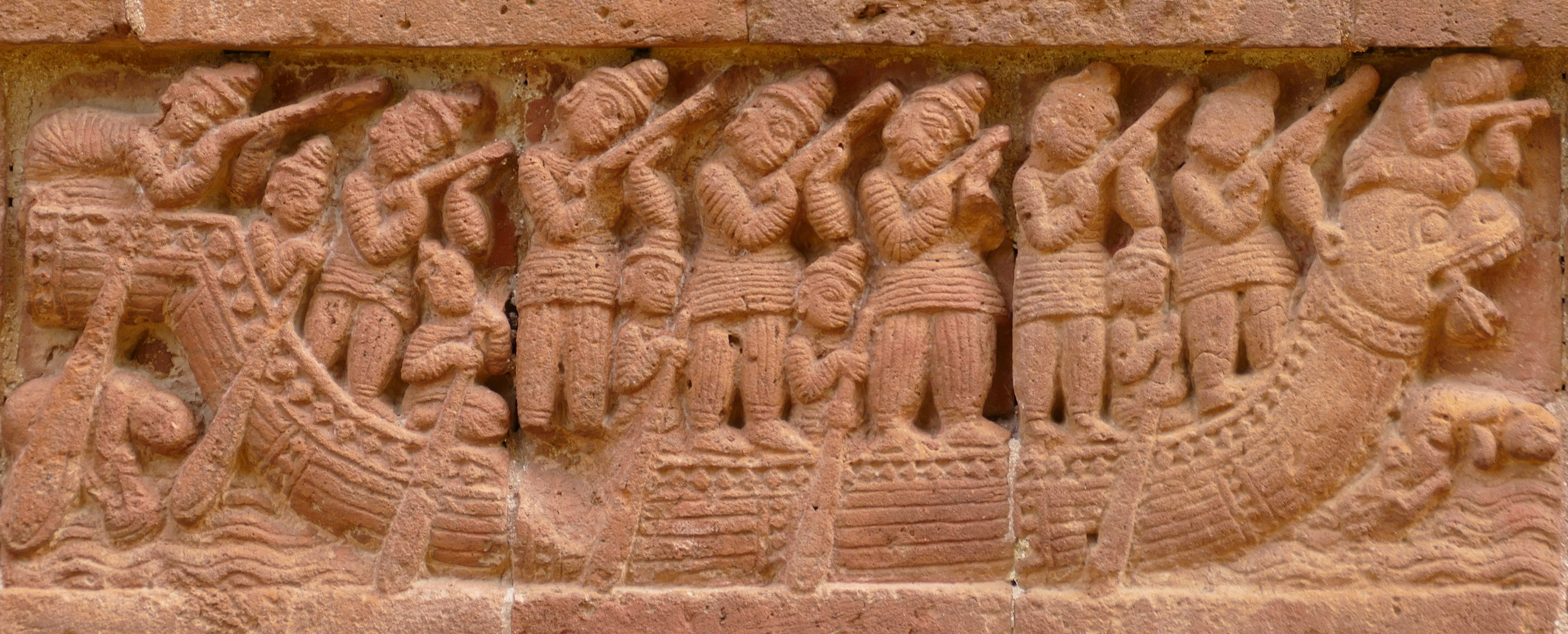
Image of a boat inscribed on a terracotta plaque of the Jor Bangla Temple, Mallabhum kingdom; 1655 CE.

The Maritime history of Bengal (Bengali: বাংলার সামুদ্রিক ইতিহাস; Bānglāra Sāmudrika Itihāsa), represents the era of recorded human interaction with the sea in the southern region of Bengal, including shipping and shipbuilding, shipwrecks, naval warfare, and military installations and lighthouses, which were built to protect or assist navigation and development in Bengal. The Bay of Bengal is located to the south of the Bengal and there are navigable rivers that have greatly facilitated the influence of maritime transport and trade.

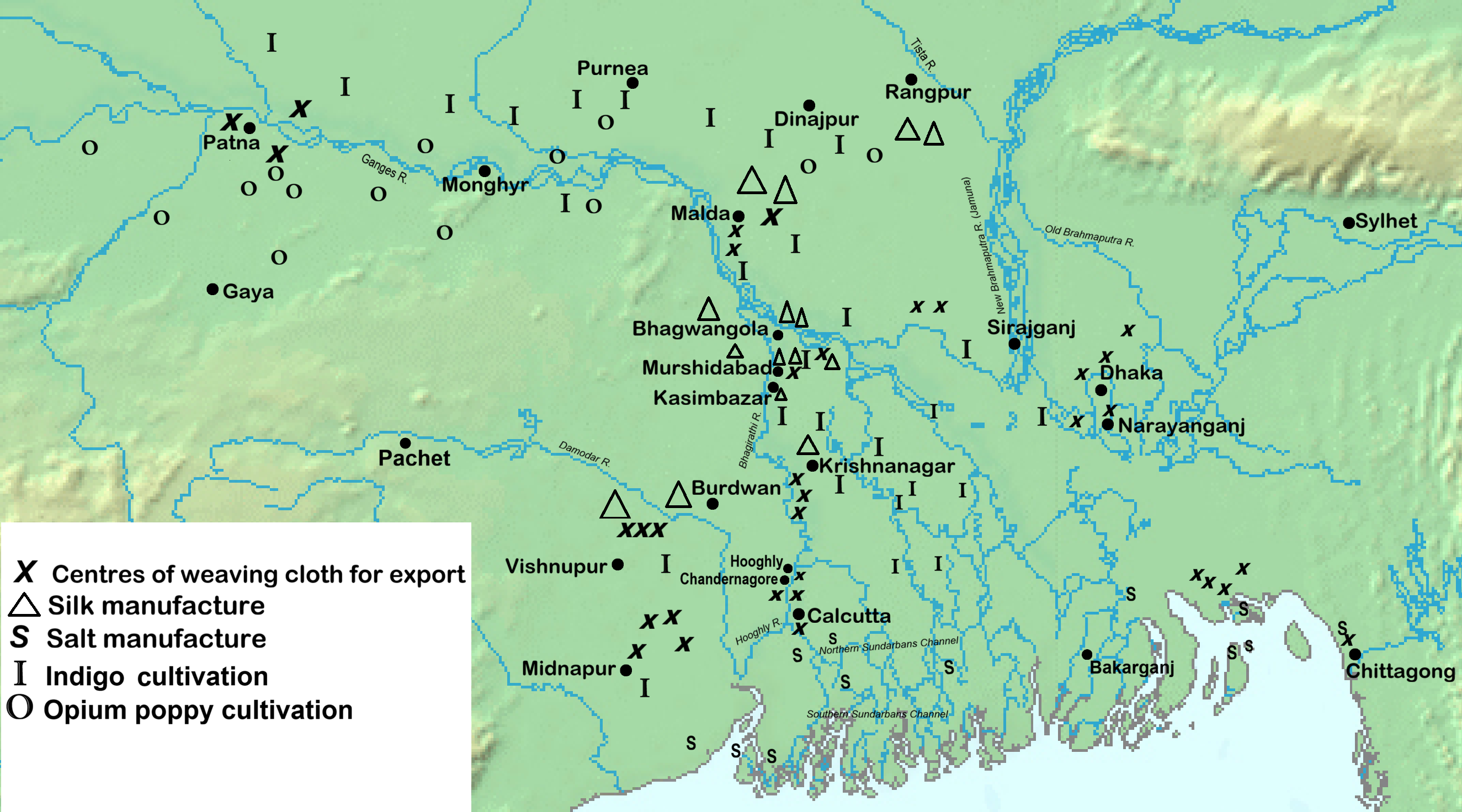
Centres of cloth weaving for export and of Bengal silk manufacture (1740–1828)

The maritime trade of Bengal was centered on the Bay of Bengal. For most of the 16th and 17th centuries, the major ports of Bengal, Satgaon and Chittagong, and later Hooghly, maintained significant commercial links with Burma, Malacca and Aceh. The second trade route connected Bengal with Sri Lanka, the Maldives and the Malabar Coast, and the third, subsidiary route connected Bengal with Gujarat and West Asia. Bengal's coastal trade with the Karamandal was equally important, which depended on Bengal's annual grain imports. The main exports of Bengal's coastal and overseas transport were various types of manufactured goods and agricultural products—clothes, rice, wheat, gram, sugar, opium, clarified butter, and salt. In return, Bengal imported spices, camphor, porcelain, silk, sandalwood, ivory, metals, conch shells, and cowrie. With the arrival of the Portuguese in the 16th century, Bengal entered the Euro-Asian exchange network, becoming the center of the region's economy.

== Prehistory ==
Excavations at the Pandu Rajar Dhibi in West Bengal have shown that a Chalcolithic culture began around 1600 BC, followed by an Iron Age culture around 750 BC. The tools found at this site indicate maritime trade. Some of the artifacts recovered from here are similar to those found on the islands of Crete Crete and Macedonia, indicating contact with Greece and Europe at a very early period.

== Early kingdoms ==
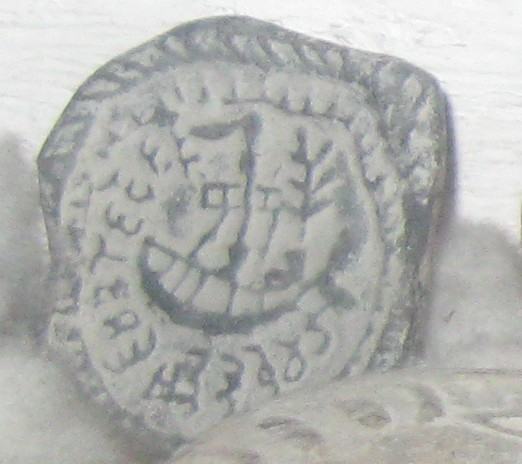
Circular inscribed terracotta sealing showing image of ship from Chandraketugarh, between 400 BC and 100 BC.

The Periplus of the Erythraean Sea mentions a period when maritime trade was active between Bengal and the Western world. During this period, the Gange is mentioned as a port and market-town, which is more similar to Chandraketugarh.

There is a river near it called the Ganges, and it rises and falls in the same way as the Nile. On its bank is a market-town which has the same name as the river, Ganges. Through this place are brought malabathrum and Gangetic spikenard and pearls, and muslin of the finest sorts, which are called Gangetic. It is said that there are gold-mines near these places, and there is a gold coin which is called caltis.

== See also ==
- Maritime history of Odisha
- Indian maritime history
