= Maniklal Sinha =

Indian archaeologist and writer (1916–1994)

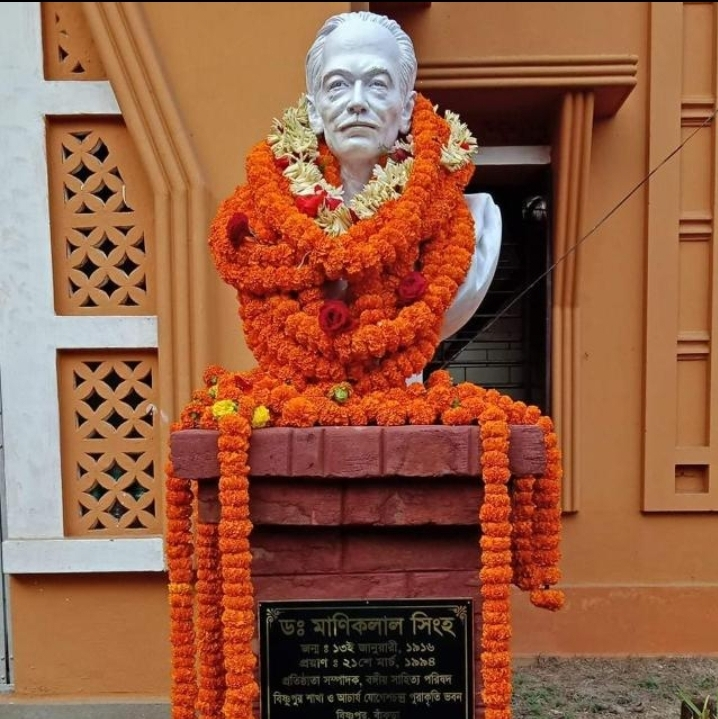
- Born: 13 January 1916; Joykrishnapur, Bankura district, British India
- Died: 21 March 1994 (aged 78); Bishnupur, Bankura district, West Bengal, India
- Occupation: Teacher
- Spouse: Jui Rani Sinha
- Children: 5

Maniklal Sinha, also Maniklal Singha; (13 January 1916 -21 March 1994) was an Indian archaeologist, writer, poet, folk-culture scholar (Lokasangskritibid), novelist and assistant teacher at Bishnupur High School. He was the main entrepreneur and founding director of Acharya Jogesh Chandra Pura Kirti Bhavan(museum) and Bangiya Sahitya Parishad – Bishnupur Branch in 1951 at Bishnupur. He was awarded an honorary D.Litt. degree by the University of Burdwan in 1989 for his contribution as an archaeologist, writer and novelist.

== Biography ==
Maniklal Sinha, son of Amulyaratan Singha and Narayani Debi was born on 13 January 1916 at Joykrishnapur, near Bishnpur. In 1934, he passed Matriculation from Bishnupur High School (English Medium) and then completed I.S.C from Bankura Christian College. On 16 June 1936, Sinha was arrested from his home in Joykrishnapur on charges of sedition for the crime of Swadeshi. On that day he was kept in Bishnupur Jail, but the next day i.e. 17 June, Sinha was transferred to Mednipur Central Jail after that on fourth of September, he was again transferred to Madarganj, Mymensingh . Finally, on 22 December 1937, he was released from jail. In 1938, he married Jui Rani Sinha and later in 1942, he completed a Bachelor's and a master's degree (1945) from Calcutta University and joined Bishnupur High School as an assistant teacher. He took up teachers training i.e. B.T training from David Hare training college in 1952.

At the age of 78, Maniklal Sinha died due to physical ailments of old age at home. In 2016, S.D.O, Bishnupur and D.M, Bankura, organised few events to celebrate his 101 years of birth day at Bishnupur and Bankura.

Maniklal Sinha and Jui Rani Sinha have five sons. Among of them Pradip Kumar Sinha and Pranab Kumar Sinha are eminent writer, Sukanta Sinha is a publisher, Dr. Srikanta Sinha is a scientist, ISRO, Satellite Center, Bangalore, India and Srikrishna Sinha is an independent researcher.

== Works ==
In the 1970s, Maniklal Sinha discovered a Chalcolithic emplacement at Dihar north of Bishnupur, on the north bank of Dwarakeshwar river. Coins, beads, semiprecious stone jewellery, and pottery were excavated. Sinha wrote to the archaeological department, University of Calcutta to take charge of it.

Furthermore, his archaeological research was embodied through these books which are Kasai Sabhyata, Paschim Rarh Tatha Bankura Sanskrti, Rarher Jati o Kristi, Subarnarekha hoite Mayurakshi, Rarher Mantrayan etc. These books are the products of the author's lifelong hard work and so much affection for Rarh region. Moreover, he highlighted the Jhumur song.

== Accolades ==
- National Teacher award in 1979.
- Tamra Patra award for his contributions towards freedom from the Government of India.
- Ram Kumar Bhualoca award for Rarher Mantrayan from Bharatiya Bhasha Parishad in 1982.
- Madhusudan Prize for Rather Jati o Kristi in 1986.
- An honorary D. Litt. from the University of Burdwan in 1989.
- Anushilan Samiti award in 1994.

== Publications ==
=== Poetry books ===
- Deepshikha
- Anabasa‍yaka kaba‍yagrantha

=== Novel ===
- Shalful

=== Drama ===
- Hammer

=== Little magazine ===
- Shilpi
- Rarha Upabhasara Bhumika

=== Criticism book ===
- Adhunika bangla Sahitya

=== Books on Rarh Region ===
- Kasai Sabhyata
- Paschim Rarh Tatha Bankura Sanskrti
- Rarher Jati o Kristi
- Subarnarekha Hoite Mayurakshi
- Rarher Mantrayan
- Jhumur songs of the West Bengal highlands

== See also ==
- Bishnupur
- Bishnupr High School
- List of Bengali-language authors (alphabetical)
- List of Bengali-language authors (chronological)
- Rarh region
- Dihar
- Chunaru
- Bankura

== Bibliography ==
- Rediscovering Living Buddhism in Modern Bengal: Maniklal Singha's The Mantrayāna of Rārh (1979) : From the book Buddhism and Medicine: Mukharji Bihari Projit, https://doi.org/10.7312/salg18936-028
- Mallabhum Bishnupur – Chandara Manoranjan; Mitra & Ghosh Publishers Pvt Ltd, 10 Shyamacharan De Subreet, Kolkata 700 073, https://archive.org/stream/in.ernet.dli.2015.265671/2015.265671.Mallabhum-Bishnupur_djvu.txt
- Late Mediaeval Temples of Bengal (Origins and Classifications Calcutta: The Asiatic Society, 1972) McCutchion David.
- Brick Temples of Bengal: From the Archives of McCutchion, David. (Princeton, N.J.: Princeton University Press, 1983), his research collected, interpreted and published by George Michell.
- Smritir Nadite Manikratan (Dec 1999); Roy, Mohit. Ekabinsati: Editor- Achintya Biswas.
- Puratattik Maniklal Singha (Dec 1999); Das, Mantu, Ekabinsati: Editor- Achintya Biswas.
- Manabbidayar Ekjon Pathik Maniklal Singha (Dec 1999); Karan, Sudhir. Ekabinsati: Editor- Achintya Biswas.
- Why the Bishnupur Museum in Bankura is a must visit https://www.getbengal.com/details/why-the-bishnupur-museum-in-bankura-is-a-must-visit
