= Dihar =

- Village, archaeological site
- Location in West Bengal, India Dihar (India)
- Coordinates: 23.126388°N 87.355252°E
- Country: India
- State: West Bengal
- District: Bankura

Languages
  - Official: Bengali, English
- Time zone: UTC+5:30 (IST)
- Vehicle registration: WB-
- Coastline: 0 kilometres (0 mi)
- Website: wb.gov.in

Dihar is a village and an ancient archaeological site (approximately 4,700 years old) of great antiquarian importance brought into the limelight by Maniklal Sinha. Located in the Bishnupur subdivision of the Bankura district in the Indian state of West Bengal. It is 8 kilometres (5.0 mi) north of Bishnupur and is near Dharapat.

== Geography ==
Places in Bishnupur subdivision in Bankura district
M: Municipal town, CT: census town, R: rural/ urban centre, T: ancient/ temple centre
Owing to space constraints in the small map, the actual locations in a larger map may vary slightly

=== Location ===
Dihar is located at 23.126388°N 87.355252°E.

Note: The map alongside presents some of the notable locations in the subdivision. All places marked in the map are linked in the larger full screen map.

== History ==
Belonging to the days of copper-Bronze Age civilisation and with an intricate narrative more than three millennia old, it is one of the earliest sites of human habitation discovered in Bengal which shows successive layers of prehistory, proto-history and history. Going by the styles of pottery (Black and Red Ware, Red Slipped Ware, Grey Ware, Northern Black Polished Ware, etc. found on different and sometimes intermixed levels), microliths, metallurgical fragments, beads, shells, skeletons, terracotta figurines, homesteads, debitage, shards of bone, and habitational refuge one can place this site in the same archaeo-cultural horizon as Pandu Rajar Dhibi. By about 2700-1500 BCE chalcolithic proto-urban people had settled on the northern banks of the Dwarakeswar, most probably belonging to a socio-culturally and technologically advanced ethno-linguistic group. According to the carbon 14 dating of samples from the Hirapur mound, Dihar is the oldest archaeological settlement of the early village farming culture discovered in Bengal region. Among the four mounds at Dihar, the oldest specimen is from the Hirapur mound, which is 4700 years old. Early village farming culture in Dihar existed between 2700 BC and 1500 BC, which was contemporary with the Pre-Harappan, Harappan and Post-Harappan periods. After this early proto-historic period, stretching from the copper-Bronze Age to the early Iron Age of the pre-Maurya to the Shunga eras, nothing noticeable has been discovered at Dihar till confirmed Saivite activities beginning roughly from around the 13th-14th centuries CE.

== Demographics ==
According to the 2011 Census of India, Dihar had a total population of 815 of which 416 (51%) were males and 399 (49%) were females. Population below 6 years was 84. The total number of literates in Dihar was 450 (61.56% of the population over 6 years).

== Culture ==
The remains of the Shnareshwara (ষাঁড়েশ্বর) and Shaileshwara (শৈলেশ্বর) Shiva temples, built upon one of the primary chalcolithic/æneolithic habitational mounds, are some of the major attractions at Dihar. Either king Prithwi Malla of the Malla dynasty of Bishnupur had commissioned the temples (their architectural style being referred to as 'rekha deul') to be constructed in 1346 CE (the date being highly debatable academically) or, as deduced from their structural and architectural affinities, had them repaired, restored and reconsecrated in 1346 CE, as the two temples could have been built by monarchs from earlier dynasties in the form of twin Jain/Buddhist monuments at around the period when the Siddheshwara temple was built nearby at Bahulara at some point of time during the Pala era. Moreover, till date, much academic debate remains over the exact dates of their construction. The unkempt laterite stone walls of the temples have suffered badly from centuries of erosion but intricate floral designs and miniature human figurines captured in dramatic poses can still be made out. Furthermore, some eroded or defaced images of divinity can also be seen upon the stone panels. Pilgrims, to this day, gather in the area during Shivratri.

Both the Shnareshwara and Shaileshwara temples are included in the List of Monuments of National Importance in West Bengal by the Archaeological Survey of India (serial no. N-WB-28 & 29).

See also - Bengal temple architecture

== Dihar picture gallery ==
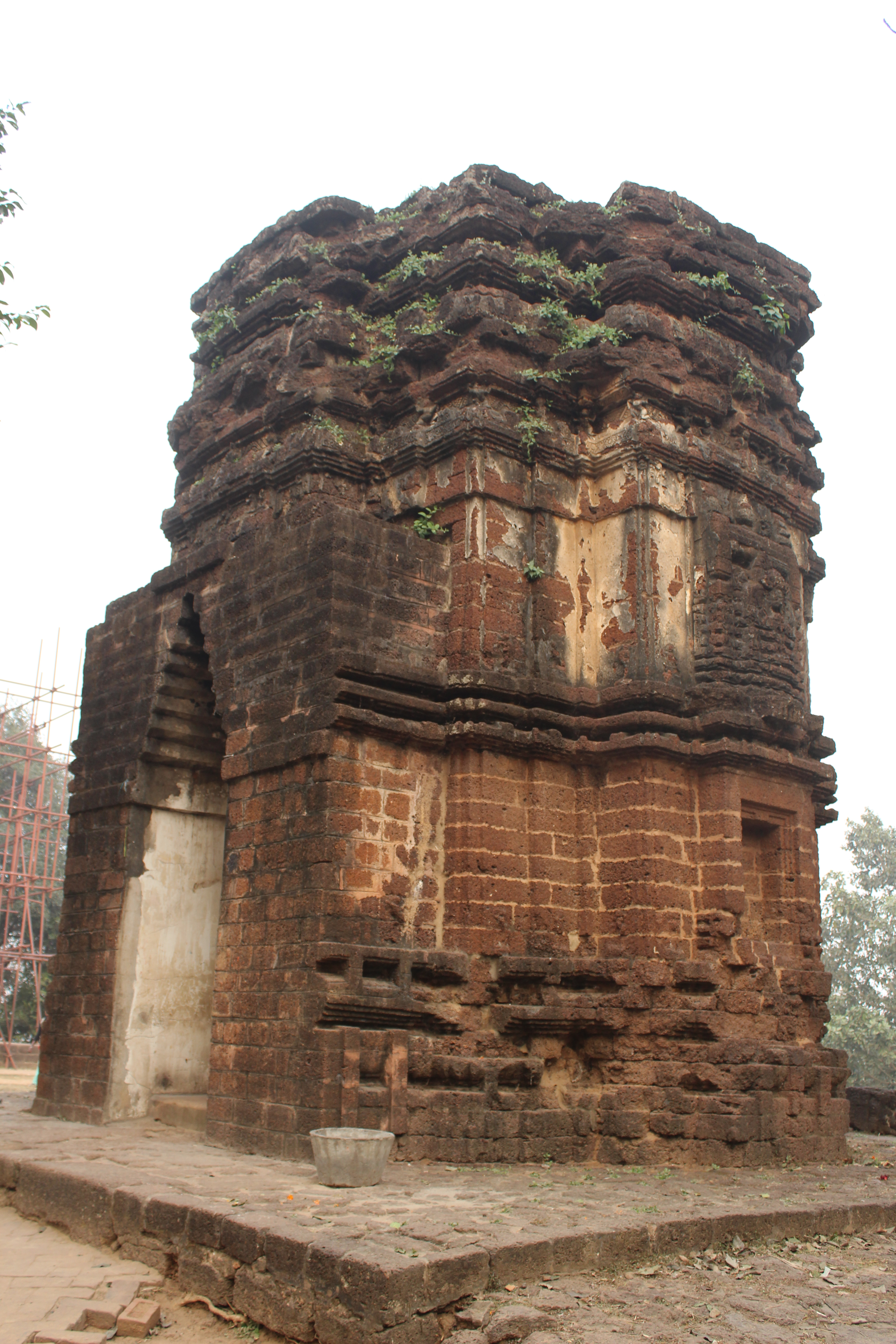
Shaileswar temple

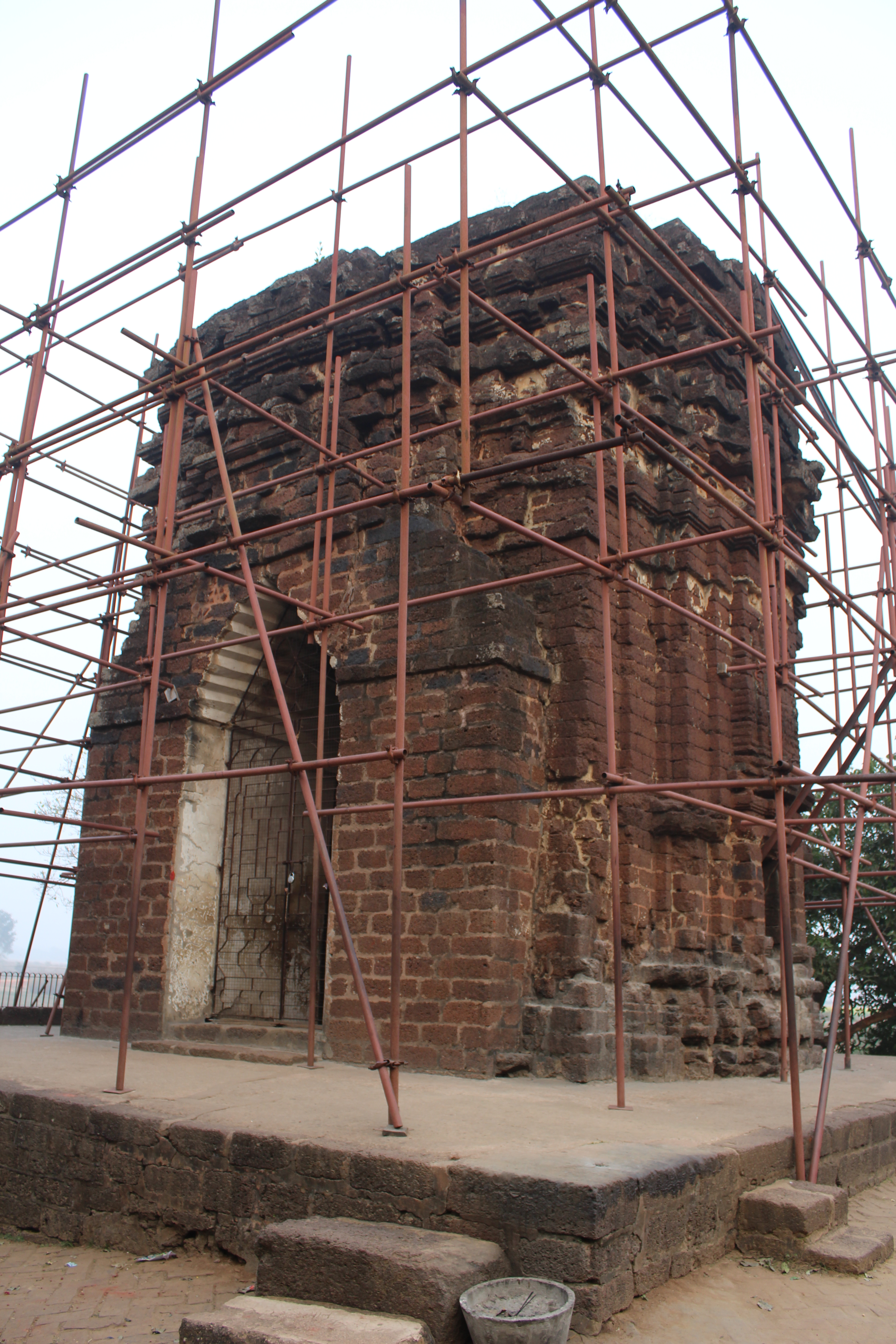
Sareswar temple

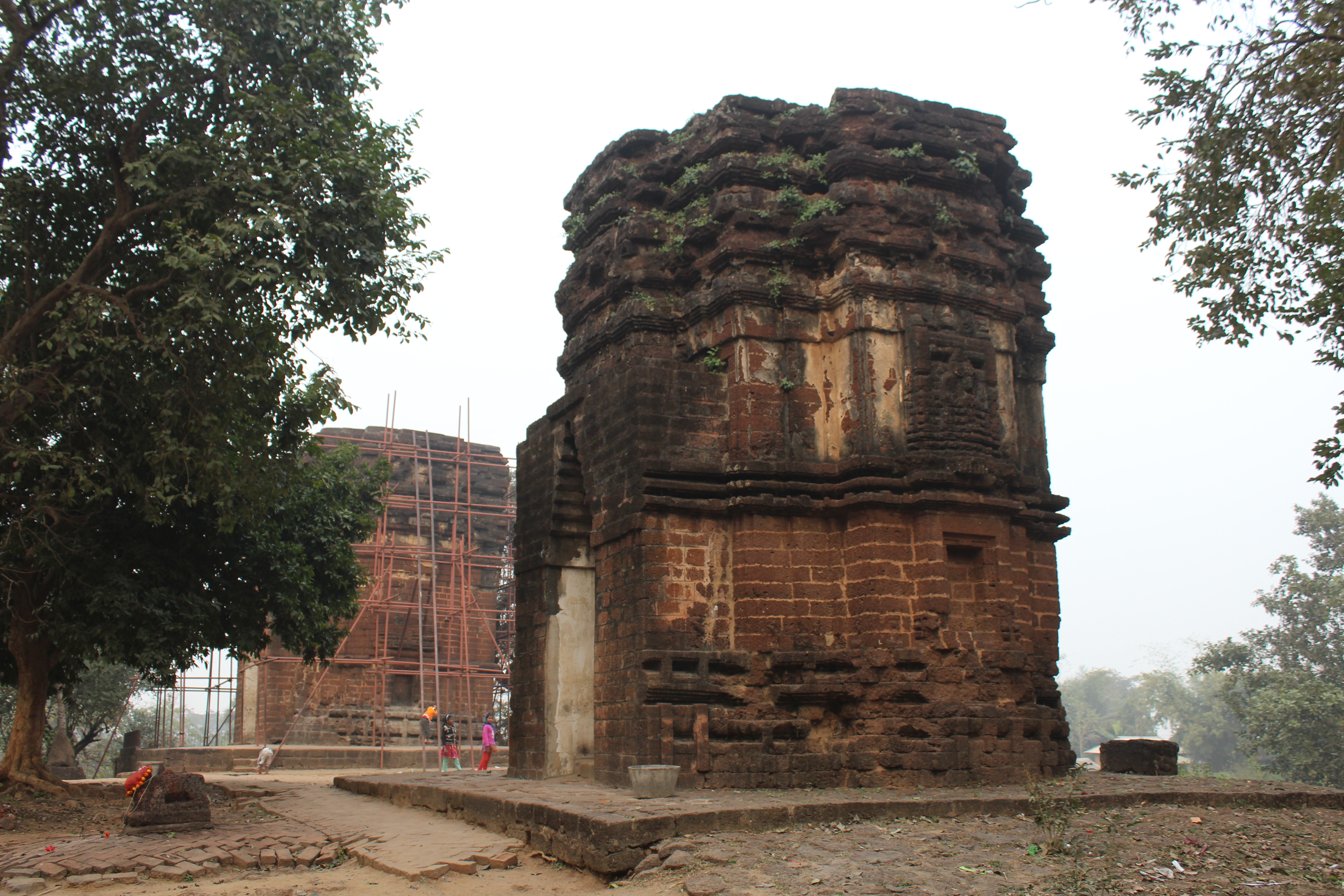
Both the temples

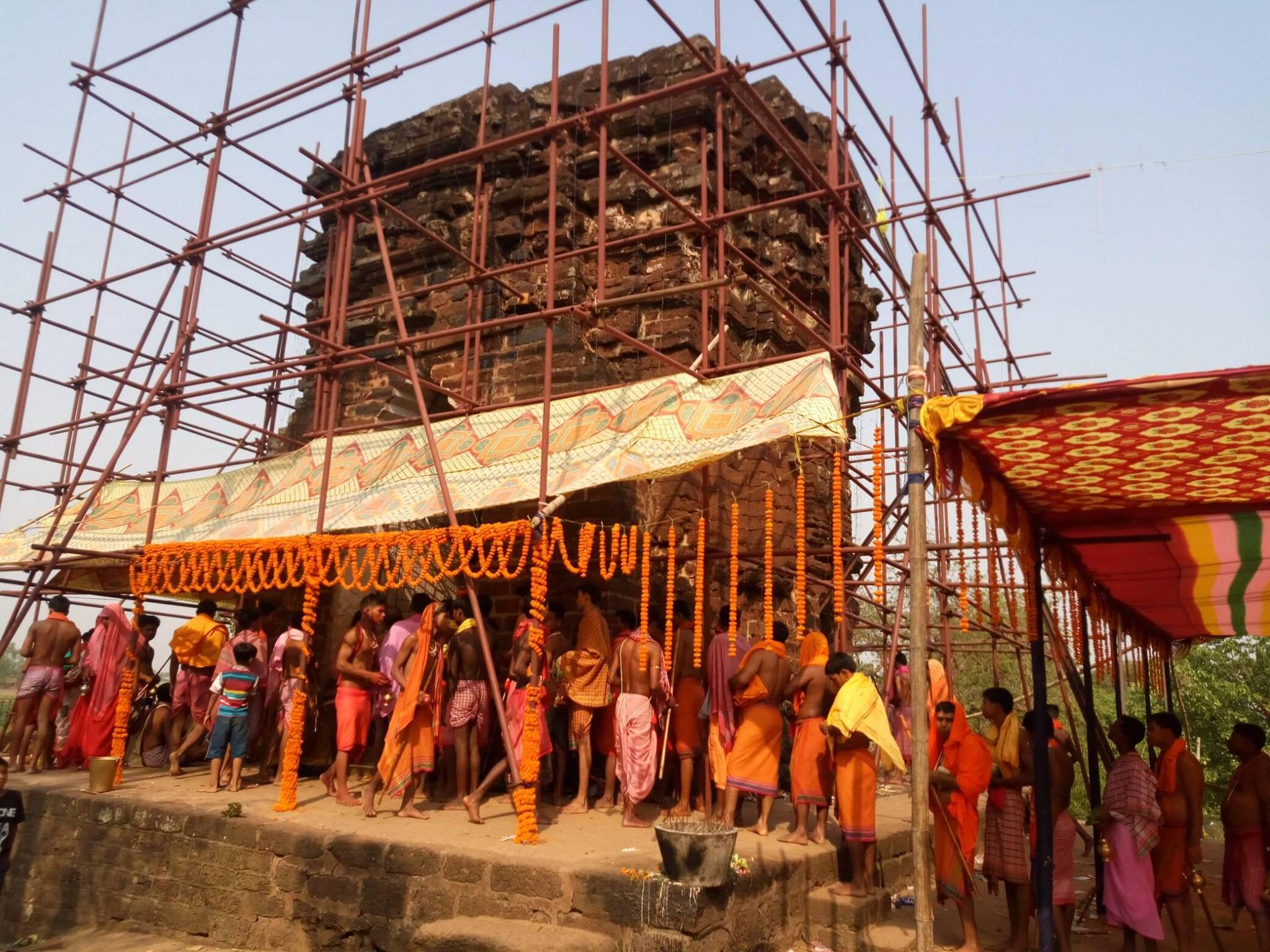
Religious ceremony in progress

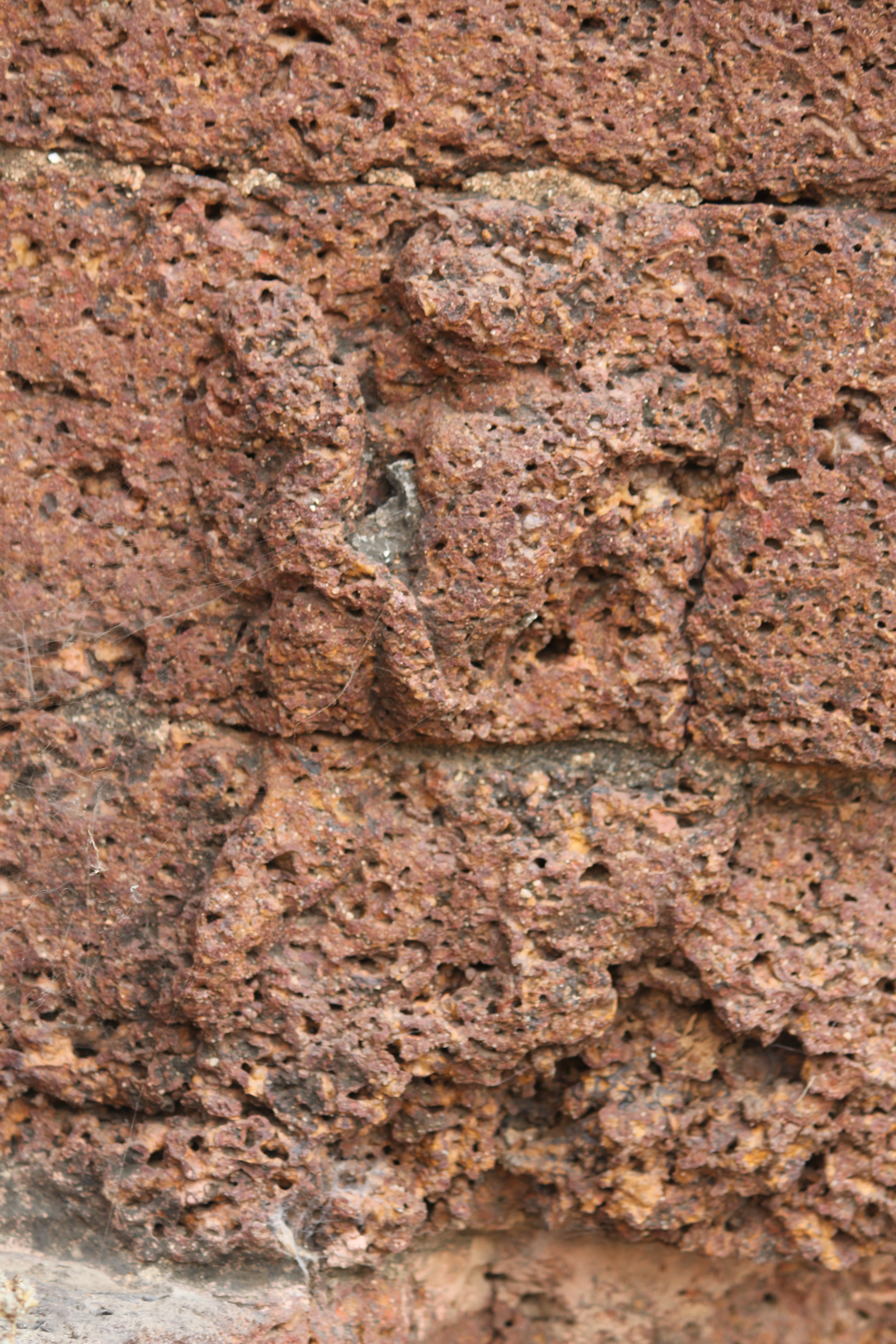
Shaileswar temple wall

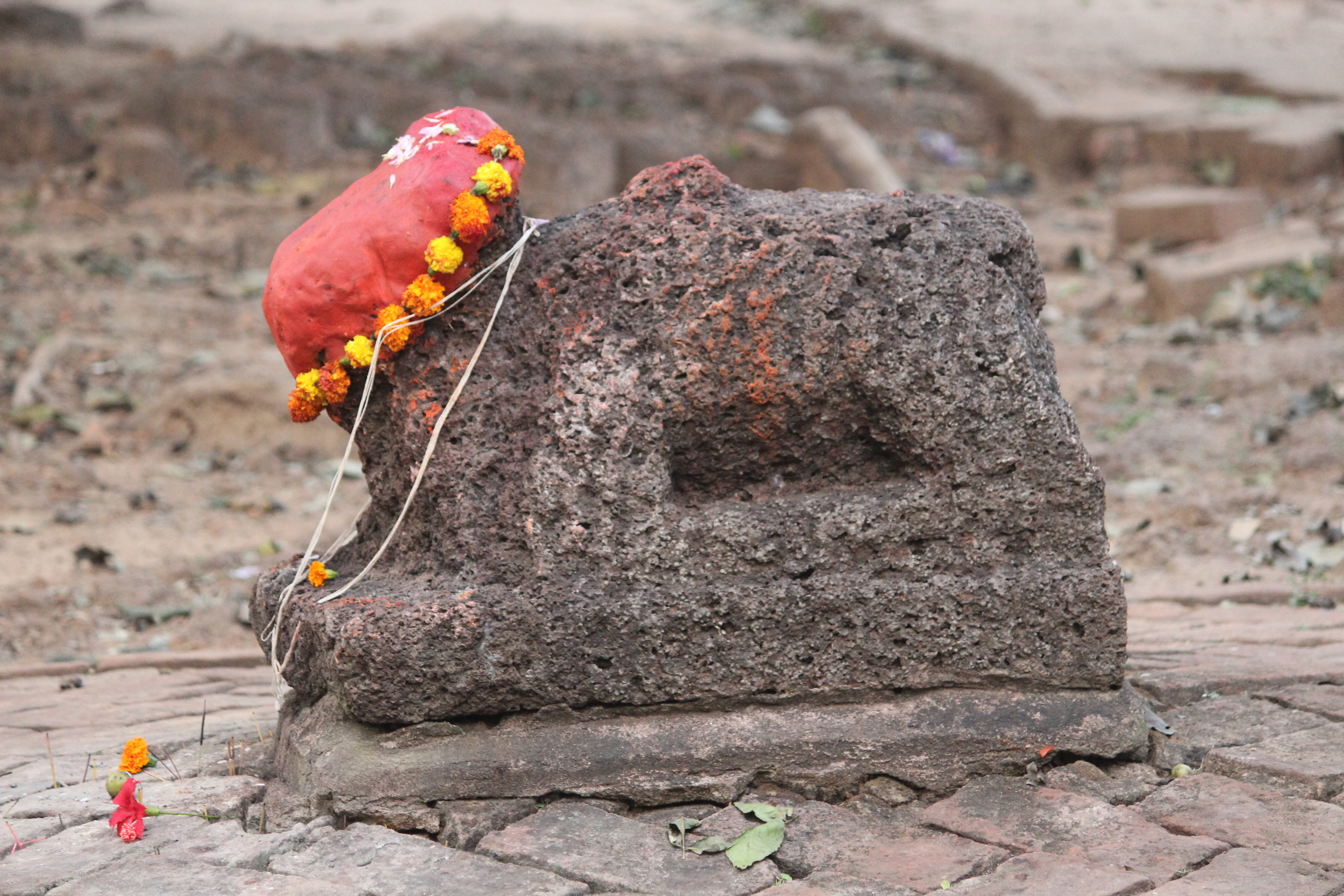
In the Shaileswar temple
