= Anglo-Jat wars =

The Anglo–Jat War were series of battles fought in the Indian sub-continent between the Bharatpur State and the British East India Company over territory. They were:

- Battle of Deeg (1804)
- Battle of Bharatpur (1805)
- Couping of Gohad-Gwalior (1805)
- Sieges of Bharatpur (early 19th century)
