= Bharatpur =

Bharatpur may refer to:

== India ==
- Bharatpur division, Rajasthan, India
  - Bharatpur district, within Bharatpur division
    - Bharatpur, Rajasthan, a city in Bharatpur district
    - Bharatpur (Lok Sabha constituency)
    - Bharatpur (Rajasthan Assembly constituency)
  - Bharatpur State, former princely state in modern Rajasthan
  - Siege of Bharatpur (disambiguation)
- Bharatpur, Chhattisgarh, a subdivision and tehsil of Koriya district in Chhattisgarh
- Bharatpur, Murshidabad, a village in Murshdiababd district, West Bengal

- Bharatpur I, community development block
- Bharatpur II, community development
- Bharatpur, West Bengal Assembly constituency

- Bharatpur, Purba Bardhaman, a village in Purba Bardhaman district, West Bengal
- Bharatpur, an archaeological site in Purba Bardhaman district, West Bengal
- Bharatpur Assembly constituency (disambiguation)

== Nepal ==
- Bharatpur, Nepal, a city in Nepal
  - Bharatpur Airport
- Bharatpur, Dhanusa, village in Nepal
- Bharatpur, Mahottari, village in Nepal
