= Jaykrishnapur (disambiguation) =

- Jaykrishnapur is a census town in Hooghly district, West Bengal, India
- Joykrishnapur is a village in Bankura district, West Bengal, India

It also refers to:

- Jaykrishnapur, Murshidabad, a census town in Murshidabad district, West Bengal, India
