= Bharatpur (archaeological site) =

Archaeological site in West Bengal

- Location within West Bengal
- 23.4134°N 87.4578°E
- Type: Settlement
- Cultures: Early village farming culture
- Location: Bharatpur, West Bengal, India

History
- Built: 1735–1417 BCE
- Abandoned: 8th–9th centuries A.D.
- Event: not known

Site notes
- Condition: Ruined
- Owner: Public
- Public access: Yes

Bharatpur is an archaeological site of Early village farming culture located in the Indian state of West Bengal. Construction of the settlement is believed to have started around 1735–1417 BC.

The prehistoric settlement at Bharatpur village was discovered in 1971 by the Eastern Circle of Archaeological Survey of India and the University of Burdwan. Excavations were carried out at Bharatpur in 1971–72, 1972–73, 1973–74 and 1974–75. Black and red pottery, terracotta objects and cut bone weapons were discovered during the excavations.

== Archaeology ==
The Eastern Circle of Archaeological Survey of India and the University of Burdwan jointly undertook a program of survey exploration and excavation in the 1970s. These excavations proved the presence of ancient settlement. Bharatpur was first excavated in 1971 and last in 1975, which establishing the archaeological site as a center of Bengal's early village farming culture. This place is located 6 km (3.7 mi) from Panagarh on the north bank of Damodar river.

Archaeologists claim that the settlement was a center of the early village farming and the Black and Red Pottery culture of West Bengal. According to the carbon 14 dating of the samples obtained, Bharatpur is one of the archaeological settlements of early village farming culture discovered in West Bengal. More than 3700 years old specimens have been found from the archaeological site. Early village farming culture existed here from 1700 BCE, which was contemporary with the Pre-Harappan, Harappan and Post-Harappan periods.

== Excavated Bharatpur ==
Buddhist monastery and stupa have been discovered at Bharatpur during excavations. Also, evidence of early agricultural communities has been found in the recovered samples.

=== Buddhist Stupa ===
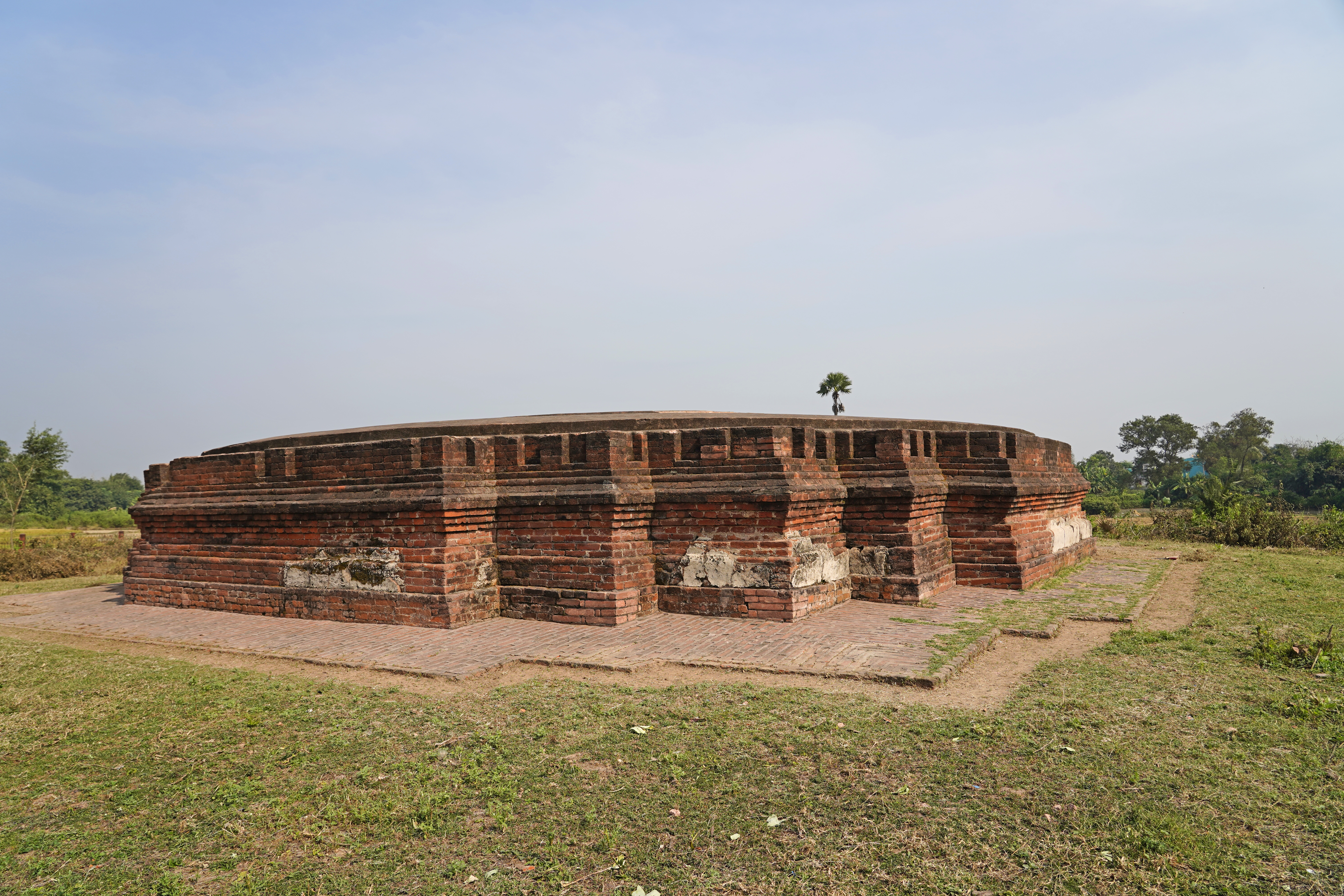
Bharatpur Buddhist Stupa, which was built between the 7th and 9th centuries.

The stupa was built between the 7th and 9th centuries during the Pala period. It was built in brick and stone in the Pancharatha style, with a base area of 13 square meters. Today, the base structure of the stupa survives, When the rest of the part was destroyed. Two different sizes of bricks are used in the construction, which are 30 x 8 x 7 cm and 48 x 21 x 6 cm respectively. The facades are embellished with corbelled courses, moldings and chaitya gavaksa motifs of floral designs. The niches of stupa were probably decorated with Buddha statues. Eleven Buddha statues seated on Vajrasana in Bhumiparsha Mudras – all five fingers of the right hand extended to touch the ground – were discovered in this ruined stupa.

== Bibliography ==
- Chattopadhyay, Rupendra Kumar; Bandyopadhyay, KumKum (1 December 2015). "A Preliminary Study of the Worked Bone Industry in the Middle and Lower Ganga Valleys: From the Mesolithic to the Early Historic Periods". Studies in South Asian Heritage: essays in memory of M Harunur Rashid. Bangla Academy. ISBN 9789840753833.
