= Bharatpur Assembly constituency =

Bharatpur Assembly constituency may refer to

- Bharatpur, Rajasthan Assembly constituency
- Bharatpur, West Bengal Assembly constituency

== See also ==
- Bharatpur (disambiguation)
