= Bishnupur High School (Bankura) =

- বিষ্ণুপুর উচ্চ বিদ্যালয়
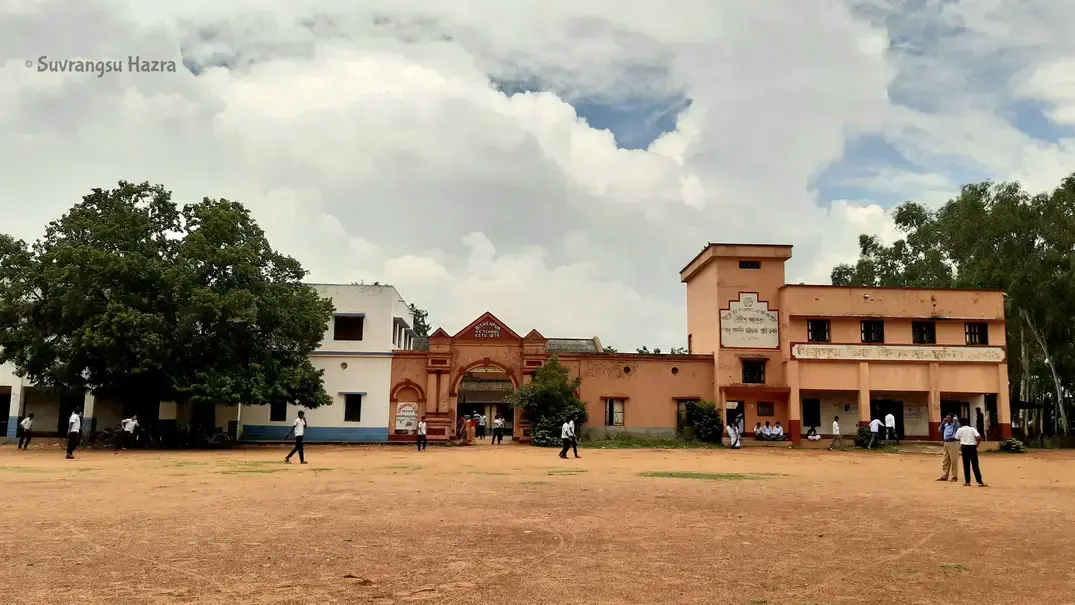
- Bishnupur High school

Location
- Bishnupur College Rd, Dalmadal Para; Bishnupur, West Bengal, 722122; India; 23.0676724°N 87.3224299°E

Information
- Type: Higher secondary school
- Motto: শ্রদ্ধাবান লভতে জ্ঞানম (One who has faith, attains knowledge)
- Established: 1879
- School board: W.B.B.S.E W.B.C.H.S.E
- Years offered: 6+2(H.S.)
- Gender: Class 5 to 10 Boys Class 11 to 12 Co- ed
- Language: Bengali
- Campus type: Urban
- Website: bhsbankura.in

Bishnupur High School is one of the oldest higher secondary schools of Bankura district. It is situated at Dalmadal para, Bishnupur College Road in Bishnupur, Bankura, in the Indian state of West Bengal.

== History ==
The school was established in 1879 by the British Government. In the colonial era it was an English Medium school only for boys but now Bishnupur High School is a Co-Education school in the Higher Secondary section. Initially, it was named Bishenpur High School according to the European pronunciation of Bengali term. This school is affiliated to West Bengal Board of Secondary Education for Madhyamik and to West Bengal Council of Higher Secondary Education for Higher Secondary.

== Notable Persons ==
- Maniklal Sinha

== See also ==
- Education in India
- List of schools in India
- Education in West Bengal
