= Chunaru =

Bengali Hindu caste

Chunaru চুনারু
- Kuladevta (male): Agastya
- Religions: Hinduism
- Languages: Bengali
- Populated states: West Bengal

Chunaru (Bengali: চুনারু) or Chunari is a Bengali Hindu caste whose traditional occupation is the manufacture of slaked lime from the shell of snails. After the advent of quick lime from limestone and the arrival of cement as mortar ingredient, the Chunaru struggled to make a living of their traditional vocation and gradually dwindled in numbers.

According to Maniklal Sinha, there are only about 200 to 300 Chunaru families in West Bengal today.

== History ==
The Brahma Vaivarta Purana and the Brihaddharma Purana have no mention of the Chunarus. According to Santosh Kumar Kundu, the Chunarus were probably counted within the Shankhakars. He also believes that the Chunaru are neither counted as a Scheduled Caste or as an Other Backward Class probably because their numbers are very small.

The shells are first burnt in earthen ovens and then watered to prepare the slaked lime.

== See also ==
- Etymology of Kolkata
- Yogi
