= Dihar (archaeological site) =

Archaeological site in West Bengal, India

- Location within West Bengal
- 23°07′10″N 87°22′00″E
- Type: Settlement
- Cultures: Neolithic and Early village farming culture
- Location: Dihar, West Bengal, India

History
- Built: 2700 BCE
- Abandoned: Medieval/Late Medieval (Malla)
- Event: not known

Site notes
- Excavation dates: 1983–84, 1984–85, 1993–94, 2008–09 and 2012–13
- Condition: Ruined
- Owner: Public
- Public access: Yes

Dihar is an archaeological site of Neolithic and Early village farming culture located in the Indian state of West Bengal. Construction of the settlement is believed to have started around 2700 BC. Dihar people developed a system of exploitation of natural resources and subsequent commercialization of commodities (prehistoric exchange system). The financial security afforded by this system encouraged artistic excellence in pottery making (which surely entails an appreciation of created forms) and bone-working.

The prehistoric settlement at Dihar village was discovered in 1983 by the University of Calcutta's Department of Archaeology. Excavations at Dihar were carried out in two phase, the first phase was conducted in 1983–84, 1984–85 and 1993–94 and the second phase in 2008–09 and 2012–13.

Bowls, black-red pottery and miniature vessels were discovered during the excavations. Human skeletal remains have also been found in the excavations.

== History ==
In the early period (pre-metal phase) the people of Dihar were involved with agriculture. At this time they did not know the use of metals. They mainly used various tools made from stone. Animal husbandry existed alongside food production through agriculture. This change was achieved after the abandonment of the subsistence technique of prolonged hunting-gathering.

It is estimated that they started using metal around 1500 BC. Evidence of the use of metal has been found in Dihar as early as 1300 BC.

During the early historic period population and settlement characteristics, including area, increased rapidly. Apparently, settlement shifted along a north-south axis about 1000 BCE.

By the end of Malla period (10th to 17th centuries AD) the settlement had spread beyond their earlier boundaries, and developed into an emerging politico-religious consciousness. Two Shiva temples of Dihar were built on top of the structural mounds or remains of the earlier settlement to legitimise of the relationship between the ruling authority and the ruled.

=== Chronology ===
According to the samples obtained, the Dihar period is divided into six cultural phases. Use of metals was absent in the first phase, but use of metals began in the second phase; in two phases, the Early Agricultural Culture and the Black-Red Pottery Culture developed. The third phase belonged to the early historic period. The Black-Red Pottery culture was present during this phase. The fourth phase belonged to the Early Indian Middle Ages. The fifth and sixth phases included the pre-Malla and the Malla period of the medieval respectively.

Stages	Dates	Events
Stage I	2700–1500 BCE	Early Agricultural Culture and Black-Red Pottery Culture
Stage II	1500–500 BCE	Early Agricultural Culture and Black-Red Pottery Culture
Stage III		early historic period
Stage IV		Indian Middle Ages
Stage V	10th to 17th centuries AD	pre-Malla period
Stage VI	10th to 17th centuries AD	Malla period

== Archaeology ==
Four mounds have been standing in Dihar village since ancient times. The villagers were aware of the presence of mounds. Except the Hirapur mound, the remaining three mounds have temple. Later the University of Calcutta undertook a program of survey exploration and excavation. This settlement was discovered while exploring the mounds. Dihar was first excavated in 1984 and last in 2013, which extending Bengal's early village farming culture to 2700 BC. The site is located 6 kilometers (3.7 mi) from Bishnupur, the capital of the medieval Mallabhum kingdom, on the north bank of the Dwarakeswar river.

Archaeologists claim that the settlement was a center of early village farming culture and the Black and red ware culture of West Bengal. According to the carbon 14 dating of samples from the Hirapur mound, Dihar is the oldest archaeological settlement of the early village farming culture discovered in modern West Bengal. Among the four mounds at Dihar, the oldest specimen is from the Hirapur mound, which is 4700 years old. Early village farming culture in Dihar existed between 2700 BC and 1500 BC, which was contemporary with the Pre-Harappan, Harappan and Post-Harappan periods.

== Civilization ==
The people of Dihar contributed in settlement, metallurgy and pottery to the civilization of Bengal and the Lower Gangetic Valley. They also contributed to jewellery making; in the early period jewellery was made from bone and later from metal.

=== Metallurgy and jewellery ===
The people of Dihar first started using copper, and later iron. The plateau environment, and the forest dwellers and ancient metalworking traditions in the forest region must have influenced and dictated the situation at Dihar. The Chota Nagpur plateau served as a potential metal source. Workers made rings and rods from copper. Perhaps these sticks were used for applying eye collyrium.

A broken specimen was recovered from Mansatala Mound. It was probably identified as a tool used for gathering aquatic plants or for bush clearance. This eroded specimen has a considerable thickness with 5.6 cm. According to the weight and shape, it suggests to be classified as a "heavy-duty" tool. Only a skilled metalworker would be able to make such an elaborate tool, which making Dihar's metalworkers demonstrative of skilled craftsmanship.

=== Art ===
Terracotta beads, various toys, discs and animal figurines have been found at Dihar. An unidentified animal figure of red color was found with two legs in a diagonal position at the back of the body. A few more fragmentary parts of animal figurines have been excavated. All these figurines bears witness to the technical skill of the Dihar's artists. All the excavated fragments are red in colour. Fragments of a human figure, red in color, were found.

Dihar artists painted designs on red and black colored pottery. Both white and cream colors have been used. It was customary to fill the entire interior of ceramic dishes with two diagonally running designs with rows of straight and slanted parallel strokes painted in white. The exterior surface close to the rim is encircled by a band of petal-like motifs surmounted by a row of parallel strokes. In most cases the decorative elements were applied near the neck of the vessels and below the border line from where the slope towards the base begins. The ceramic art of Dihar is comparable to the Ganges Valley archaeological sites such as the Raja Nal Mound (Raja Nal Ka Tila), Malhar, Lahuradewa, Jhusi, Narhan, Agiabir and Senuwar.

=== Cultivation and Diet ===
Excavated mounds have revealed the existence of an early rural agricultural culture, which gives an indication of cultivation by the inhabitants of the settlement. The bones of many animals including domestic and wild, indicate a wide food culture. In addition, bone tools, arrowheads and spears provide evidence of the hunter-gatherer lifestyle of the inhabitants.

== Excavated Dihar ==
The archaeological site was discovered by excavating four mounds at Dehar village, namely Maa Bhavanitala Dhibi, Hirapur Dhibi, Mansatala Dhibi and Kalbhairavatala Dhibi. The Maa Bhavanitala Dhibi (mound) is spread over 300 square meters.

=== Cut and worked bones ===
Cut bone and bone tools, arrowheads, and spears have been found. Industrial or manufacturing workshops (potters and metal workers) and furnaces are visible on the Mansatala mound.

=== Human skeleton ===
An almost completely preserved human skeleton has been excavated from the Manasatala mound, which provides very good information about the age, sex and disease. The human skeleton was studied in November 2013, which probably belongs to the early historic period. According to the test results, the skeleton was that of a male, and was around 45 to 50 years old. On observation, lesions in teeth and bones, and pathological lesions were observed. Unfortunately the skeleton does not help to understand the population.

=== Pottery ===
Evidence of pottery begins from Period I. Black and red pottery, carinated vessels, basins, tumblers and miniature pots give evidence of ceramic industry.

=== Wattle and daub structures ===
Reed impressed clay have been found, which reflecting widespread use of Wattle and daub structures. Presumably, the structures were originally used for construction of house. According to the results obtained from sample tests, Wattle and daub structures were built during the Pre-Metallic and Metallic early village farming culture. The tradition of building such structures to have continued for a much longer period. In excavation, mud or rammed floor and reed impressed chunks were found.

== Bibliography ==
- Chattopadhyay, Rupendra Kumar; Acharya, Dipsikha; Majumder, Shubha; Sain, Malay Kumar; Biswas, Pampa; Mondal, Bijan (2013). "Excavation at Dihar 2012-2013 : An Interim Report". Pratna Samiksha. 1: 9–33.
- Tewari, Dr. Rakesh, ed. (2015a). "Indian Archeology 2008-09 - Review" (PDF). Pratna Samiksha. Archaeological Survey of India.
- Chattopadhyay, Rupendra Kumar; Bandyopadhyay, KumKum (1 December 2015). "A Preliminary Study of the Worked Bone Industry in the Middle and Lower Ganga Valleys: From the Mesolithic to the Early Historic Periods". Studies in South Asian Heritage: essays in memory of M Harunur Rashid. Bangla Academy. ISBN 9789840753833.
- Tewari, Dr. Rakesh, ed. (2015b). Indian Archeology 2012-13 - Review (PDF). Archaeological Survey of India.
- Majumder, Shubha; Mushrif-Tripathy, Veena; Acharya, Dipsikha (2017). "Preliminary Studies of Human Skeletal Remains Excavated from Dihar (2012 ‐ 13), District Bankura, West Bengal". Heritage: Journal of Multidisciplinary Studies in Archaeology. 5.
- Deshpande-Mukherjee, Arati; Chattopadhyay, R.K. (2023). "Animals in Archaeology: Integrating Landscapes, Environment and Humans in South Asia" (PDF). Heritage: Journal of Multidisciplinary Studies in Archaeology. 1. University of Kerala.
