= Erenda =

- Location within West Bengal
- 21°55′4.8″N 87°34′42.4″E
- Type: Settlement
- Cultures: Chalcolithic and Early farming culture
- Location: Erenda, West Bengal, India

History
- Built: Approximately 2000 BCE
- Event: not known

Site notes
- Area: 1 ha (2.5 acres)
- Excavation dates: 2015–2017
- Condition: Ruined
- Owner: Public
- Public access: Yes

Erenda was one of the southernmost sites of Neolithic and Early farming culture located in the coastal region of the Indian state of West Bengal. Construction of the settlement is believed to have started around 2000 BC.

The prehistoric settlement at Erenda village was discovered in 2015 by the University of Calcutta's Department of Archeology. Excavations at Erenda were carried out in two field seasons of 2015–16 and 2016–17. According to the Department of Archaeology (University of Calcutta), people started living here after the sea move away due to geological reasons. Probably the inhabitants here came to Erenda from Rarh region of Bengal.

Fish hook and weapons have been discovered during excavations, which were made of bone. Also, ancient rice grains mixed with soil have been found, which providing evidence of agricultural activity.

== Archaeology ==
A copperplate inscription of Gaur king Shashanka was found from this region. After that, University of Calcutta undertook a program of survey exploration and excavation. During this exploration and excavation, this settlement was discovered. Erenda was excavated between 2016 and 2017, extending the Neolithic culture of Bengal to the sea coast. The site is located 70 kilometers (43 mi) from the Copper Age port city of Tamralipta.

Peoples of Erenda village were aware of the presence of an ancient settlement. Farmers of the village had converted a part of the mound into agricultural land, and farmed the land.

The size of the settlement was 1 ha (2.5 acres). Archaeologists claim that the settlement was a center of the Black and Red ware culture of West Bengal. Erenda is the oldest of the ancient archaeological settlements discovered in West Bengal. A Neolithic culture (between 2000 and 1500 BC) also existed, which contemporary with the post-Harappan period.

== Excavated Erenda ==
According to the plan, Erenda extended approximately 100 metres (330 feet) north-south and 100 metres (330 feet) east-west. However, the mound currently measures 30 metres (98 feet) in the north–south and 30 metres (98 feet) in the east–west, the rest of the mound's land having been partially destroyed by agricultural activities. Here the houses were built of mud, basically Phragmites australis mixed with mud, this method still used in rural Bengal.
