= Early agricultural communities in Bengal =

Early Agricultural Communities in Bengal were a group of Chalcolithic farmers, who first developed agriculture in Bengal. No archaeological evidence of large-scale agriculture in Bengal during the Neolithic period preceding the Chalcolithic or Copper Age.

Early agricultural communities are not found in the whole region of Bengal (West Bengal and Bangladesh), they are found only in the south-western part of Bengal (West Bengal).

== Overview ==
Early agricultural communities were settled in the vast plain from the foothills of the Chota Nagpur Plateau to the Bhagirathi-Hooghly river. Evidence of paddy (rice) cultivation has been found in this region. As one moves eastward from the foothills of the plateau, there is evidence of more involvement of the communities in agriculture. The first agricultural communities of Bengal developed around 1500 BC in this region mainly along the Mayurakshi, Ajay, Damodar, Kangsabati and Rupnarayan rivers. Initially, they were confined to the area of the Lalgarh Formation, but later moved east and southeast.

== Settlement ==
Bengal's Early agricultural communities were found in the area bounded by the Ganges in the north, the Subarnarekha River and the Bay of Bengal in the south, and the Bhagirathi-Hooghly River in the east and the foothills of the Chotanagpur Plateau in the west. Most of their settlements are observed in Ajay and Damodar valleys. The settlement area can be divided into three parts according to topography and settlement age, namely - red soil area, old alluvial area and new alluvial area.

=== Red soil region ===
Early agricultural communities first settled in this region. The main settlements here are Bharatpur, Mahishadal, Dihar, Haripur and Tulsipur. Rice grains have been identified with the domesticated species Oryza sativa, which indicates early agricultural communities were involved in rice cultivation. Archaeological finds from the settlements prove that hunting was one of the main means of livelihood of the agricultural communities of this region, along with agriculture. Apart from agriculture, animal husbandry was one of the mainstays of their livelihood.

The region's economy remained largely unchanged throughout its thousand-year history. The main reason for the stagnation of the economy is probably the low fertility of the soil, and with it the low rainfall. As a result, the agricultural and hunter-gatherer civilizations developed by the early agricultural communities were able to produce the necessary resources for themselves, but it failed to build up sufficient resources for later stages of development and growth. So naturally the agrarian settlements in this region disappeared immediately before or after the historic period.

=== Old alluvial area ===
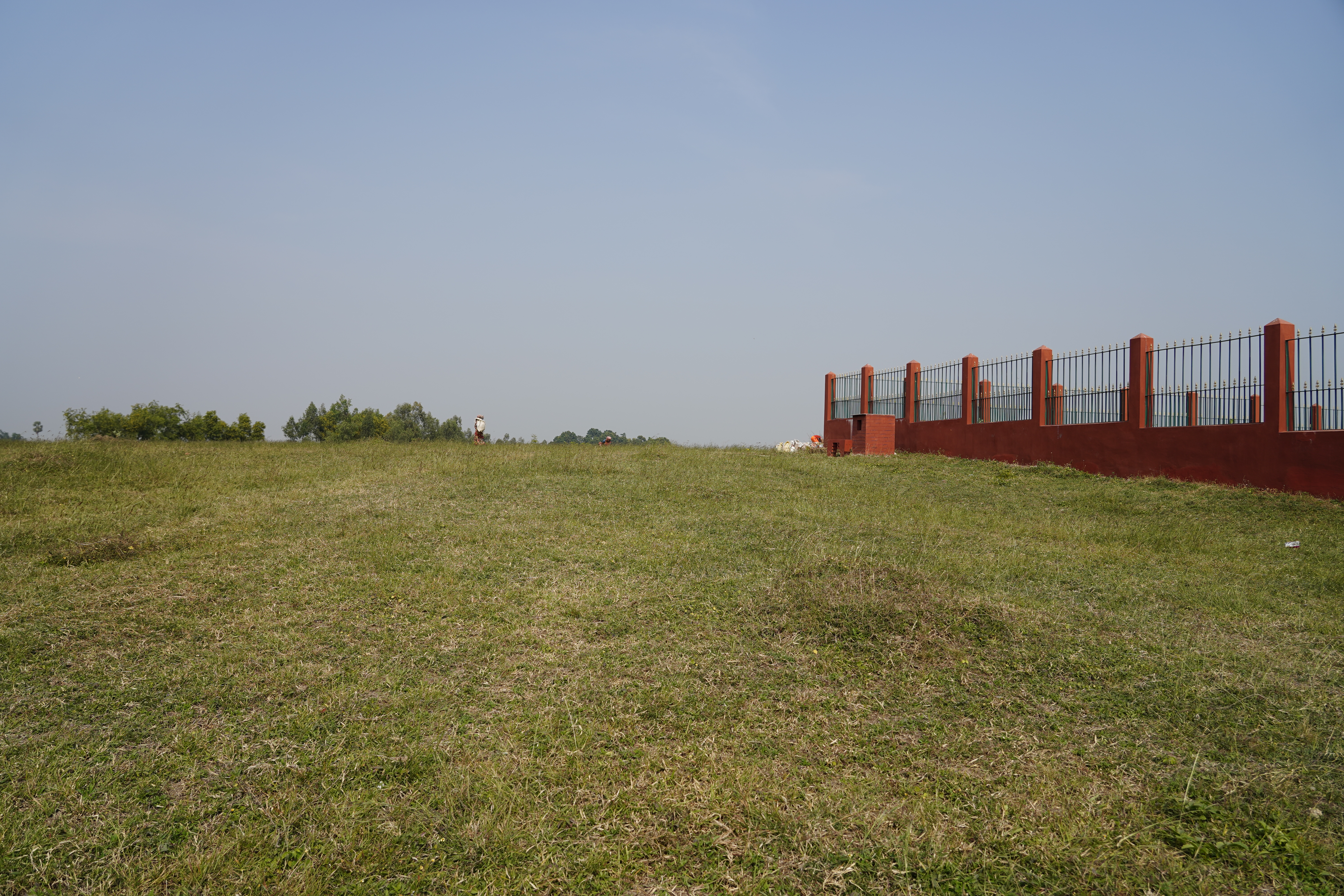
Pandu Rajar Dhibi (mound); iron sickles used by the Bengal's early agricultural communities have been found here.

The soil of this region was very fertile for rice cultivation and the rainfall was fairly good. The agricultural Communities of this area were more focused on agriculture than animal husbandry. The residents were engaged in two different occupations. On the one hand their agrarian environment had developed an agricultural livelihood, which on the other hand their semi-urban environment forced them to cater to urban needs.

The archaeological sites excavated in the region are Pandu Rajar Dhibi (mound), Mangalkot, Baneshwardanga and Pokharna. Iron sickles from Pandu Rajar Dhibi (mound) and axes and adze discovered from Mangalkot provide evidence of agriculture and agricultural economy. The objects excavated from this area such as vases, large drinking vessels, small stone beads, ivory combs, lockets, beads, ear-rings, surma sticks etc. clearly indicate the civil life.

=== New alluvial area ===
This area is part of the plain delta region of Lower Bengal. The soil here was fairly viable for a stable agricultural economy. The settlements were mainly built on the banks of Bhagirathi and Rupnarayan rivers. The main settlement in this region is Tamralipta.

A Chalcolithic (Copper Age) farming culture site has been discovered by University of Calcutta's Department of Archaeology at Erenda in coastal West Bengal, which was developed by Bengal's early agricultural communities.

== Bibliography ==
- Datta, Asok (1988). "Chalcolithic Culture in West-Bengal - A study on Settlement And Transition". Historical Archaeology of India. New Delhi.
- "Black and Red ware Culture in West-Bengal". Journal of Bengal Art. 4. 1995.
- "Bengal and South-East Asia - Early Trade and Cultural Contacts". Journal of Bengal Art. 1998.
- Ray, Amita (1991). Asok Datta (ed.). "Chalcolithic Culture in West-Bengal". Studies in Archaeology. New Delhi.
