= Siege of Bharatpur =

Siege of Bharatpur may refer to these battles in Bharatpur, Rajasthan, India:

- Siege of Bharatpur (1805), Bharatpur–Maratha defensive victory against the British East India Company
- Siege of Bharatpur (1825–1826), British East India Company victory against the Kingdom of Bharatpur

== See also ==
- Bharatpur (disambiguation)
