= Gandheswari River =

Coordinates: 22°54′36″N 87°10′42″E

Location
- Country: India
- State: West Bengal

Physical characteristics
- Mouth: Dwarakeswar River
- Length: 32 km (20 mi)
- Discharge
  - location: Dwarakeswar River

Gandheswari River is a left tributary, 32 kilometres (20 mi) long, of the Dwarakeswar River and flows in Bankura district in the Indian state of West Bengal. Flowing south-west of Susunia Hill and north of Bankura it joins the Dwarakeswar near Bhutsahar. It is subject to sudden flooding during rains.

== See also ==
- List of rivers of India
- Rivers of India
