= Joykrishnapur =

- Village
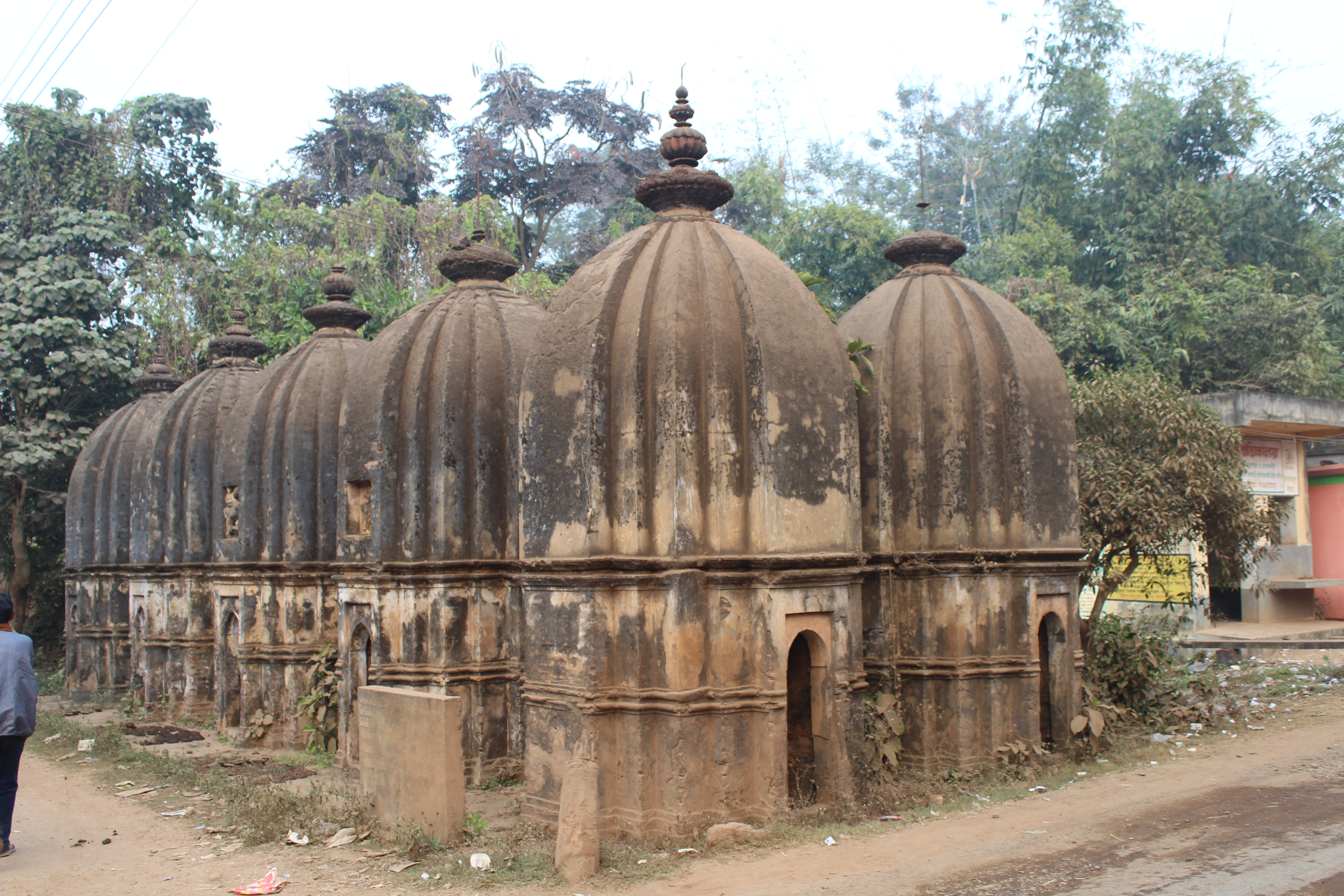
- There are about 60 to 70 'votive temples' of rekh deul pattern in Joykrishnapur

- Location in West Bengal, India Joykrishnapur (India)
- Coordinates: 23.127388°N 87.314252°E
- Country: India
- State: West Bengal
- District: Murshidabad

Population (2011)
  - Total: 2,749

Languages
  - Official: Bengali, English
- Time zone: UTC+5:30 (IST)
- PIN: 722122
- Telephone/STD code: 03244
- Lok Sabha constituency: Bishnupur
- Vidhan Sabha constituency: Bishnupur
- Website: bankura.gov.in

Joykrishnapur is a village in the Bishnupur CD block in the Bishnupur subdivision of the Bankura district in the state of West Bengal, India.

== History ==
A Garuda pillar from 12th to 13th-century was discovered at Joykrishnapur, which is a part of the Bishnupur capital, and is now preserved in the Bishnupur Museum. In addition to this, Ayudhapurusha and Sankhapurusa have been found, which are associated with symbols of Vishnu.

== Geography ==
Places in Bishnupur subdivision in Bankura district
M: Municipal town, CT: census town, R: rural/ urban centre, T: ancient/ temple centre
Owing to space constraints in the small map, the actual locations in a larger map may vary slightly

=== Location ===
Joykrishnapur is located at 23.127388°N 87.314252°E.

=== Area overview ===
The map alongside shows the Bishnupur subdivision of Bankura district. Physiographically, this area has fertile low lying alluvial plains. It is a predominantly rural area with 90.06% of the population living in rural areas and only 8.94% living in the urban areas. It was a part of the core area of Mallabhum.

Note: The map alongside presents some of the notable locations in the subdivision. All places marked in the map are linked in the larger full screen map.

== Demographics ==
According to the 2011 Census of India, Joykrishnapur had a total population of 2,749, of which 1,396 (51%) were males and 1,353 (49%) were females. There were 307 persons in the age range of 0–6 years. The total number of literate persons in Joykrishnapur was 1,788 (73.22% of the population over 6 years).

== Education ==
Joykrishnapur High School is a Bengali-medium coeducational institution established in 1963. It has facilities for teaching from class V to class XII. The school has 5 computers and a library with 1,750 books.

Swami Dhananjoy Das Kathiababa Mahavidyalaya was established at Bhara in 2009.

== Healthcare ==
Radhanagar Rural Hospital, with 30 beds at Radhanagar, is the major government medical facility in the Bishnupur CD block.

== Notable Person ==
- Maniklal Sinha
