= Kana, West Bengal =

Archaeological site

Kana
- Location within West Bengal
- 23°07′42″N 86°12′45.5″E
- Type: Settlement
- Cultures: Upper Paleolithic
- Location: Kana, West Bengal, India

History
- Built: 42,000 BCE
- Event: not known

Site notes
- Excavation dates: 1998–99 and 2012–13
- Condition: Ruined
- Owner: Public
- Public access: Yes

Kana is an Upper Paleolithic archaeological site located in Purulia district of Eastern Indian state West Bengal. The archeological site containing the microblade artefacts belongs to the Manbazar Formation of the Kumari Basin. It is situated about 500 meters northwest of Kana village at the foot of an inselberg.

It is known for remains of anatomically modern humans from Upper Paleolithic era, before 42,000 years ago.

== Archaeology ==
The first phase of excavations at Ajodhya Hills was conducted in 1998–99 under the Center for Archaeological Studies and Training. In these excavations, the Upper Paleolithic archaeological site of Kana and Mahadebbera were discovered. The second phase of excavations was conducted in 2012–13.

Archaeologists claim that this archaeological site was inhabited by Stone age people. According to the results of optically stimulated luminescence (OSL) dating of the samples obtained, Kana is the oldest archaeological settlement discovered in West Bengal. The oldest Upper Paleolithic specimen from West Bengal has been recovered from Kana, which is 42,000 years old.

== Excavated Kana ==
The archaeological site is spread over 22,500 square meters at the foothills. A ~5–6 m thick reddish-brown soil-silt layer is seen in the archeological site. Archaeological remains are found in a layer of gravelly silty sand; below this layer a greenish-grey clayey silt layer is exposed. A portion of the archaeological site was excavated to a depth of 2.47 m, and artefacts were recovered from a depth of 1.34–1.63 m. Weapons found in excavations include various stone fragments and ferruginous or iron-manganese soft pellets. The main raw materials used to make artefacts are chert and felsic tuff, a small percentage of amphibolite and a type of black igneous rock.

== Bibliography ==
- Basak, Bishnupriya (2013). "Excavation of a microlithic site and exploration in Ayodhya hills, Purulia, West Bengal: 2011-12 and 2012-13". Pratna Samiksha. Centre for ArchaeologicalStudies & Training, Eastern India.
- Earliest Dates of Microlithic Industries (42–25 ka) from West Bengal, Eastern India: New Light on Modern Human Occupation in the Indian Subcontinent
