= Mongalkote archaeological site =

- Interactive map of Mongalkote archaeological site
- 23.5213994°N 87.833953°E
- Type: Chalcolithic Settlement
- Periods: Chalcolithic, agricultural era and medieval period.
- Location: Purba Bardhaman, West Bengal, India

Site notes
- Excavation dates: from 1986 to 1990

Mongalkote archaeological site is located in Purba Bardhaman district of West Bengal. Archeological excavations have revealed seven phases of cultural significance between 2000 BC to 1800 AD. After a detailed study of all the finds from this region, it has been possible to determine seven levels of human settlement. Period I represent the Chalcolithic era; Period II agricultural era; Period III is the Maurya-Sunga period; Period IV relates to the Kusana period; Period V is the Gupta era; And Periods VI and VI are the medieval period.

== Location ==
It is situated on the right bank of the Kunur river and 3 kilometres (1.9 mi) south of the Ajay river at Natunhat in Purba Bardhaman district. The archaeological site is geographically located at 23 degrees 31 minutes north latitude and 87 degrees 53 minutes east longitude.

== History ==
Historian R. D. Banerji came to this place in 1915 AD, but no excavation was undertaken at that time. Ekadi Das approached the Director of Archeology Department, Government of West Bengal in 1962 AD and gave him some copper coins, which are now preserved in the Ashutosh Museum. Finally, a series of excavations were conducted from 1986 AD to 1990 AD, University of Calcutta's Department of Archeology participated in the excavation.
