= Pandu Rajar Dhibi =

Archaeological site in West Bengal, India

- Location within West Bengal
- 23°34′19″N 87°38′59″E
- Type: Settlement
- Periods: Chalcolithic period
- Location: West Bengal, India

History
- Built: 1600 BC or earlier

Pandu Rajar Dhibi in the valley of the river Ajay is an Archaeological site in Ausgram II block in the Sadar North subdivision of Purba Bardhaman district in the Indian state of West Bengal. It was the first Chalcolithic site discovered in West Bengal. It was excavated by a team led by Paresh Chandra Dasgupta. The common man believes that the main mound at Pandu Rajar Dhibi is associated with King Pandu mentioned in the epic Mahabharata, hence the name came into being from the folklore .

== Geography ==
Cities and towns in the Bardhaman Sadar North subdivision of Purba Bardhaman district
M: municipal city/ town, CT: census town, R: rural/ urban centre, H: historical site, W: river project, C: craft centre
Owing to space constraints in the small map, the actual locations in a larger map may vary slightly

=== Location ===
It is located near the southern bank of Ajay River and excavations have been made near Rajpotdanga and Panduk villages.

== Excavations ==
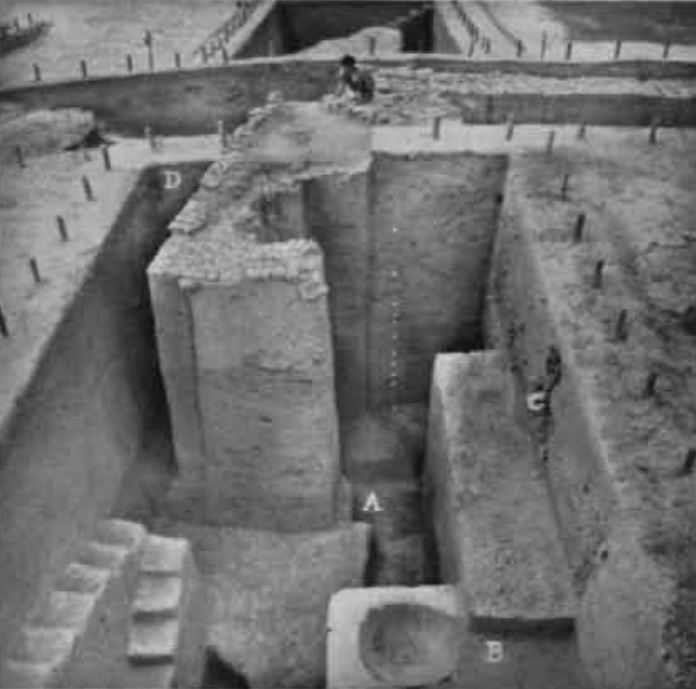
An excavated site at Pandu Rajar Dhibi.

The site was first excavated by Paresh Chandra Dasgupta in 1954-57. While Pandu Rajar Dhibi was the first Chalcolithic or Copper Age site to be discovered, a number of other sites have been discovered in an area spread over the districts of Birbhum, Bardhaman, Bankura and Midnapore, and interspersed by rivers Brahmani, Mayurakshi, Kopai, Ajay, Kunur, Damodar, Dwarakesvar, Shilabati, and Rupnarayan later in 1962 to 63 the archaeology department of West Bengal excavated some areas of Ajay, Kunur, Kopay in Birbhum and Bardhaman district through this excavation the archaeologists found some elements of ancient civilizations that was existed in 1500 BCE the excavated site nearest the South Bank of a river origin name as Rajar dhibi as The Scholars found its main Mound associate with the "Pandu Raja" mentioned in the Mahabharata .

There were two main periods – the Chalcolithic period around 1600 BC – 750 BC, and the Iron Age.

== The people and their culture ==
As to the artists of the Chalcolithic culture of Bengal, we are in the dark. From an examination of skeletal remains (14-male, female & children) it appears that they were long-headed and medium to tall in height.

There was perhaps a brisk maritime trade in Chalcolithic Bengal, but sufficient evidence is not available. Certainly, the river Ajay and its tributaries meeting the Bhagirathi river were navigable at that time. The excavation at Pandu Rajar Dhibi has provided evidence for the gradual growth of a Chalcolithic culture and its displacement by iron-using people. There is evidence of a great conflagration in period III, which may be considered as the transitional period. The transition perhaps led to the exit of the Chalcolithic culture and entrance of the Iron Age.

== Significance ==
The excavations at Pandu Rajar Dhibi reveal the origin of the Bengalis. The Copper Age civilisation in eastern India but also distant lands such as Crete and the Mediterranean lands. They were predominantly a seafaring people.
