= Dwarakeswar River =

Coordinates: 23°08′21″N 87°17′11″E

Dwarakeswar River Dhalkisor River
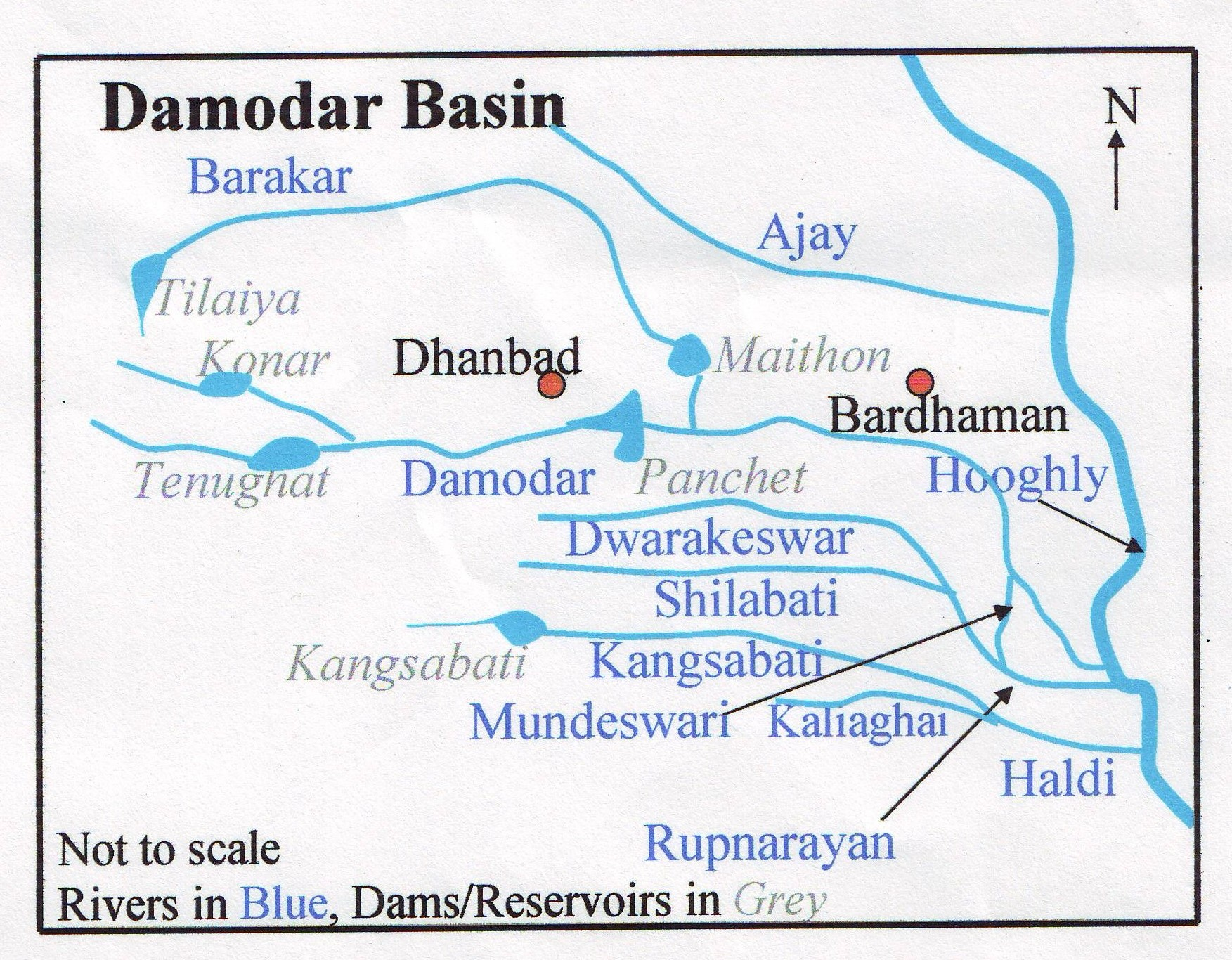

Location
- Country: India
- State: West Bengal
- City: Bankura, Arambag

Physical characteristics
- Source: Tilboni Hill
  - location: Purulia district, Chota Nagpur Plateau, West Bengal
- Discharge
  - location: Rupnarayan River

Basin features
- Tributaries
  - left: Gandheswari River, Kukhra River, Birai River
  - right: Shilabati River

The Dwarakeswar (also known as Dhalkisor) is a major river in the western part of the Indian state of West Bengal.

== Course ==
The river originates near Madhabpur in Purulia district and enters Bankura district near Chhatna. It cuts across the district, flowing past the district headquarters, and enters the southeastern tip of Purba Bardhaman district. It then passes through Hooghly District. The Dwarakeswar discharges into Rupnarayan River.

== See also ==
- List of rivers of India
