= Kalachand Temple =

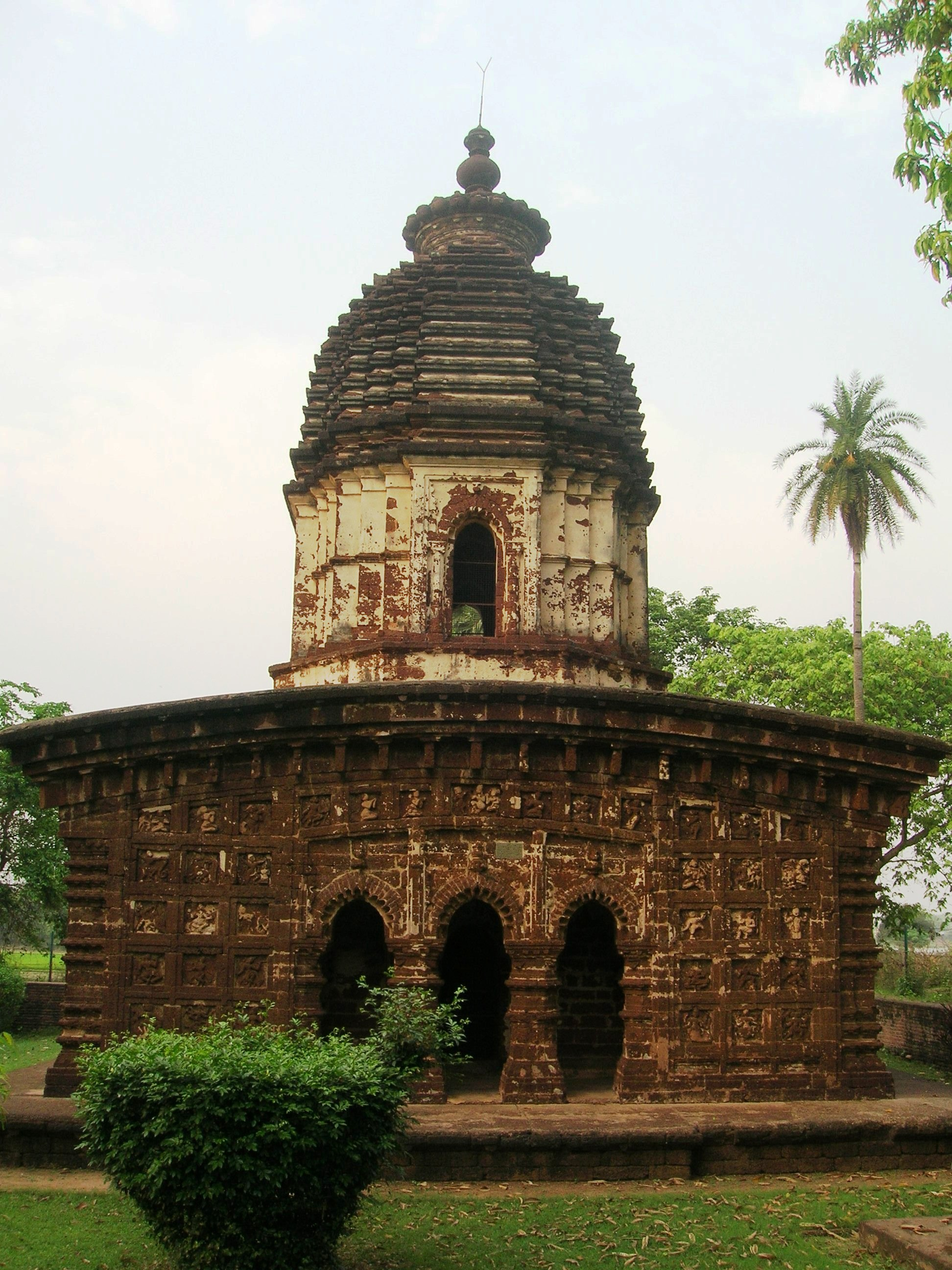

Religion
- Affiliation: Hinduism
- District: Bankura

Location
- Location: Bishnupur
- State: West Bengal
- Country: India
- Interactive map of Kalachand Temple
- Coordinates: 23°3′33.17″N 87°19′29.96″E

Architecture
- Type: Bengal temple architecture
- Style: ek-ratna style
- Founder: Raghunath Singha Dev
- Established: 1656; 370 years ago

Specifications
- Length: 11.1 m (36 ft)
- Width: 11.1 m (36 ft)
- Height (max): 9.2 m (30 ft)
- Monument of National Importance
- Official name: Kalachand Temple
- Type: Cultural
- Reference no.: IN-WB-12

Kalachand Temple, Located in Bishnupur in Indian state of West Bengal.

== History and architecture ==
According to the inscriptional plaque found in the temple, the temple was founded in 1656 by Raghunath Singha Dev King of Mallabhum. The Temple is built in the Ek-ratna style temple architecture.

The temple is about 11.1m square on plan and 9.2 m in height. The south-facing Kalachand temple stands with corridor around, with three arched openings on all four sides. The roof of the temple is curved, upon which the sikhara rises upwards and ends with an amalaka on the top. The temple is decorated with low relief carvings and the main subject is Krishna-lila. Apart from Krishna-lIlia scenes there are also representations of Pauranic deities, ascetics and dancers.

Twelve such temples are still surviving in Bishnupur, of which two are made of brick and the rest are of laterite. The earliest of the eka-ratna temples is the Kalachand temple (in laterite).

Currently, it is preserved as one of the archaeological monuments by the Archaeological Survey of India. Since 1998, the Kalachand Temple is on the UNESCO World Heritage Site's Tentative list.

== Gallery ==
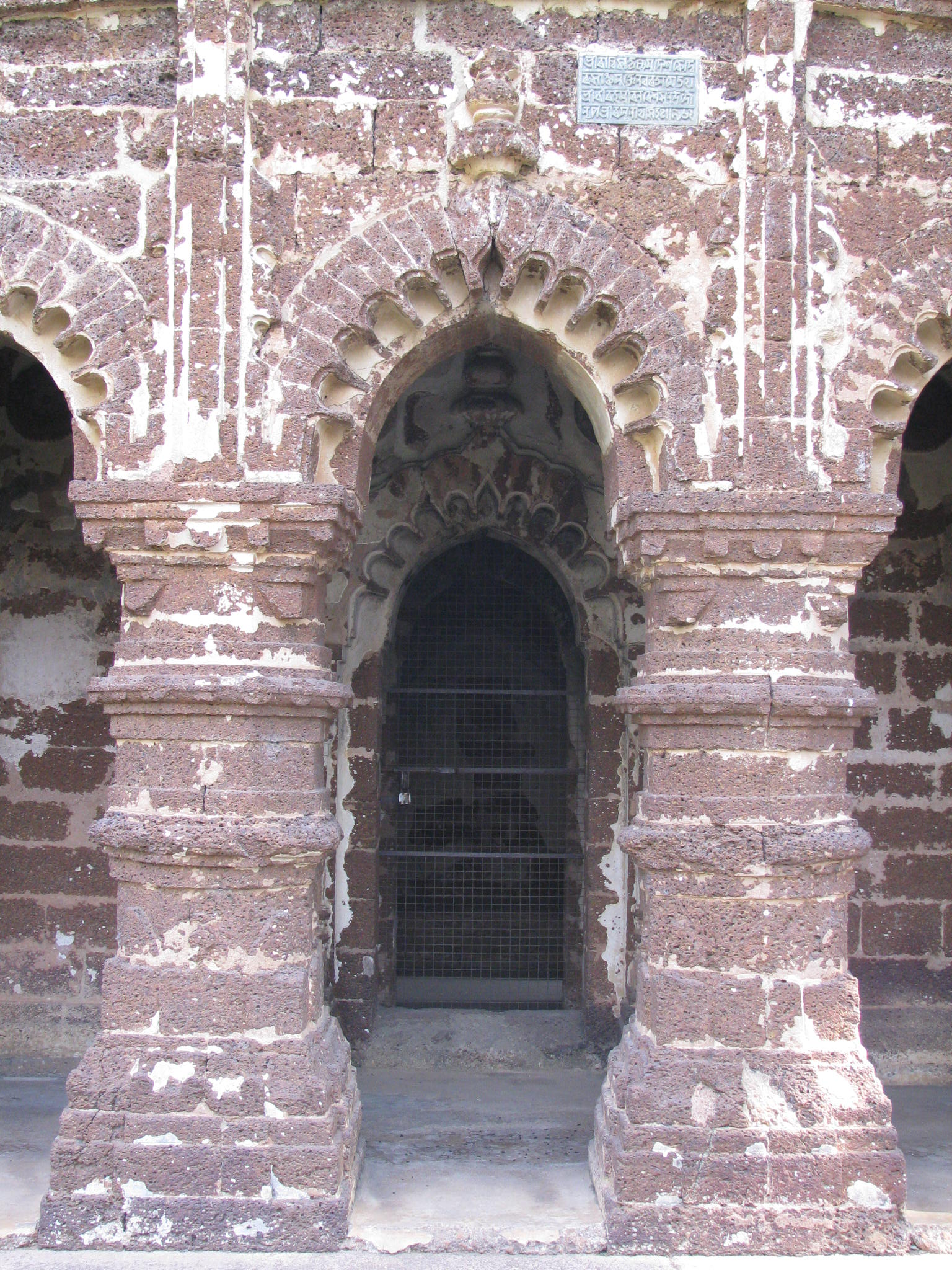

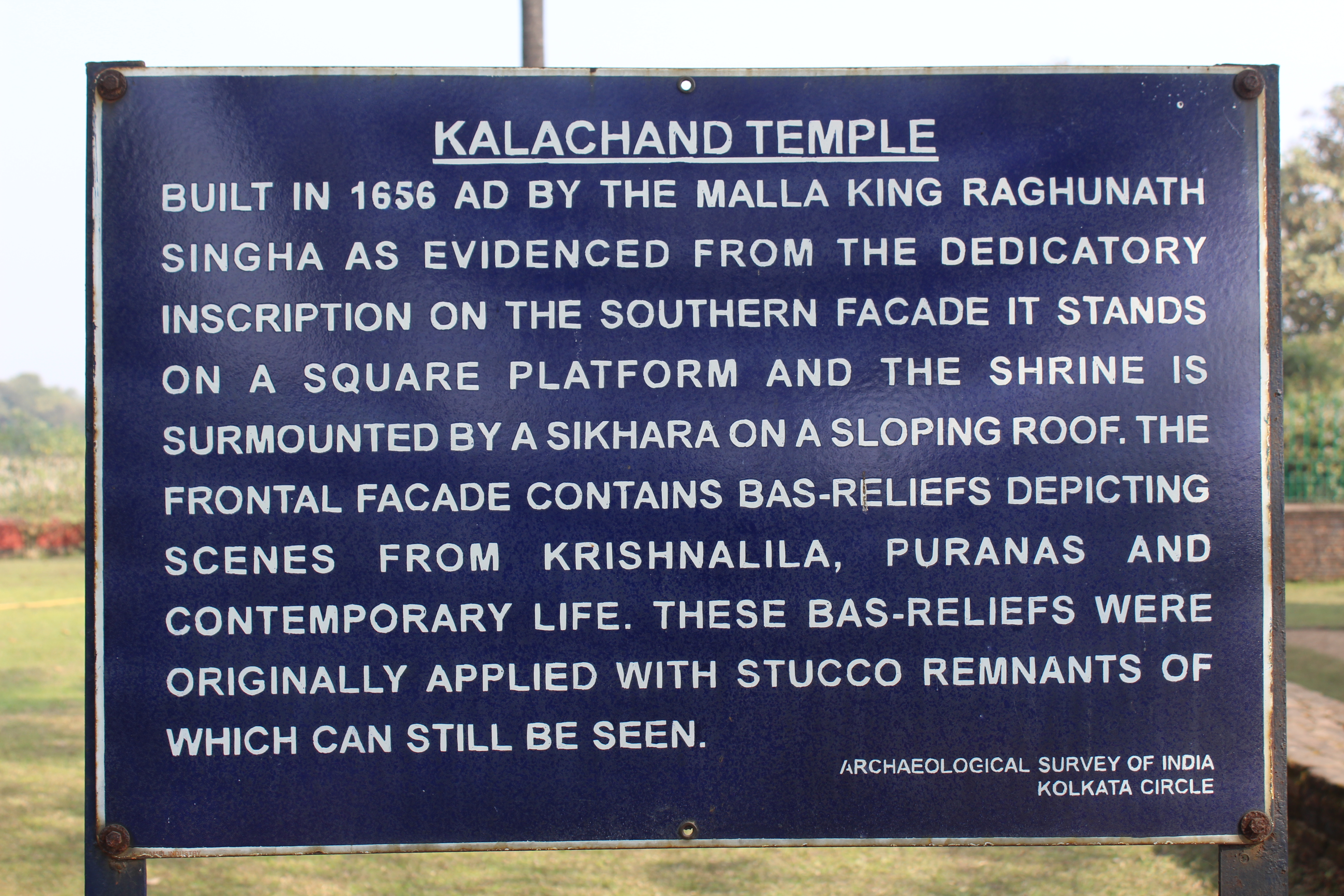

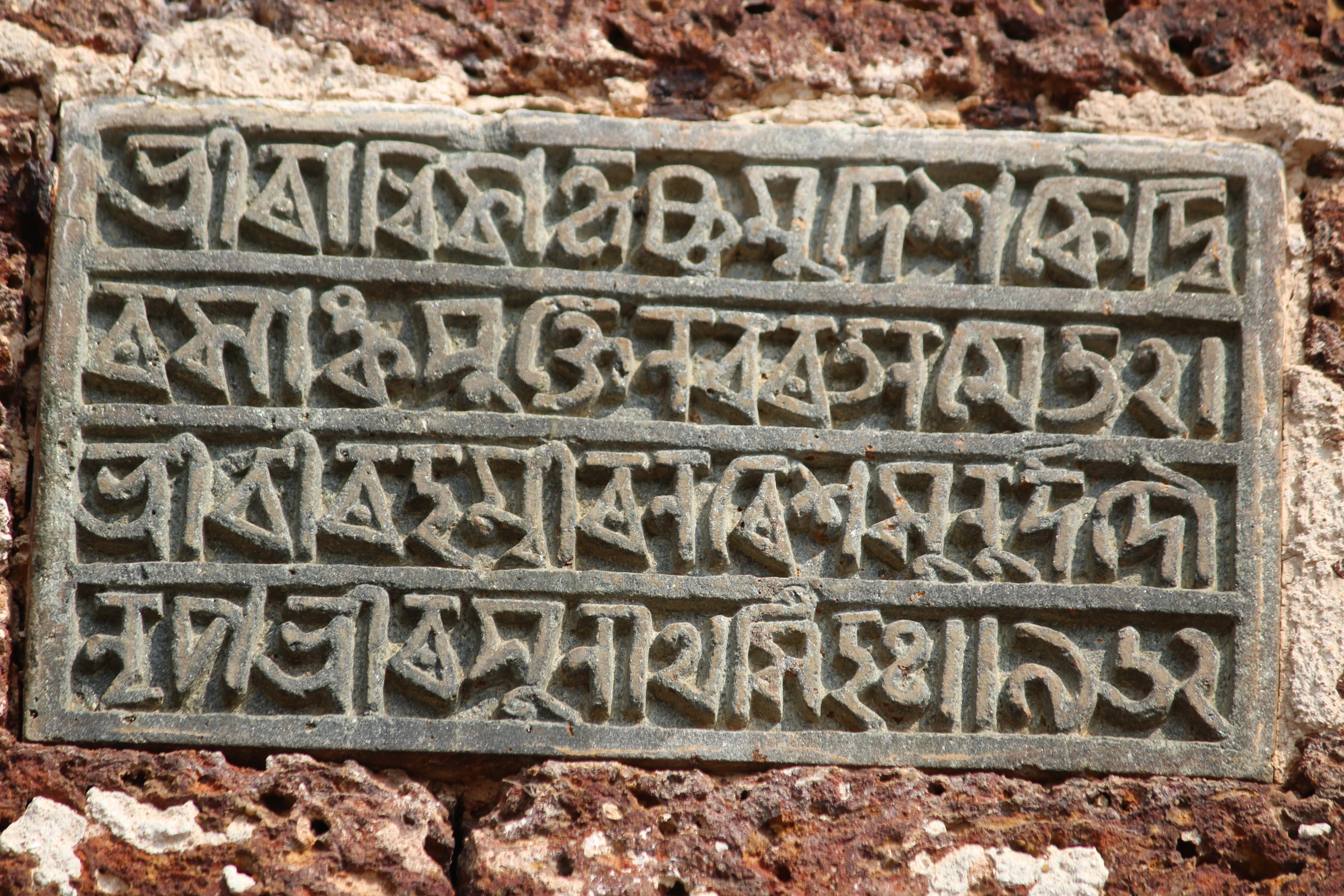

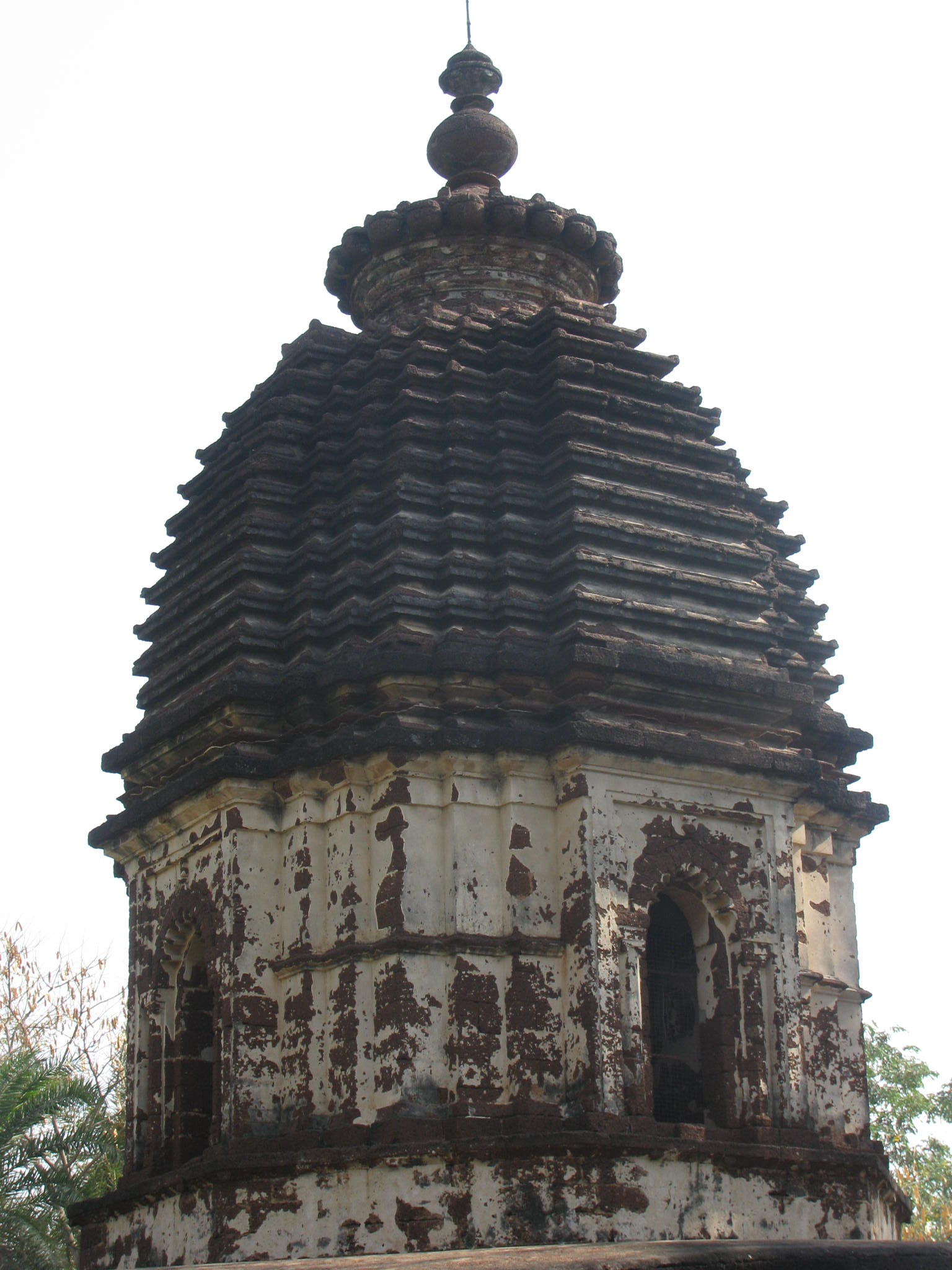

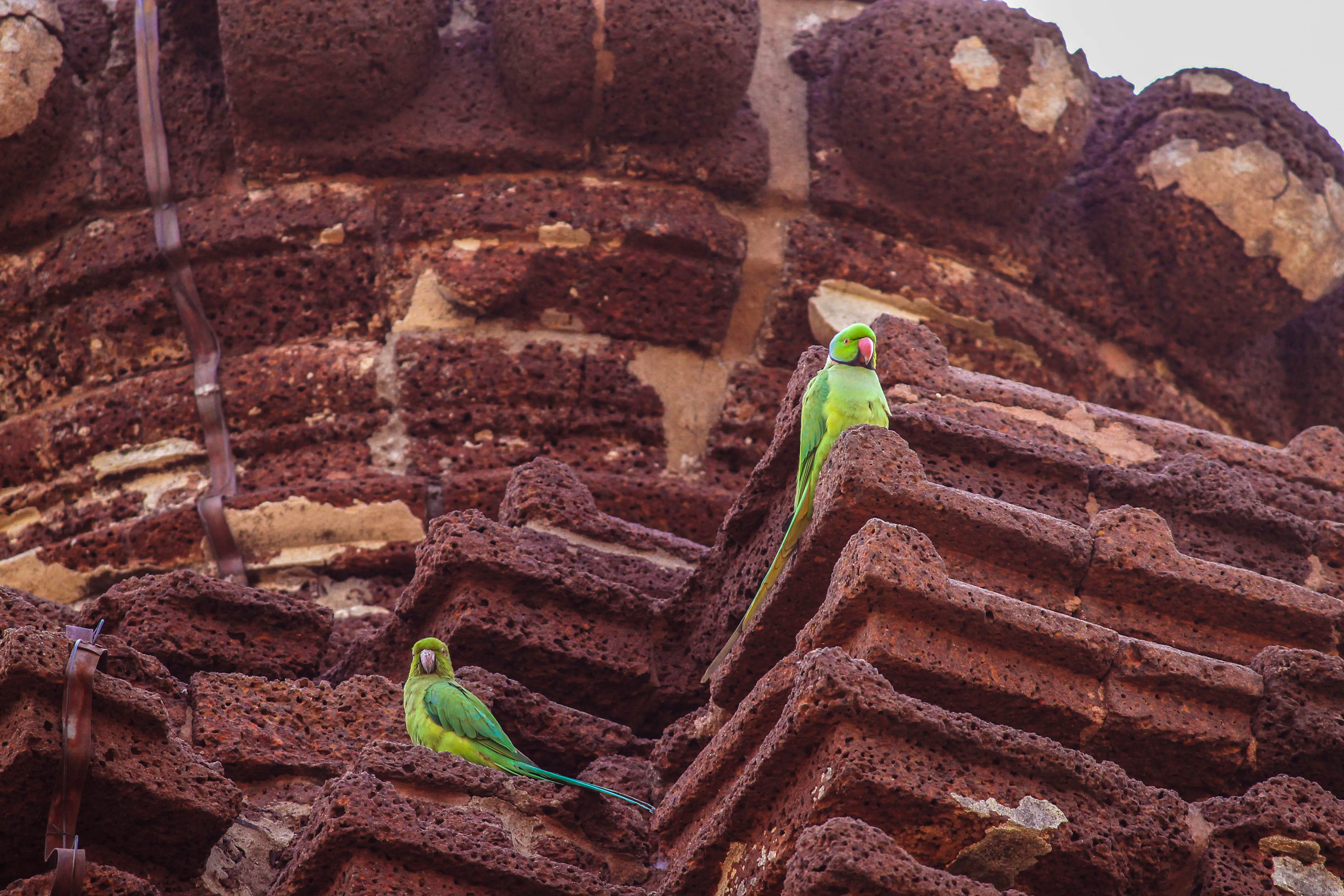

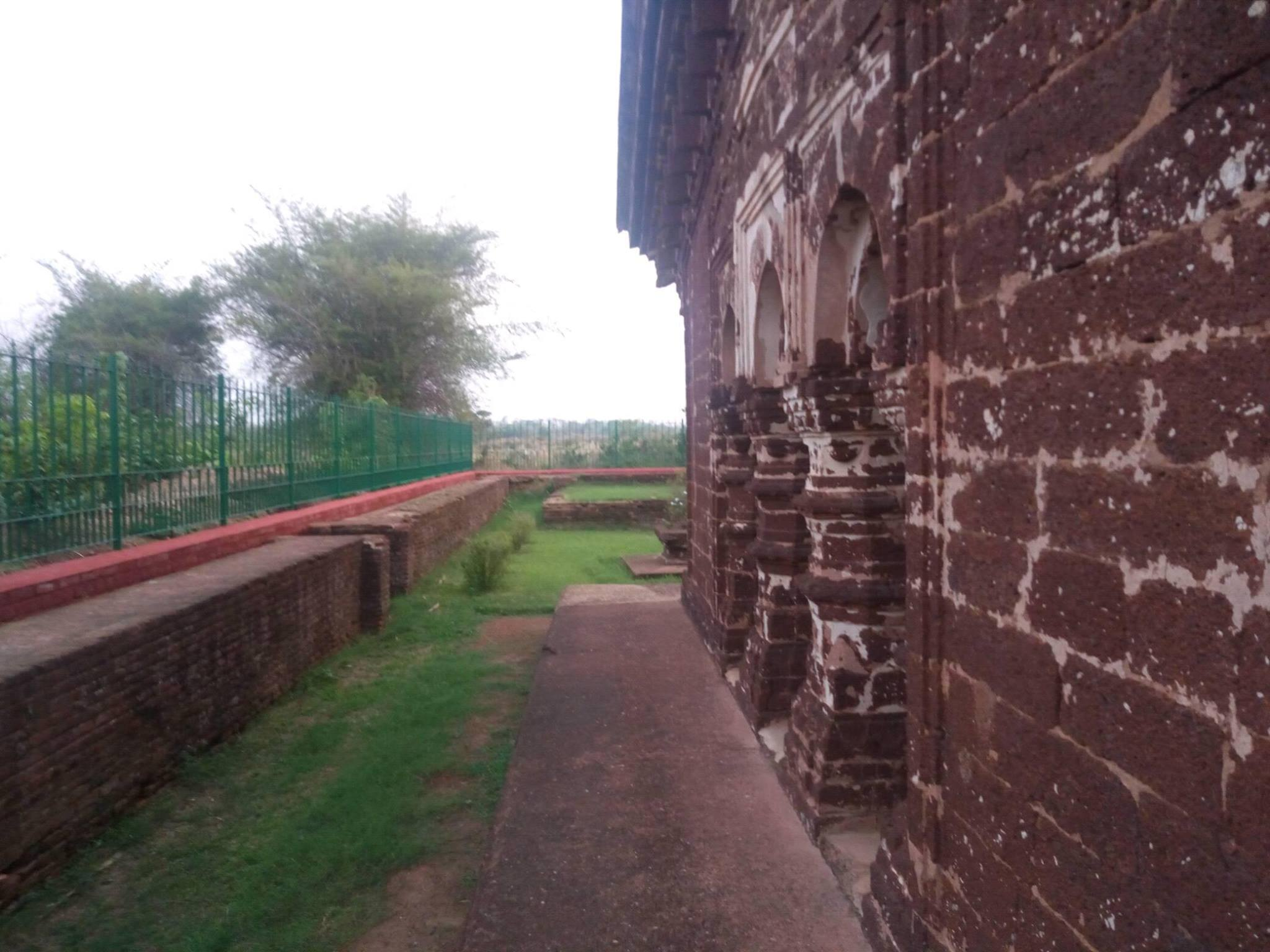

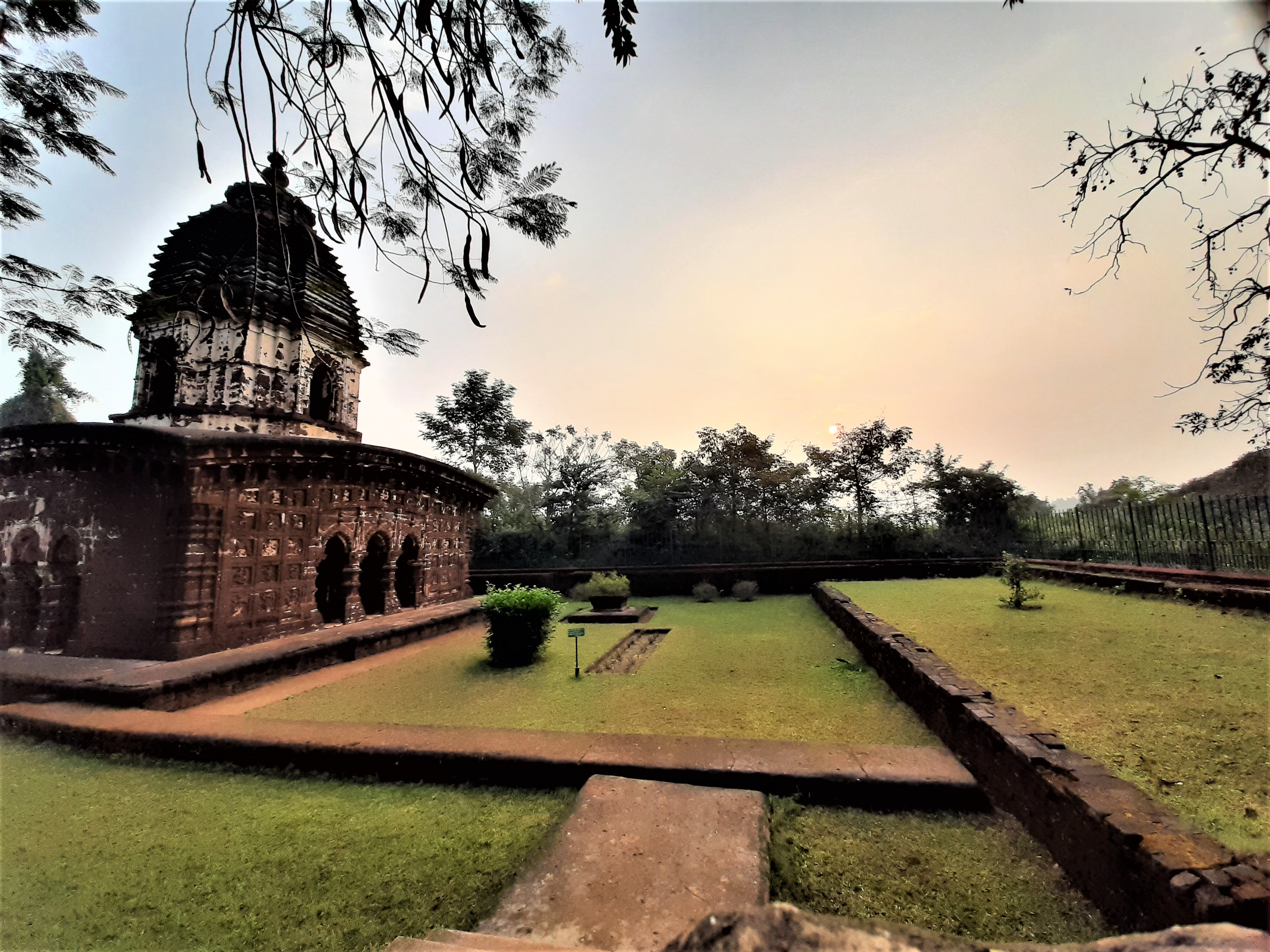

== Sources ==
- Biswas, S. S. (1992). Bishnupur (University of Illinois at Urbana-Champaign ed.). Director General, Archaeological Survey of India.
