= Jor Bangla Temple =

Temple in West Bengal, India

Keshto Ray Temple
- কেষ্ট রায় মন্দির
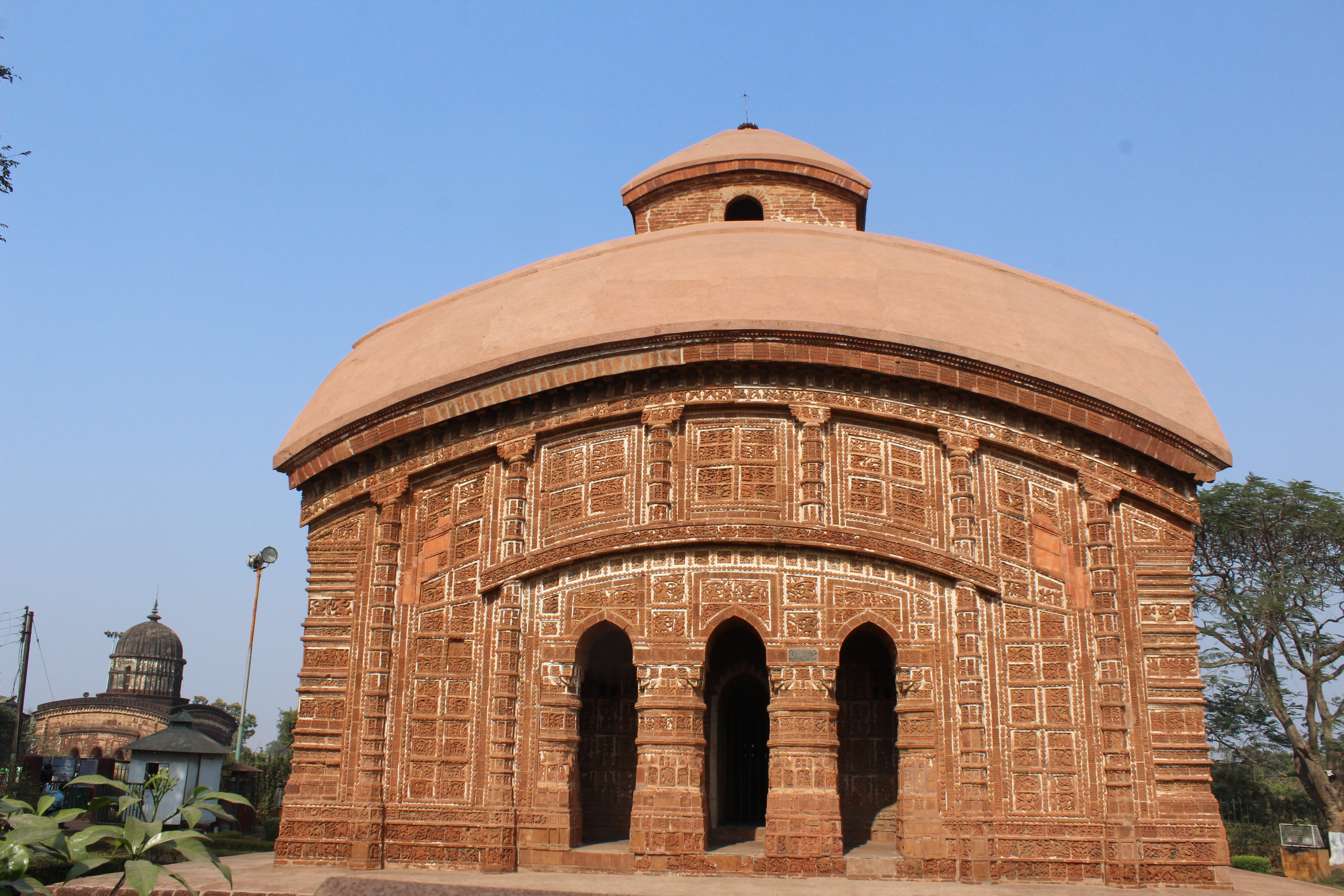

Religion
- Affiliation: Hinduism
- District: Bankura
- Deity: Keshto Ray (a form of Krishna)

Location
- Location: Bishnupur
- State: West Bengal
- Country: India
- Interactive map of Keshto Ray Temple
- Coordinates: 23°4′18.15125″N 87°19′36.44350″E

Architecture
- Type: Bengal temple architecture
- Style: Chala style
- Founder: Raghunath Singha
- Established: 1655; 371 years ago

Specifications
- Direction of façade: South
- Length: 11.77 metres (38.6 ft)
- Width: 11.7 metres (38 ft)
- Height (max): 10.7 metres (35 ft)
- Monument of National Importance
- Official name: Jor Bangla Temple
- Type: Cultural
- Reference no.: IN-WB-11

Keshto Ray Temple, also known as Jor-Bangla Temple, is a Krishna temple at Bishnupur city of Medinipur Division. In the past, the Hindu god Krishna was worshiped as Keshto Ray in this temple. According to the Inscriptional plaque, the temple was founded by the 51st King of Mallabhum kingdom Raghunath Singha in 1655 (961 Mallabda). The temple is a great example of Jor-Bangla temple architecture, which belong to the chala style.

The temple is the largest surviving Jor-Bangla temple. It is perhaps the most well-known terracotta temple in Bengal. Currently, it is preserved as one of the archaeological monuments of India by the Archaeological Survey of India. Since 1998, the Jor Bangla temple has been on the UNESCO World Heritage Site's Tentative list.

== Architecture ==
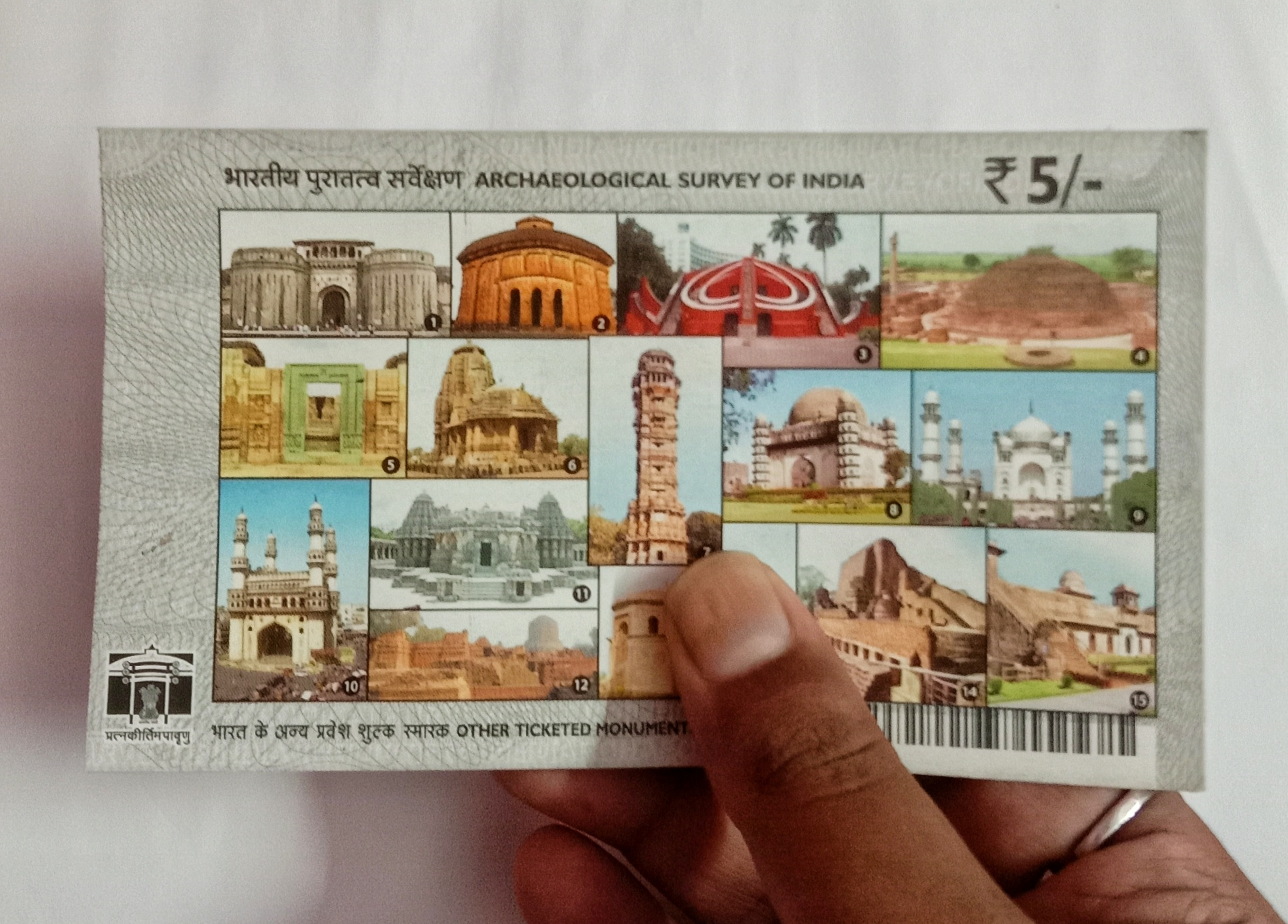
An old ticket for the heritage monuments of India, issued by the Archaeological Survey of India

A combination of Jord-Bangla, a class of chala style, and ratna style are observed in the Keshto Raya temple, but the temple is mainly built in Jore-Bangla architecture. The structure of the temple consists of two houses built in do-chal style and a ratna. The temple with its sloping roof incorporates basic elements of the Chala style, which was common in Hindu temples in Bengal built during medieval period. The exterior and interior of the temple have been beautifully protected and preserved by the Archaeological Survey of India.

The temple stands on a stone platform, measuring 15.63 metres (51.3 ft) in length and 15.67 metres (51.4 ft) in width. It measures 11.77 metres (38.6 ft) × 11.7 metres (38 ft) and stands facing south. The height of the temple is 10.7 metres (35 ft) .

=== Exterior ===
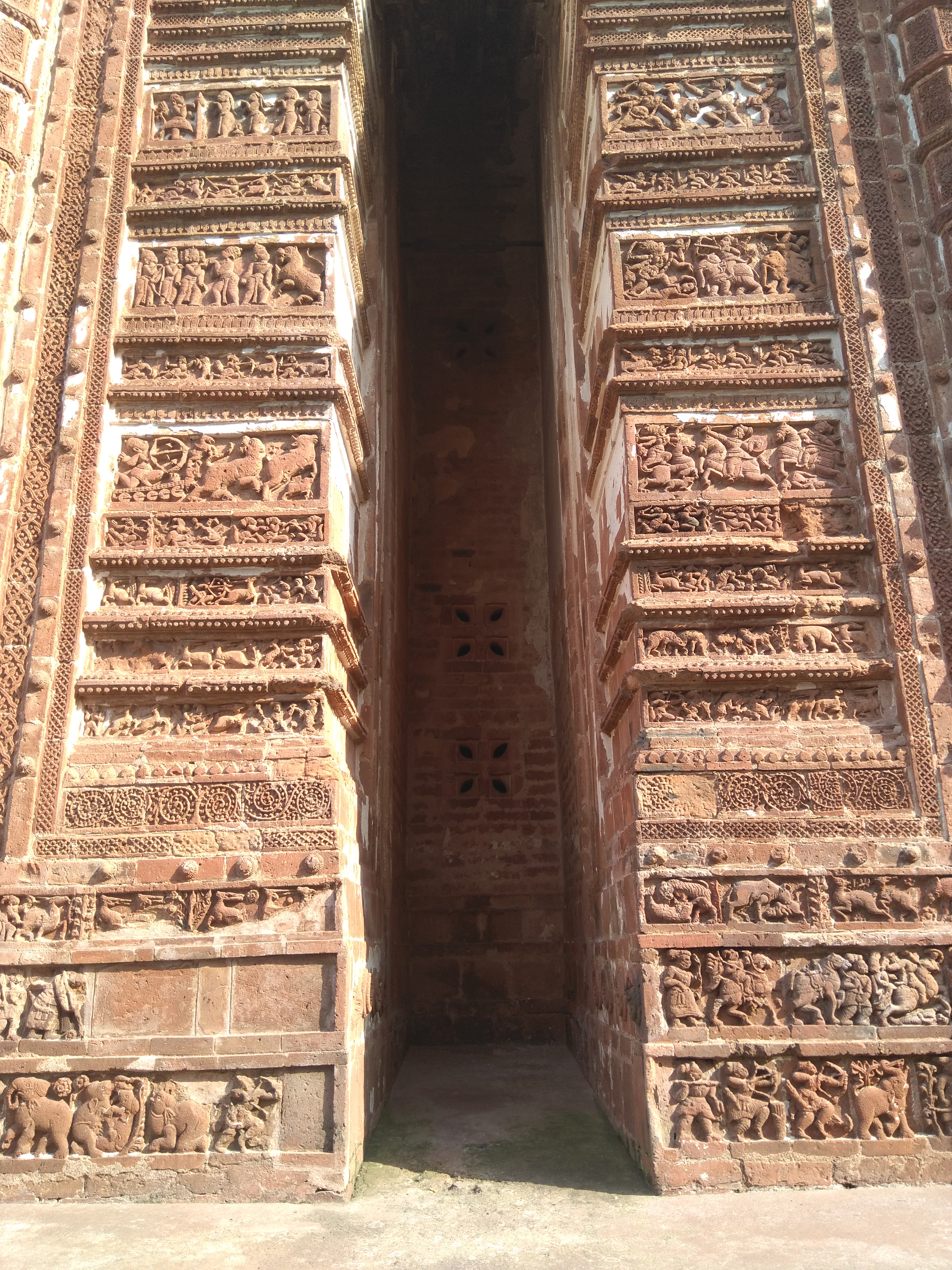
Left: The gap between the mandapa and the garbhagriha wall, Right: A column of relatively small radius on the outside of the wall.

The temple is a Jor-Bangla temple with a ratna, where two do-chala structures join to form a single continuous chala, and above the junction of the two do-chala structures is a ratna built in the Chala style. The south side chala serves as the mandapa and the north side chala serves as the garbhagriha. The temple is built on a stone platform.

The temple has three arched entrances, supported by 4 columns. The arches do not have voussoirs, a feature common to chala style temples. The northern wall of the temple also has three arches supported by 4 columns, but each arch is closed from the inside by a pseudo-wall. The northern wall's arches were not built as entrances or exits, rather, to enhance the beauty of the temple by keeping it similar to the southern wall or facade. Apart from the columns forming the arches, the outer walls of the temple have 16 columns of relatively small radius. Besides, a total of 4 columns are found on the wall, two each above the south and north arches. From a distance, it appears as though columns of relatively small radius support the roof (chala) cornice.

Although the two do-chala house i.e. mandapa and garbhagriha are connected to each other by chala or roof, structurally they are not connected to each other by walls. There is a gap of 0.75 m (2.5 ft) between the walls of the mandapa and the garbhagriha.

There is a square platform built of bricks in a V-shaped valley between the tops of the two chala, which has a ratna or pinnacle on it. Consisting of char-chala, the ratna is constructed in the Chala style.

=== Interior ===
There are three arched gateways to enter the interior of the temple, which are located on the south facing facade. The interior of the temple consists of two rooms, respectively - the mandapa and the garbhagriha. Gateways provide access to the mandapa. The two walls, 0.75 m (2.5 ft) apart, each have an arch, and the two arches are connected to each other by brick walls; as a result, the mandapa and the garbhagriha are connected to each other by a closed passage.

== Sources ==
- Ray, Mrinmoyee (2016). "Icon - NMI Journal of History of Art, Vol lt 2016". NMI Journal of History of Art. Delhi.
