= Dhari Hambir Malla Dev =

Raja of Mallabhum from 1620 to 1626

50th king of the Mallabhum
- Reign: 1620–1626
- Predecessor: Hambir Malla Dev
- Successor: Raghunath Singha Dev
- Issue: Kalaram Singha Dev
- Religion: Hinduism

Dhari Hambir Malla Dev, also known as Dhari Hambeera, was the fiftieth king of the Mallabhum. He ruled from 1620 to 1626 CE.

== History ==
=== Personal life ===
Dhari Hambir Malla Dev had only one son named Kalaram who was deaf and mentally disabled. This son was unable to run a state.

== Mallabhum temples ==
During his regime a Siva temple named Maleshwar temple was established.

== Sources ==
- Dasgupta, Gautam Kumar; Biswas, Samira; Mallik, Rabiranjan (2009), Heritage Tourism: An Anthropological Journey to Bishnupur, A Mittal Publication, p. 20, ISBN 978-8183242943
