= Bir Hambir =

Raja of Mallabhum from 1565 to 1620

Hambir Malla Dev

49th king of Mallabhum
- Reign: 1565–1620 AD.
- Predecessor: Dhari Malla
- Successor: Dhari Hambir Malla Dev
- Issue: Dhari Hambir Malla Dev, Raghunath Singha Dev
- Religion: Hinduism

Hambir Malla Dev (also known as Bir Hambir, Beera Hambeera, and Veer Hambir) was the forty-ninth king of Mallabhum, primarily in the present Bankura district in Indian state of West Bengal. He ruled from 1565 to 1620 AD.

== Personal life ==
Hambir was the 49th ruler of the Malla dynasty who flourished around 1586 AD and ruled in the 16th-17th century and was a contemporary of the Mughal emperor Akbar. He fought on the side of Akbar against the Afghans and paid an annual tribute to the Mughal governors of Bengal and thus acknowledged their suzerainty.

=== Bishnupur and his alliance with the Mughals ===
In the late 16th century, during Akbar’s campaign against Qutlu Khan Lohani, the Afghan ruler of North Orissa, Bir Hambir, the ruler of Bishnupur, allied with Mughal general Man Singh. Qutlu Khan had expanded his influence over Midnapore and Bishnupur, prompting Mughal intervention. Bir Hambir supported Man Singh’s son, Jagat Singh, with troops and strategic advice. However, Jagat Singh ignored his warnings and was caught off guard by a surprise Afghan attack. Displaying remarkable courage, Bir Hambir rescued Jagat Singh from the battlefield and ensured his safe return to Bishnupur. This act strengthened the alliance between Bir Hambir and the Mughal Empire. His loyalty not only protected Bishnupur but also enhanced his reputation as a wise and brave leader. Bir Hambir’s strategic decisions during this turbulent period showcased his exceptional leadership. His legacy remains a testament to his political acumen and valor. This incident is documented in the Akbarnama.

=== Baro-Bhuyan ===
Bir Hambir was a notable king of Bishnupur in the 16th century, and his reign is often linked to the Baro-Bhuyans, a group of twelve powerful landlords in Bengal. Although not one of the Baro-Bhuyans himself, Bir Hambir's role as a regional ruler put him in direct opposition to the expanding Mughal Empire. Like the Baro-Bhuyans, he sought to maintain the autonomy of his kingdom and resist central control. His military strength and strategic alliances with other local chiefs played a vital role in defending his territory from external threats, including Mughal forces.

Bir Hambir's connection to the Baro-Bhuyans lies in their shared resistance to Mughal domination. During a time when Bengal was divided among various local rulers, the Baro-Bhuyans were significant players in regional power struggles, often acting as a collective force against the Mughals. Bir Hambir's efforts to preserve the sovereignty of Bishnupur reflected the broader aspirations of the Baro-Bhuyans, making his reign an important part of the local resistance against the Mughal centralization of power in Bengal.

=== Midnapore Raj ===
In 1589 AD, with Shyam Singh's help, Isha Khan of the Lohani Dynasty killed Laxman Singh of Karnagarh and installed Shyam Singh as a puppet ruler. However, their rule was short-lived, as they were defeated by an alliance of Bhurshut, Mallabhum, and the Mughals. Laxman Singh's grandson, Raja Chhotu Roy, was then enthroned. During Bir Hambir's regime, the kingdom regained strength and stability. Bir Hambir's leadership solidified Karnagarh's power and expanded its influence.

=== Vaishnavism ===
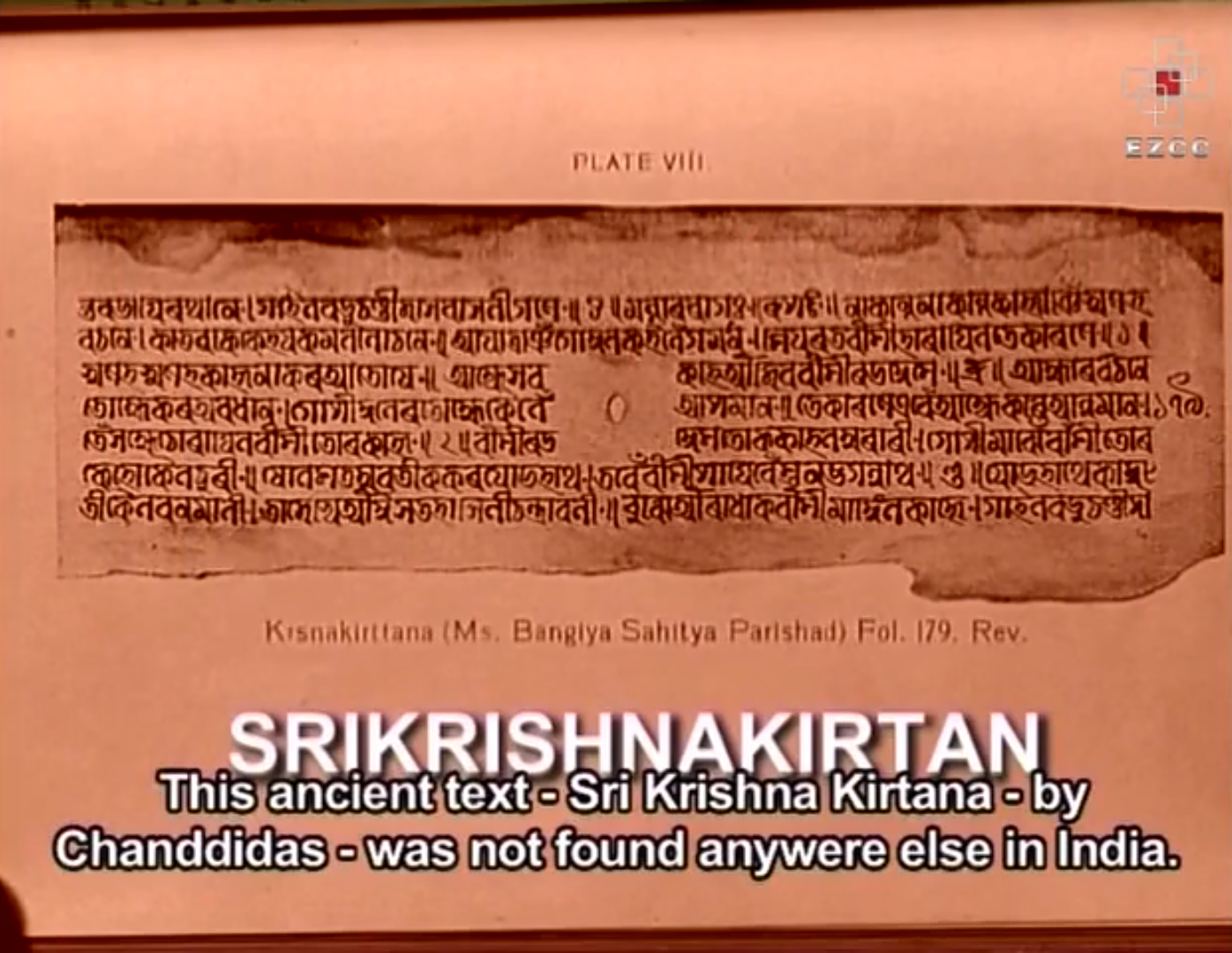
Shreekrishna Kirtana By Chandidas from Mallabhum kingdom

Bir Hambir was a pious man who started following Vaishnavism. A story in two Vaishnava works (Prem-villa of Nityananda Das (alias Balaram Das) and Bhakti Ratnakara of Narahari Chakrabarti) recounts how Srinivasa and other devotees were robbed by Bir Hambir while traveling from Vrindavan to Gaur with several Vaishanava manuscripts. However, Bir Hambir was so moved by Srinivasa's reading of Bhagavata that he converted to Vaishnavism and gave Srinivasa a rich endowment of land and money. He introduced the worship of Madan Mohan to Bishnupur.

=== Dev title ===
During his regime (1565 to 1620), Dev title was suffixed after the title Malla and Mallabhum was very safe and secured.

=== Battle of Mundamala Ghat ===
During the Pathan rule of Sulaiman Khan Karrani in Gaur, the kingdom of Bishnupur stood in a unique glory in the Rarh region of Bengal. His reckless son Daud Khan Karrani dreamed of seizing the whole of Bengal. In this situation, in 1575 AD, Daud Khan attacked Bishnupur with a large number of Pathan troops. Revered Fakir Narayan Karmakar Mahasaya writes - "Dawood Khan suddenly came and encamped at a village called Ranisagar near Bishnupur with more than one lakh soldiers and similar ammunition."

The people of Ranisagar were embarrassed by the sudden attack of Dawood Khan's army of lakhs. The Bishnupur army was still not ready for battle. At this moment, the heroic prince of Bishnupur, Hambir Malla, started the war by arming the army. The army of Bishnupur, intoxicated with the dream of victory, proceeded to subdue the enemy by worshiping the Maa Mrinmayee, the kuladevi of Mallabhum.

The state of Bishnupur had a total of twelve forts, one of which was the Mundmal fort. Near this Mundmal Garh, the Mallabhum army attacked the Pathan forces. After a fierce battle between the two sides, Hambir Malla defeated the Pathan forces in such a tragic manner that the battlefield at the eastern gate of the fort was filled with the corpses of Pathan soldiers. The defeated Dawood Khan was taken prisoner. He waited for death in a state of siege. But the noble Hambir arranged for his release and reached a safe place.

"There were so many corpses of the dead Nawab's soldiers at the eastern gate of the fort that it was called" Mundmalaghat.

It is said that Hambir Malla cut off the heads of the invading Pathan soldiers, made a garland (mundamala), and offered it as a gift to the demon-destroying Maa Mrinmayidevi. He was awarded the title of "Bir Hambir" for accomplishing that difficult task.

== Rashmancha ==
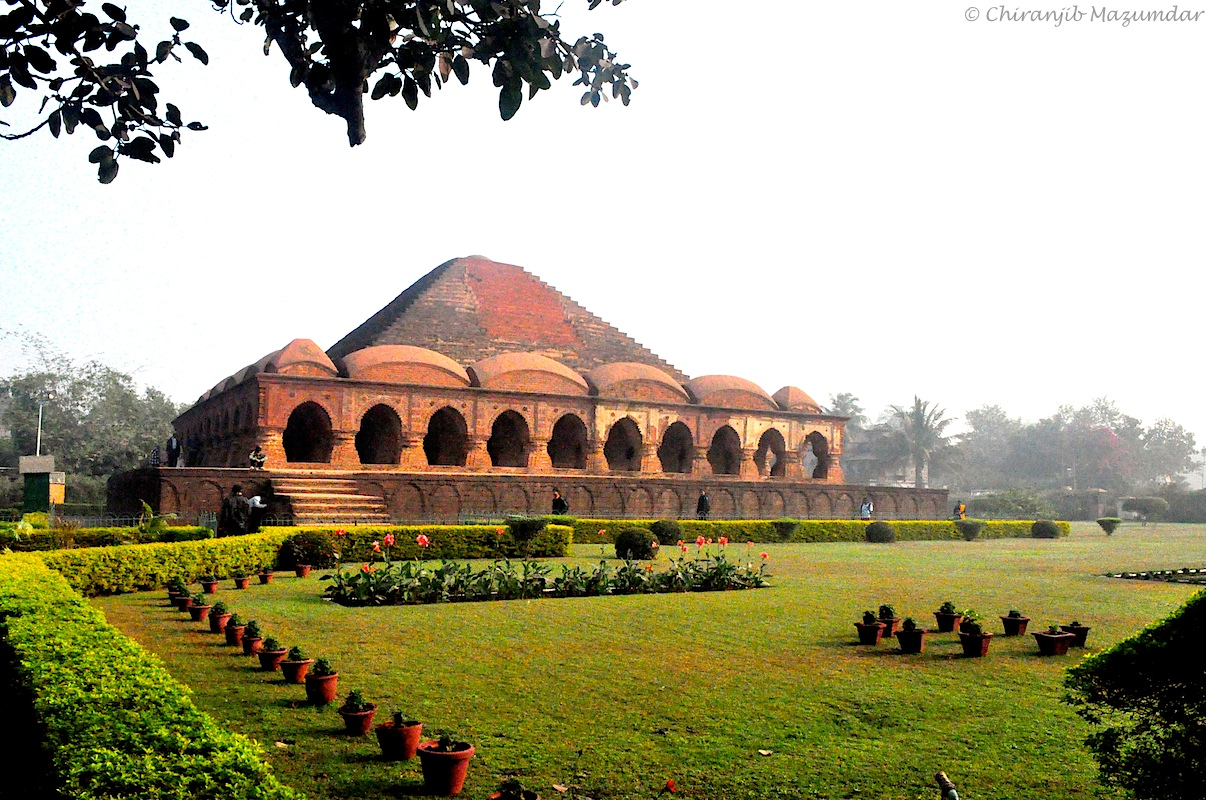

The Rashmancha is a historical building located at Bishnupur. It was commissioned by Malla king Bir Hambir in 1600 CE. During the Vaishnava Ras festival, all the Radha Krishna idols of Bishnupur town used to be brought here to be worshipped by the citizens.

== Dalmadal kaman (cannon) ==
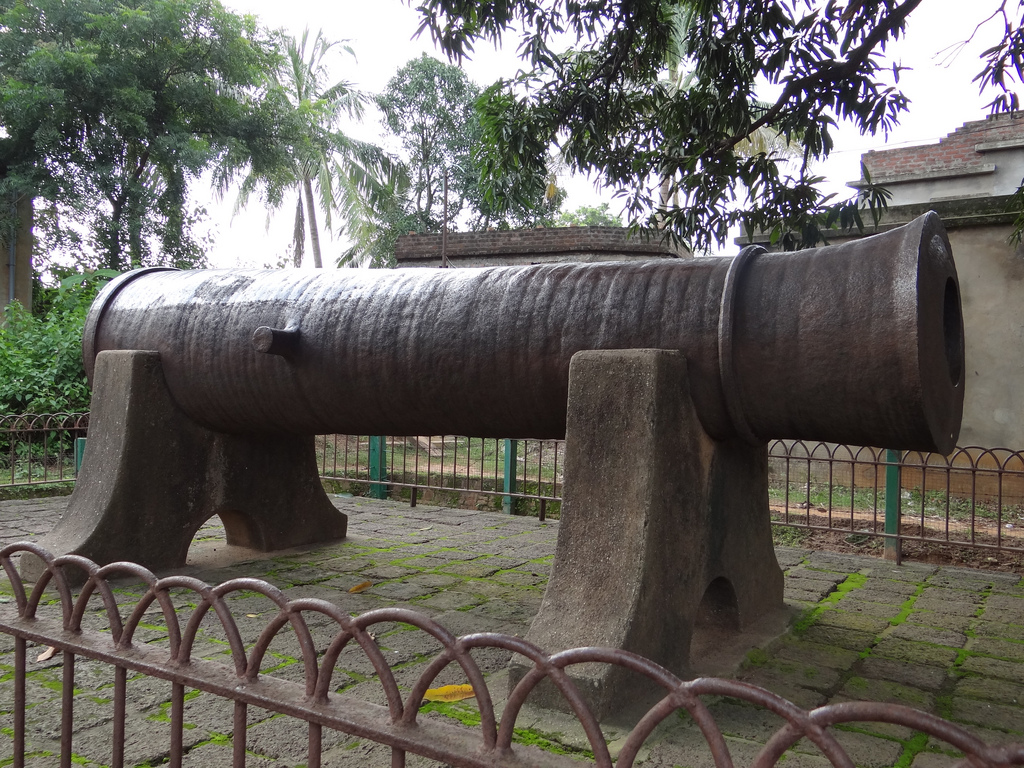

During the reign of Bir Hambir the Dal Madal, one of the largest-bored cannons ever made, was founded, demonstrating the skill of artisans of that time. Dal Madal was made by Jagannath Karmakar. "Dal Madal" means "destruction of enemy".

Historian Maniklal Sinha writes, the well-known Dalmadal of the Malla Rajas. There are distinct critiques regarding the name of the cannon. Common people think that Dal and Madal are two cannons. The concept of Sanskrit-educated people is Dalmadal, which came from the Sanskrit name Dalmardan. However, each of the above thoughts is incorrect. Mallabhum, the kingdom of Malla Rajas was dominated by Dharmathakura and a Dharamshila is known as Dalmadal. His study also suggests that the ancestor of the Karmakar family, Jagannath Karmakar who built the Dalmadal cannon and named the cannon as Dalmadal.

Dal Madal Kaman (Cannon) or Dala Mardana
Left Side of Kaman	Front Side of Kaman	Right Side of Kaman	Back Side of Kaman

== In popular culture ==
The dhrupad gharana of Bishnupur kingdom

- Eastern Zonal Cultural Centre, Kolkata, presented a video on the dhrupad gharana of Bishnupur kingdom.
- The film Bir Hambir (film) is based on his real-life story.

== See also ==
- History of Bankura district

== Sources ==
- website on Bankura
- Kumkum Chatterjee. "Cultural flows and cosmopolitanism in Mughal India: The Bishnupur Kingdom" in Indian Economic and Social History Review Vol. 46 (2009), p. 147-182.
- Dasgupta, Gautam Kumar; Biswas, Samira; Mallik, Rabiranjan (2009), Heritage Tourism: An Anthropological Journey to Bishnupur, A Mittal Publication, p. 22, ISBN 978-8183242943
- O’Malley, L.S.S., ICS, Bankura, Bengal District Gazetteers, pp. 21–46(25), 1995 reprint, first published 1908, Government of West Bengal
