= Raghunath Singha Dev =

Raja of Mallabhum from 1626 to 1656

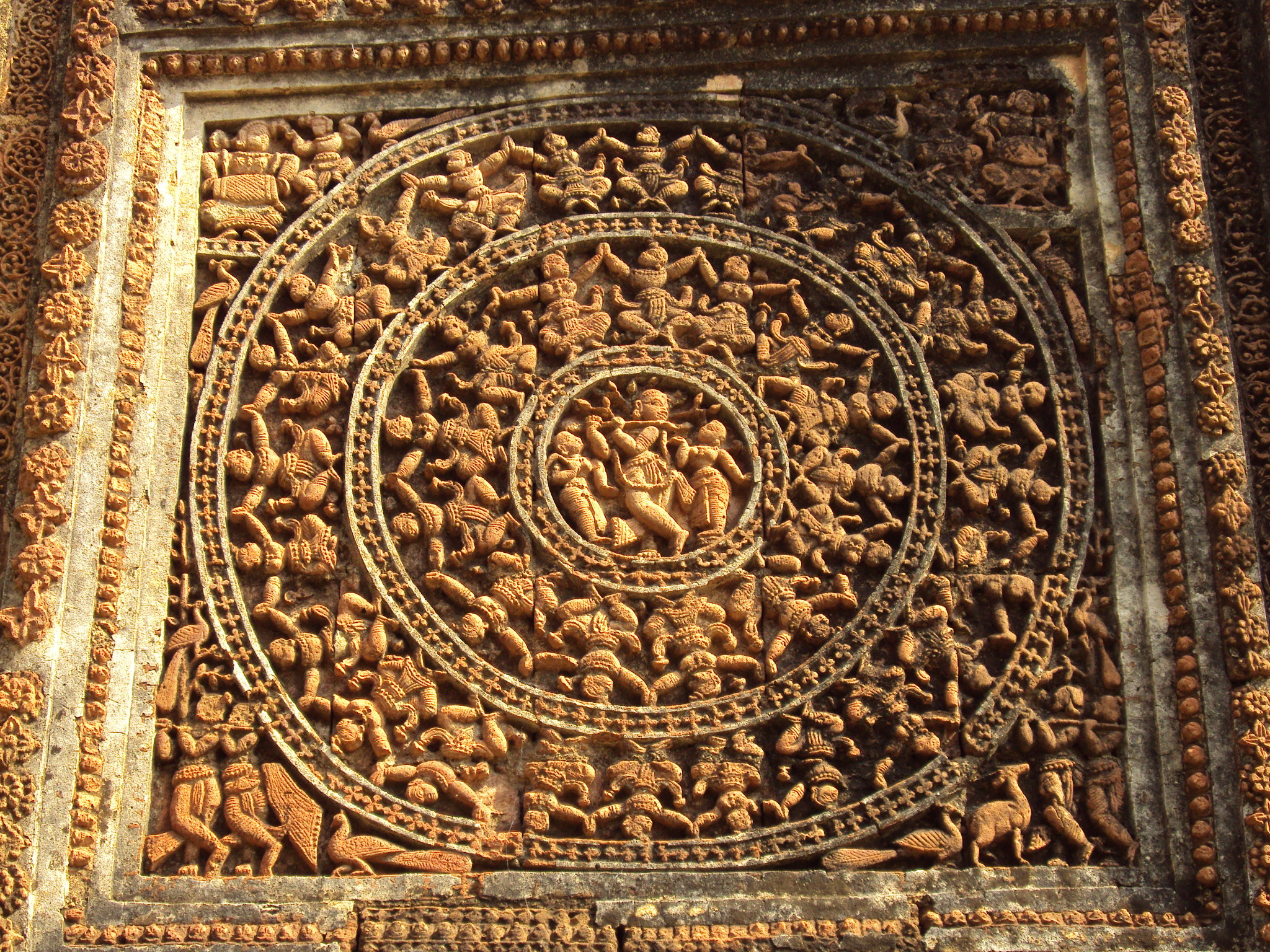
- Terracotta work on the Pancha Ratna temple dedicated to Shyamrai (Krishna) built by Raghunath Singha Dev in Bishnupur in 1643

51st king of the Mallabhum
- Reign: 1626–1656 CE.
- Predecessor: Dhari Hambir Malla Dev
- Successor: Bir Singha Dev
- Father: Hambir Malla Dev
- Religion: Hinduism

Raghunath Malla Dev, also known as Raghunath Singha Dev, was the fifty-first king of the Mallabhum (now in the Indian state of West Bengal). He ruled from 1626 to 1656 CE.

== Personal life ==
Because Kalaram, son of Dhari Hambir Malla Dev, was unfit to become a king due to his physical inability, his mother, who was Dhari Hambir's wife, enthroned her husband's young brother Raghunath Malla Dev, who later got the title of Singha.

During his regime a very friendly relationship with the Mughals meant that Bishnupur operated as a free and separate state. Public works that were completed during his reign include five sayars (large size ponds) and temples such as Jor Bangla, Shyam Rai, Kalachand and stone Chariot were built.

=== Singha title ===
The king's family got the title of Singha (pronunciation: sing-ho) as an honour due to the strength of Raghunath.

== Mallabhum temples ==
=== Jor-Bangla temple ===
Bishnupur Jor-Bangla temple, built 1655 by King Raghunath Singha Dev. It is richly ornamented with terracotta carvings. The roof has the classic chala style of Bengal architecture.

Jor Bangla Temple, Bishnupur

=== Pancha ratna temple ===
The Pancha Ratna temple (five towers) was built by King Raghunath Singha in 1643. It stands on a low square plinth and consists of an ambulatory pathway with a porch opened by three arches on the four sides of the temple. The central sikhara is octagonal, while the other four are square. The walls are richly decorated with terracotta carvings featuring aspects of Lord Krishna's life.

Pancha Ratna Temple
Pancha Ratna Temple (Deity Shyam Ray (Krishna))	One of the five Shikhars of Pancha Ratna Temple	Terracotta work on Pancha Ratna Temple

=== Malleshwar temple ===
This is another temple of laterite stone, built by Raghunath Singha Dev in 1622. It is a deul type of temple and the earliest temple of Lord Siva at Bishnupur. It is square in plan, its height is 10.7 m, and each side is 6.9 m. Its original sikhara was ekratna and have rekh deul style. An octagonal tower later replaced it. This monument is declared to be of national importance under the ancient monuments and archaeological sites and remains act 1958.

=== Shyam Rai temple ===
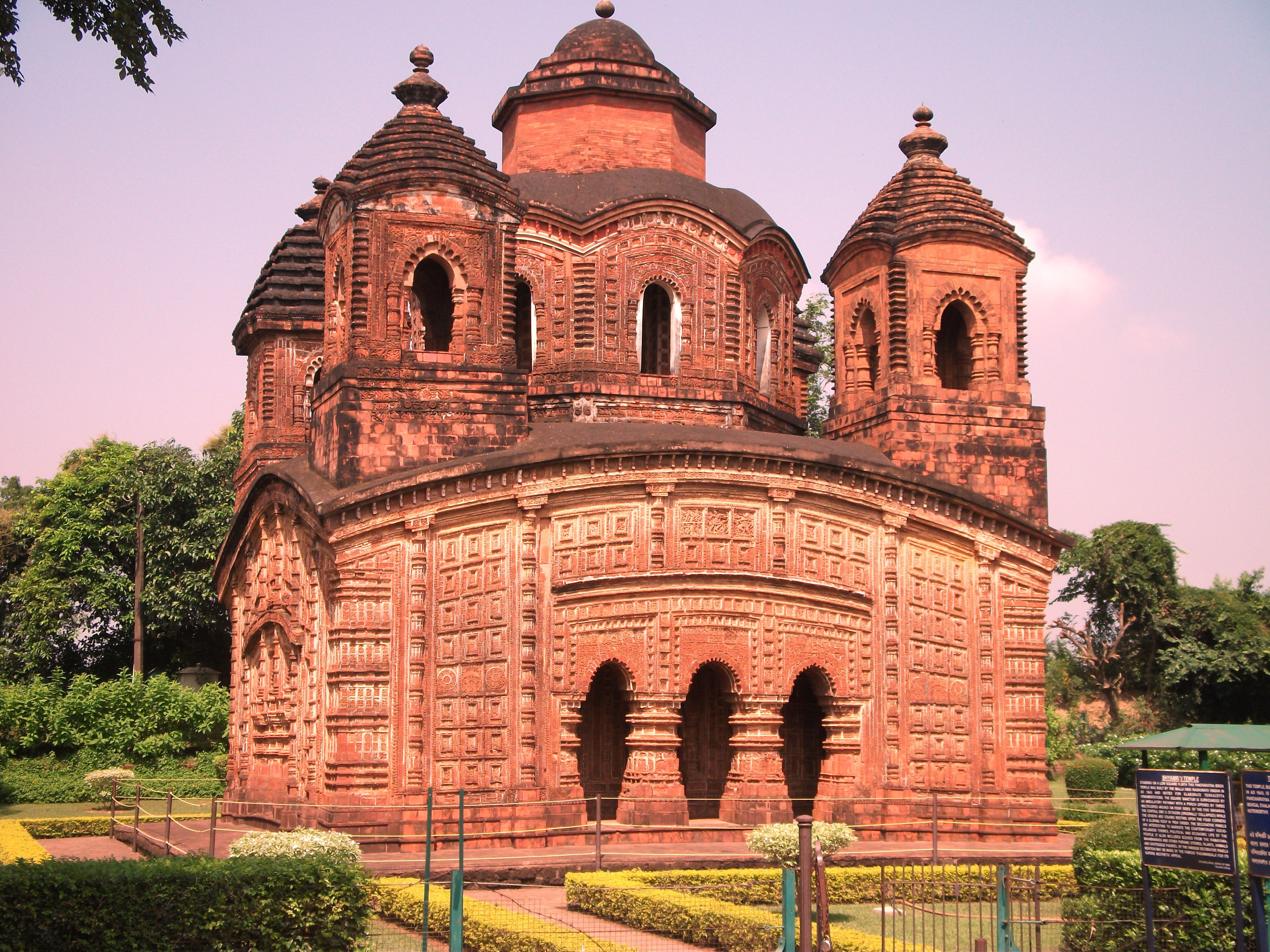

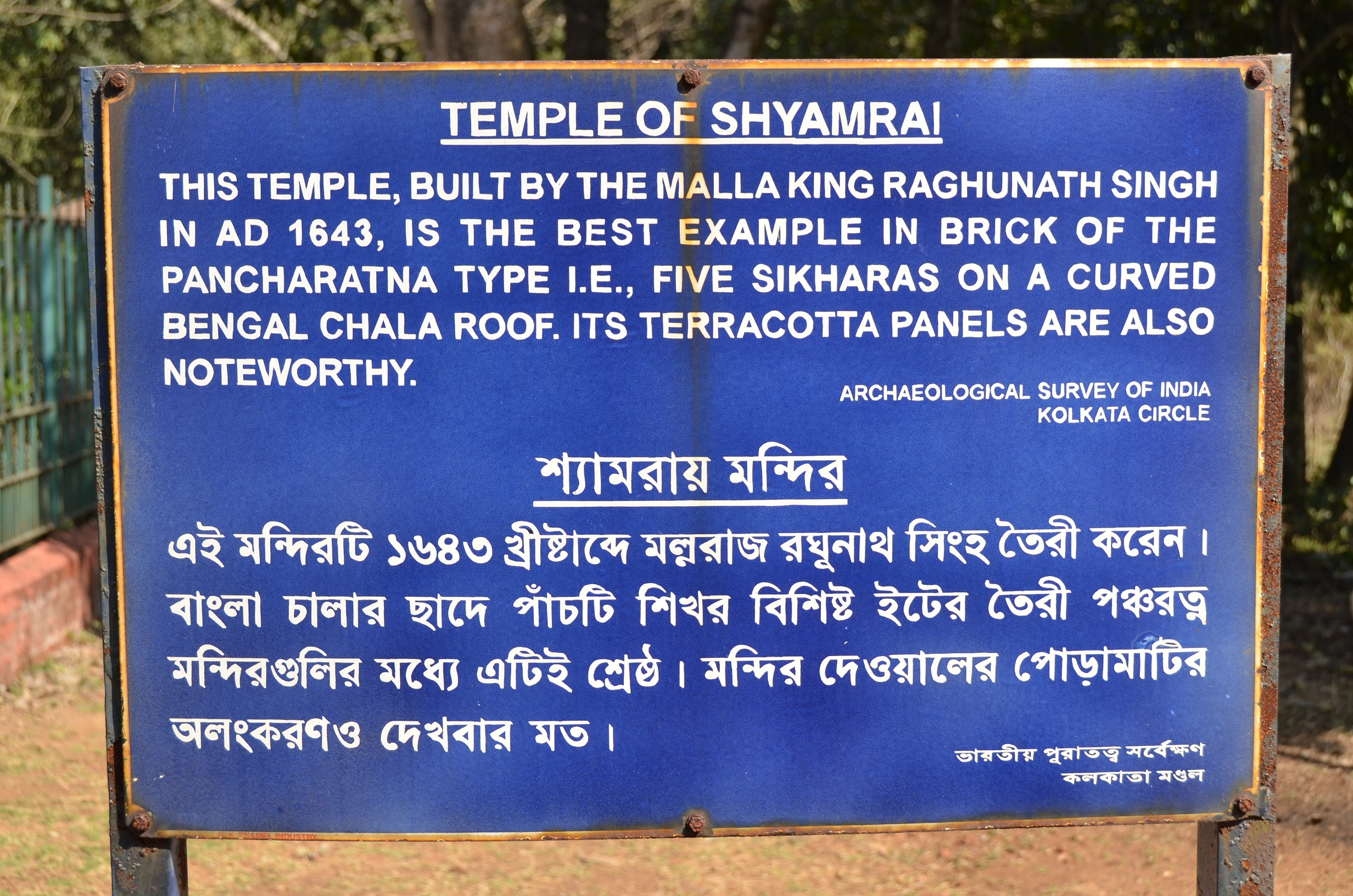

Built in 1643 by king Raghunath, Shyam Rai temple has the most intricate sculptural details amongst all the Bishnupuur temples. Shyam Rai Temple is an example of the Pancha Ratna (meaning five gems) architecture. The gems in this temple are the four small towers and one main tower that build the Temple. The architecture of this Temple is unique in its own way and is one of the highest prioritized monuments of the Archaeological Survey of India (ASI).

=== Kalachand temple ===
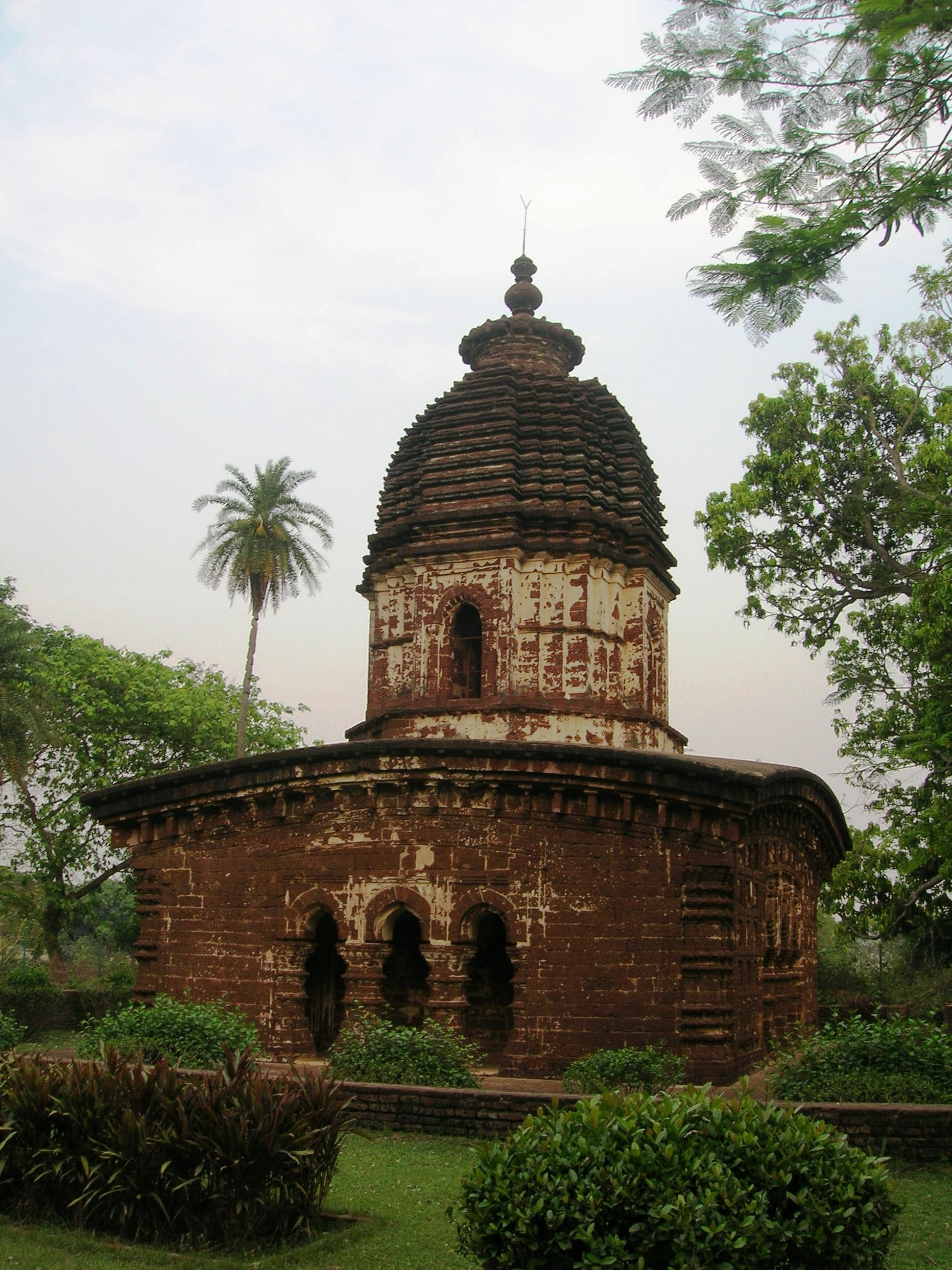

The Kalachand temple built in 1656 by King Raghunath Singha in ekratna style (one tower) with laterite stone.

== Terracotta art in Bishnupur ==
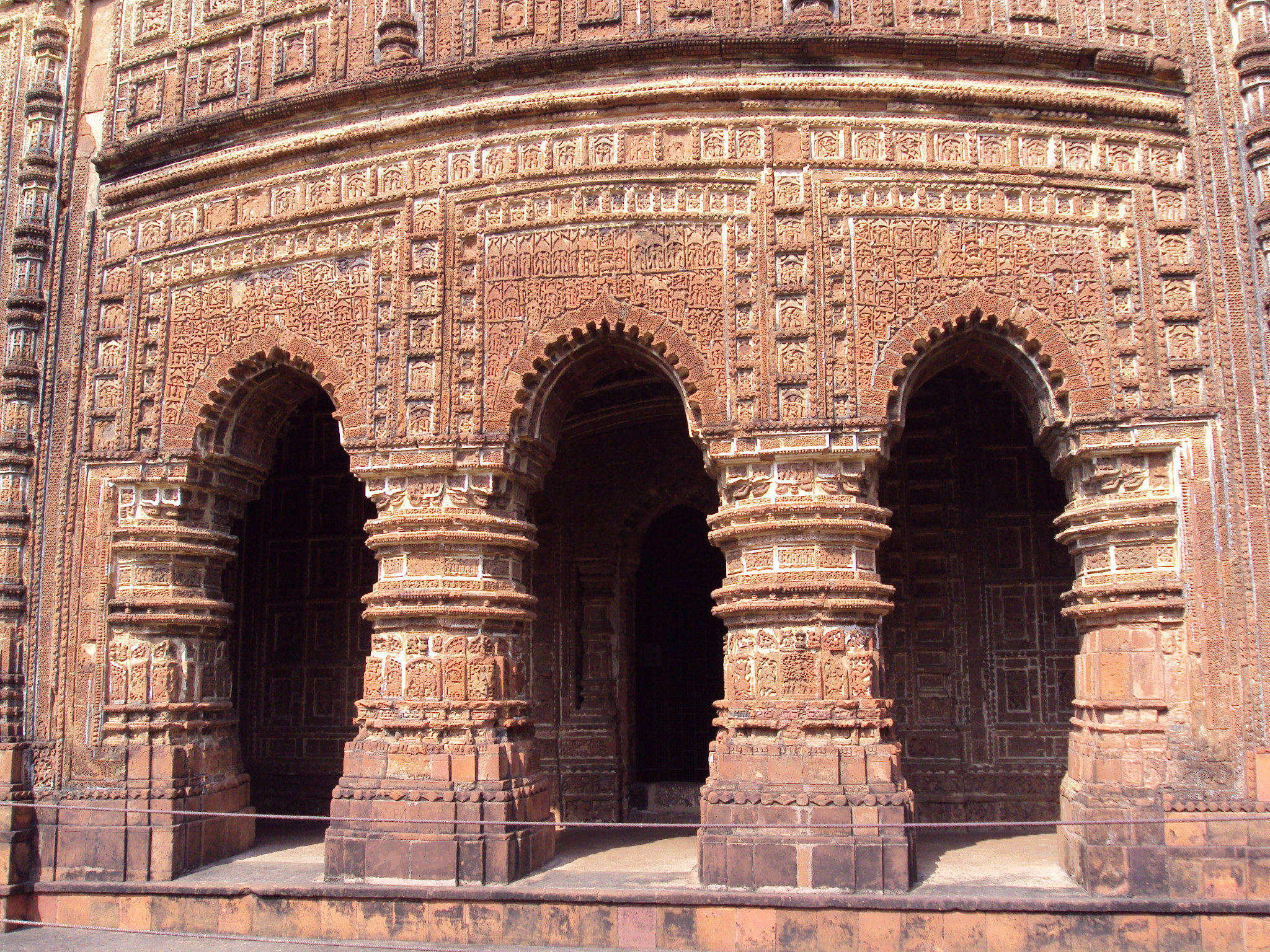

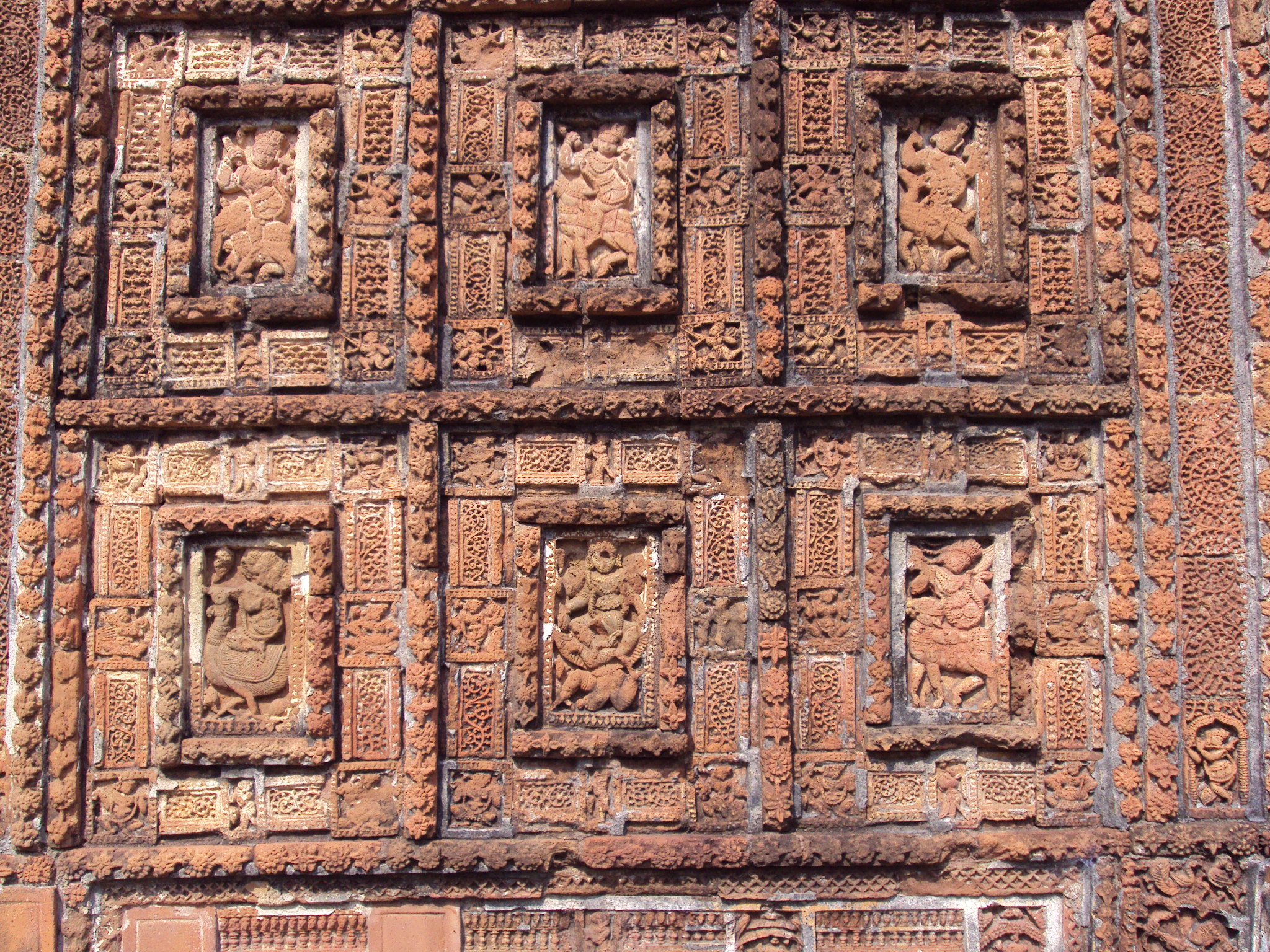

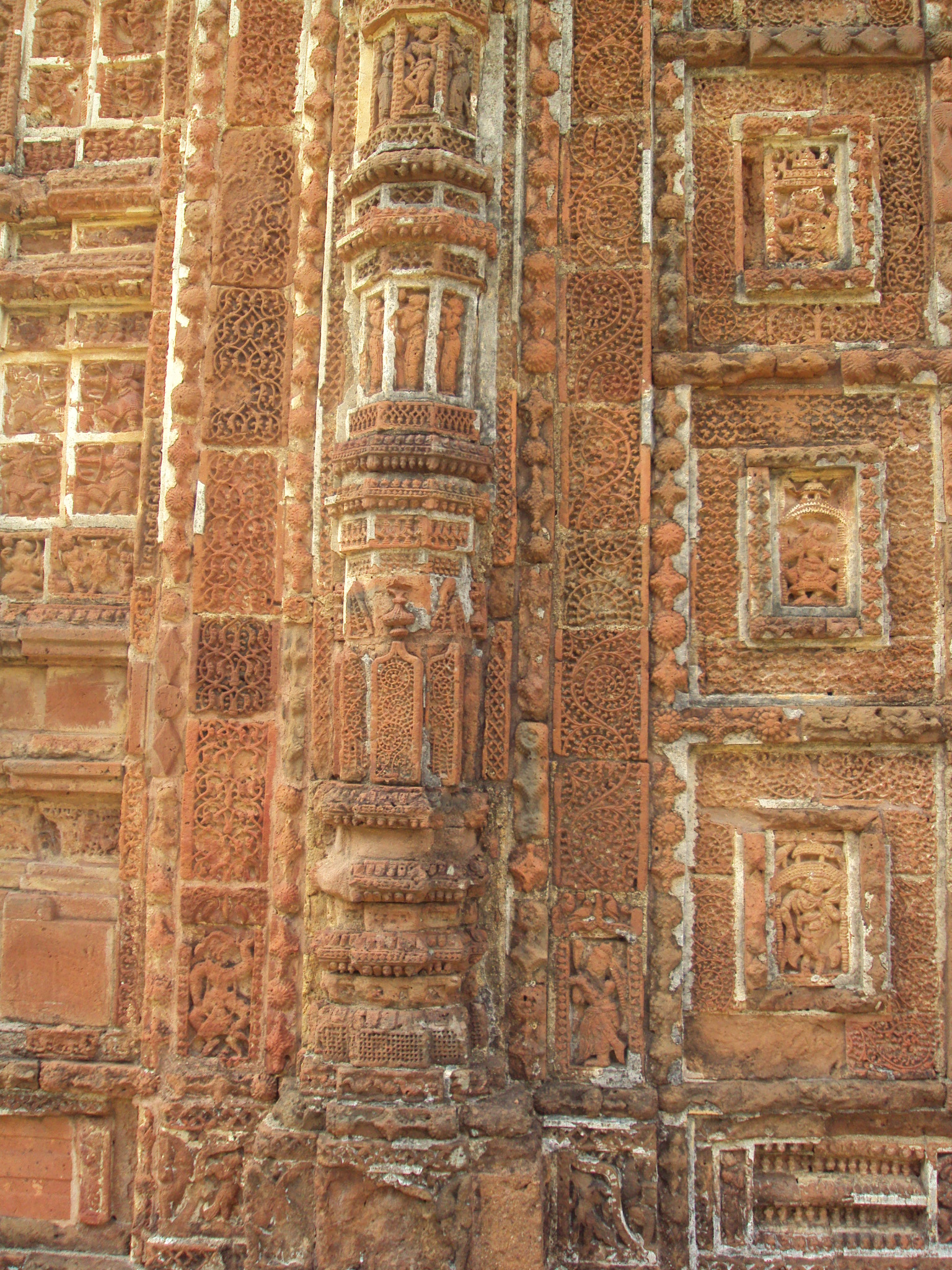

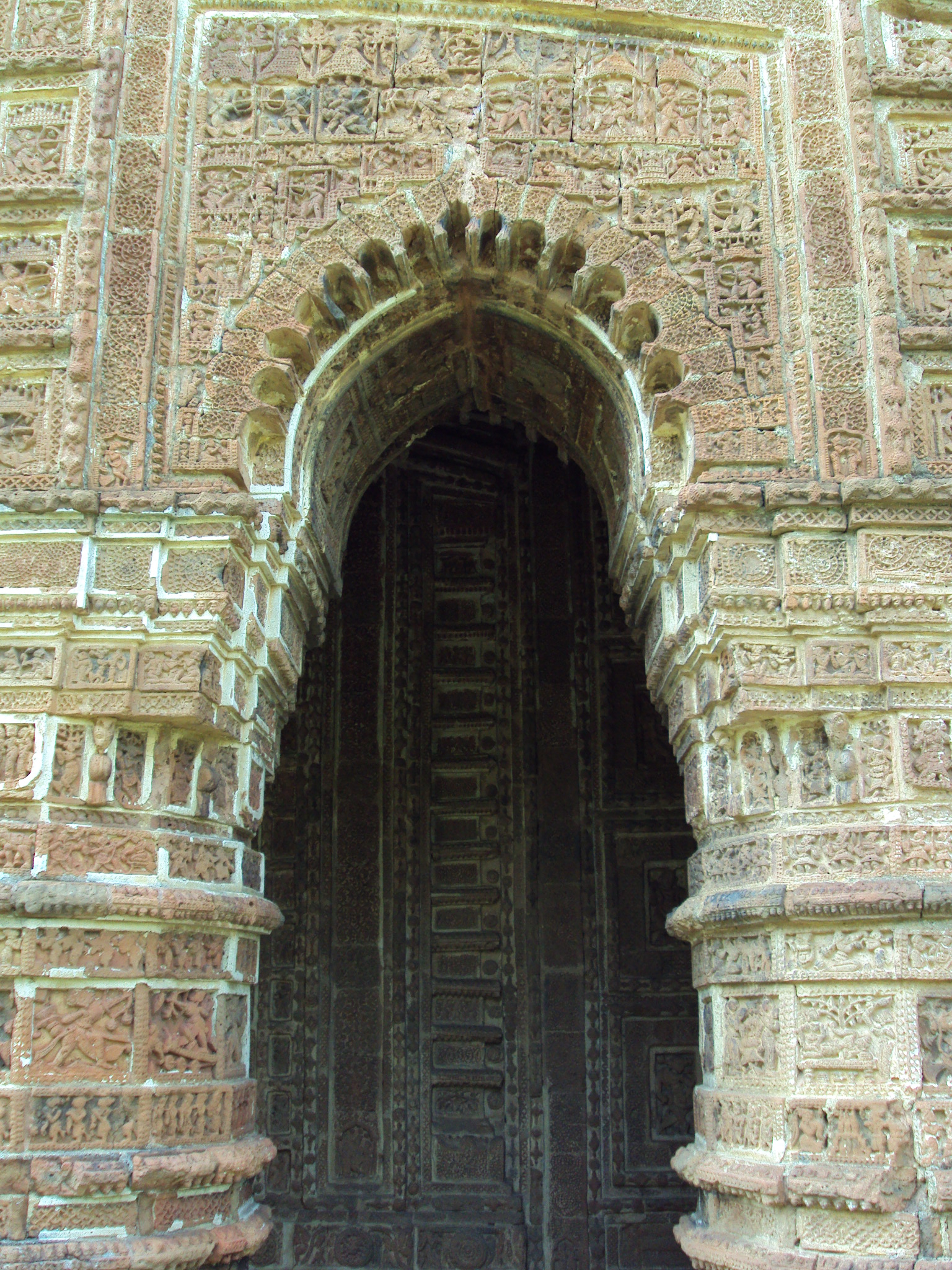

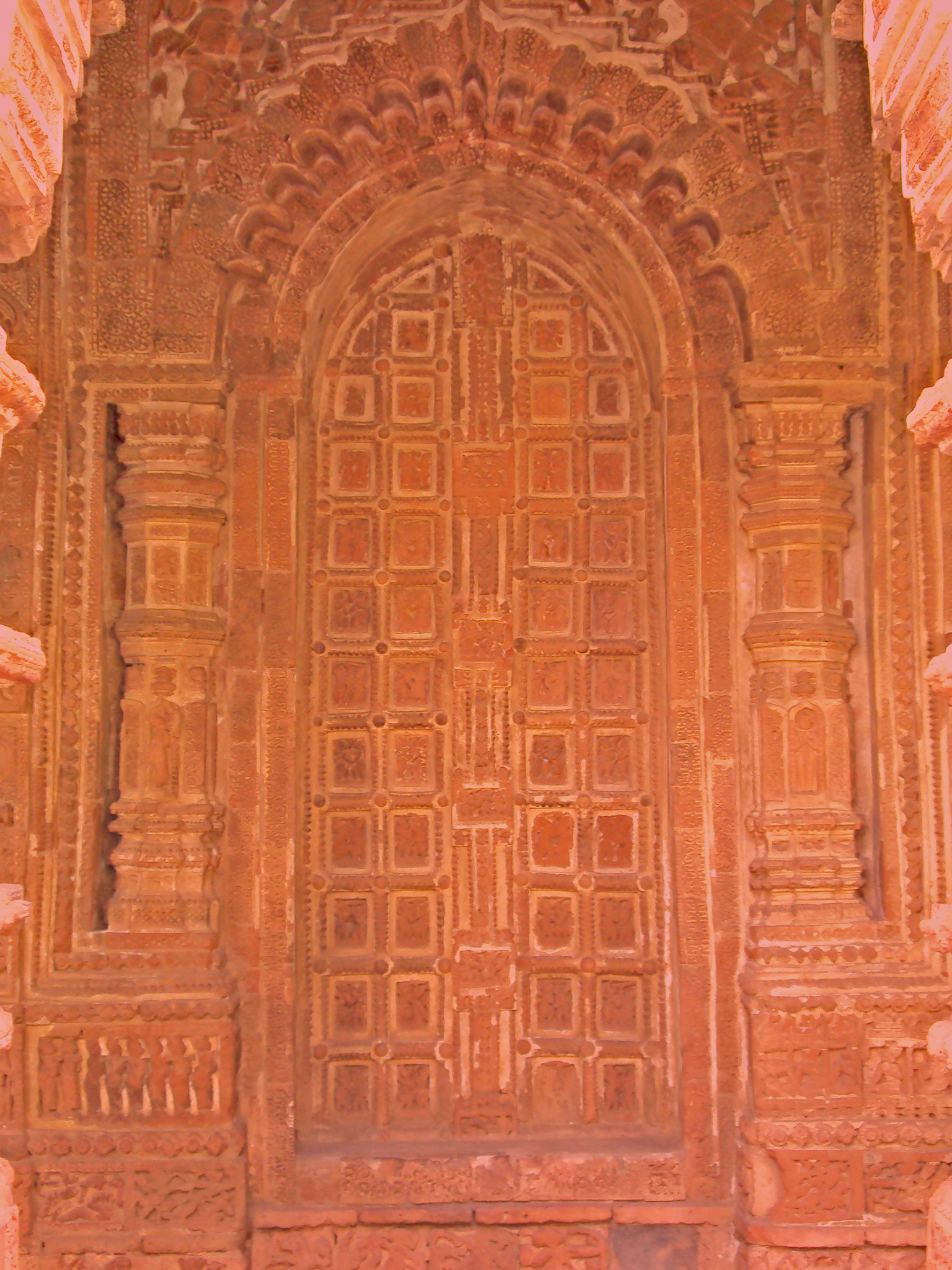

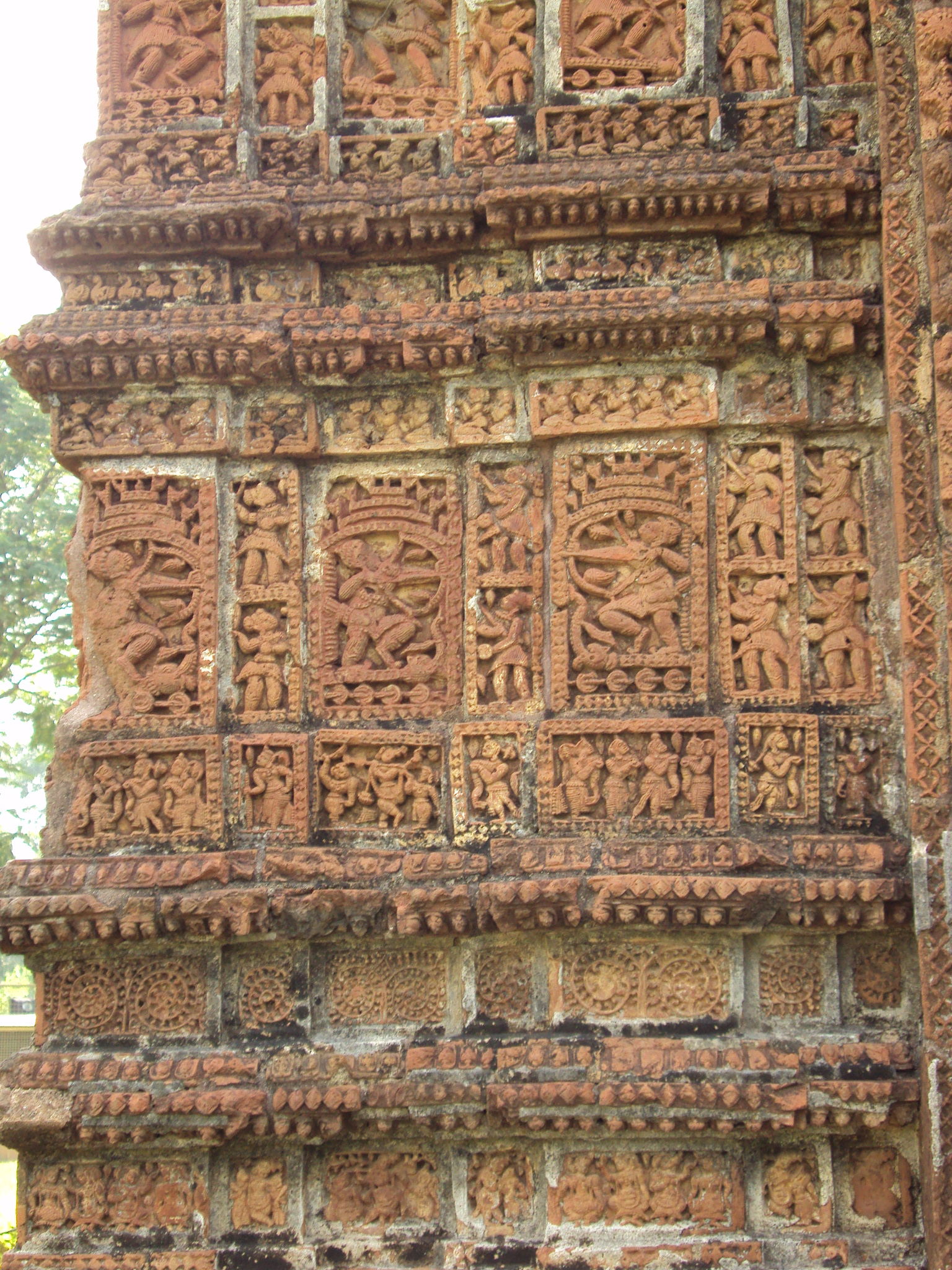

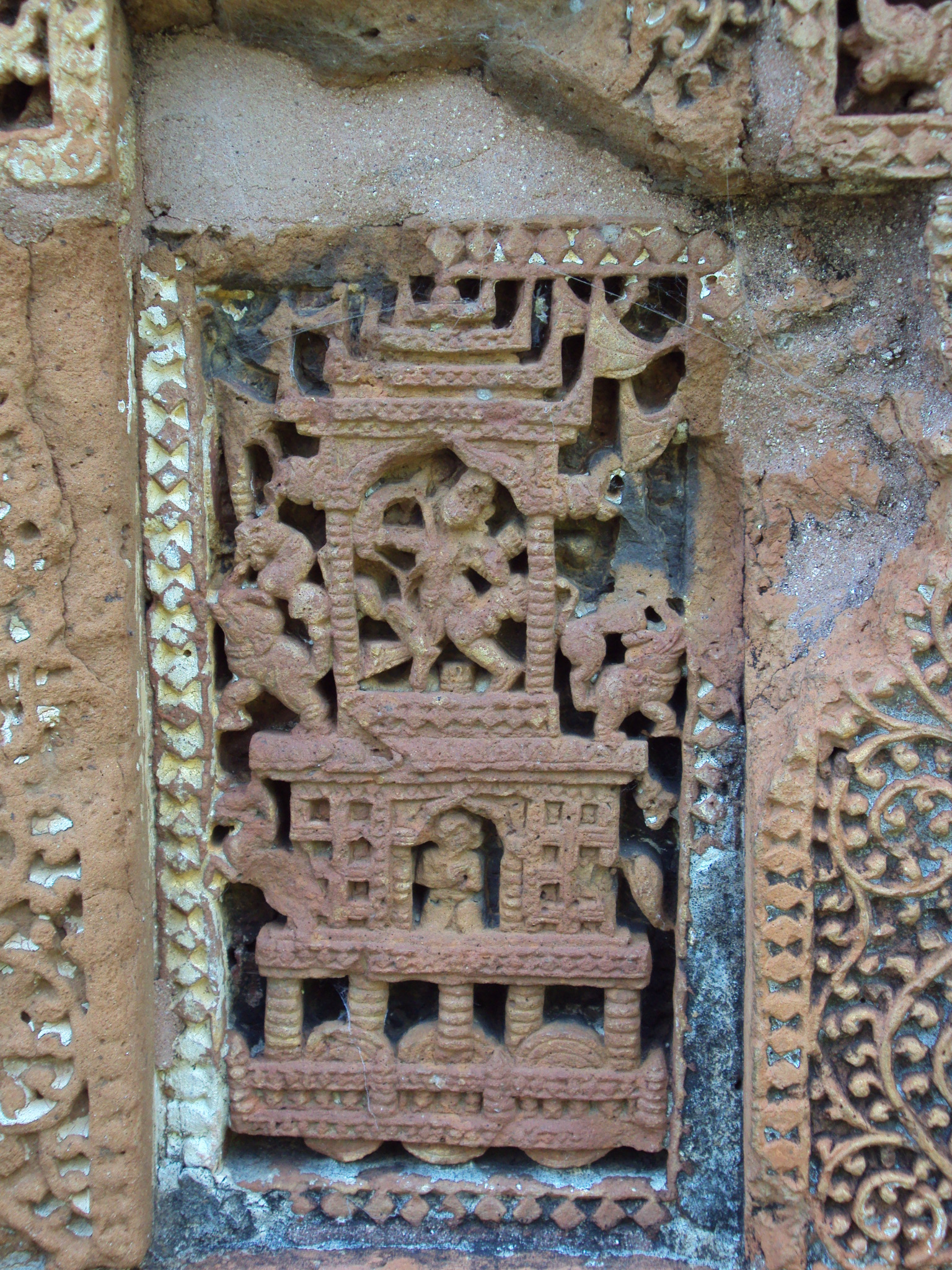

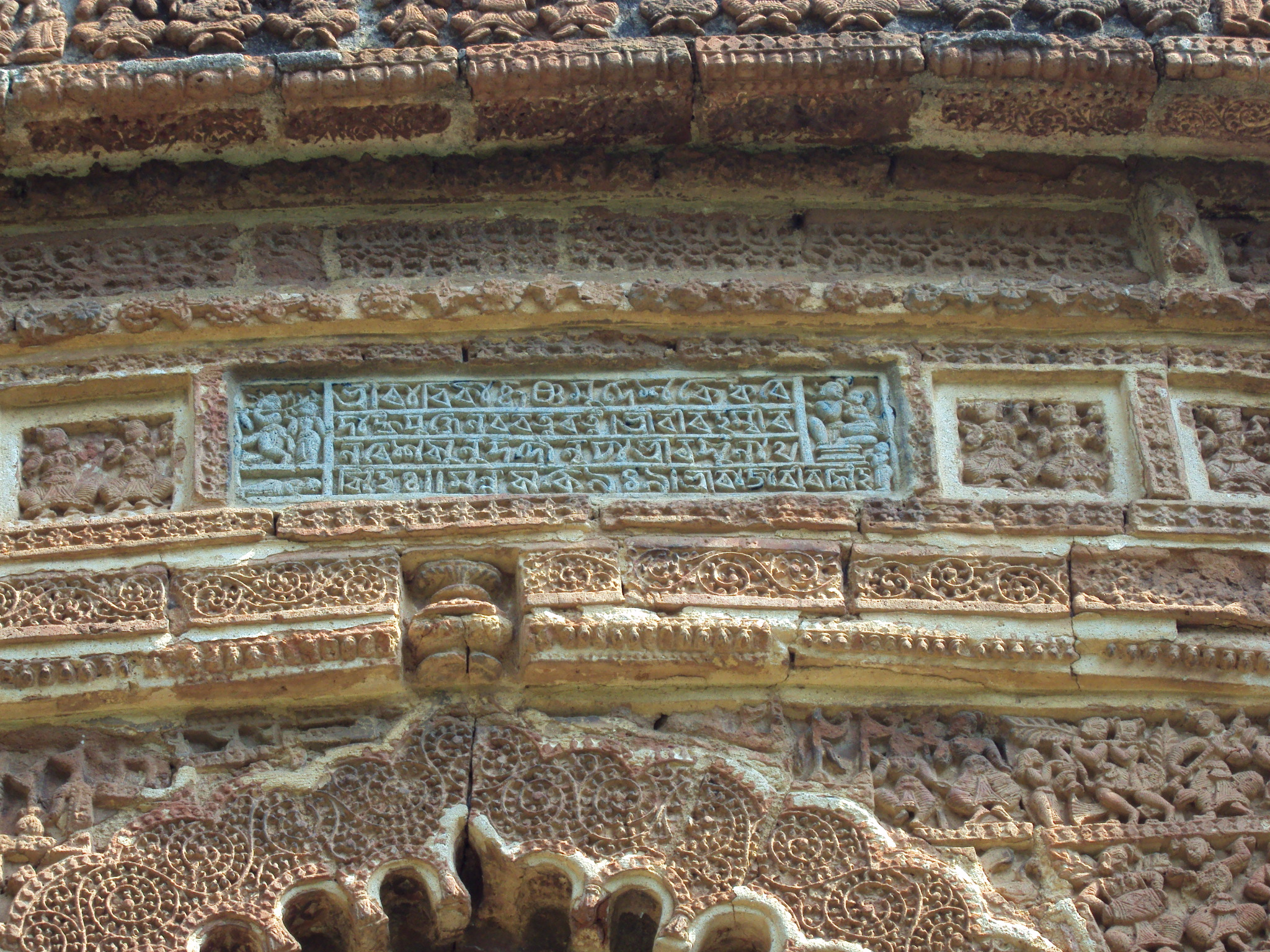

== In popular culture ==
The dhrupad gharana of Bishnupur kingdom

=== Film ===
- Eastern Zonal Cultural Centre, Kolkata, brings you the Fourth Documentary from 𝗢𝗻𝗹𝗶𝗻𝗲 𝗔𝗿𝗰𝗵𝗶𝘃𝗲 𝗗𝗼𝗰𝘂𝗺𝗲𝗻𝘁𝗮𝗿𝘆 𝗙𝗶𝗹𝗺 𝗙𝗲𝘀𝘁𝗶𝘃𝗮𝗹. The video is a presentation on the dhrupad gharana of Bishnupur kingdom.

== See also ==
- List of temples in Bishnupur

== Sources ==
- Dasgupta, Gautam Kumar; Biswas, Samira; Mallik, Rabiranjan (2009), Heritage Tourism: An Anthropological Journey to Bishnupur, A Mittal Publication, p. 20, ISBN 978-8183242943
